= 1782 =

1782 in various calendars
- Gregorian calendar: 1782; MDCCLXXXII
- Ab urbe condita: 2535
- Armenian calendar: 1231; ԹՎ ՌՄԼԱ
- Assyrian calendar: 6532
- Balinese saka calendar: 1703–1704
- Bengali calendar: 1188–1189
- Berber calendar: 2732
- British Regnal year: 22 Geo. 3 – 23 Geo. 3
- Buddhist calendar: 2326
- Burmese calendar: 1144
- Byzantine calendar: 7290–7291
- Chinese calendar: 辛丑年 (Metal Ox); 4479 or 4272 — to — 壬寅年 (Water Tiger); 4480 or 4273
- Coptic calendar: 1498–1499
- Discordian calendar: 2948
- Ethiopian calendar: 1774–1775
- Hebrew calendar: 5542–5543
- Hindu calendars
- Vikram Samvat: 1838–1839
- Shaka Samvat: 1703–1704
- Kali Yuga: 4882–4883
- Holocene calendar: 11782
- Igbo calendar: 782–783
- Iranian calendar: 1160–1161
- Islamic calendar: 1196–1197
- Japanese calendar: Tenmei 2 (天明２年)
- Javanese calendar: 1707–1708
- Julian calendar: Gregorian minus 11 days
- Korean calendar: 4115
- Minguo calendar: 130 before ROC 民前130年
- Nanakshahi calendar: 314
- Thai solar calendar: 2324–2325
- Tibetan calendar: ལྕགས་མོ་གླང་ལོ་ (female Iron-Ox); 1908 or 1527 or 755 — to — ཆུ་ཕོ་སྟག་ལོ་ (male Water-Tiger); 1909 or 1528 or 756

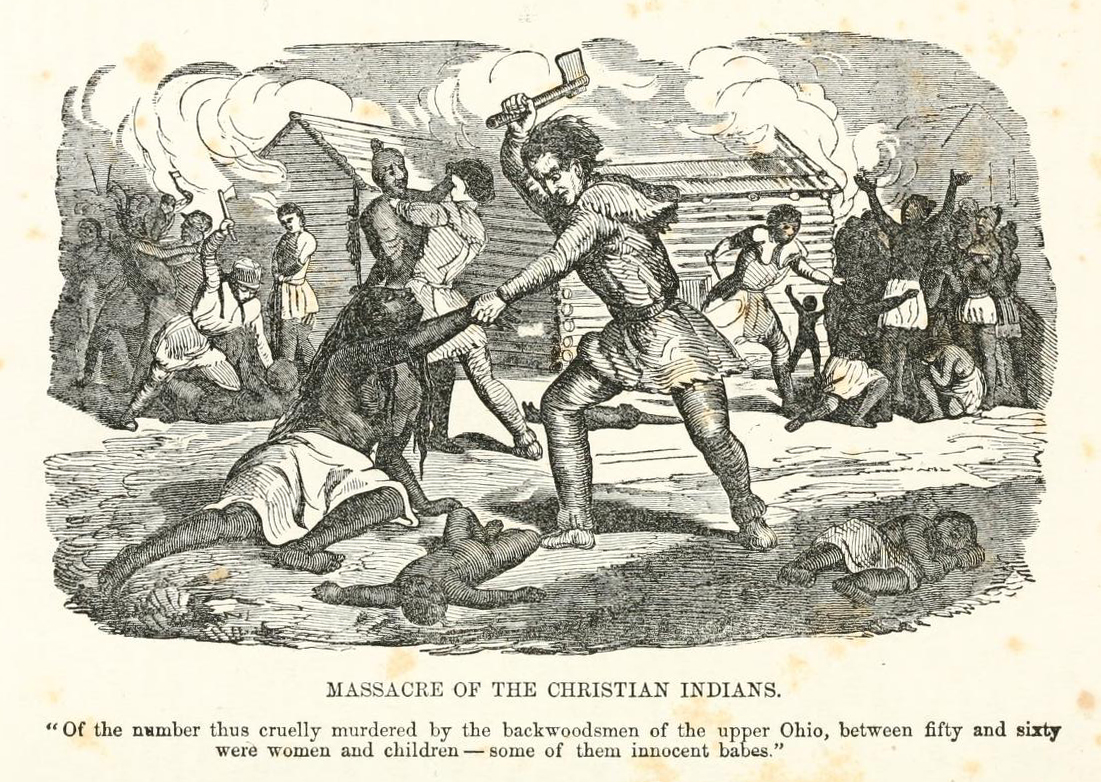
March 8: Gnadenhutten massacre of 96 pacifist Christian Indians carried out by Pennsylvania militia

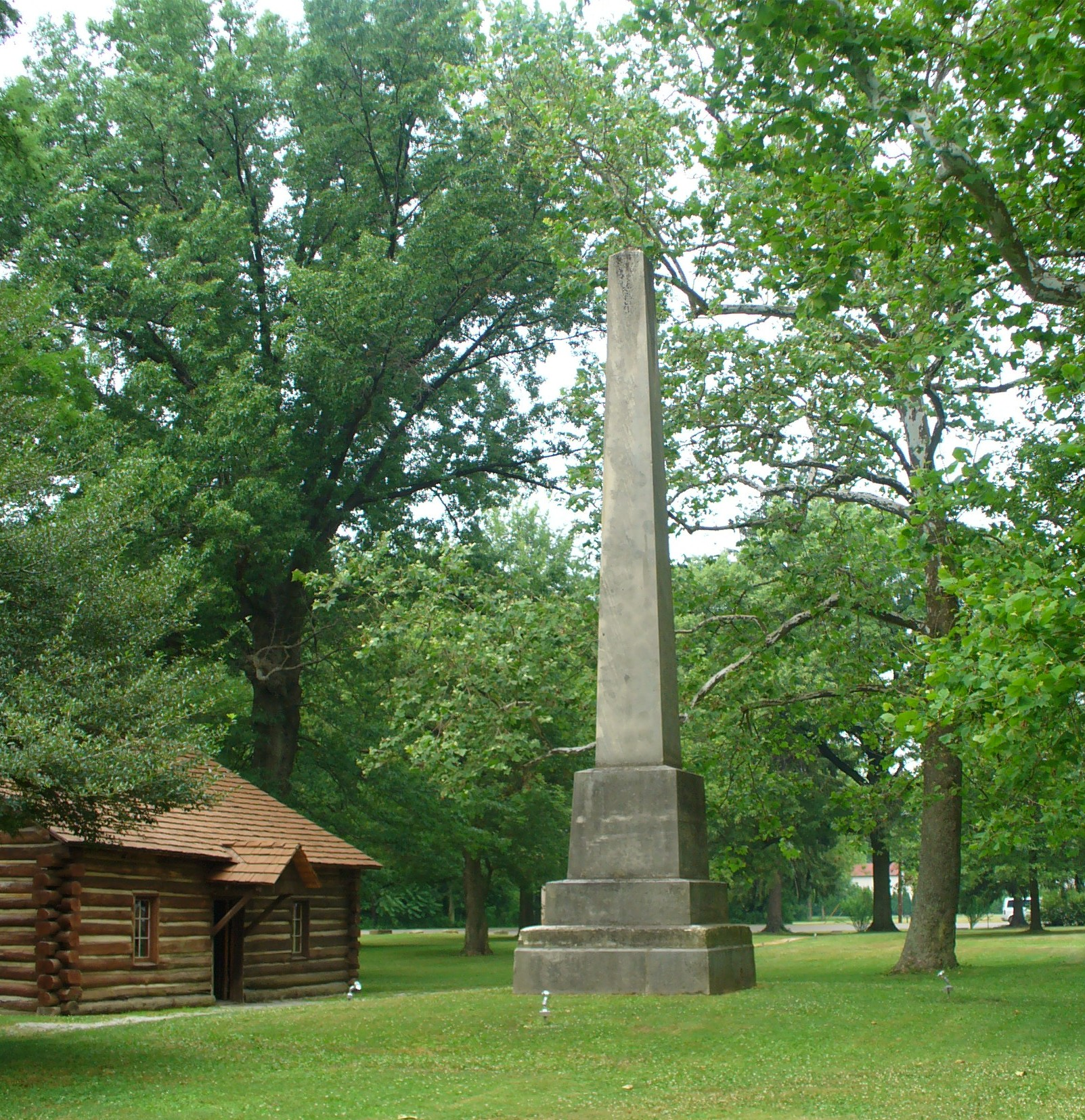
Monument to the memory of the victims of the Gnadenhutten massacre

1782 (MDCCLXXXII) was a common year starting on Tuesday of the Gregorian calendar and a common year starting on Saturday of the Julian calendar, the 1782nd year of the Common Era (CE) and Anno Domini (AD) designations, the 782nd year of the 2nd millennium, the 82nd year of the 18th century, and the 3rd year of the 1780s decade. As of the start of 1782, the Gregorian calendar was 11 days ahead of the Julian calendar, which remained in localized use until 1923.

== Events ==
=== January–March ===
- January 7 – The first American commercial bank (Bank of North America) opens.
- January 15 – Superintendent of Finance Robert Morris goes before the United States Congress to recommend establishment of a national mint and decimal coinage.
- January 23 – The Laird of Johnstone (George Ludovic Houston) invites people to buy marked plots of land which, when built upon, form the planned town of Johnstone, Scotland, to provide employment for his thread and cotton mills.
- February 5 – The Spanish defeat British forces and capture Menorca.
- February 6 – Singu Min is overthrown as king of Myanmar by his cousin Phaungka Min and would be executed eight days later by his uncle Bodawpayar.
- February 18 – Fourth Anglo-Dutch War: Shirley's Gold Coast expedition lands at Elmina on the Dutch Gold Coast. The British expedition fails to take the fort here but over the next several weeks seizes, with minimal resistance, four small Dutch forts.
- February 27 – The British House of Commons votes against further war in America, paving the way for the Second Rockingham ministry and the Peace of Paris.
- March 8 – Gnadenhutten massacre: In Ohio, 29 Native American men, 27 women, and 34 children are killed by colonial militiamen in retaliation for raids carried out by another Native American group.
- March 27 – Charles Watson-Wentworth, 2nd Marquess of Rockingham becomes Prime Minister of Great Britain.
- March 31 (Easter Sunday) – Mission San Buenaventura is founded in Las Californias, part of the Viceroyalty of New Spain.

=== April–June ===
- April 6 – Rama I overthrows King Taksin of Siam (now Thailand) in a coup d'état, and moves the political capital from Thonburi, across the Chao Phraya River to Rattanakosin Island, the historic center of Bangkok.

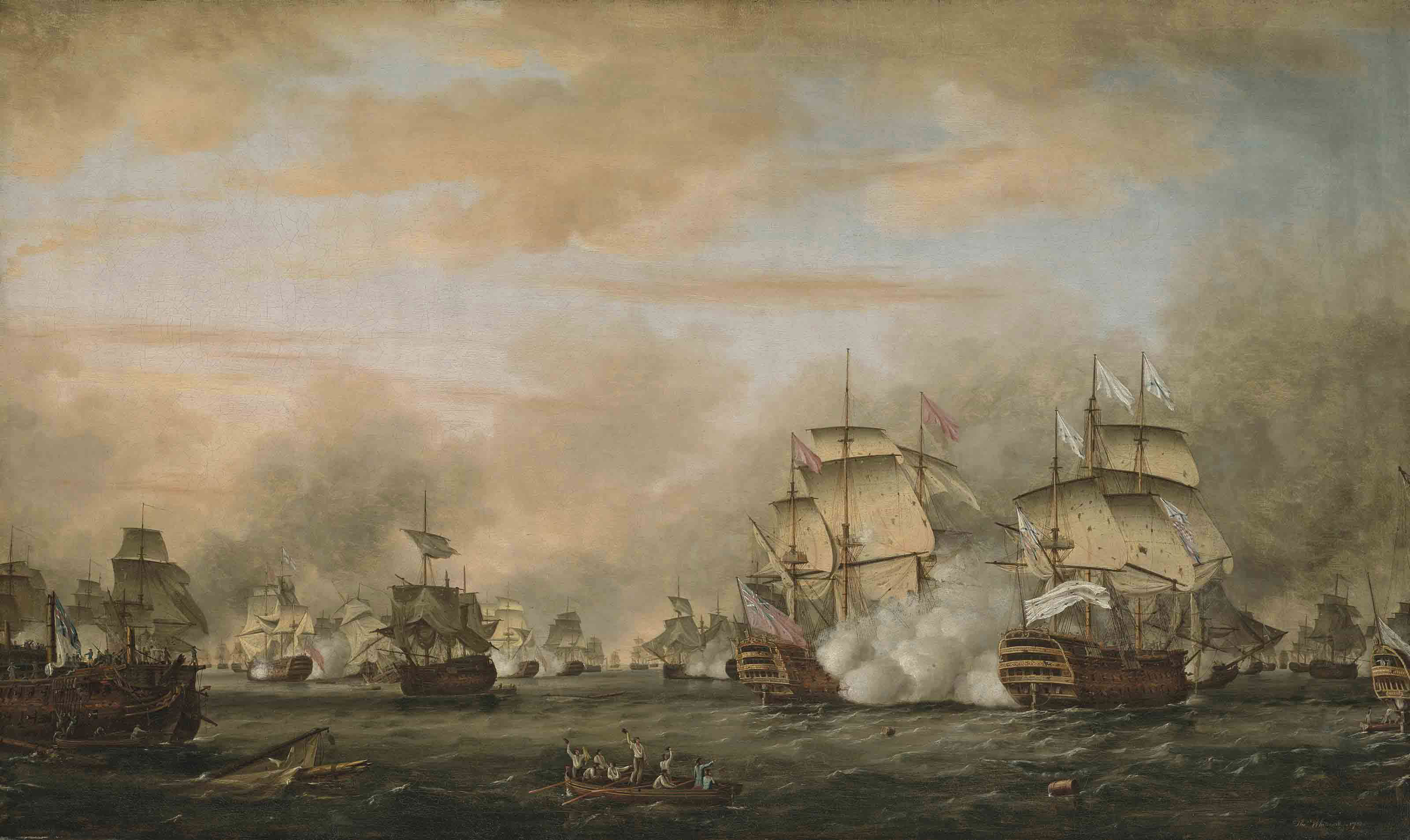
April 12: Battle of the Saintes.

- April 12 – Battle of the Saintes: A British fleet under Admiral Sir George Rodney defeats a French fleet under the Comte de Grasse, in the West Indies.
- April 19 – John Adams secures recognition of the United States as an independent government by the Dutch Republic. During this visit, he also negotiates a loan of five million guilders, financed by Nicolaas van Staphorst and Wilhelm Willink.
- April 21 – A Lak Mueang (city pillar) is erected on Rattanakosin Island, located on the eastern bank of the Chao Phraya River, by order of King Rama I, an act considered the founding of the capital city of Bangkok.
- May 17 – The Parliament of Great Britain passes the Repeal of Act for Securing Dependence of Ireland Act, a major component of the reforms collectively known as the Constitution of 1782, which restore legislative independence to the Parliament of Ireland.
- June 18 – In Switzerland, Anna Göldi is sentenced to death for witchcraft (the last legal witchcraft sentence).
- June 20 – The bald eagle is chosen as the emblem of the United States of America. On the same day, the Confederation Congress adopts the design for the Great Seal of the United States.

=== July–September ===
- July – Joseph II, Holy Roman Emperor, receives a visit from Pope Pius VI.
- July 1 – Raid on Lunenburg: American privateers attack the British settlement at Lunenburg, Nova Scotia.
- July 16–August 29 – The Masonic Congress of Wilhelmsbad, Germany, one of the most important secret society congresses in history, takes place. High-degree Freemasons from the whole of Europe spend the time deliberating the fate of the rite of Strict Observance, and hierarchy of the governing bodies of world Freemasonry, at the Hanau-Wilhelmsbad spa.
- July 16 – Wolfgang Amadeus Mozart's opera Die Entführung aus dem Serail premieres at the Burgtheater in Vienna.
- August 7
  - George Washington orders the creation of the Badge of Military Merit (or the Order of the Purple Heart) to honor soldiers' merit in battle (reinstated later by Franklin D. Roosevelt, and renamed to the more poetic "Purple Heart", to honor soldiers wounded in action).
  - Étienne Maurice Falconet's Bronze Horseman statue of Tsar Peter the Great is unveiled in Saint Petersburg.
- August 19 – A combined British and Native American force defeat Kentucky militiamen in the Battle of Blue Licks in the last major battle of the American Revolutionary War.

=== October–December ===
- October 10 – Welsh actress Sarah Siddons, the pre-eminent star of the English stage, makes a triumphant return to the theatre in the title role of David Garrick's new play, Isabella, or The Fatal Marriage.
- October 18
  - The first franking privilege is granted for official correspondence to be sent at no charge to and from members of the Confederation Congress, at government expense, during periods when the Congress is in session.
  - John Adams returns to Paris as the first United States Minister to France.
- November 4 – Elias Boudinot of New Jersey is elected the new President of the Congress of the Confederation.
- November 30 – American Revolutionary War: In Paris, representatives from the United States and the Kingdom of Great Britain sign preliminary peace articles (later formalized in the Treaty of Paris).
- December 12 – American Revolutionary War: Action of 12 December 1782: A naval engagement off Ferrol, Spain, in which the British ship HMS Mediator commanded by James Luttrell successfully attacks a convoy of French and American ships attempting to supply the United States.
- December 14 – The Montgolfier brothers first test fly a hot air balloon in France; it floats nearly 2 km (1.2 mi).
- December 16 – East India Company: Hada and Mada Miah lead a rebellion in the Indian subcontinent against East India Company officer Robert Lindsay and his troops in Sylhet Shahi Eidgah.

=== Date unknown ===
- Chief Kamehameha I of Hawaii gains control of the northern part of the island of Hawaii, after defeating his cousin Kīwalaʻō.
- Princess Yekaterina Vorontsova-Dashkova is the first woman in the world to direct a scientific academy, the Imperial Academy of Arts and Sciences.
- London creates the Foot Patrol for public security.
- The British Parliament extends James Watt's patent for the steam engine to the year 1800.
- The North Carolina General Assembly incorporates Washington, North Carolina.
- In China, the Complete Library of the Four Treasuries is completed, the largest literary compilation in China's history (surpassing the Yongle Encyclopedia of the 15th century). The books are bound in 36,381 volumes (册) with more than 79,000 chapters (卷), comprising about 2.3 million pages, and approximately 800 million Chinese characters.
- The first theater in the Baltic, the Riga City Theater, is founded.
- Saint Petersburg, Russia has 300,000 inhabitants.

== Births ==
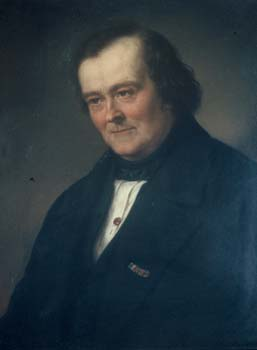
Philipp Franz von Walther born 3 January

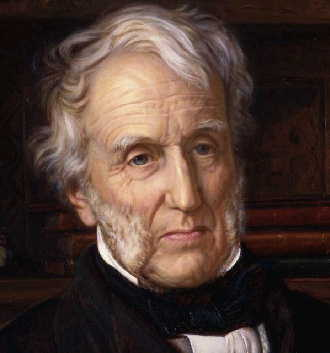
Stephen Lushington born 14 January

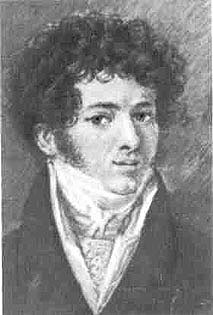
Afanasy Grigoriev born 21 January

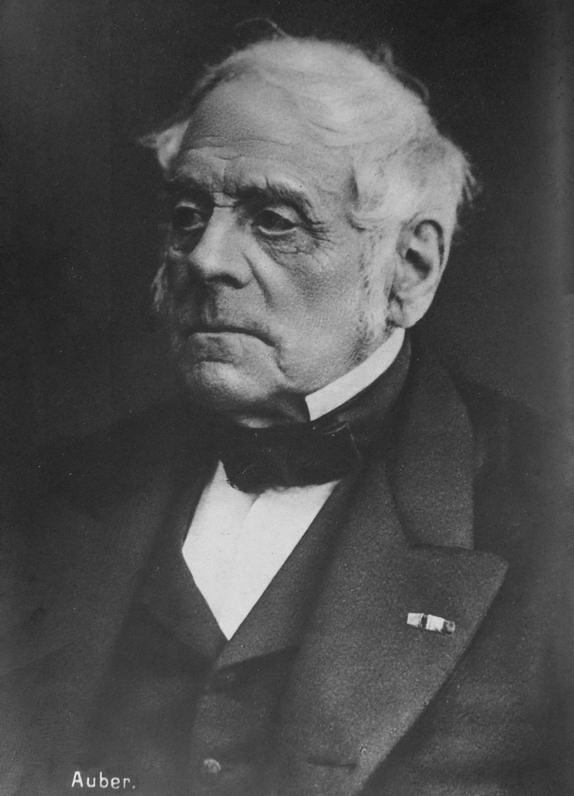
Daniel Auber born 29 January

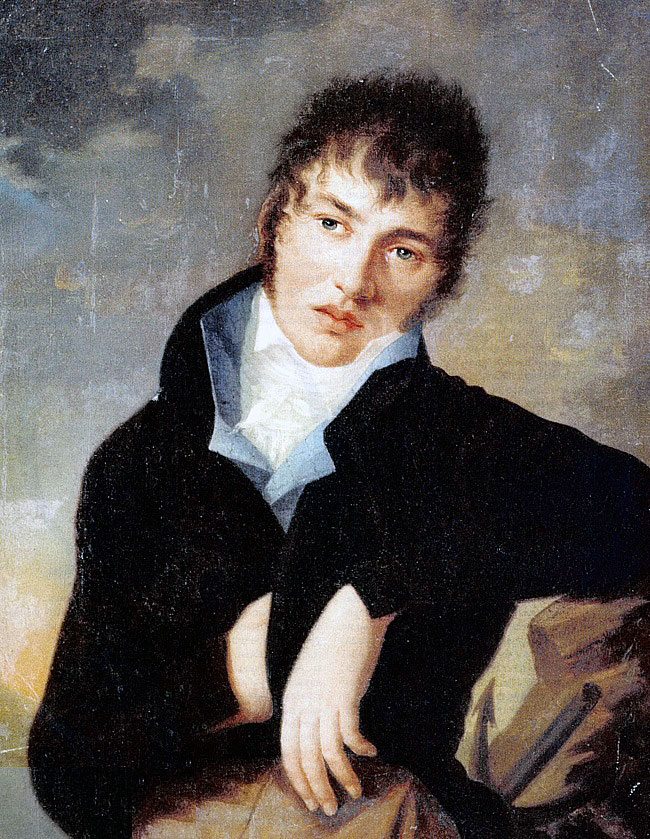
Fyodor Tolstoy born 6 February

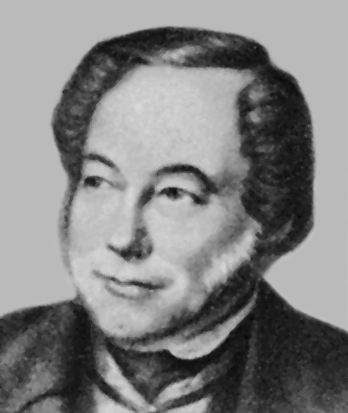
Friedrich Ernst Ludwig von Fischer born 8 February

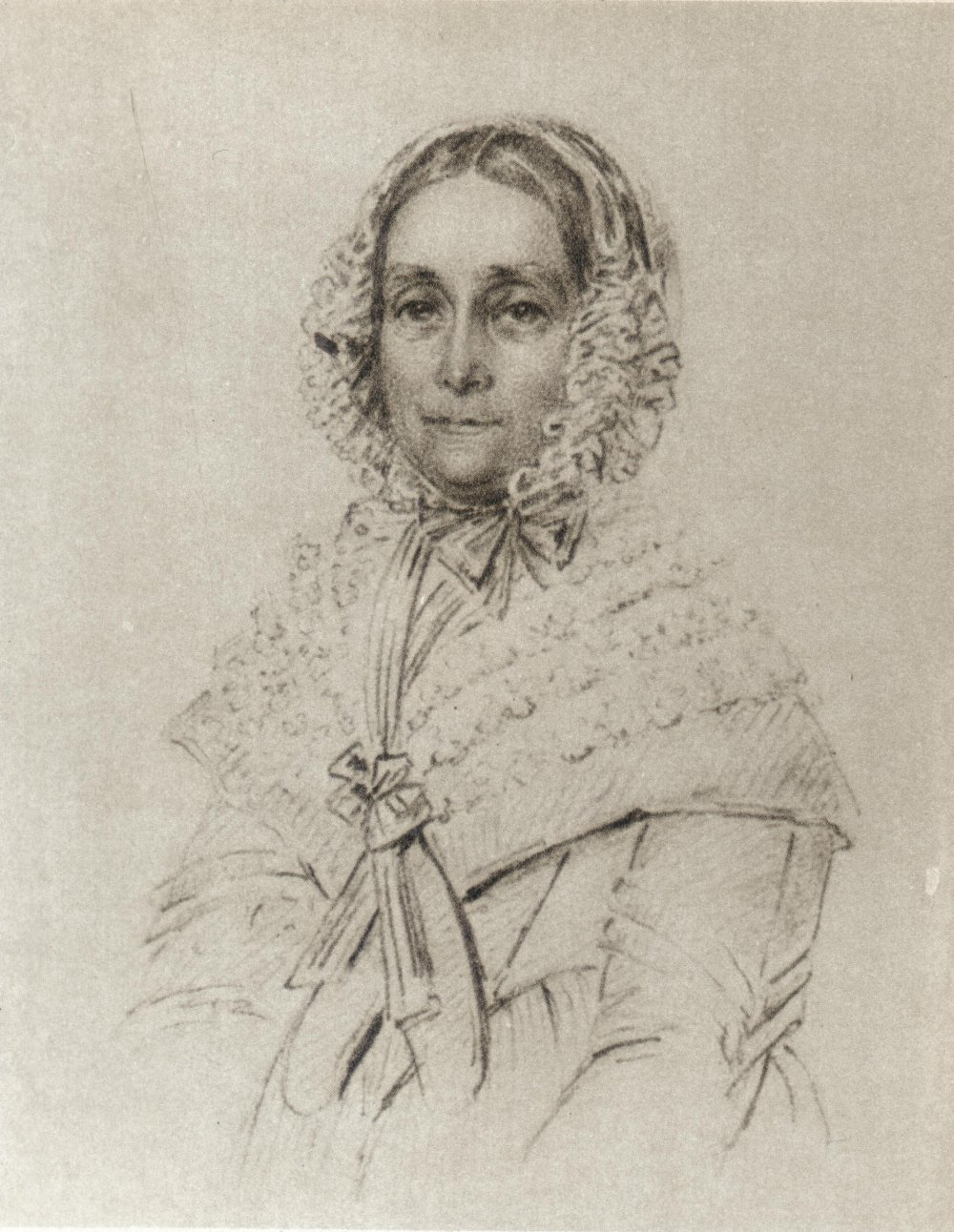
Malla Silfverstolpe born 8 February

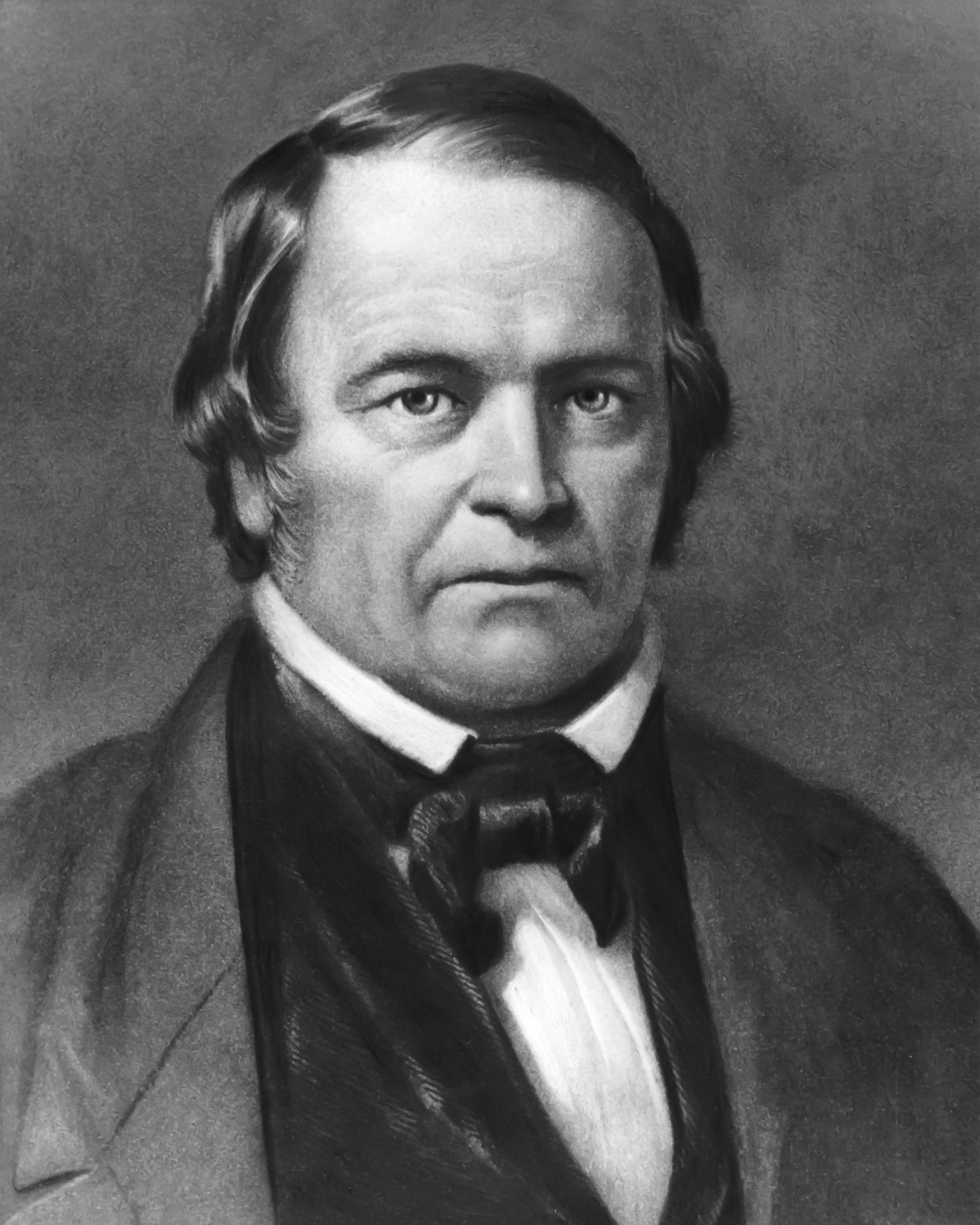
William Miller born 15 February

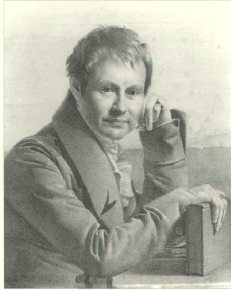
Johann Baptist Emanuel Pohl born 23 February

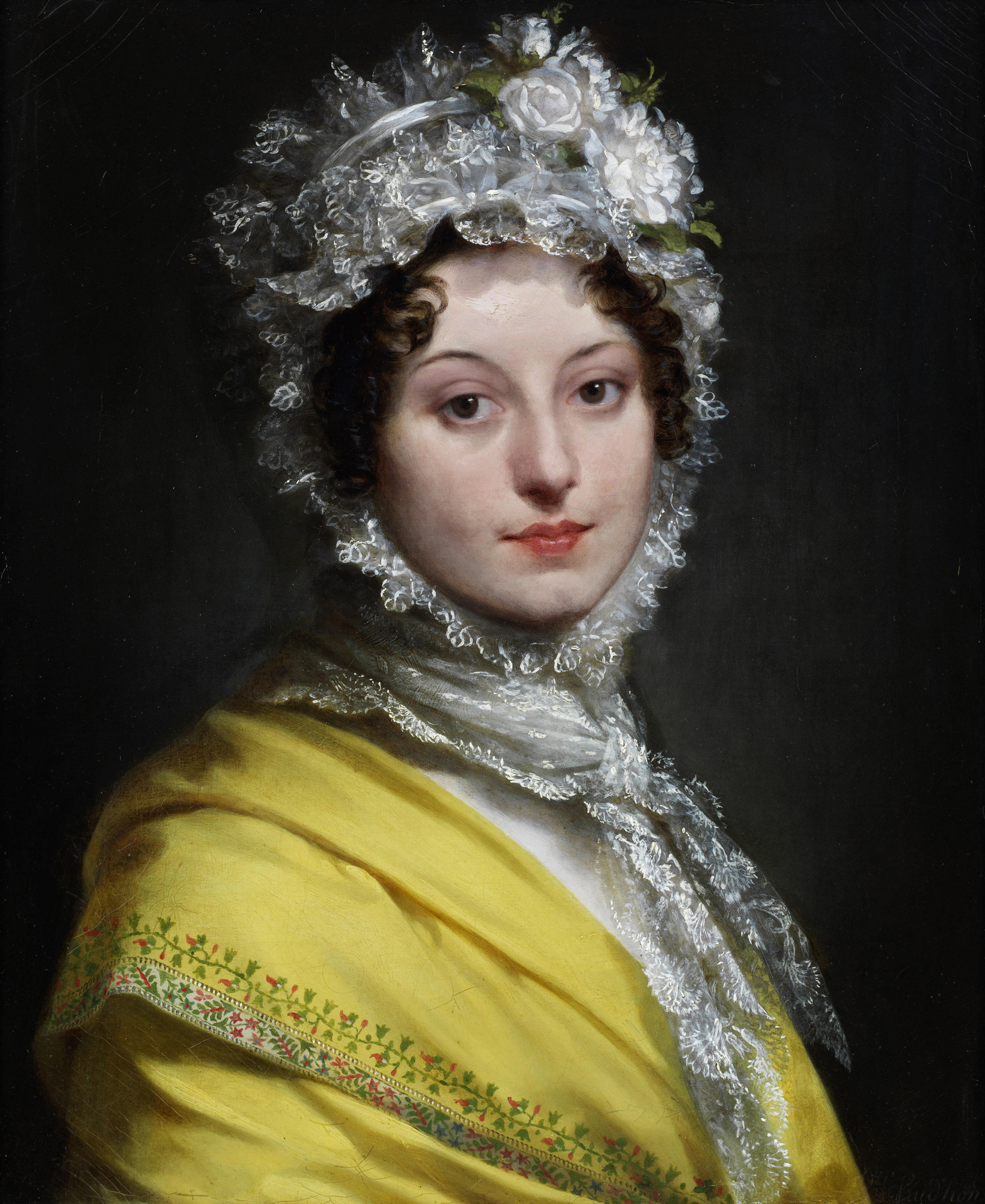
Louise Antoinette Lannes born 26 February

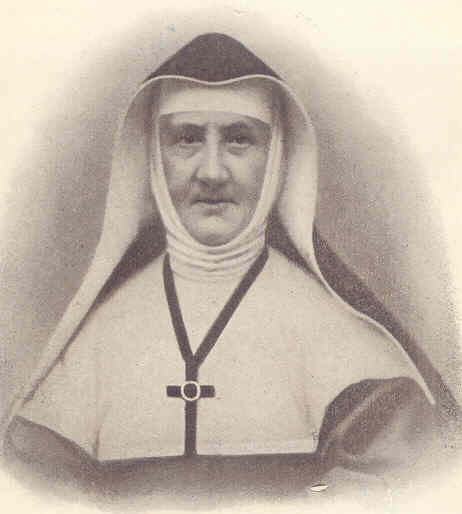
Marie Thérèse Haze born 27 February

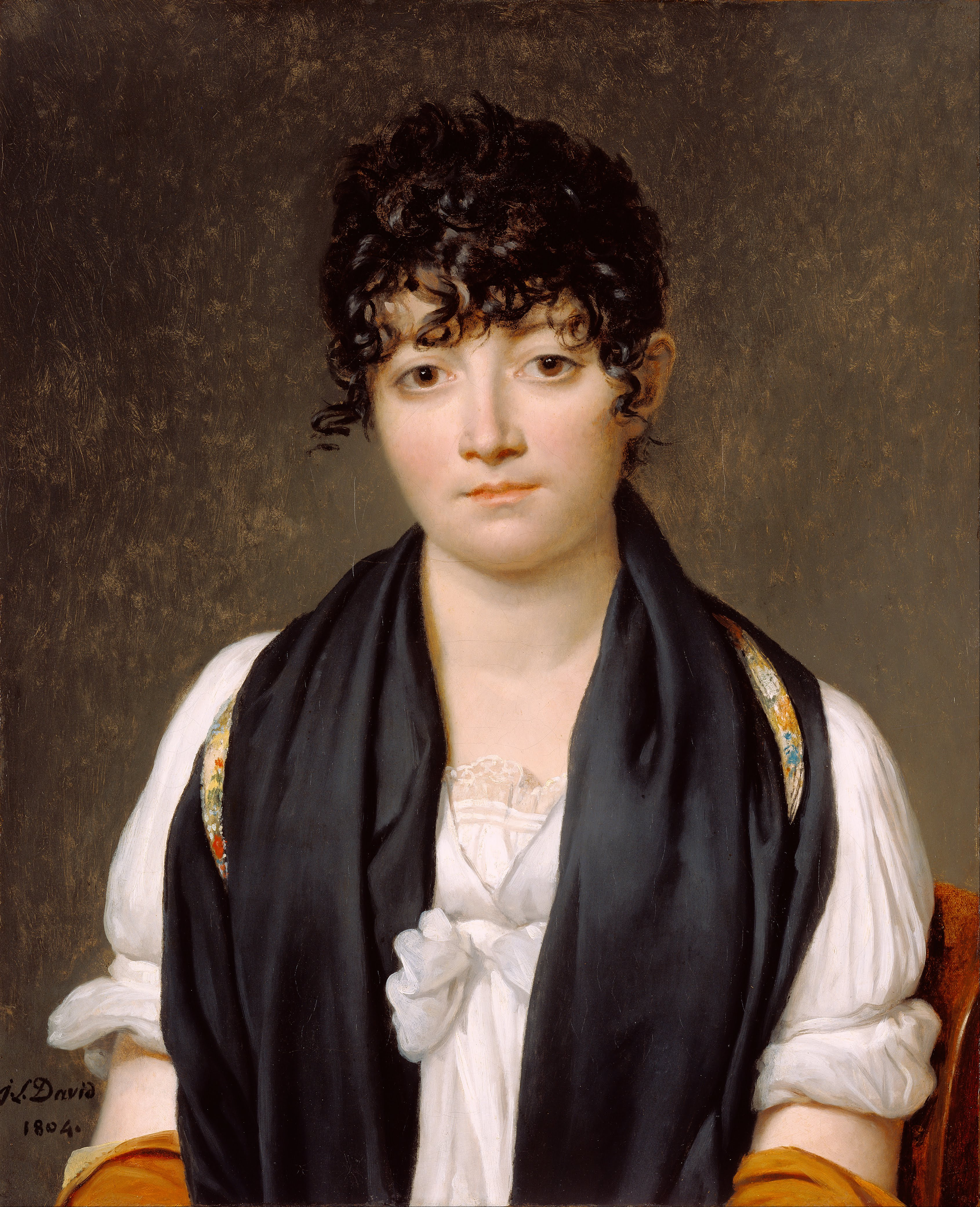
Suzanne le Peletier de Saint-Fargeau born 1 March

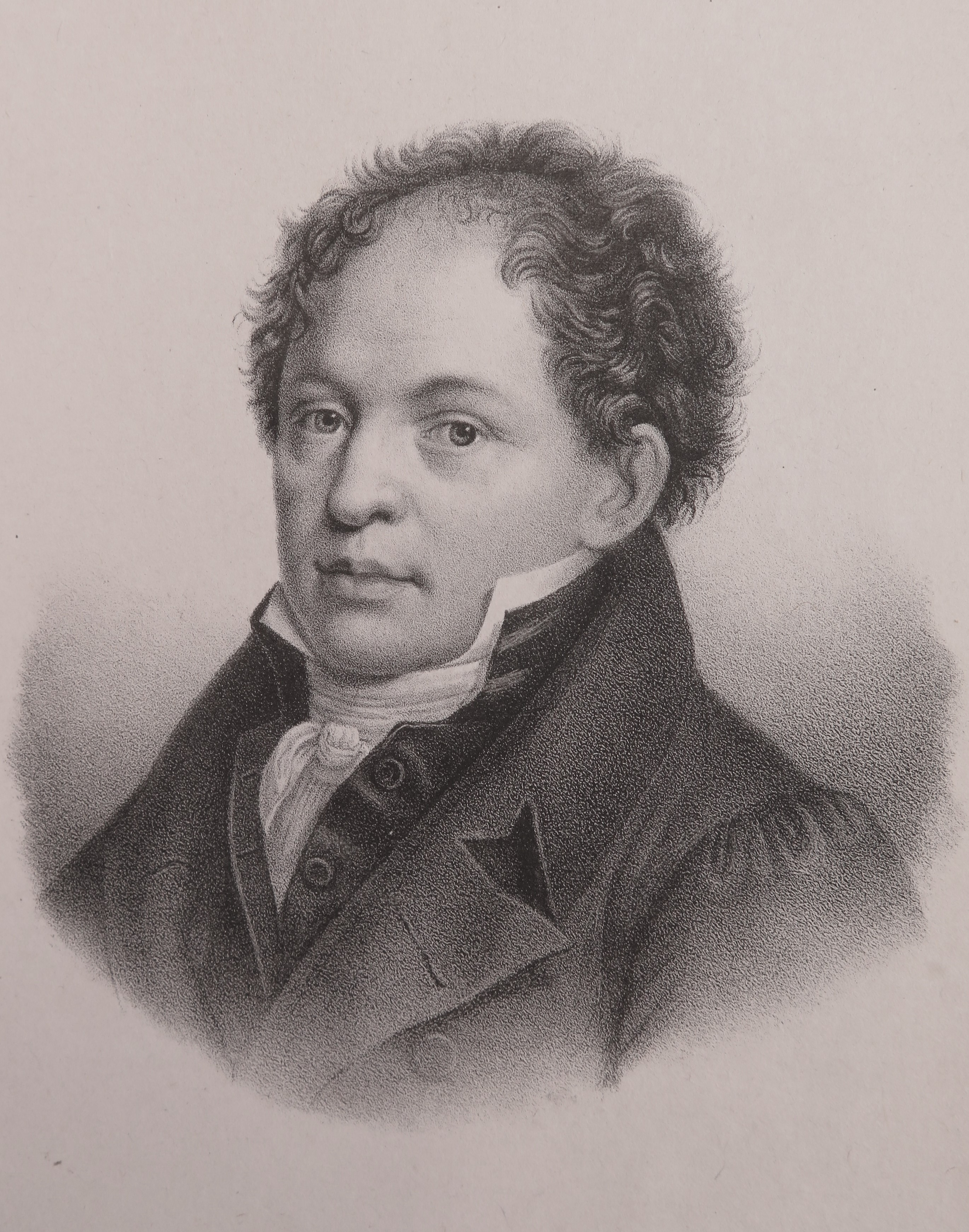
Johann Rudolf Wyss born 4 March

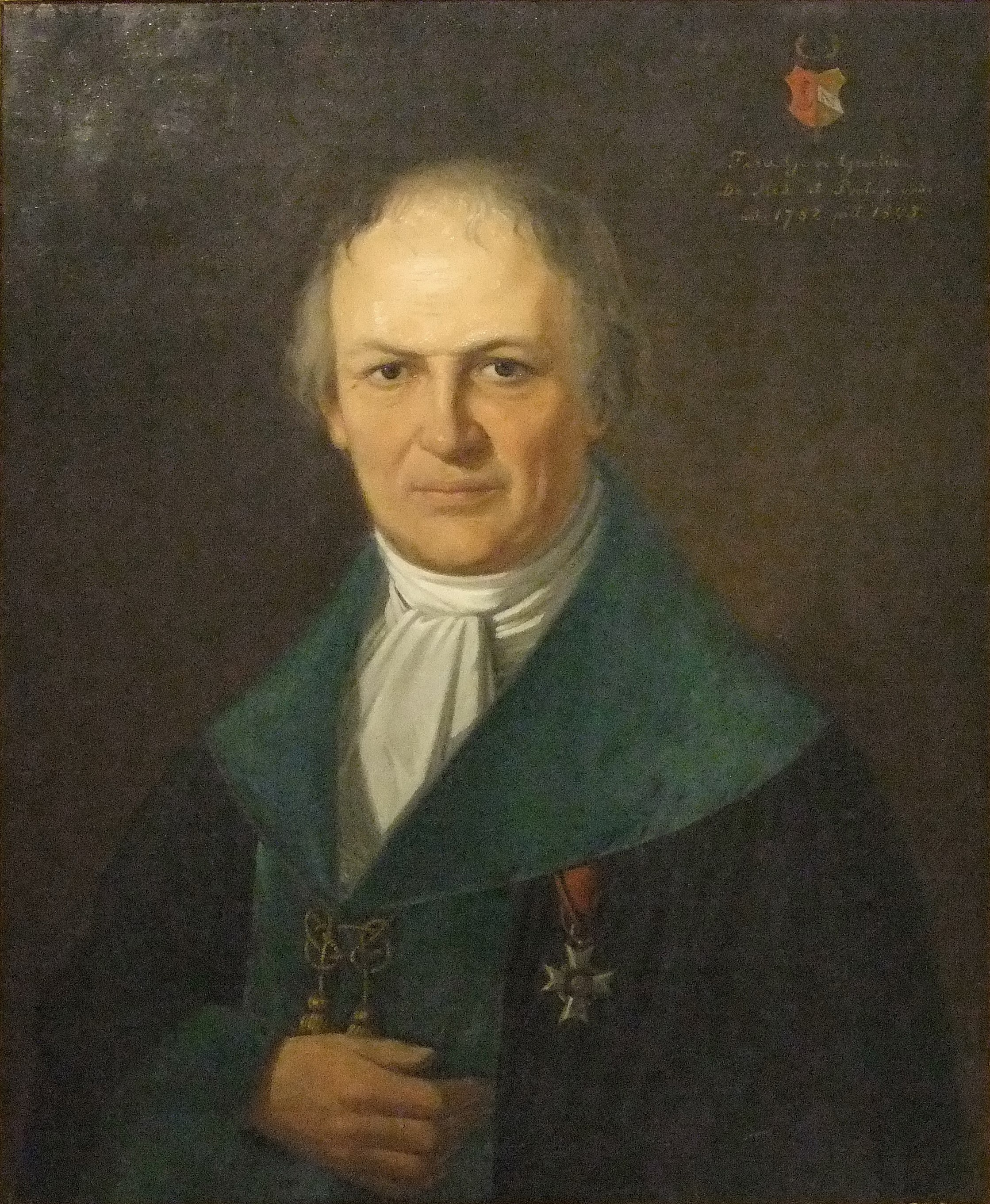
Ferdinand Gottlieb von Gmelin born 10 March

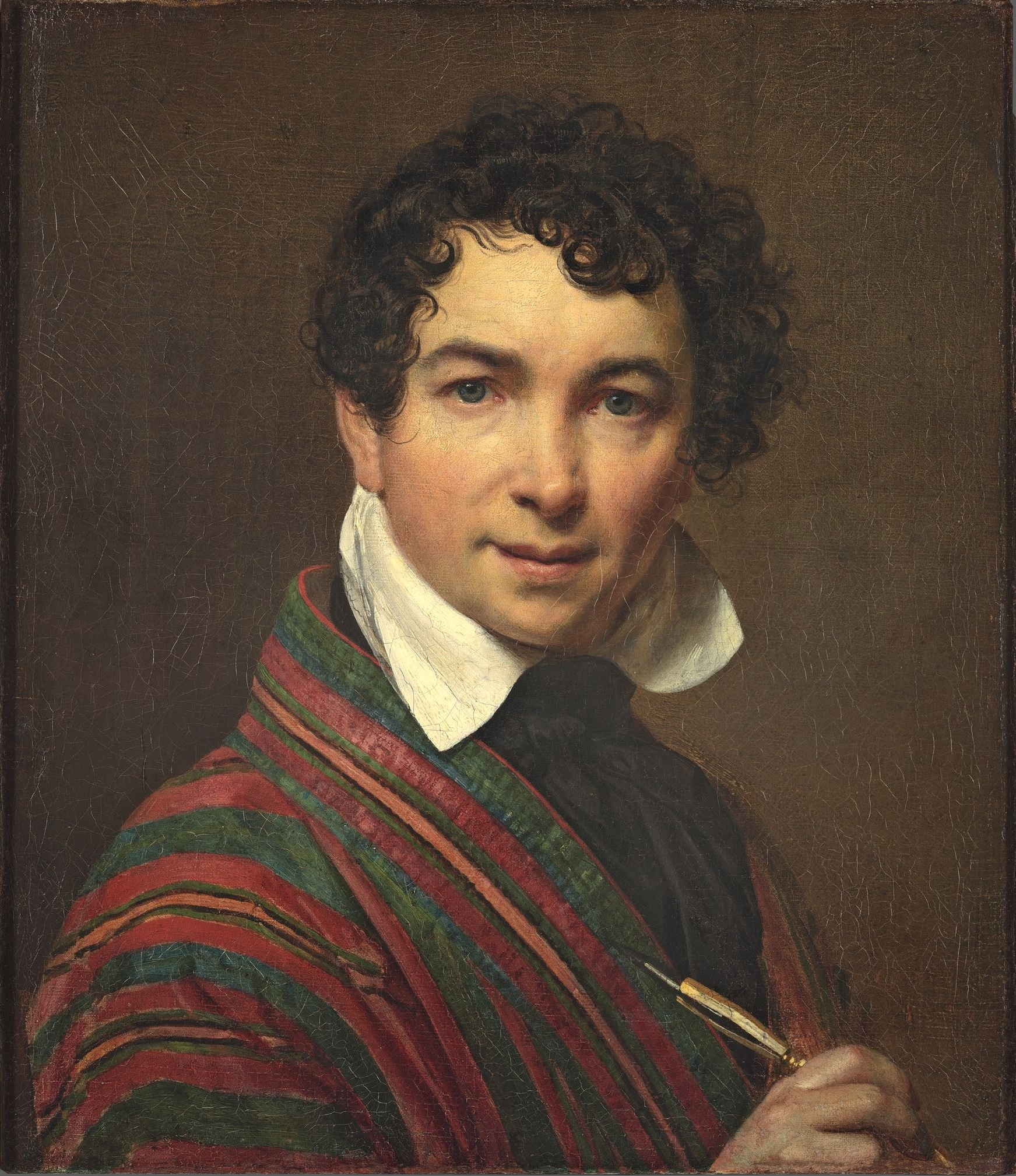
Orest Kiprensky born 13 March

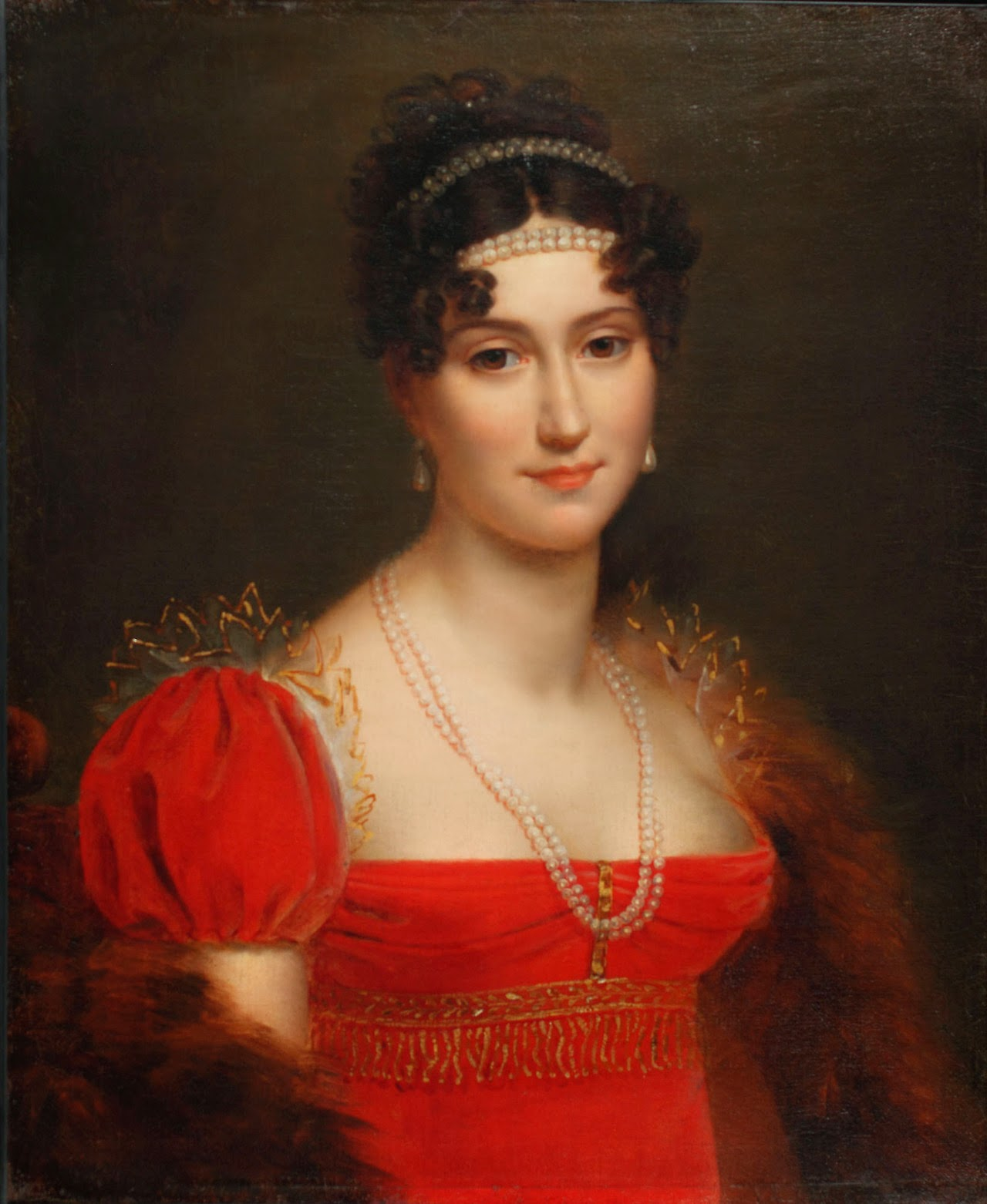
Aglaé Auguié born 24 March

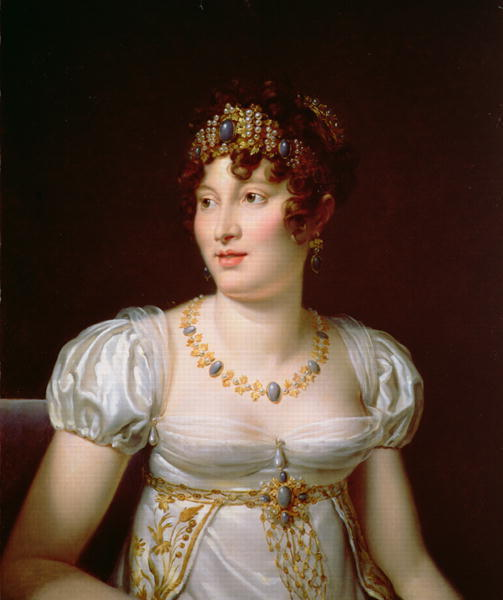
Caroline Bonaparte born 25 March

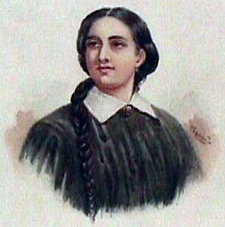
María Antonia Santos Plata born 10 April

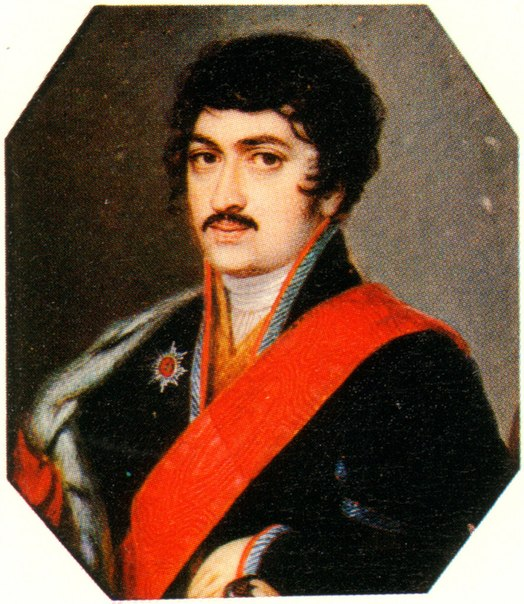
Prince Teimuraz of Georgia born 23 April

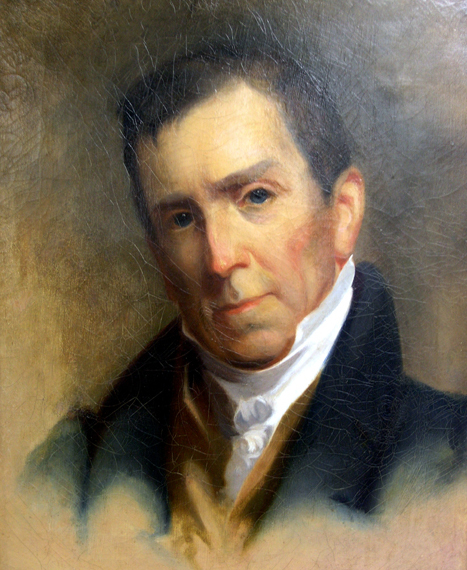
William Darlington born 28 April

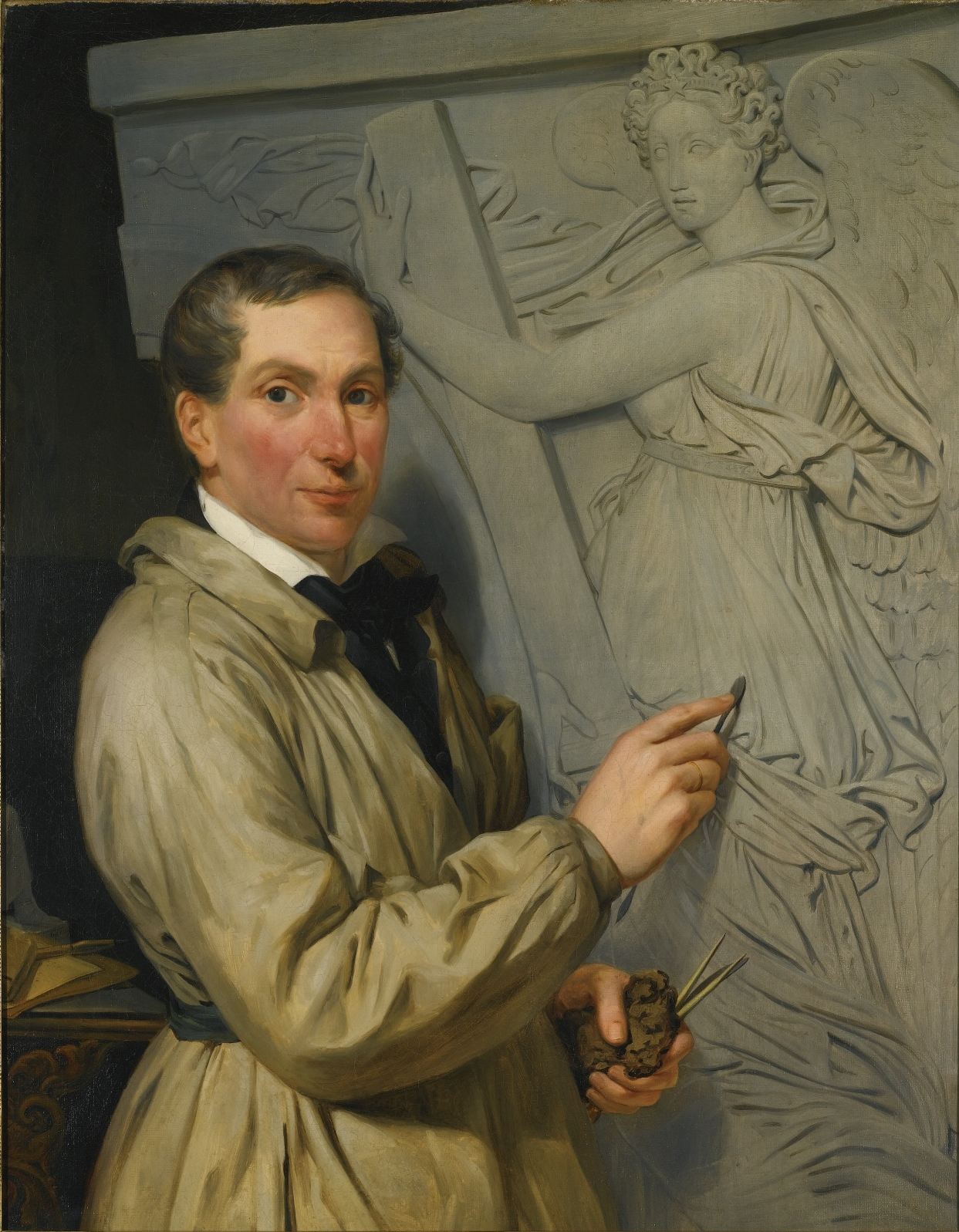
Charles-René Laitié born 6 May

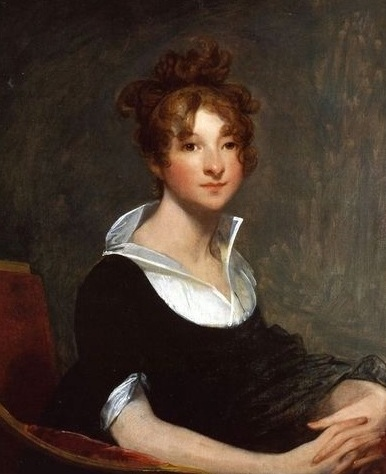
Marcia Van Ness born 9 May

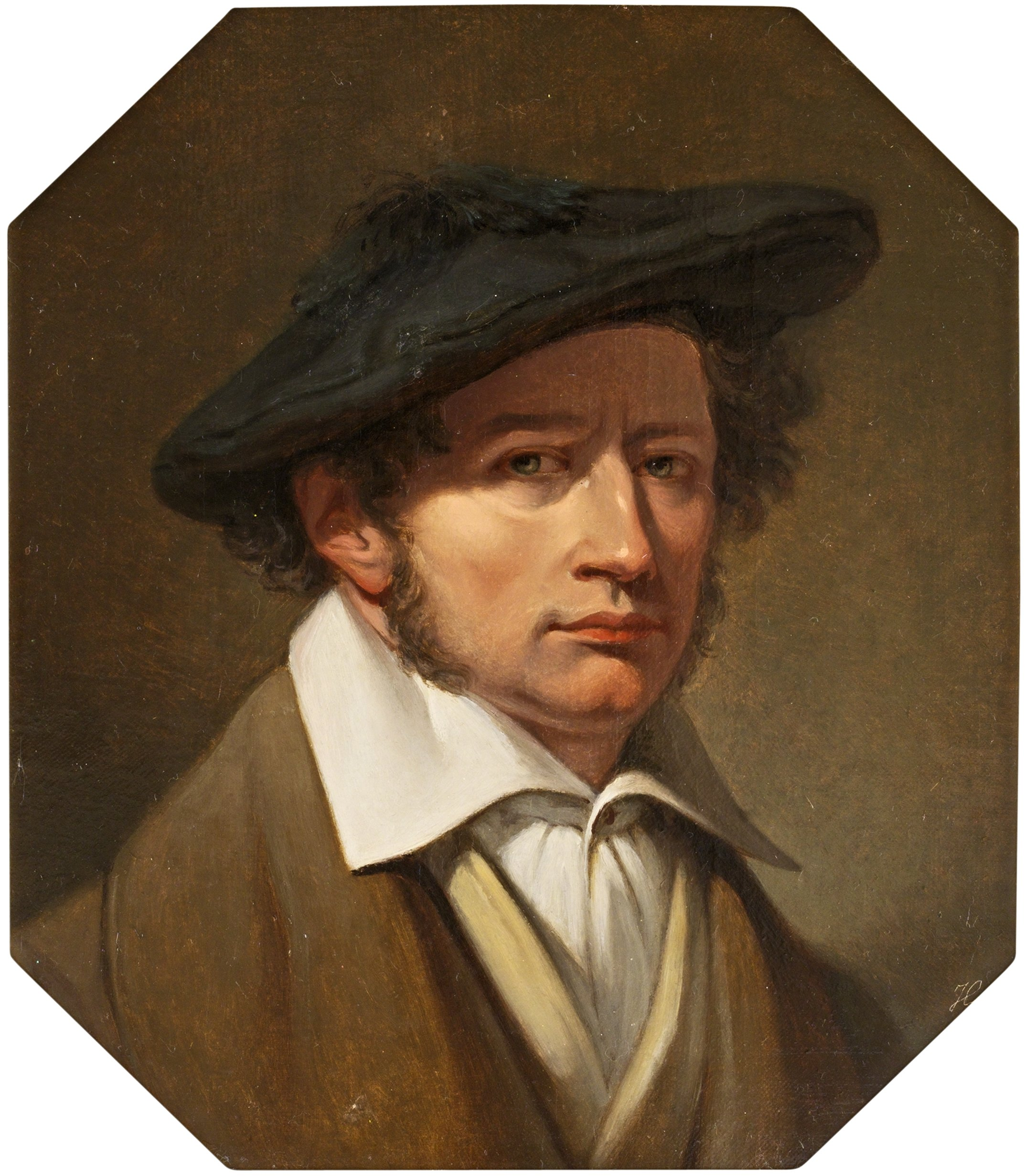
Johan Gustaf Sandberg born 13 May

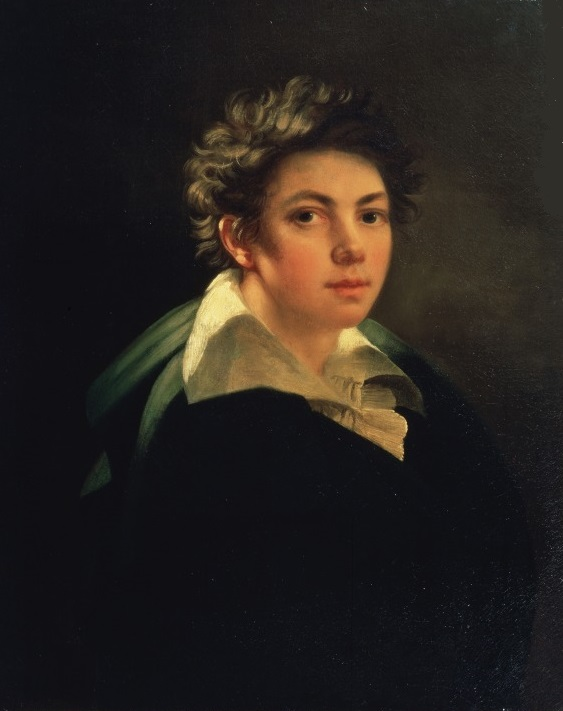
Johann Rombauer born 28 May

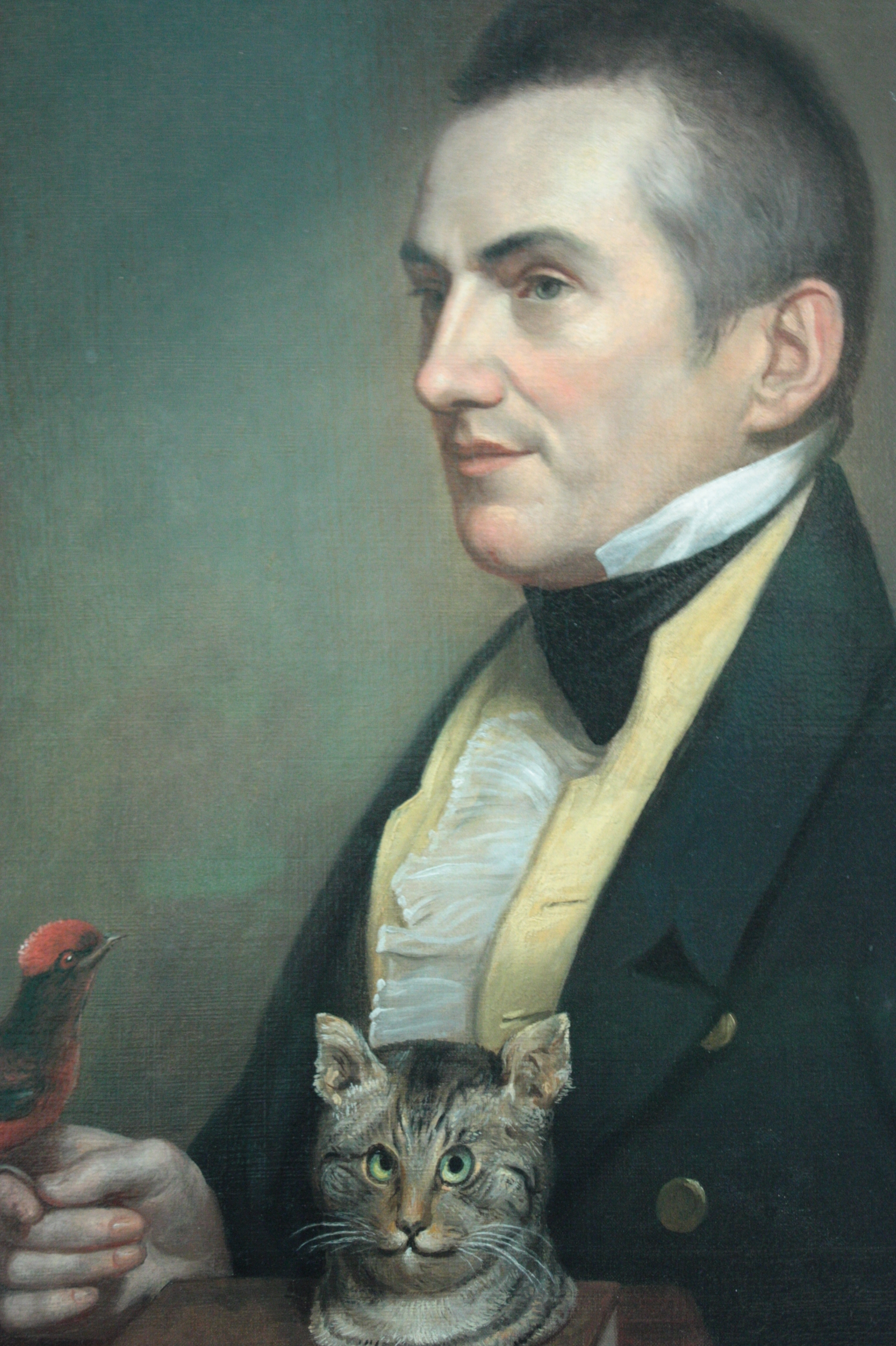
Charles Waterton born 3 June

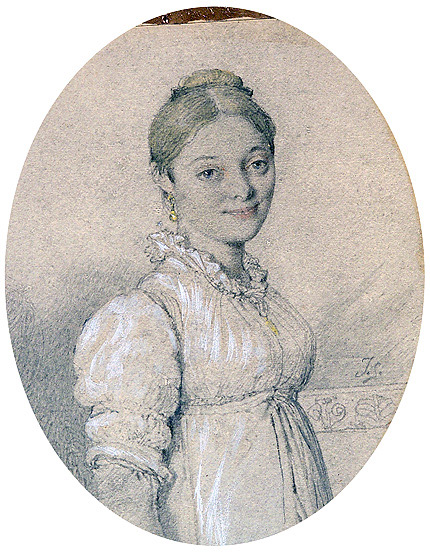
Marie-Anne-Julie Forestier born 13 June

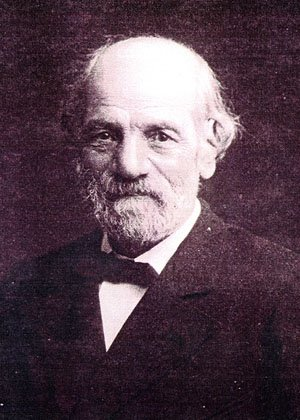
Olry Terquem born 16 June

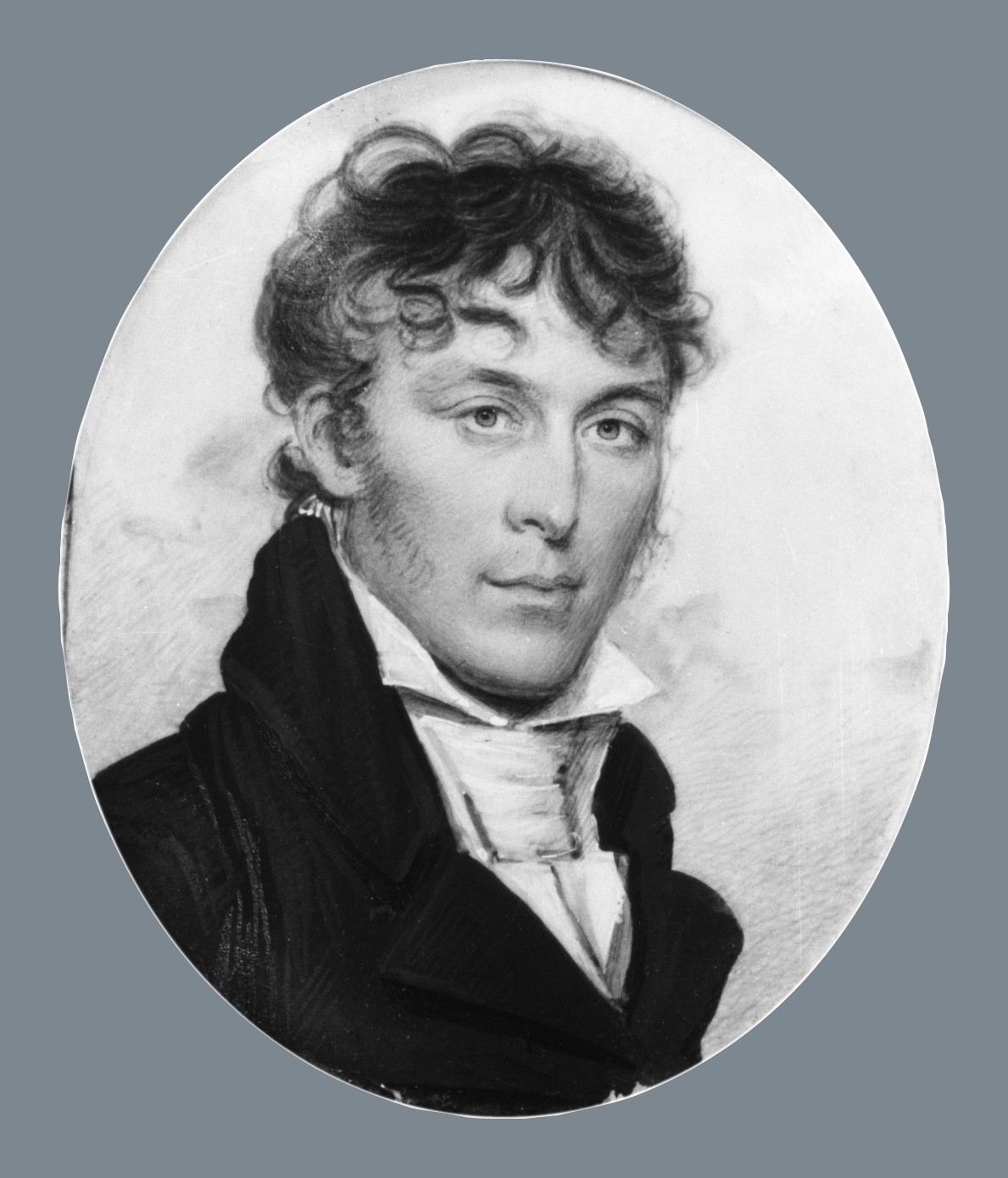
Charles Floyd born 20 June

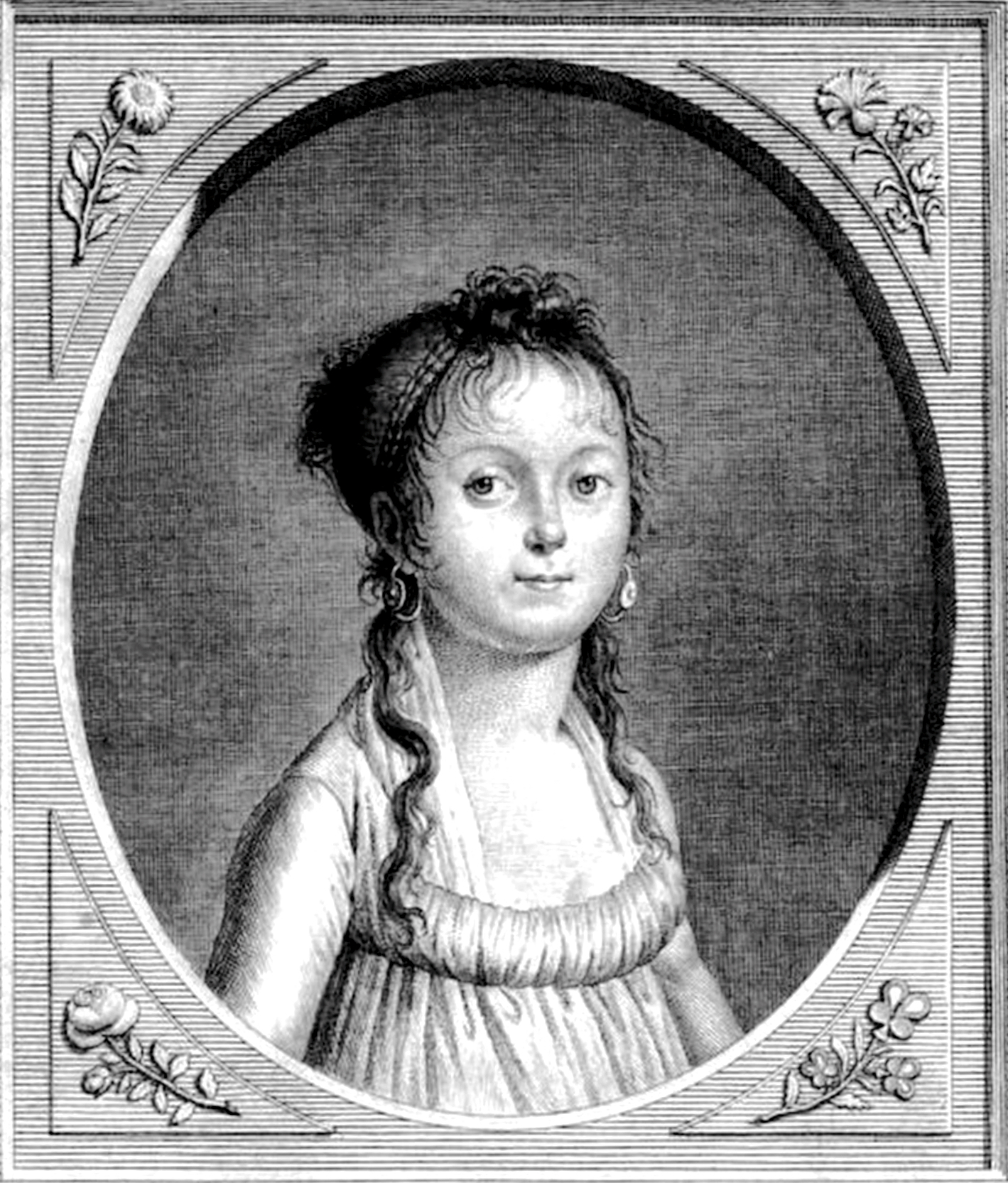
Fortunée Briquet born 26 June

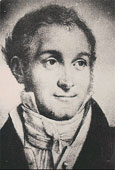
Pierre Berthier born 3 July

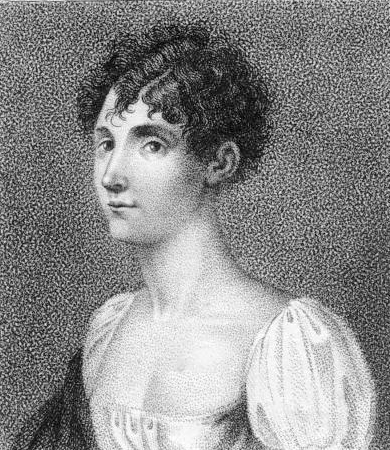
Rosa Morandi born 5 July

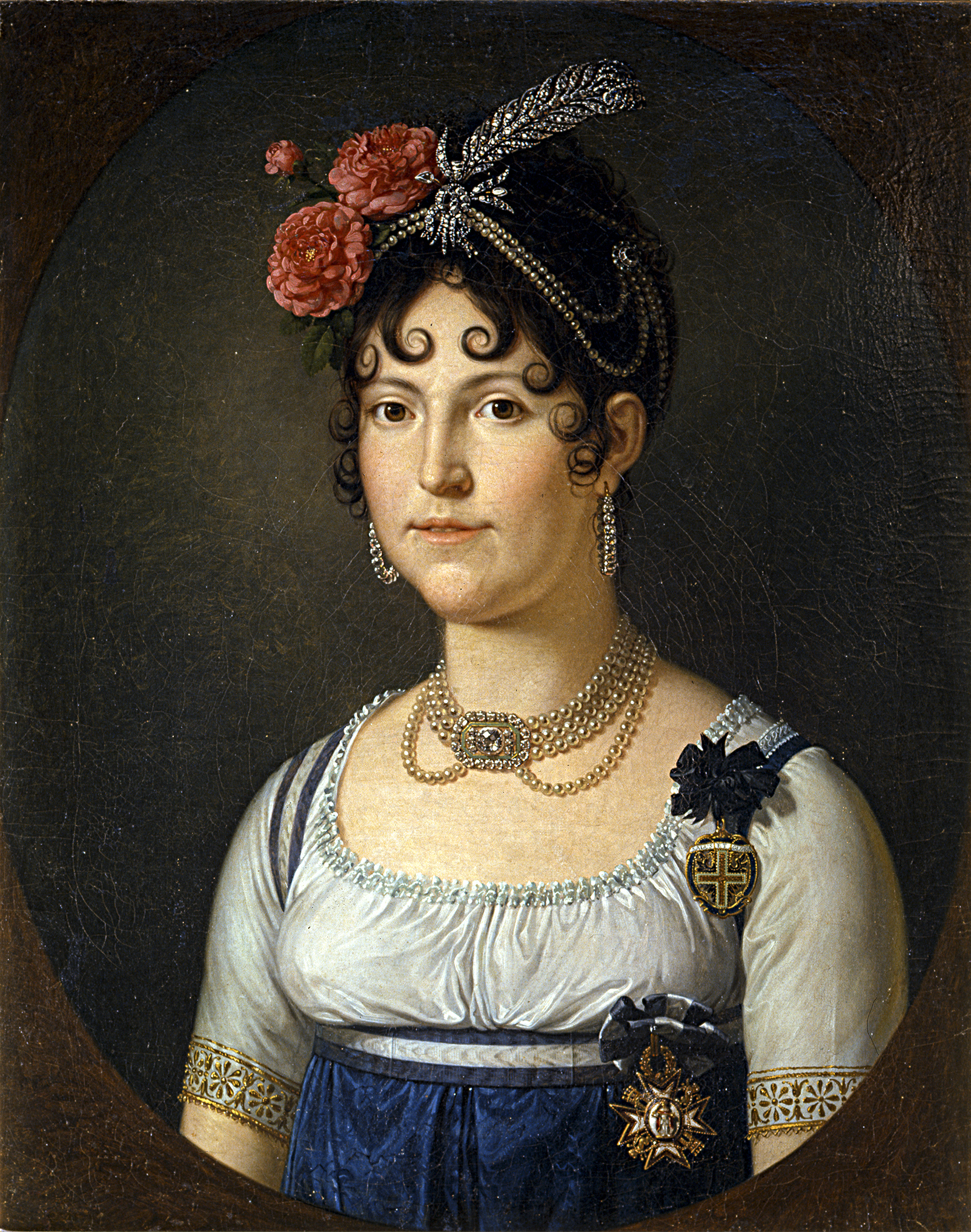
Maria Luisa, Duchess of Lucca born 6 July

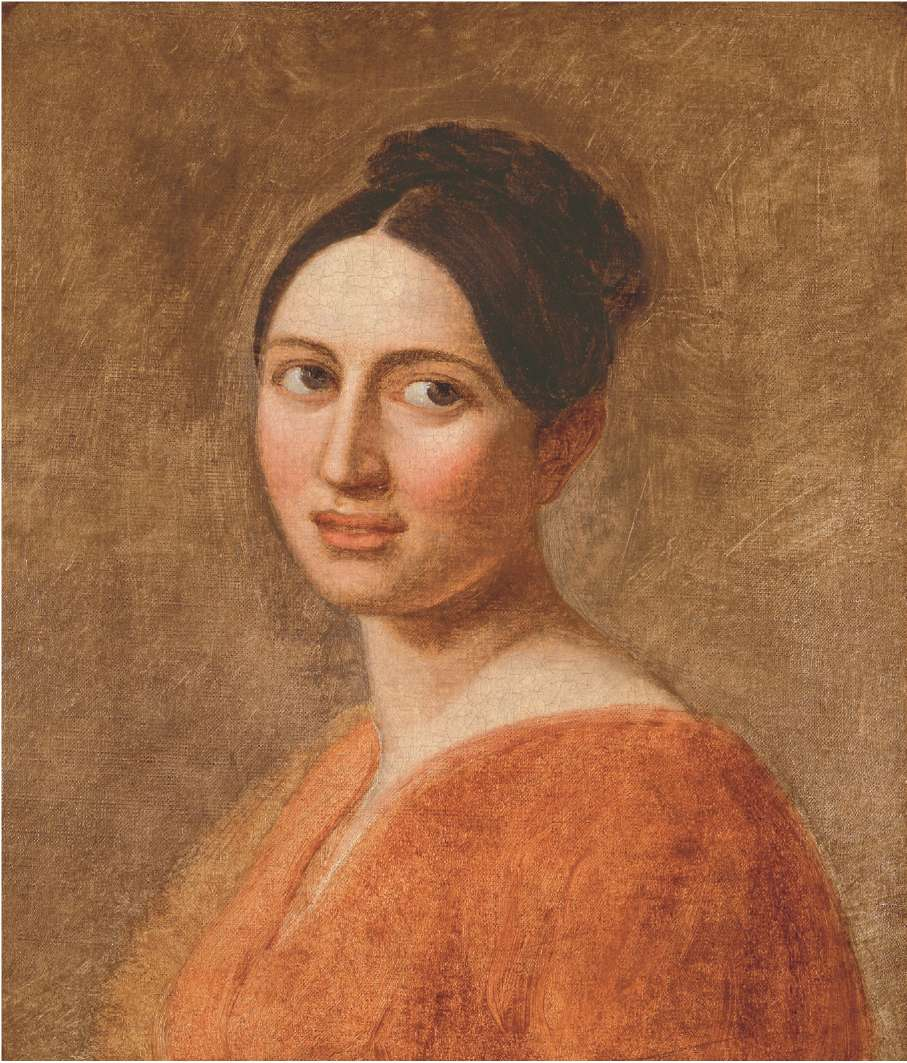
Sophie Ørsted born 16 July

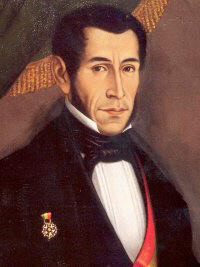
Mariano Enrique Calvo born 18 July

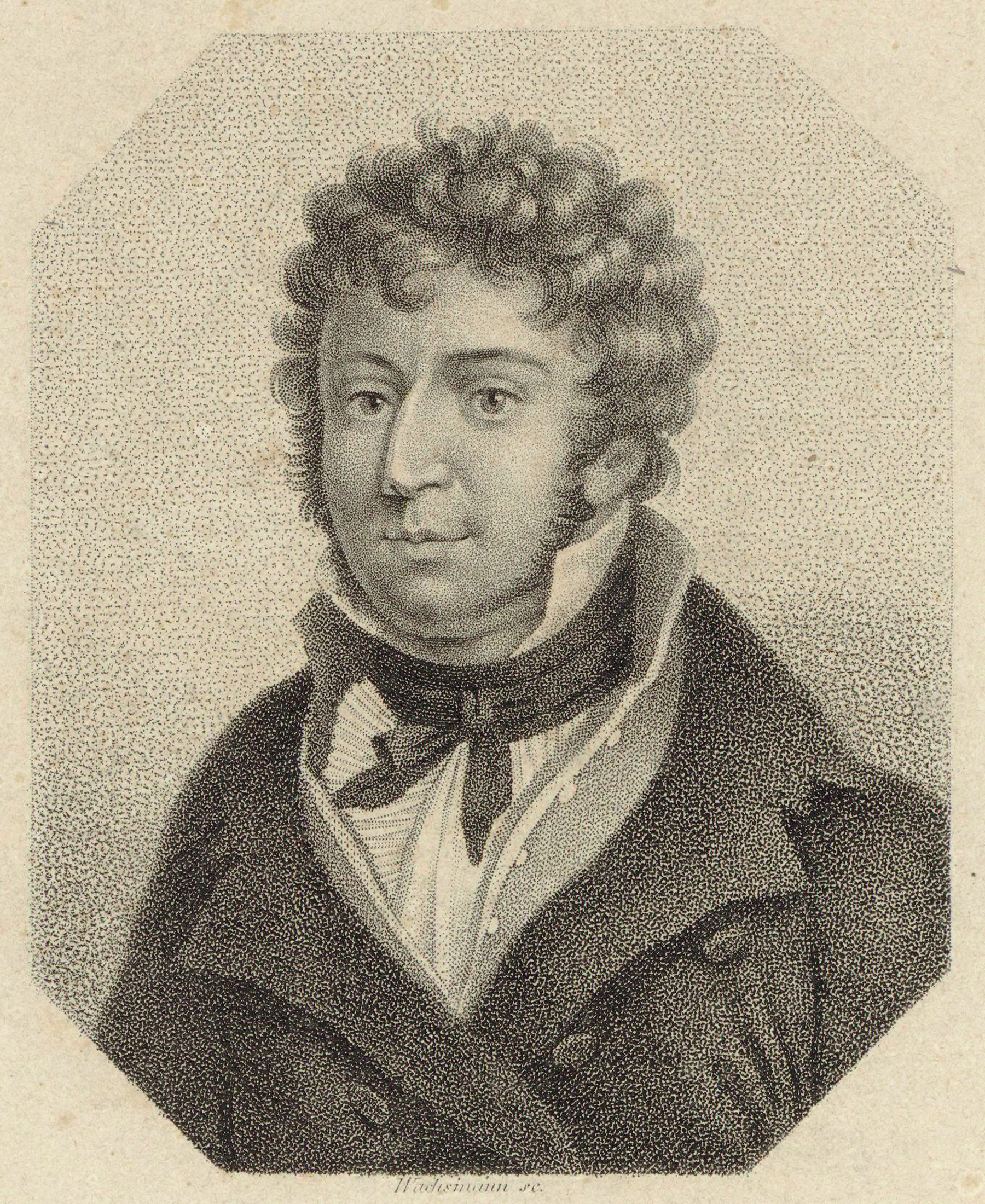
John Field born 26 July

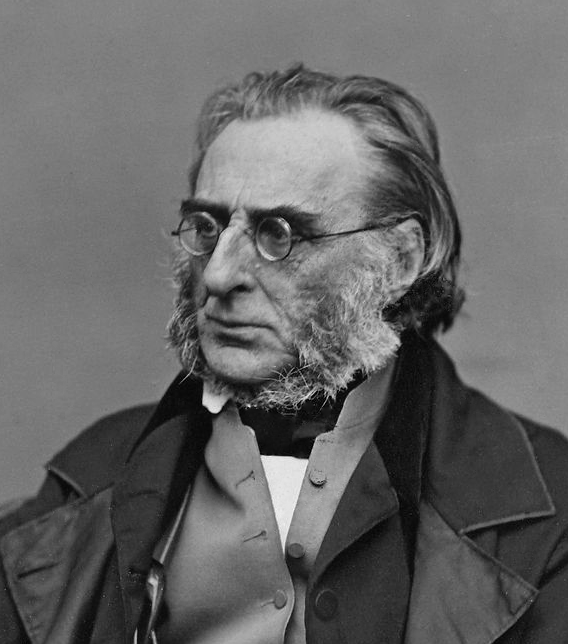
Charles James Napier born 10 August

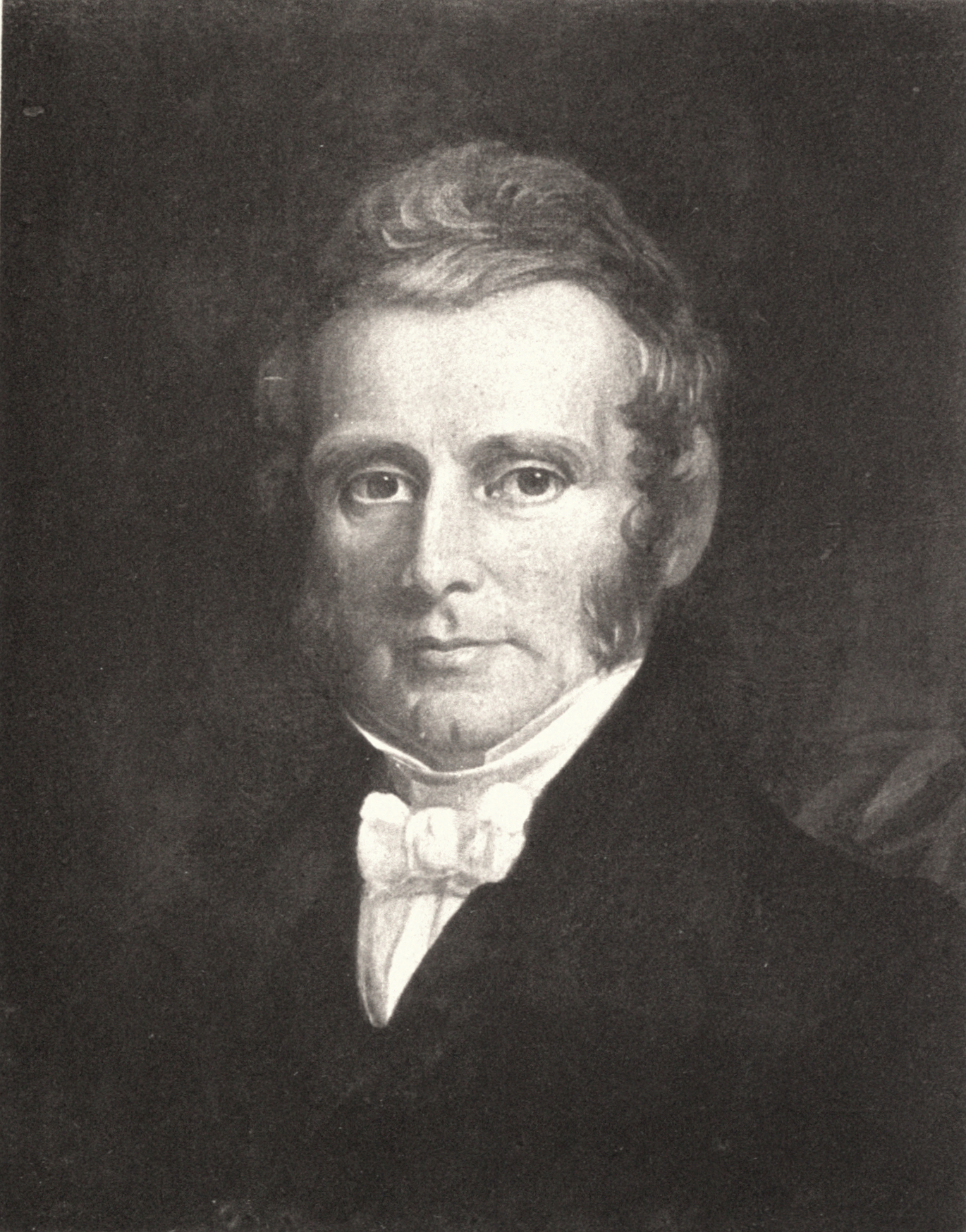
Charles Lowell born 15 August

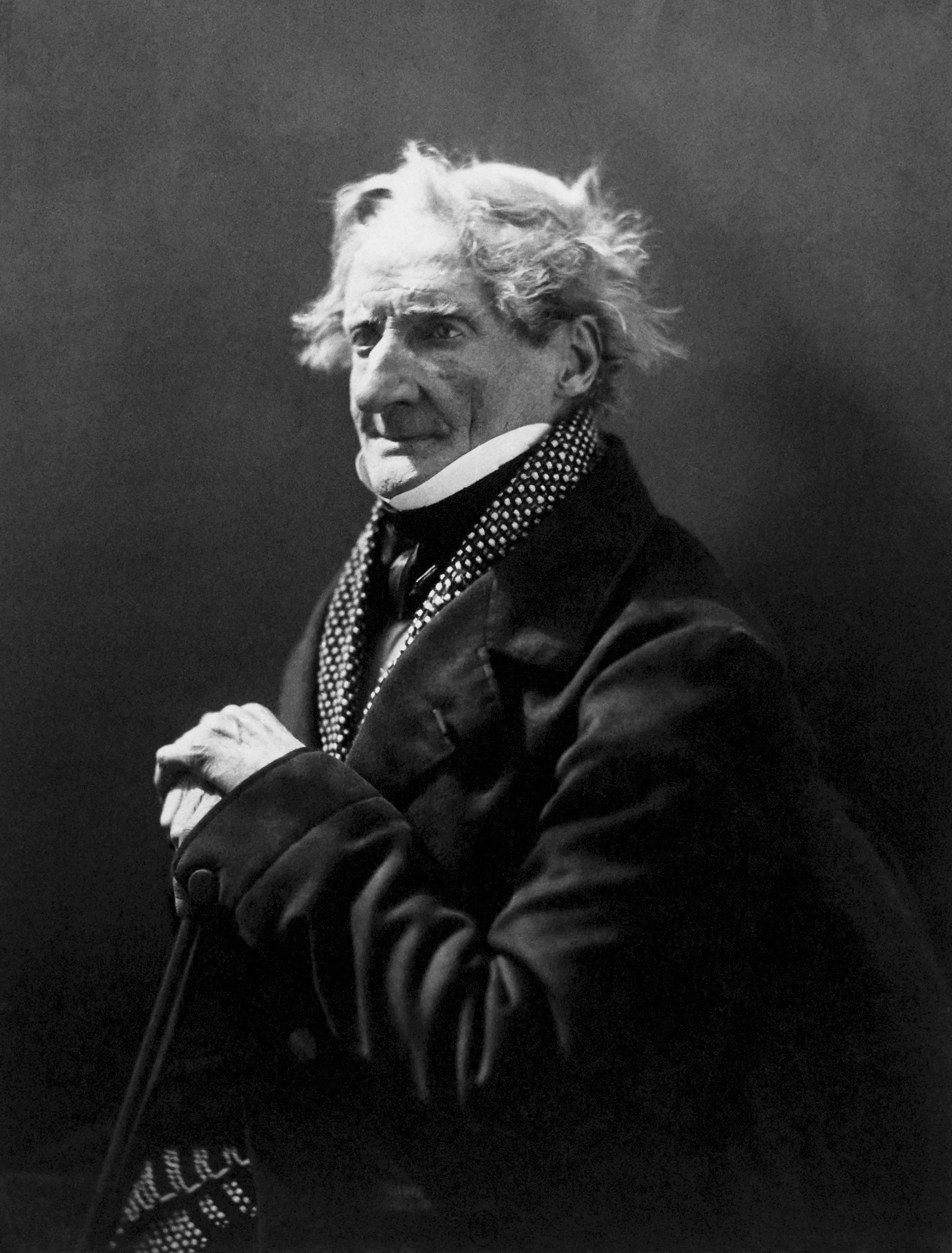
Pierre-Luc-Charles Cicéri born 17 August

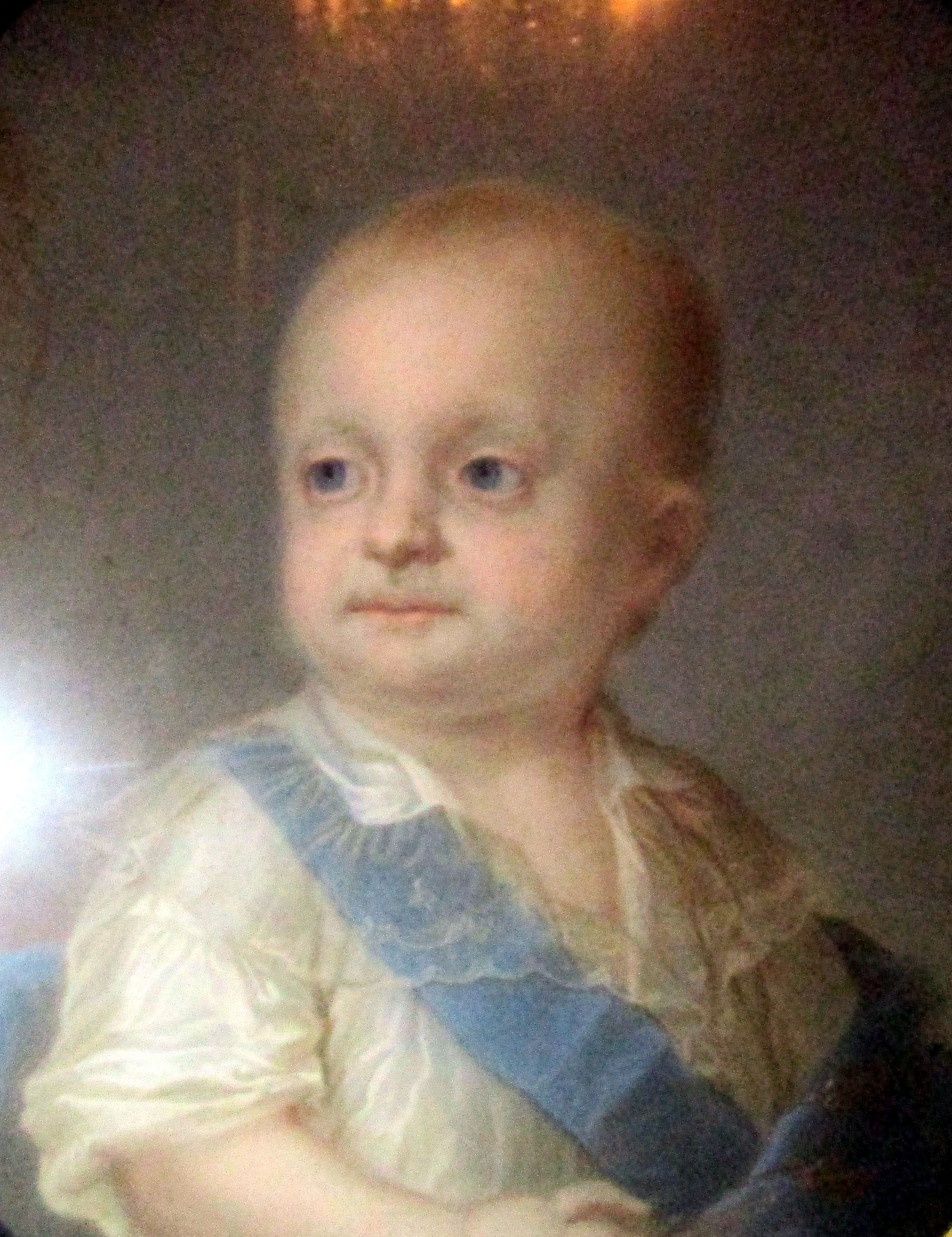
Prince Carl Gustav, Duke of Småland born 25 August

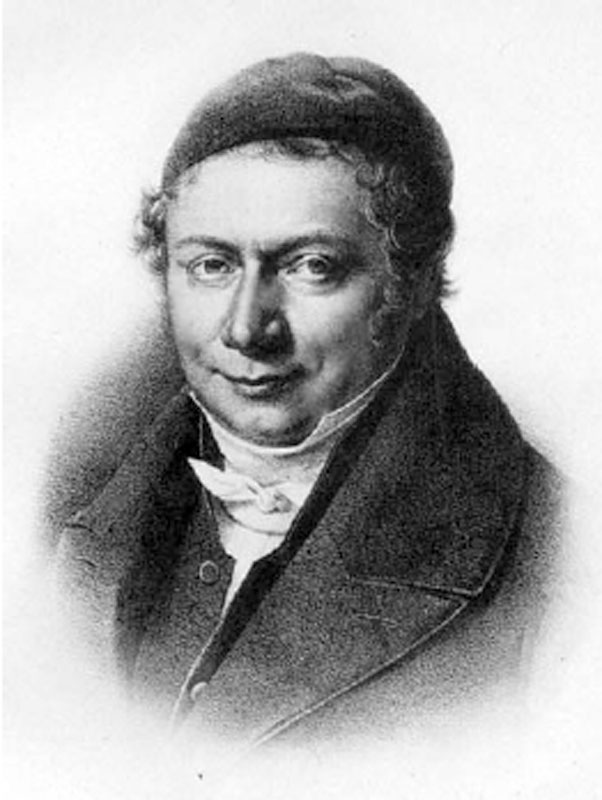
Christian Ludwig Nitzsch born 3 September

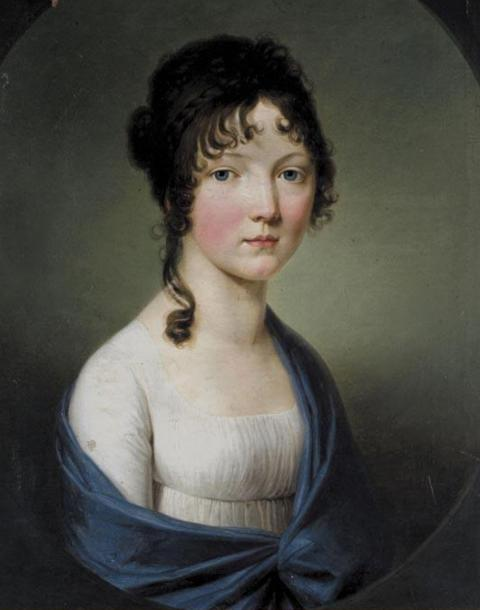
Marie of Baden born 7 September

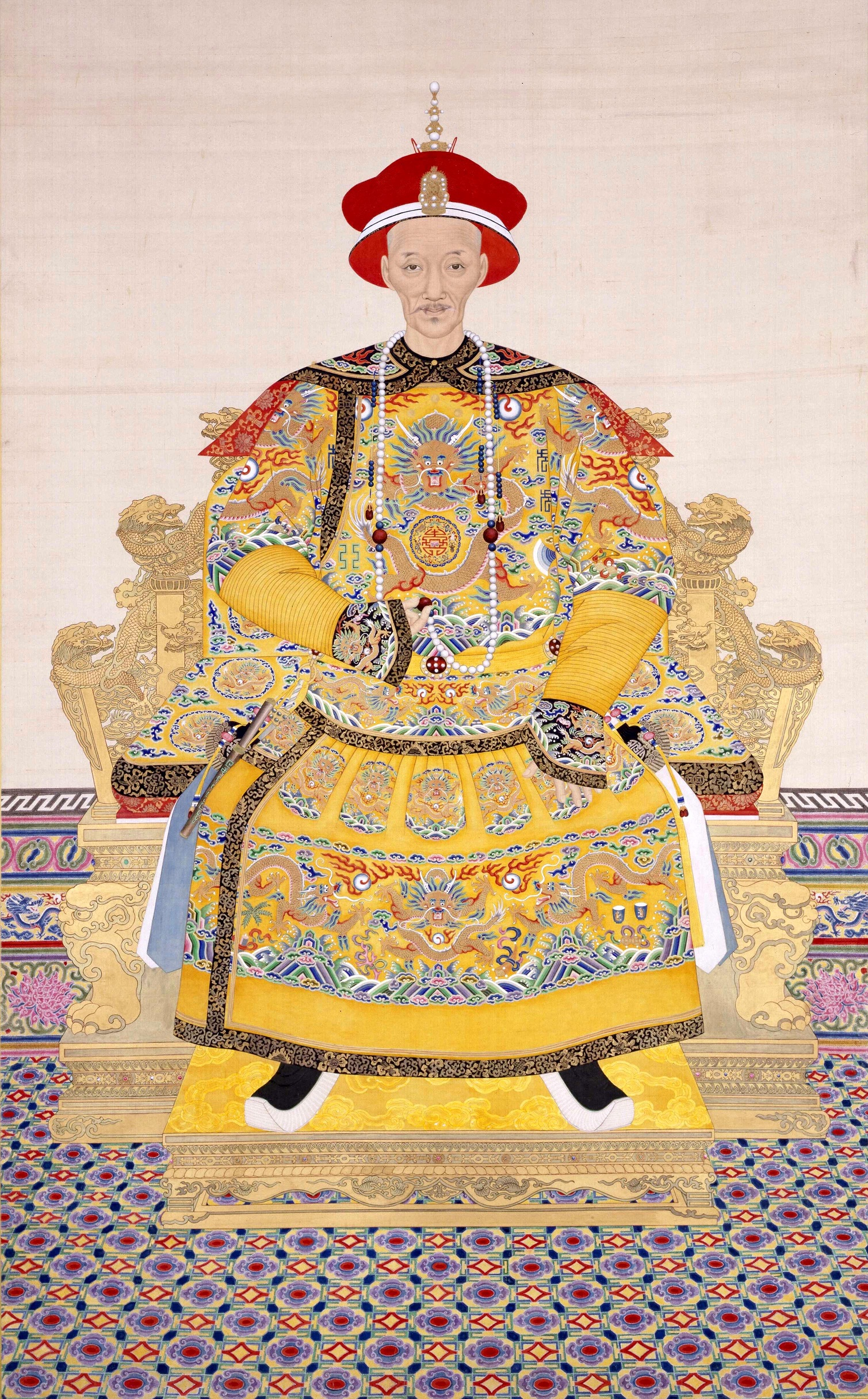
Daoguang Emperor born 16 September

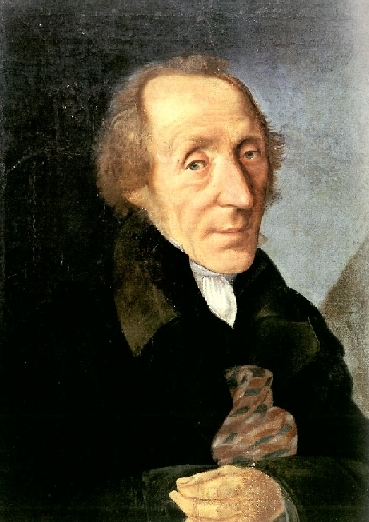
Christoph Hawich born 17 September

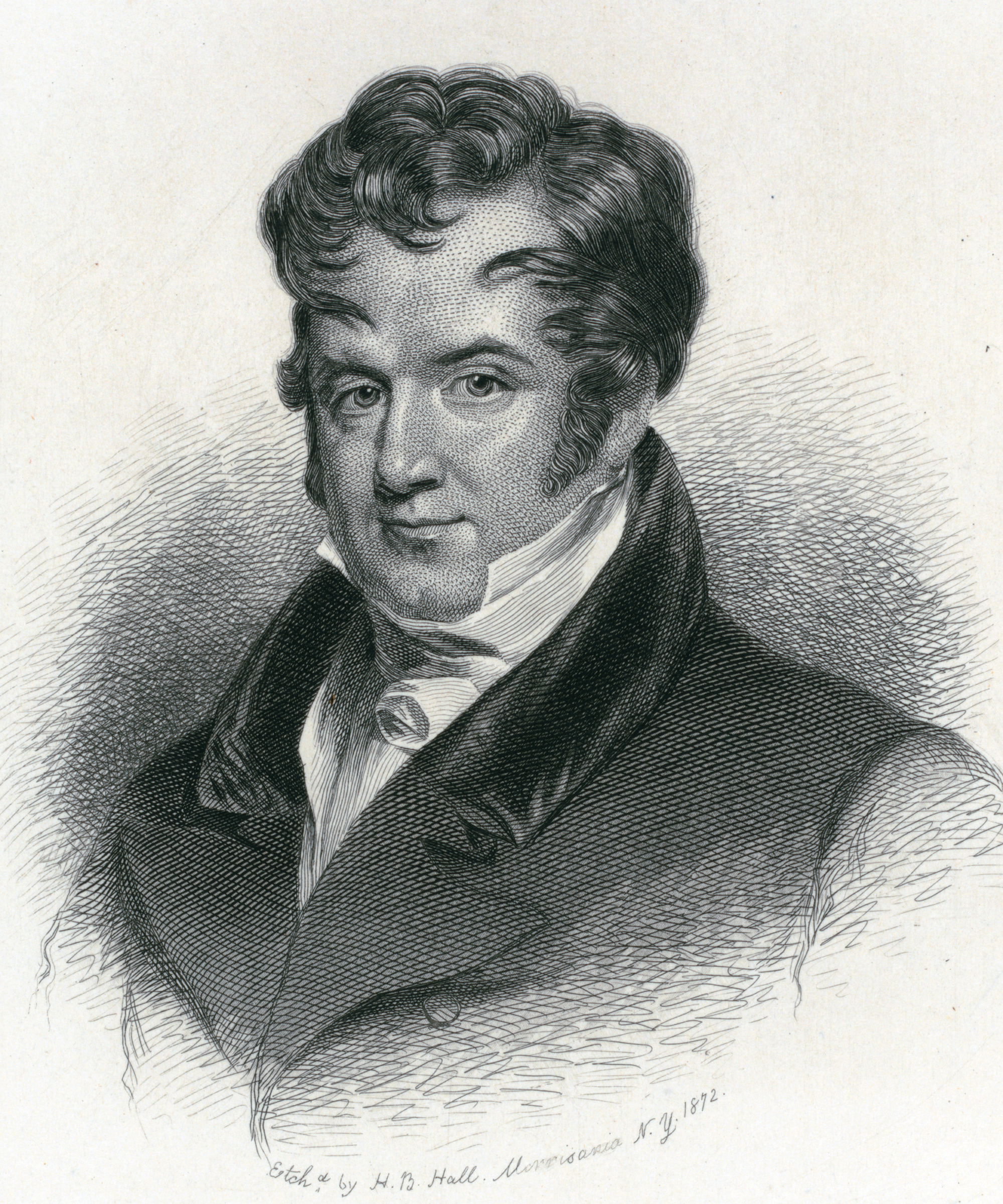
Stephen Price born 25 September

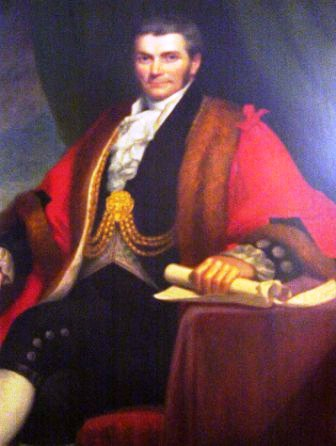
Richard Peek born 3 October

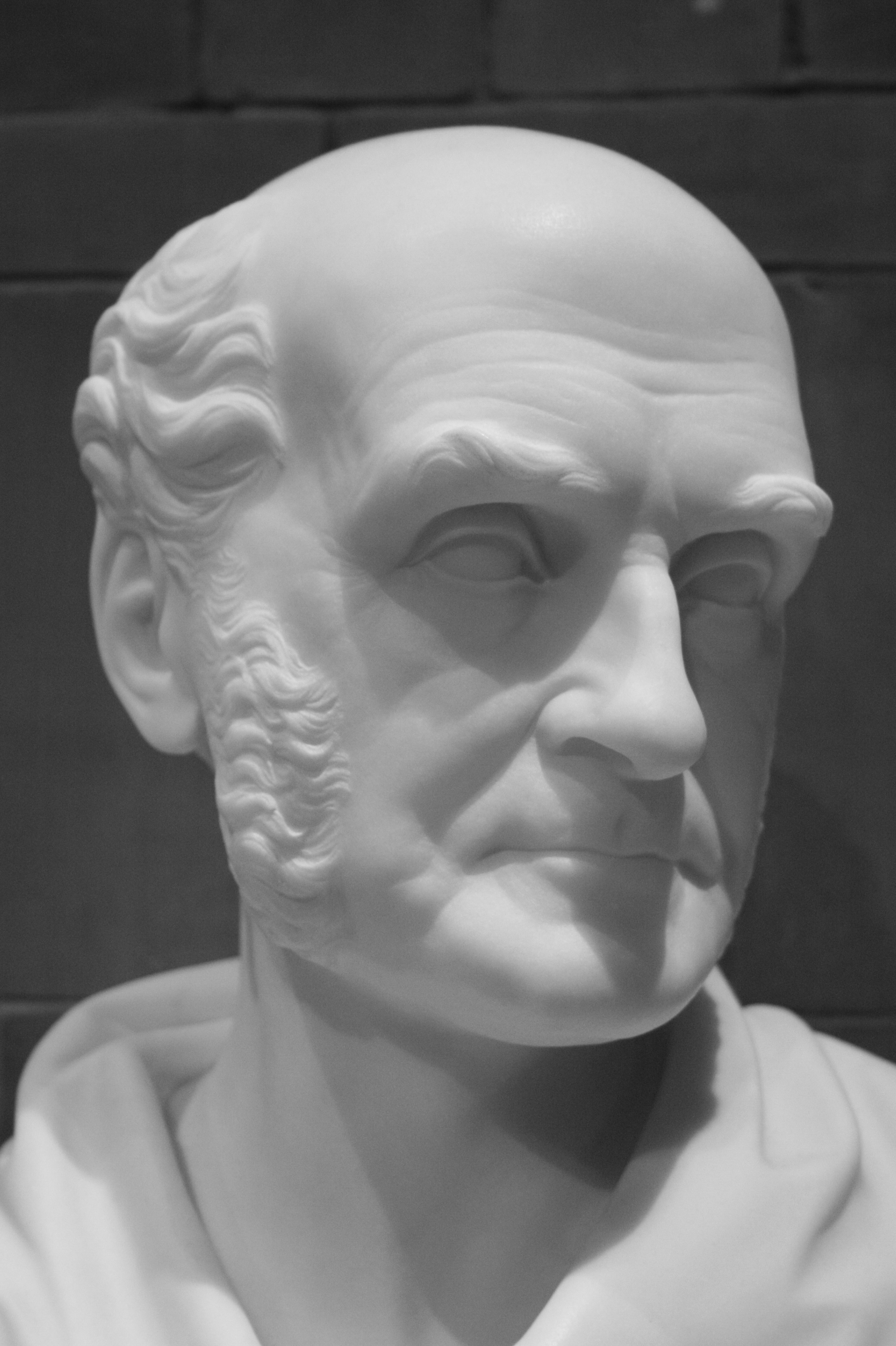
Charles Maclaren born 7 October

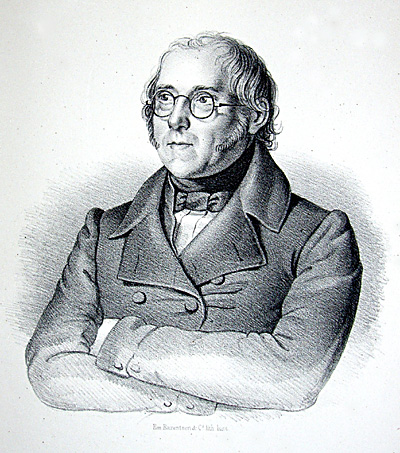
Steen Steensen Blicher born 11 October

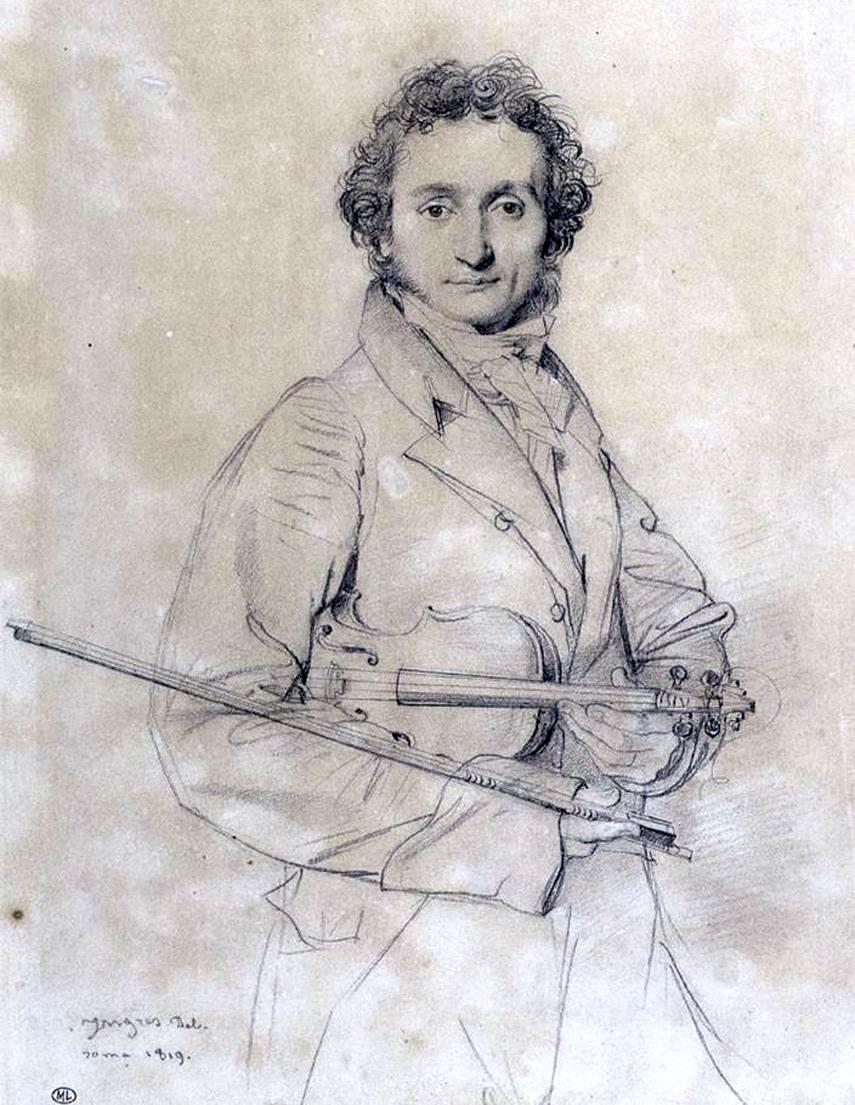
Niccolò Paganini born 27 October

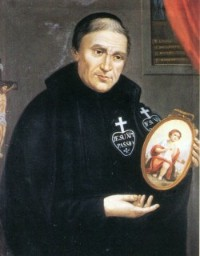
Lorenzo Maria of Saint Francis Xavier born 30 October

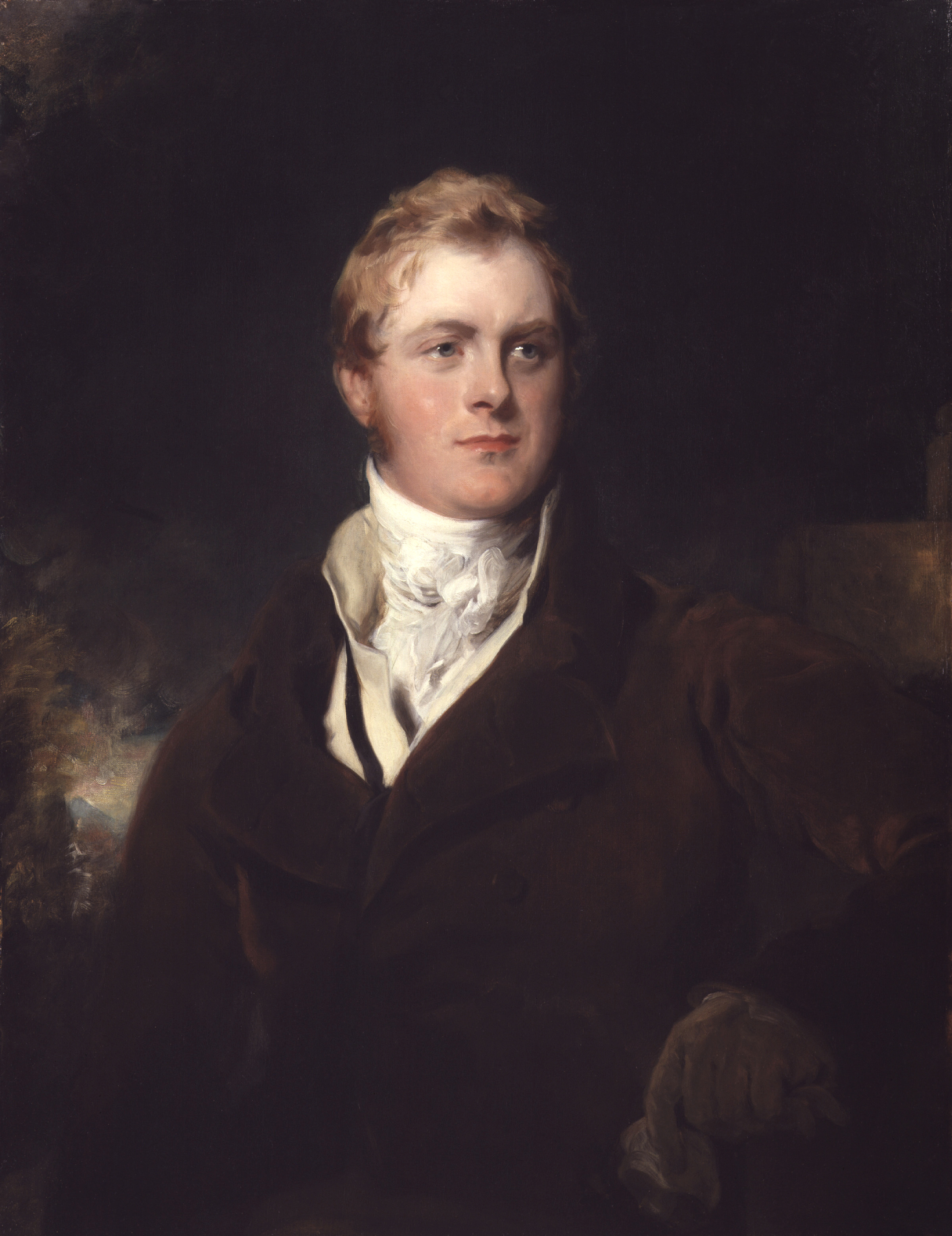
F. J. Robinson born 1 November

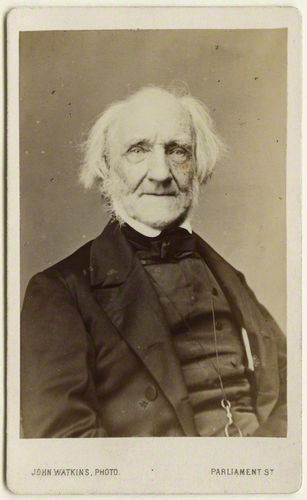
John Pye born 7 November

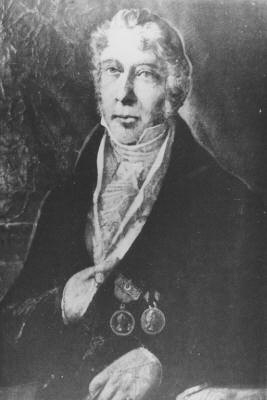
Joseph Kornhäusel born 13 November

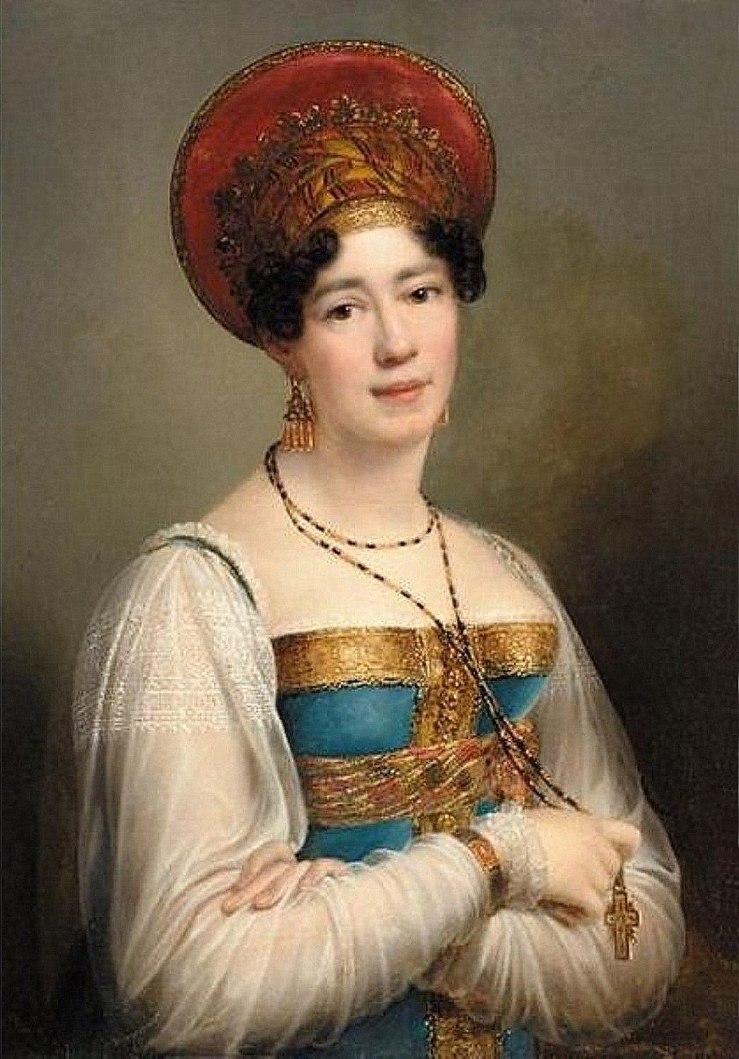
Sophie Swetchine born 22 November

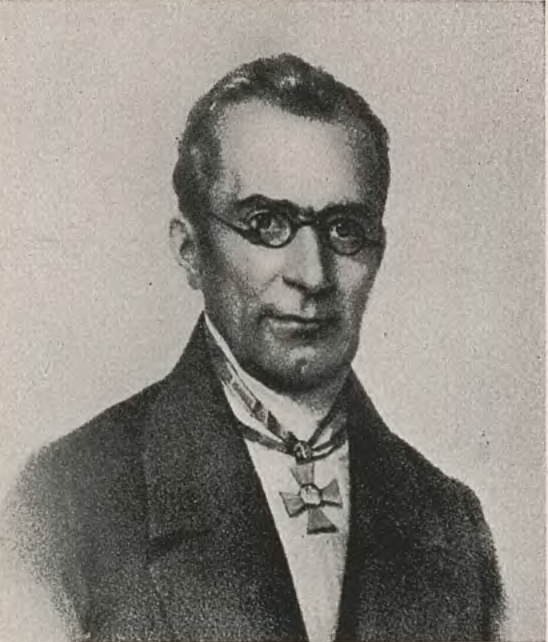
Karl Johann Bernhard Karsten born 26 November

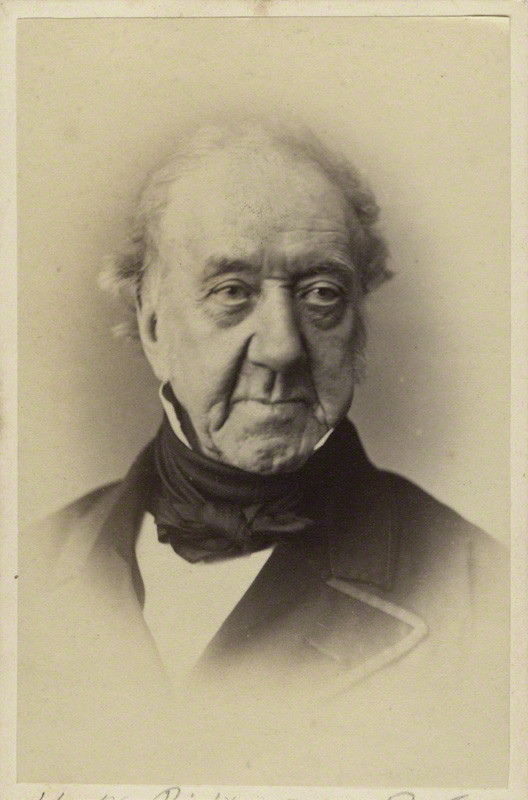
Henry William Pickersgill born 3 December

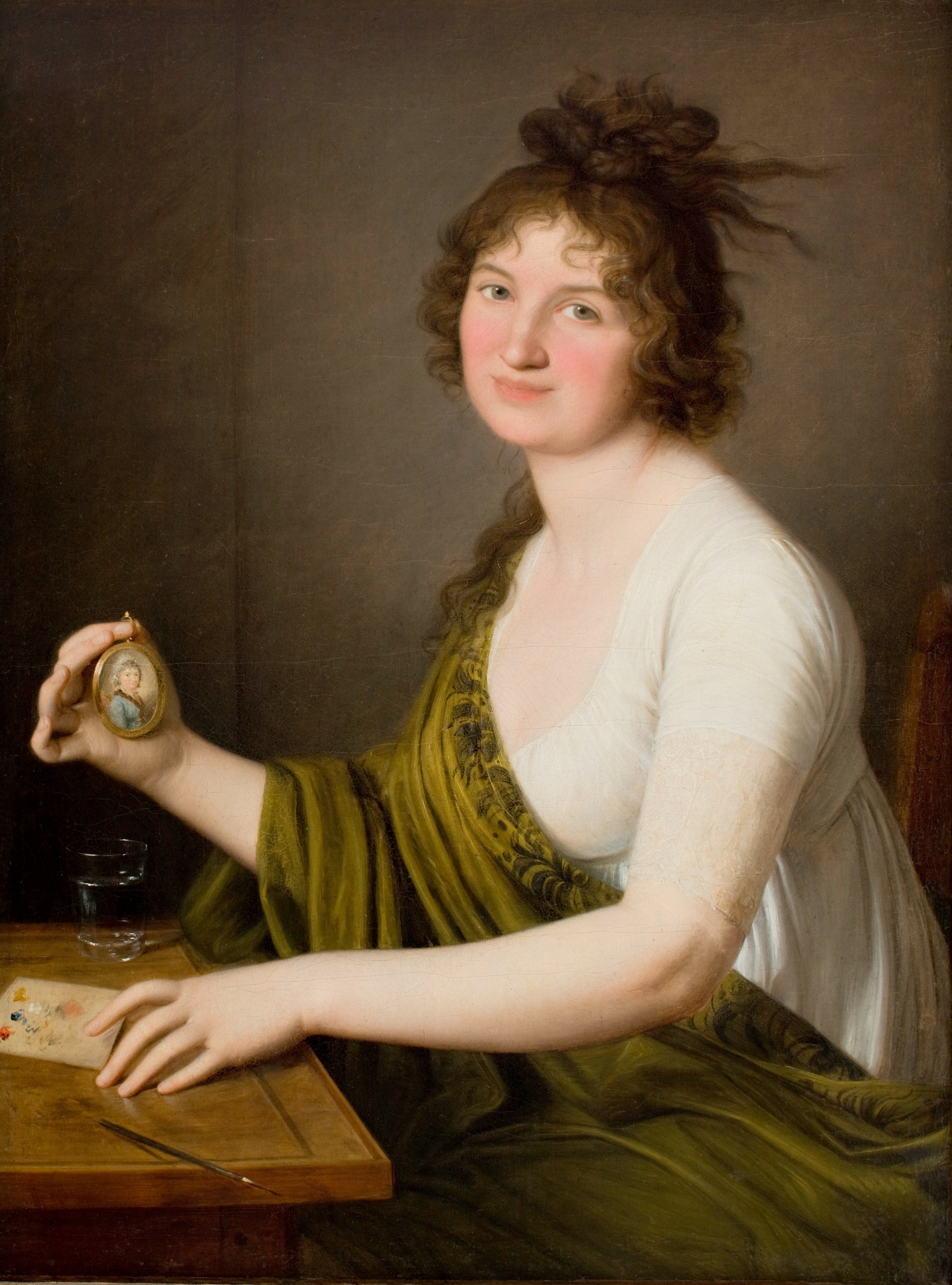
Waleria Tarnowska born 9 December

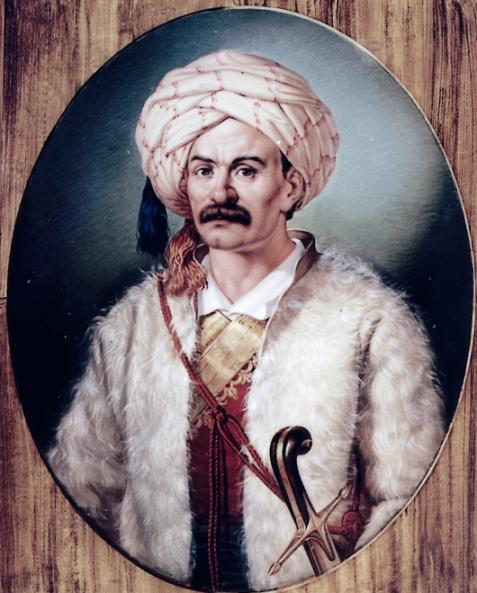
Charles Nicolas Fabvier born 10 December

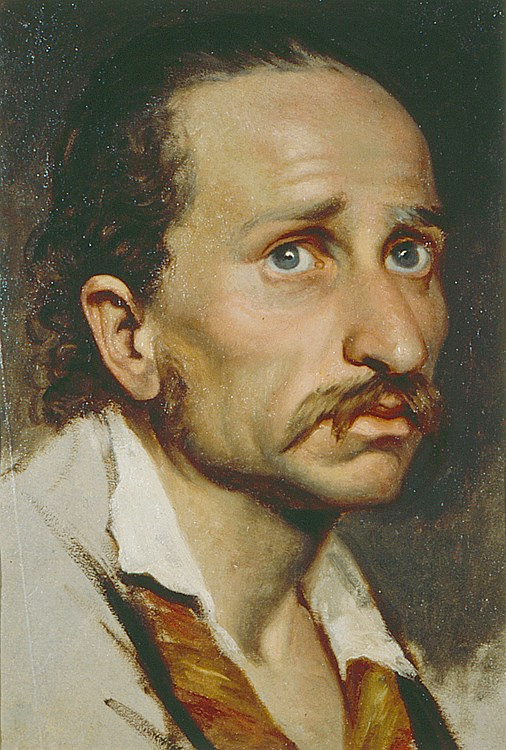
Hans Jakob Oeri born 16 December

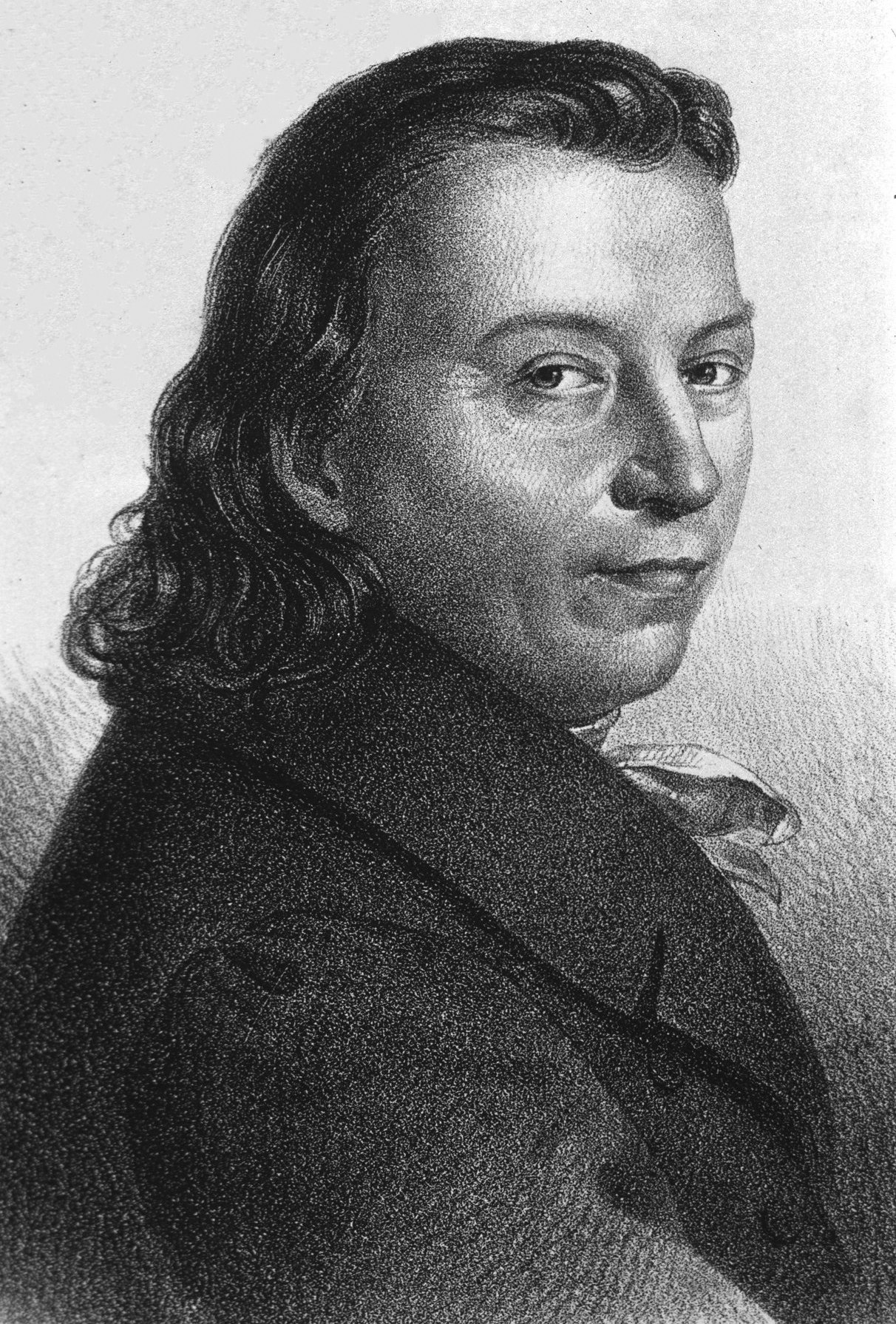
Julius Vincenz von Krombholz born 19 December

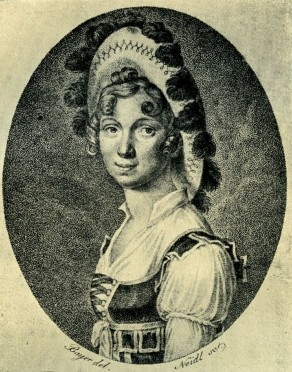
Therese Brunetti born 24 December

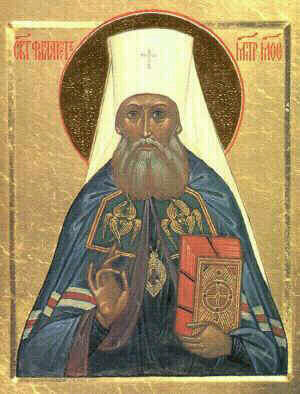
Philaret Drozdov born 26 December

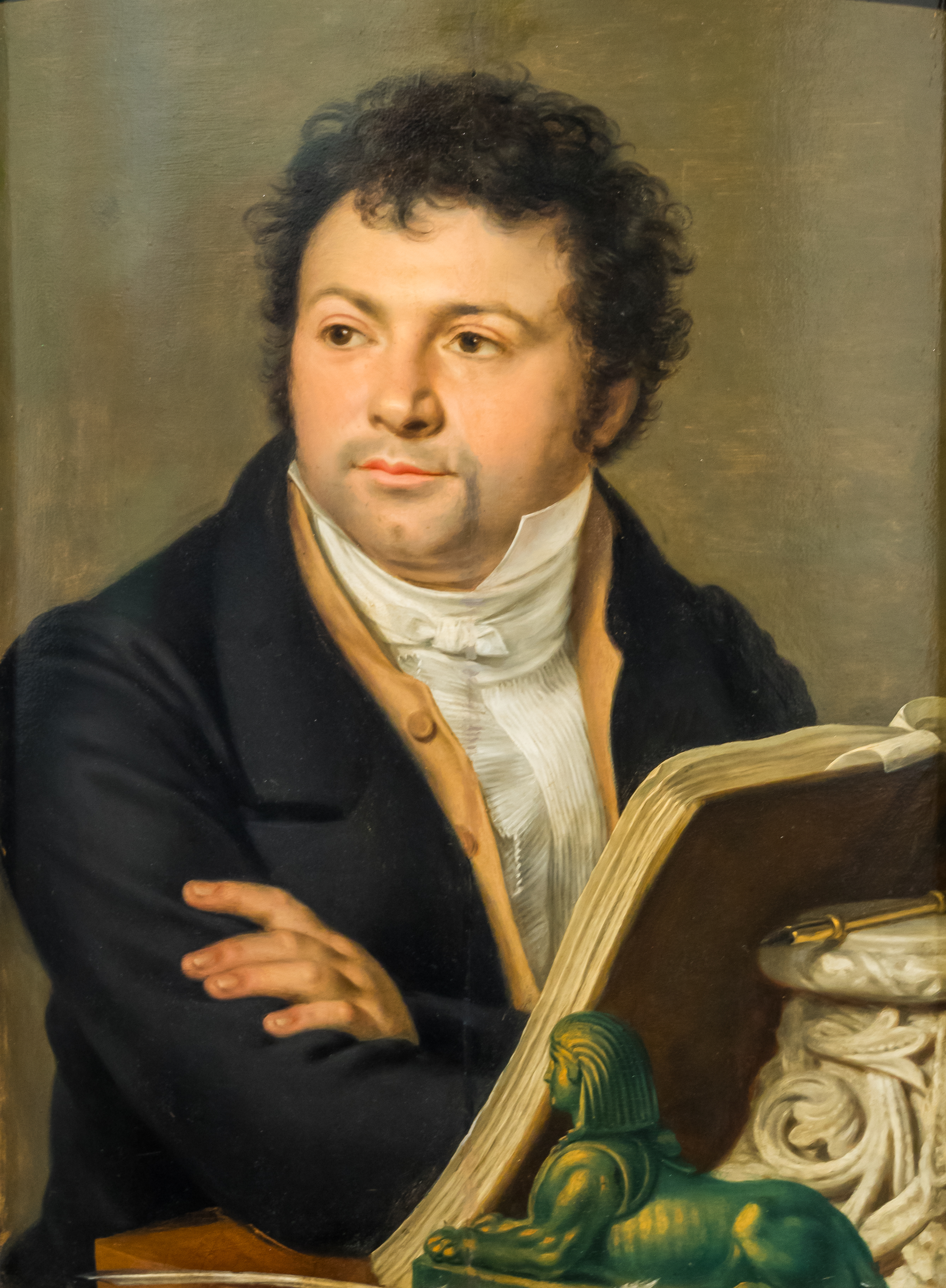
Matthias Joseph de Noël born 28 December

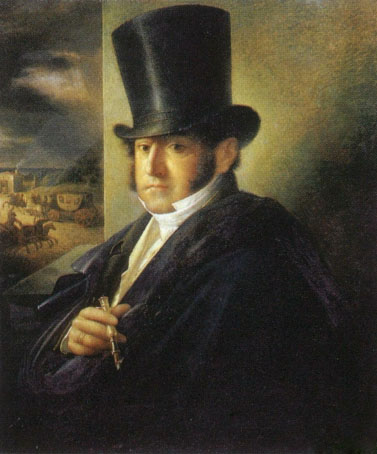
Konstantin Bulgakov born 31 December

=== January ===
- January 1 – John Bell, British army officer (d. 1876)
- January 2
  - Hugo von Bosch, Bavarian general and politician (d. 1865)
  - Hosea Hildreth, educator and minister in Massachusetts and New Hampshire (d. 1835)
  - El Pípila, Mexican miner and freedom fighter (d. 1863)
  - Thomas Starkie, British lawyer (d. 1849)
- January 3
  - Turner Saunders, American preacher (d. 1854)
  - Philipp Franz von Walther, German ophthalmologist (d. 1849)
- January 5 – Robert Morrison, British evangelist and first Protestant missionary in China (d. 1834)
- January 8
  - William Mudford, British journalist and writer (d. 1848)
  - Tommaso Riario Sforza, Italian cardinal (d. 1857)
- January 9 – Benning M. Bean, American politician (d. 1866)
- January 11 – Jean Laforgue, French scholar (d. 1852)
- January 12 – Martin Flint, American politician (d. 1855)
- January 13 – Robert Aspland, English Unitarian minister (d. 1845)
- January 14
  - Carl Ferdinand Langhans, German architect (d. 1869)
  - Stephen Lushington, British judge and Member of Parliament (d. 1873)
  - Thomas Sergeant, American lawyer and politician (d. 1860)
  - Peder Tonning, Norwegian politician (d. 1839)
- January 15
  - Elkanah Kelsey Dare, American composer (d. 1826)
  - Nikolaus Wolfgang Fischer, German physician and chemist (d. 1850)
  - Ōkubo Tadazane, daimyo (d. 1837)
- January 18
  - William Gosset, British Member of Parliament (d. 1848)
  - Daniel Webster, 14th and 19th United States Secretary of State (d. 1852)
- January 19
  - Michel Bibaud, Canadian writer (d. 1857)
  - John J. Chappell, American politician (d. 1871)
  - William Eden, British soldier and politician (d. 1810)
  - William Harris, 2nd Baron Harris, British Army general (d. 1845)
- January 20
  - Archduke John of Austria, Austrian soldier, imperial regent of the German Empire (d. 1859)
  - William Nott, British general (d. 1845)
- January 21
  - Jan George Bertelman, Dutch composer (d. 1854)
  - Afanasy Grigoriev, Russian architect (d. 1868)
  - James Patrick Murray, British politician (d. 1834)
- January 22
  - Philip Hamilton, son of American Founding Father, Alexander Hamilton (d. 1801)
  - Franciszek Ksawery Lampi, Austrian artist (d. 1852)
  - John Mitford, British naval officer and author (d. 1831)
- January 23 – José Francisco Bermúdez, Venezuelan revolutionary (d. 1831)
- January 24 – Charles K. Williams, American politician (d. 1853)
- January 25 – Johann Michael Ackner, Austrian archaeologist (d. 1862)
- January 26
  - William George Keith Elphinstone, British Army general (d. 1842)
  - Cornelius P. Van Ness, American politician (d. 1852)
- January 27
  - John Lea, US epidemiologist (d. 1862)
  - Titumir, Bengali revolutionary (d. 1831)
- January 29
  - Daniel Auber, French composer (d. 1871)
  - Daniel Parker, Adjutant general and inspector general of the US Army (d. 1846)
  - Franciszek Ścigalski, Polish composer and violinist (d. 1846)
- January 30
  - Pierre-Nolasque Bergeret, French painter (d. 1863)
  - James Caulfeild, British politician (d. 1852)
  - Wincenty Krasiński, nobleman, political activist and military leader (d. 1858)
  - Ann Taylor, British poet and literary critic (d. 1866)

=== February ===
- February 1 – Bill Johnston, American pirate (d. 1870)
- February 2
  - James Chalmers, alleged Scottish inventor of the adhesive postage stamp (d. 1853)
  - Henri de Rigny, commander of the French squadron at the Battle of Navarino in the Greek War of Independence (d. 1835)
- February 3
  - John Macdonald Kinneir, British diplomat (d. 1830)
  - John Lamont, Scottish sugar planter in Trinidad (d. 1850)
  - William Pinnock, British publisher and educational writer (d. 1843)
  - Ansel Sterling, American politician (d. 1853)
- February 4
  - Charles William Grant, 5th Baron de Longueuil (d. 1848)
  - Henry Lee, US political economist (d. 1867)
- February 6 – Fyodor Tolstoy, Russian explorer (d. 1846)
- February 8
  - Friedrich Ernst Ludwig von Fischer, Russian botanist (d. 1854)
  - Juan Cuevas Perales, Spanish composer (d. 1855)
  - Malla Silfverstolpe, Swedish salon-holder (d. 1861)
- February 9
  - William Havell, British artist (d. 1857)
  - Philip Shuttleworth, English churchman and academic, Bishop of Chichester (d. 1842)
- February 10
  - Robert Hallowell Gardiner, American land owner (d. 1864)
  - Jean-Marie-Nicolas Lucas de Montigny, French magistrate (d. 1852)
  - Niels Arntzen Sem, Norwegian politician (d. 1859)
  - Ashur Ware, United States federal judge (d. 1873)
- February 11
  - William Lowndes, American politician, enslaver (d. 1822)
  - Henri Jean de Rouvroy, Marquis of Saint-Simon, French soldier, diplomat, politician, officer (d. 1865)
- February 12 – Auguste de Schonen, French politician (d. 1849)
- February 14
  - Eleanora Atherton, English philanthropist (d. 1870)
  - Ephraim Sturdivant, American veteran (d. 1868)
- February 15
  - John H. Dent, United States Navy officer (d. 1823)
  - William Miller, American religious leader (d. 1849)
  - Louis Perrin, Irish politician (d. 1864)
- February 17 – Thomas Baxter, British artist (d. 1821)
- February 19
  - Christopher Anderson, theological writer and preacher (d. 1852)
  - Henry Bentley, English first-class cricketer (d. 1857)
  - Princess Pauline, Duchess of Sagan, Princess of Courland (d. 1845)
- February 22
  - Karl Stefan Aichelburg, Austrian musician (d. 1817)
  - James Towers English, Irish military commander (d. 1819)
  - John Gebhard, American politician (d. 1854)
  - Johann Friedrich Ludwig Hausmann, German mineralogist (d. 1859)
- February 23
  - John Wilson Campbell, US federal judge (d. 1833)
  - Peder Nielsen Hemb, Norwegian politician (d. 1850)
  - Johann Baptist Emanuel Pohl, Austrian botanist, entomologist, geologist, physician (d. 1834)
- February 24 – Thomas Uwins, British artist (d. 1857)
- February 25 – William Sturgis, American merchant and politician (d. 1863)
- February 26 – Louise Antoinette Lannes, Duchess of Montebello, French noble (d. 1856)
- February 27 – Marie Thérèse Haze, Belgian Religious Sister and foundress, beatified (d. 1876)
- February 28 – Josef Božek, Czech engineer and inventor (d. 1835)

=== March ===
- March 1 – Suzanne le Peletier de Saint-Fargeau, French noblewoman (d. 1829)
- March 2
  - Isaac Pocock, English dramatist and painter (d. 1835)
  - Edward Sheldon, politician (d. 1836)
- March 3
  - Joseph Edson, US Marshal for Vermont (d. 1832)
  - Jean-Baptiste Sanson de Pongerville, French writer and librarian (d. 1870)
- March 4
  - Gabriel-Alexandre Belle, French writer (d. 1855)
  - Johann Rudolf Wyss, Swiss writer (d. 1830)
- March 5 – Wacław Hański, Polish noble (d. 1841)
- March 6
  - Andreas Bonnevie, Norwegian politician (d. 1833)
  - Karoline von Woltmann, German translator and writer (d. 1847)
- March 7
  - Henryka Beyer, Polish artist (d. 1855)
  - Angelo Mai, cardinal and philologist in Italy (d. 1854)
  - Charles Sterrett Ridgely, American land developer and legislator (d. 1847)
- March 8 – Nicoll Halsey, American politician (d. 1865)
- March 9 – Jean-François Boch, Luxembourgish industrialist and politician (d. 1858)
- March 10
  - Ferdinand Gottlieb von Gmelin, German physician, natural historian, chemist and explorer (d. 1848)
  - Charles Gray, Captain in the Royal Marines (d. 1851)
- March 13
  - Sir Robert Bateson, 1st Baronet, Irish politician (d. 1863)
  - Orest Kiprensky, Russian artist (d. 1836)
  - Jacob Krebs, American politician (d. 1847)
  - Ivan Leontiev, Imperial Russian general who fought in the Napoleonic Wars (d. 1824)
- March 14
  - Thomas Hart Benton, State Senator from Tennessee (d. 1858)
  - Nathaniel F. Williams, American politician (d. 1864)
- March 16
  - William Graham, Indiana politician (d. 1858)
  - Vasili Krasovsky, Russian writer (d. 1824)
- March 17
  - Billy Caldwell, British-Potawatomi and American fur trader (d. 1841)
  - Franz Körte, German agronomist (d. 1845)
  - Sophie von Kühn, German noble (d. 1797)
  - John Styles, English Congregational minister and animal rights writer (d. 1849)
- March 18
  - John C. Calhoun, vice president of the United States (d. 1850)
  - José Gabriel de Silva-Bazán, 10th Marquess of Santa Cruz, Spanish diplomat and politician (d. 1839)
- March 19
  - Wilhelm von Biela, Austrian astronomer (d. 1856)
  - Peter Drummond-Burrell, 22nd Baron Willoughby de Eresby, English politician (d. 1865)
- March 20 – James Tod, English officer of the British East India Company, oriental scholar (d. 1835)
- March 21 – Józef Goldtmann, Polish priest (d. 1852)
- March 22 – James Parke, 1st Baron Wensleydale, British barrister and judge (d. 1868)
- March 23
  - William C. Bradley, American politician (d. 1867)
  - John Sudam, American politician (d. 1835)
- March 24
  - Aglaé Auguié, French court official (d. 1854)
  - William Owsley, 16th Governor of Kentucky (d. 1862)
- March 25
  - Caroline Bonaparte, Queen of Naples and Sicily (d. 1839)
  - Edward Grey, British Anglican bishop of Hereford (d. 1837)
- March 26
  - Charles-Maurice Descombes, French playwright and literary critic (d. 1869)
  - Benjamin Joseph Frobisher, Canadian politician (d. 1821)
- March 29
  - Thomas Bryn, father of the Constitution of Norway, member of Stortinget (d. 1827)
  - John Dickinson, British inventor (d. 1869)
  - Stephen Reay, Scottish priest, orientalist (d. 1861)
- March 31
  - Jesse Ketchum, Canadian politician (d. 1867)
  - Louis-Hippolyte Lebas, French architect (d. 1867)
  - Samuel Prentiss, United States federal judge (d. 1857)

=== April ===
- April 1
  - James Daly, 1st Baron Dunsandle and Clanconal, British politician (d. 1847)
  - George C. Sibley, American explorer and politician (d. 1863)
- April 2 – Johannes West, Inspector of Greenland (d. 1835)
- April 3
  - Daniel Garrison, American politician (d. 1851)
  - William Lyttelton, 3rd Baron Lyttelton, English Whig politician (d. 1837)
  - Alexander Macomb, United States Army general (d. 1841)
- April 4
  - Vincenzo Flauti, Italian mathematician (d. 1863)
  - George Rowley, British academic (d. 1836)
- April 5
  - James R. Manley, American physician (d. 1851)
  - Edward West, British economist and judge in India (d. 1828)
- April 7 – Marie-Anne Libert, Belgian botanist and mycologist (d. 1865)
- April 9 – Joseph Hunter Bryan, American politician (d. 1839)
- April 10 – María Antonia Santos Plata, Neogranadine rebel leader & heroine (d. 1819)
- April 11 – Abraham Abell, Irish antiquarian (d. 1851)
- April 14 – Carlo Coccia, Italian composer (d. 1873)
- April 15 – Eleazer W. Ripley, American politician (d. 1839)
- April 16
  - William Jerdan, Scottish journalist (d. 1869)
  - Toribio de Luzuriaga, Argentinian military personnel (d. 1842)
- April 17
  - Joseph Carne, British geologist and industrialist (d. 1858)
  - Frederick Lamb, 3rd Viscount Melbourne, British diplomat (d. 1853)
- April 18 – Georg August Goldfuss, German paleontologist, mineralogist, zoologist and botanist (d. 1848)
- April 21
  - Friedrich Fröbel, German pedagogue (d. 1852)
  - Samuel Hibbert-Ware, British geologist and antiquarian (d. 1848)
- April 23 – Prince Teimuraz of Georgia, Georgian royal prince and scholar (d. 1846)
- April 25 – Adriano Balbi, Italian geographer (d. 1848)
- April 26 – Maria Amalia of Naples and Sicily, Queen of France (d. 1866)
- April 27 – Jeptha Vining Harris, Georgia militia Brigadier General (d. 1856)
- April 28 – William Darlington, American physician, botanist, politician (d. 1863)
- April 29 – James Fowle Baldwin, American engineer (d. 1862)

=== May ===
- May 1 – Yevgeny Golovin, Russian general (d. 1858)
- May 4
  - James Bathurst, British Army officer (d. 1850)
  - Friedrich Philipp Ritterich, German ophthalmologist (d. 1866)
  - John R. Williams, American politician (d. 1854)
- May 5 – Edward Richard Stewart, British politician (d. 1851)
- May 6
  - Charles-René Laitié, French sculptor (d. 1862)
  - Edward Charles Whinyates, English army officer (d. 1865)
- May 8 – Ivan Paskevich, military leader of Ukrainian descent (d. 1856)
- May 9
  - Virgil Horace Barber, American Jesuit (d. 1847)
  - Marcia Van Ness, founded Washington Orphan Asylum in 1815 (d. 1832)
- May 10 – Louis-René Villermé, French economist (d. 1863)
- May 12 – Lippmann Moses Büschenthal, German poet (d. 1818)
- May 13
  - Henry A. P. Muhlenberg, American politician (d. 1844)
  - Johan Gustaf Sandberg, Swedish artist (d. 1854)
  - Ferdinand de Bertier de Sauvigny, French politician (d. 1864)
- May 14
  - John McElroy, Jesuit Priest (d. 1877)
  - Antoine-Marie Roederer, French politician (d. 1865)
- May 16 – John Sell Cotman, British artist (d. 1842)
- May 18
  - John Ferneley, English painter (d. 1860)
  - Ludwig Adolf Wilhelm von Lützow, Prussian lieutenant-general (d. 1834)
  - Valerian Madatov, Russian general (d. 1829)
  - Gilbert C. Russell, American military officer (d. 1861)
- May 19
  - Rowland Stephenson, British politician (d. 1856)
  - Mikhail Semyonovich Vorontsov, Russian prince and Field Marshal (d. 1856)
- May 22 – Hirose Tansō, Japanese poet and writer (d. 1856)
- May 23
  - Christopher Crackenthorp Askew, British Royal Navy officer, captain in 1822 (d. 1848)
  - Charles Fothergill, Canadian politician (d. 1840)
- May 26
  - Medora Gordon Byron, British Romantic novelist (d. 1858)
  - Joseph Drechsler, Czech conductor, music educator, composer and organist (d. 1852)
  - Erasmo Seguín, head postmaster of San Antonio, Texas (d. 1857)
  - George Small, Scottish piano manufacturer (d. 1861)
  - Sir George Strickland, 7th Baronet, British politician (d. 1874)
- May 27 – Antoni Jan Ostrowski, Polish general (d. 1845)
- May 28
  - Sir Charles Mansfield Clarke, 1st Baronet, British surgeon (d. 1857)
  - Johann Rombauer, painter from Hungary (d. 1849)
  - Wouter Johannes van Troostwijk, painter from the Northern Netherlands, 1782–1810 (d. 1810)
- May 29 – James Murray, 1st Baron Glenlyon, British Army general (d. 1837)
- May 30 – John Spencer, 3rd Earl Spencer, British politician (d. 1845)
- May 31 – Thomas Courtenay, British politician (d. 1841)

=== June ===
- June 1
  - Lord William FitzRoy, British Member of Parliament (d. 1857)
  - Thomas Van Horne, US politician and Ohio State Senator (d. 1841)
  - Konstantin Poltoratsky, lieutenant general of the Imperial Russian Army (d. 1858)
  - Ferdinand von Tiesenhausen, Russian noble and military commander (d. 1805)
- June 3 – Charles Waterton, English naturalist, explorer and conservationist (d. 1865)
- June 4
  - Frédéric Théodore Faber, Belgian painter (d. 1844)
  - Christian Martin Frähn, German and Russian numismatist and historian (d. 1851)
- June 5
  - Lemuel Williams Jr., American lawyer and politician (d. 1869)
  - Ulrik Frederik Anton de Schouboe, Norwegian civil servant and politician (d. 1863)
- June 6 – Vicenta Moguel, Basque writer and translator (d. 1854)
- June 7 – Rowland Alston, English politician (d. 1865)
- June 8 – Seaton Grantland, American politician (d. 1864)
- June 9
  - Peter Fisher, Canadian historian (d. 1848)
  - Alexander Powell, British Tory politician and MP (d. 1847)
- June 10
  - Amable Guillaume Prosper Brugière, baron de Barante, French historian and statesman (d. 1866)
  - Ole Christian Andersen Nøstvig, Norwegian politician (d. 1852)
- June 11 – Richard Hill, Church of England clergyman in New South Wales (d. 1836)
- June 12
  - Pyotr Kotlyarevsky, Russian general (d. 1851)
  - Peter Schmidt, Norwegian politician and businessman (d. 1845)
- June 13
  - Marie-Anne-Julie Forestier, French painter (d. 1853)
  - William Bullein Johnson, American Baptist minister (d. 1862)
- June 14 – Anton Aloys Wolf, Prince-Bishop of Laibach (Ljubljana) (d. 1859)
- June 15 – Alexander George Woodford, British Army officer (d. 1870)
- June 16
  - Nehemiah Eastman, American congressman for New Hampshire (d. 1856)
  - Olry Terquem, French mathematician (d. 1862)
- June 17 – Joseph Slater Jr., British portrait painter and draughtsman (d. 1837)
- June 18
  - George Rodney, 3rd Baron Rodney, British Baron (d. 1842)
  - Marceli Tarczewski, Polish lawyer (d. 1843)
- June 19 – Félicité de La Mennais, French priest, philosopher and political theorist (d. 1854)
- June 20 – Charles Floyd, American explorer (d. 1804)
- June 21 – Princess Maria Augusta of Saxony (d. 1863)
- June 24
  - Sir William Heygate, 1st Baronet, British MP (d. 1844)
  - Juan Larrea, Argentine politician (d. 1847)
  - Harmanus Peek, American politician (d. 1838)
- June 25 – William O'Brien, Canadian political figure in Nova Scotia (d. 1851)
- June 26
  - Fortunée Briquet, French woman of letters (d. 1815)
  - Juan José Pedro Carrera, Chilean politician (d. 1818)
  - Peter Paul Dobrée, British classical scholar (d. 1825)
- June 29
  - Hans Christian Lyngbye, Danish priest and botanist (d. 1837)
  - William Stockbridge, American businessman (d. 1850)
- June 30 – William Cathcart, Scottish naval officer (d. 1804)

=== July ===
- July 1 – Pieter Hendrik van Zuylen van Nijevelt, Dutch and French army general (d. 1825)
- July 2 – Adrien de Rougé, French statesman, soldier (d. 1838)
- July 3 – Pierre Berthier, French geologist (d. 1861)
- July 4 – Adèle Duchâtel, French court official (d. 1860)
- July 5
  - Mads Lauritz Madsen, Norwegian politician (d. 1840)
  - Arabella Menage, British actress and dancer (d. 1817)
  - Rosa Morandi, Italian soprano (d. 1824)
- July 6
  - Luis Brión, Venezuelan military officer (d. 1821)
  - Henri Antoine Jacques, French botanist (d. 1866)
  - Maria Luisa, Duchess of Lucca, Spanish Royal (d. 1824)
- July 7
  - John Myers Felder, American politician (d. 1851)
  - Thomas Wilde, 1st Baron Truro, British lawyer, judge and politician (d. 1858)
- July 9
  - Tomaso Catullo, Italian noblemen, geologist, paleontologist and zoologist (d. 1869)
  - Lancelot-Théodore Turpin de Crissé, French painter and writer (d. 1859)
- July 10 – Moses Elias Levy, Jewish-American businessman and reformer (d. 1854)
- July 12 – Étienne Marc Quatremère, French orientalist (d. 1857)
- July 13
  - Thomas William Taylor, British Army officer (d. 1854)
  - Charlotte White, American missionary (d. 1863)
- July 14
  - Archduke Maximilian of Austria-Este, Austrian archduke (d. 1863)
  - Jesse Elliott, United States Navy officer (d. 1845)
- July 16
  - Sophie Ørsted, Danish muse (d. 1818)
  - Joachim Heinrich Wilhelm Wagener, German banker and patron of the arts (d. 1861)
- July 17 – James Cockle, British surgeon (d. 1854)
- July 18 – Mariano Enrique Calvo, president and vice president of Bolivia (d. 1842)
- July 19
  - Jonathan Blewitt, English composer (d. 1853)
  - Charles Gardiner, 1st Earl of Blessington, Irish Earl (d. 1829)
  - Iinuma Yokusai, Japanese botanist and physician (d. 1865)
- July 23 – Johann Heinrich Rosenplänter, Baltic German parish priest and linguist (d. 1846)
- July 24
  - John Fox Burgoyne, British Army officer (d. 1871)
  - William Temple Thomson Mason, American businessman (d. 1862)
- July 25
  - Mariano Boedo, Argentine politician (d. 1819)
  - Lincoln Goodale, American doctor (d. 1868)
  - Michael Rohde, German botanist (d. 1812)
  - Sir David Scott, 2nd Baronet, Member of the United Kingdom Parliament (d. 1851)
- July 26 – John Field, Irish pianist, composer and teacher (d. 1837)
- July 27 – Basilio Puoti, Italian lexicographer and literary critic (d. 1847)
- July 28
  - Aristaces Azaria, Armenian Catholic abbot and archbishop (d. 1855)
  - Thomas Burnside, American politician (d. 1851)
- July 29
  - François Liénard de la Mivoye, French zoologist and botanist (d. 1862)
  - Jesse Wharton, American politician (d. 1833)
- July 31 – Oliver H. Prince, American politician (d. 1837)

=== August ===
- August 1
  - Johann Casimir Benicken, German jurist and judge (d. 1838)
  - Eugène de Mazenod, French bishop and saint (d. 1861)
- August 2 – Johannes van Hooydonk, Dutch Roman Catholic clergyman and bishop (d. 1868)
- August 4 – John Kerr, member of the US House of Representatives (d. 1842)
- August 6 – William Spencer, American judge and politician (d. 1871)
- August 10
  - Vicente Guerrero, 2nd President of Mexico (d. 1831)
  - Matsudaira Muneakira, Japanese daimyo (d. 1840)
  - Charles James Napier, Governor of Sindh, Commander-in-Chief in British India (d. 1853)
- August 12 – Ole Johansen Winstrup, Danish engineer and inventor (d. 1867)
- August 13 – Conrad Ten Eyck, American politician (d. 1847)
- August 15
  - Carlo Brioschi, Italian astronomer (d. 1833)
  - James Smith of Jordanhill, Scottish merchant, geologist and biblical critic (d. 1867)
  - Charles Lowell, United States Unitarian minister (d. 1861)
  - Henri de Merode, member of the Belgian Senate and writer (d. 1847)
  - Faustin Soulouque, President and emperor of Haiti (d. 1867)
- August 16 – Elderkin Potter, American politician and lawyer (d. 1845)
- August 17
  - Pierre-Luc-Charles Cicéri, French stage designer (d. 1868)
  - Pavel Martynov, Russian Lieutenant General (d. 1838)
- August 18
  - Jean-Louis Boisselot, French composer and piano manufacturer (d. 1847)
  - Marcellin Marbot, French general (d. 1854)
- August 20
  - Nicolas-Philibert Adelon, French physician (d. 1862)
  - Charles Fraser, American painter (d. 1860)
  - Juliana de Almeida e Oyenhausen, Russian noble (d. 1864)
- August 23 – David Hudson, American politician (d. 1860)
- August 25
  - Charles Comte, French lawyer, journalist and political writer (d. 1837)
  - Joseph Heinrich Gügler, Swiss theologian (d. 1827)
  - Prince Carl Gustav, Duke of Småland, Swedish prince (d. 1783)
  - Sylvester Pattie, American frontiersman (d. 1828)
- August 28
  - Antoine Maurice Apollinaire d'Argout, French politician (d. 1858)
  - John Wray, barrister and the first Receiver of the London Metropolitan Police (d. 1869)
- August 29
  - John Bowman, American lawyer, banker and politician from New York (d. 1853)
  - Louis Antoine François de Marchangy, French advocate general, poet and politician (d. 1826)
  - John Augustine Smith, President of the College of William & Mary (d. 1865)
- August 30 – Christian of the Palatinate-Zweibrücken, Bavarian general (d. 1859)
- August 31
  - Joseph H. Crane, American politician (d. 1851)
  - Edward Russell, American politician (d. 1835)

=== September ===
- September 1
  - Frances Alsop, English actor (d. 1816)
  - Thomas Reade, English army officer and consul in Tunis (d. 1849)
- September 2 – Myndert Van Schaick, American politician (d. 1865)
- September 3
  - Benedict Joseph Fenwick, American Catholic bishop (d. 1846)
  - Christian Ludwig Nitzsch, German zoologist and botanist (d. 1837)
- September 5
  - Charles Malcolm, British Royal Navy officer (d. 1851)
  - Maeda Narinaga, Japanese samurai and daimyo (d. 1824)
- September 6 – Doxachi Hurmuzachi, ethnic Romanian boyar from the Duchy of Bukovina (d. 1857)
- September 7
  - Princess Marie of Baden, Duchess of Brunswick-Wolfenbüttel & Brunswick-Oels (d. 1808)
  - Clark Bissell, American judge and politician (d. 1857)
  - Susan Edmonstone Ferrier, Scottish novelist (d. 1854)
  - Crown Prince Munhyo, Crown prince of the Kingdom of Korea (d. 1786)
- September 8
  - Johan Gørbitz, Norwegian painter (d. 1853)
  - Mariano Montilla, Venezuelan politician (d. 1851)
- September 9
  - Andreas Andersen Feldborg, Danish writer (d. 1838)
  - Charles-François Painchaud, Quebec priest (d. 1838)
- September 10 – John Ketcham, American politician (d. 1865)
- September 11
  - Fisher A. Blocksom, American politician and lawyer from Ohio (d. 1876)
  - Daniel Gaskell, British politician (d. 1875)
- September 13 – William Wood, Scottish surgeon (d. 1858)
- September 14 – Christian Magnus Falsen, jurist, father of the Constitution of Norway and member of Stortinget (d. 1830)
- September 16
  - Daoguang Emperor, Qing-dynasty Chinese emperor (d. 1850)
  - Hans Nilsen Gubberud, Norwegian politician (d. 1835)
- September 17 – Christoph Hawich, German lithographer and painter (d. 1848)
- September 18 – José Tomás Boves, Spanish general (d. 1815)
- September 19
  - Karl von Fischer, German architect (d. 1820)
  - Vicente Genaro de Quesada, Spanish general (d. 1836)
  - Robert Sale, British Army general (d. 1845)
  - John Wroe, British evangelist (d. 1863)
- September 20
  - Richard Dunning, 2nd Baron Ashburton, British noble (d. 1823)
  - Edward John Eliot, English cavalry officer (d. 1863)
- September 22
  - Pierre-Dominique Debartzch, Canadian politician (d. 1846)
  - Fredric Westin, Swedish painter (d. 1862)
- September 23
  - Jacques Féréol Mazas, French musician (d. 1849)
  - Prince Maximilian of Wied-Neuwied, German explorer, ethnologist and naturalist (d. 1867)
- September 24 – William Symonds, British Royal Navy admiral (d. 1856)
- September 25
  - Charles Maturin, Irish writer (d. 1824)
  - Stephen Price, theatre manager from New York City (d. 1840)
- September 27 – Thomas M. Nelson, American politician (d. 1853)
- September 28 – George Smith, English architect and surveyor (d. 1869)
- September 29 – Windham Quin, 2nd Earl of Dunraven and Mount-Earl, British politician (d. 1850)

=== October ===
- October 3
  - Charles Jared Ingersoll, American politician and writer (d. 1862)
  - David Johnson, Governor of South Carolina (d. 1855)
  - Richard Peek, English philanthropist (d. 1867)
- October 4 – James Wadmore, English art collector (d. 1853)
- October 6
  - Isidro Barrada, Spanish military personnel (d. 1835)
  - James Gordon, British Royal Navy officer (d. 1869)
- October 7
  - John Duer, American jurist (d. 1852)
  - Charles Maclaren, Scottish journalist and geologist (d. 1866)
  - James Lucas Yeo, British naval commander (d. 1818)
- October 8 – Robert Lucas Chance, British glass maker (d. 1865)
- October 9
  - Lewis Cass, American military officer, politician, statesman (d. 1866)
  - Tilly Lynde, American politician (d. 1857)
  - William Holland Wilmer, American episcopal priest (d. 1827)
- October 11
  - Steen Steensen Blicher, Danish writer (d. 1848)
  - Christian Heinrich Bünger, German anatomist and surgeon (d. 1842)
  - Georg Andreas von Rosen, Russian army general (d. 1841)
  - Pierre-Antoine Tabeau, Canadian missionary (d. 1835)
- October 12
  - Henry Dodge, American politician and general (d. 1867)
  - Jared Groce, American planter, slaveowner and settler (d. 1836)
- October 13 – Joseph Nigg, Austrian artist (d. 1863)
- October 14 – James Gilmour, Canadian businessman (d. 1858)
- October 15 – James Elmes, English writer and architect (d. 1862)
- October 16
  - Alois Pichl, Austrian architect (d. 1856)
  - Hamelin Trelawny, British politician (d. 1856)
- October 18
  - Joseph M. Street, Iowa pioneer, trader and US Indian Agent (d. 1840)
  - Karl Friedrich Eusebius Trahndorff, German philosopher (d. 1863)
- October 19 – J. T. Wedgwood, British engraver (d. 1856)
- October 20 – Christian Blom, Norwegian composer (d. 1861)
- October 24 – William Norton Shinn, American politician (d. 1871)
- October 25
  - Iosif Ivanovich Charlemagne, Russian architect (d. 1861)
  - Levi Lincoln Jr., Massachusetts Governor and Congressman (d. 1868)
  - Sir William Verner, 1st Baronet, British politician (d. 1871)
- October 26
  - Carlo Tancredi Falletti di Barolo, Italian politician and mayor (d. 1838)
  - Charles Goodall, English cricketer (d. 1872)
- October 27 – Niccolò Paganini, Italian violinist and composer (d. 1840)
- October 28 – Henry Meigs, American politician (d. 1861)
- October 30 – Lorenzo Maria of Saint Francis Xavier, Italian saint (d. 1856)

=== November ===
- November 1
  - Joseph von Blumenthal, Austrian musician (d. 1850)
  - F. J. Robinson, 1st Viscount Goderich, Prime Minister of the United Kingdom (d. 1859)
  - Adam Ditlev Wedell-Wedellsborg, Dano-Norwegian government official (d. 1827)
- November 2 – Eustoquio Díaz Vélez, Spanish-Argentine general (d. 1856)
- November 3 – Lewis Warrington, United States Secretary of the Navy (d. 1851)
- November 4
  - John Branch, American politician (d. 1863)
  - Nanbu Toshitaka, Japanese samurai, 10th daimyō of Morioka Domain, northern Japan (d. 1820)
- November 6 – Maha Bandula, Burmese general (d. 1825)
- November 7
  - Friedrich Karl Gustav, Baron von Langenau, Austrian field marshal (d. 1840)
  - Edward Hawker, Royal Navy officer during the French Revolutionary Wars and Napoleonic Wars (d. 1860)
  - John Pye, English landscape engraver (d. 1874)
- November 11
  - Francis Blackburne, Lord Chancellor of Ireland (d. 1867)
  - Nathan Dunn, American collector (d. 1844)
  - Elihu Embree, American abolitionist and newspaper editor (d. 1820)
- November 12
  - William Hendricks, American politician (d. 1850)
  - Granville Proby, 3rd Earl of Carysfort, British naval commander and Whig politician (d. 1868)
  - James Wedderburn, Solicitor General for Scotland (d. 1822)
- November 13
  - Sir Alexander Grant, 8th Baronet, British politician (d. 1854)
  - Joseph Kornhäusel, Austrian architect (d. 1860)
  - Esaias Tegnér, Swedish poet, professor and bishop (d. 1846)
- November 16
  - Gilbert Elliot-Murray-Kynynmound, 2nd Earl of Minto, British politician (d. 1859)
  - Thomas Whitmore, English politician (d. 1846)
- November 17 – Conrad Graf, German piano maker (d. 1851)
- November 19 – John McCarty, American politician (d. 1851)
- November 20
  - Alexander Macdonell of Greenfield, Canadian politician and businessman (d. 1835)
  - Georgius Jacobus Johannes van Os, painter from the Northern Netherlands (d. 1861)
- November 21 – William Tippet, Anglo-Indian Judge and Magistrate (d. 1824)
- November 22
  - Richard Bagot, Bishop of Oxford, Dean of Canterbury (d. 1854)
  - Sophie Swetchine, Russian salon-holder (d. 1857)
- November 25
  - George Tillson, American industrialist (d. 1864)
  - Thomas Contee Worthington, American politician (d. 1847)
- November 26
  - Karl Johann Bernhard Karsten, German mineralogist (d. 1853)
  - Johan Christopher Ræder, Norwegian politician (d. 1853)
- November 28 – John R. Drake, American politician (d. 1857)
- November 29 – Henry Walton Ellis, British Army officer (d. 1815)
- November 30 – Giuseppe Moretti, Italian botanist (d. 1853)

=== December ===
- December 2 – Gerard Thomas Noel, British cleric (d. 1851)
- December 3
  - John E. Coffee, American politician (d. 1836)
  - Henry William Pickersgill, British artist (d. 1875)
- December 5
  - Martin Van Buren, 8th president of the United States (d. 1862)
  - Sir George Warrender, 4th Baronet, British politician (d. 1849)
- December 7
  - James Earickson, American politician (d. 1844)
  - Nicolaus Michael Oppel, German naturalist (d. 1820)
  - Joseph Trumbull, American politician and lawyer (d. 1861)
- December 9 – Waleria Tarnowska, Polish painter and art collector (d. 1849)
- December 10
  - Thomas William Brotherton, British general (d. 1868)
  - Charles Nicolas Fabvier, French military personnel, politician and diplomat (d. 1855)
  - Friedrich Konrad Griepenkerl, German philosopher, educationist, musicologist and musician (d. 1849)
- December 11
  - George Barnes, English archdeacon (d. 1847)
  - Johann Friedrich Müller, German copperplate engraver (d. 1816)
- December 12 – Marie-Victoire Baudry, Canadian superior general (d. 1846)
- December 13 – John Clitherow, British Army general (d. 1852)
- December 16
  - Hans Jakob Oeri, Swiss painter (d. 1868)
  - Louis-Barthélémy Pradher, French composer, pianist and music educator (d. 1843)
  - Diego Bautista Urbaneja, Venezuelan politician (d. 1856)
- December 17 – James Fullarton, Scottish soldier who fought in the Kandyan Wars (d. 1834)
- December 19 – Julius Vincenz von Krombholz, Czech botanist, surgeon, doctor and mycologist (d. 1843)
- December 21
  - Benoit Tranquille Berbiguier, French composer (d. 1838)
  - Randolph Isham Routh, British commissariat officer (d. 1858)
- December 22 – Jean Bélanger, Canadian politician (d. 1827)
- December 23
  - William Armstrong, American lawyer, civil servant, politician, businessperson (d. 1865)
  - Johann Anton Weinmann, German botanist (d. 1858)
- December 24
  - Therese Brunetti, Austrian actress (d. 1864)
  - Charles Hubert Millevoye, poet from France (d. 1816)
- December 25
  - Victory Birdseye, American politician (d. 1853)
  - Nathaniel Fish Moore, American university administrator (d. 1872)
- December 26 – Philaret Drozdov, Russian bishop (d. 1867)
- December 27
  - Samuel Hood, Anglican Dean of Argyll and The Isles (d. 1872)
  - Henry Vail, American politician (d. 1853)
- December 28
  - Joseph Arnold, English naval surgeon and naturalist (d. 1818)
  - Matthias Joseph de Noël, German writer and art collector (d. 1849)
  - Cajetan von Textor, German physician (d. 1860)
- December 29
  - François-Joseph Grille, French librarian (d. 1853)
  - William Lloyd, British army officer (d. 1857)
  - Benjamin Woodworth, American politician (d. 1874)
- December 30
  - John Freeman Milward Dovaston, British poet and naturalist (d. 1854)
  - Jonas Anton Hielm, Norwegian politician (d. 1848)
- December 31
  - Konstantin Bulgakov, Russian diplomat and postal director (d. 1835)
  - Jean-Pierre Sylvestre de Grateloup, French naturalist (d. 1861)

== Deaths ==
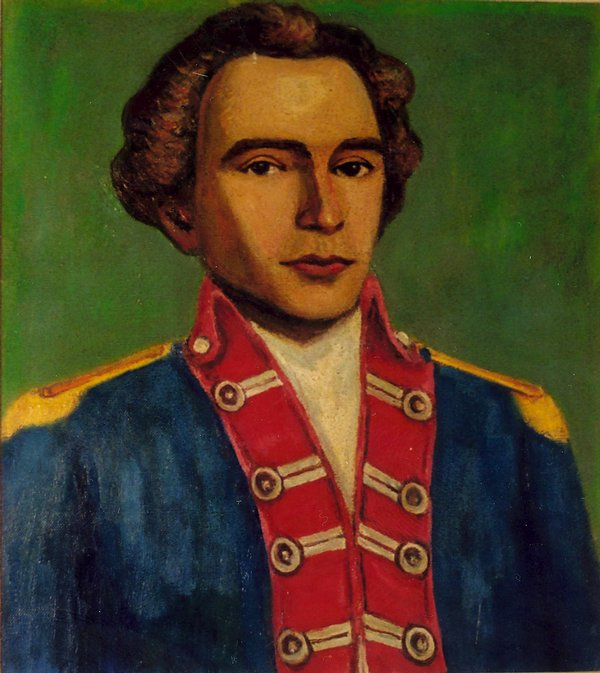
William Crawford

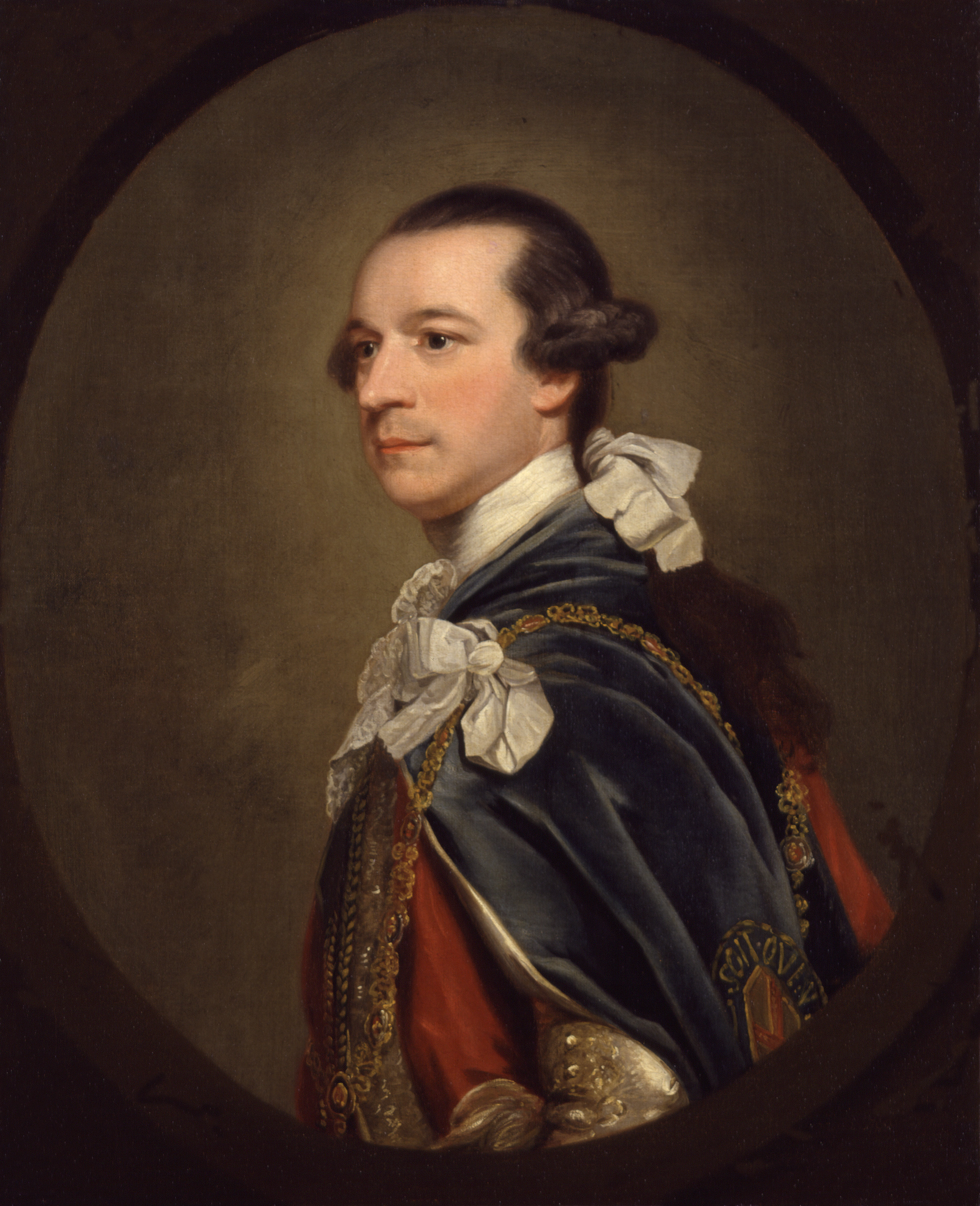
Charles Watson-Wentworth, 2nd Marquess of Rockingham

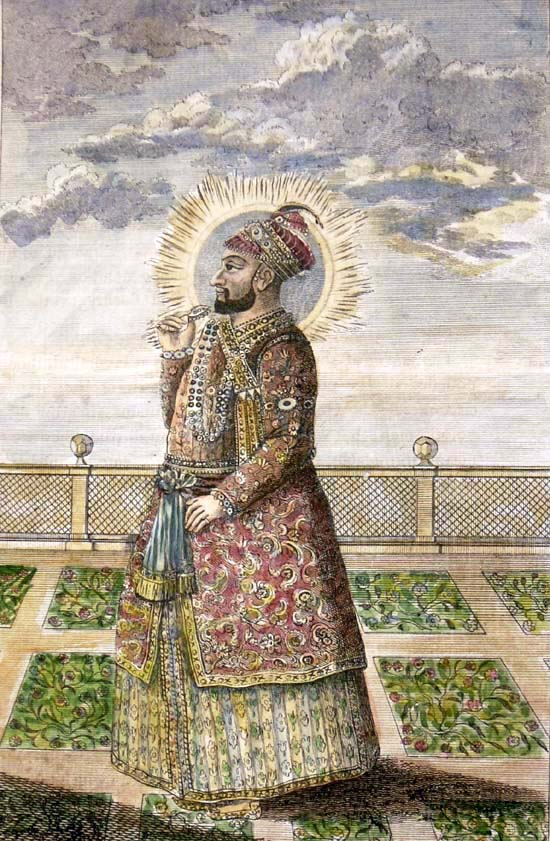
Hyder Ali

- January 2 – Johann Christian Bach, German composer (b. 1735)
- January 4 – Ange-Jacques Gabriel, French architect (b. 1698)
- January 18 – John Pringle, Scottish physician (b. 1707)
- January 28 — Jean-Baptiste Bourguignon d'Anville, French geographer and cartographer (b. 1697)
- January 30 – Vasily Dolgorukov-Krymsky, Russian general (b. 1722)
- February 9 – Giuseppe Luigi Assemani, Syrian orientalist (b. 1710)
- February 10 – Friedrich Christoph Oetinger, German theologian (b. 1702)
- March 1 – John A. Treutlen, Governor of Georgia (b. 1734)
- March 2 – Sophie of France, French princess (b.1734)
- March 9 – Sava II Petrović-Njegoš, Metropolitan of Cetinje (b. 1702)
- March 17 – Daniel Bernoulli, Dutch-born mathematical physicist (b. 1700)
- April 7 – Taksin the Great, King of Siam (Thonburi Kingdom) (b. 1734)
- April 13 – Metastasio, Italian poet, librettist (b. 1698)
- April 17 – Baal Shem of London, British Kabbalist (b. 1708)
- April 22 – Josef Seger, Czech composer and organist (b. 1716)
- April 28 – William Talbot, 1st Earl Talbot, English politician (b. 1710)
- May 8 – Sebastião José de Carvalho e Melo, 1st Marquis of Pombal, Portuguese statesman (b. 1699)
- May 15 – Richard Wilson, British painter (b. 1714)
- May 16 – Daniel Solander, Swedish botanist (b. 1736)
- May 20 – William Emerson, English mathematician (b. 1701)
- May 20 – Axel Lagerbielke, Swedish admiral and statesman (b. 1703)
- May 22 – Princess Friederike of Hesse-Darmstadt (b. 1752)
- June 11 – William Crawford, American soldier and surveyor (burned at the stake by Native Americans) (b. 1732)
- June 18 – John Wood, the Younger, English architect (b. 1728)
- June 21 – Prince George William of Hesse-Darmstadt, German prince (b. 1722)
- July 1 – Charles Watson-Wentworth, 2nd Marquess of Rockingham, British statesman, 2-time Prime Minister of Great Britain (b. 1730)
- July 15 – Farinelli, Italian castrato (b. 1705)
- August 27 – John Laurens, American soldier (b. 1754)
- August 31 – George Croghan, American colonist (b. c. 1718)
- September 5 – Bartolina Sisa, Bolivian indigenous Aymara heroine, rebel leader (b. c. 1750)
- September 6
  - Gregoria Apaza, Bolivian indigenous leader (b. 1751)
  - Martha Jefferson, wife of Thomas Jefferson (b. 1748)
- September 14 – Nicholas Cooke, first Governor of Rhode Island (b. 1717)
- October 2 – Charles Lee, Continental Army general during the American War of Independence (b. 1732)
- November 5 – James Burrow, British scholar (b. 1701)
- November 21 – Jacques de Vaucanson, French inventor (b. 1709)
- December 7 – Hyder Ali, Indian general, Sultan of Mysore (b. 1720)
- December 11–William Beadle, Anglo-American merchant (b. 1730)
- December 16 – William Cole (antiquary), British antiquarian (b. 1714)
- December 27 – Henry Home, Lord Kames, Scottish advocate and philosopher (b. 1697)
- date unknown
  - Christine Kirch, German astronomer (b. 1696)
  - Sabina Aufenwerth, German potter (b. 1706)
  - Elisabeth Christina von Linné, Swedish botanist (b. 1743)
