= Carl von Hess =

German ophthalmologist (1863–1923)

Carl von Hess (7 March 1863, in Mainz – 28 June 1923, in Possenhofen) was a German ophthalmologist known for his work in ocular physiology.

He studied medicine at Heidelberg University, the University of Bonn, and the University of Strasbourg, then traveled to Prague, where he worked with ophthalmologist Hubert Sattler and physiologist Ewald Hering. In 1891, he obtained his habilitation from Leipzig University, and later on, he held professorships at Marburg University (from 1896), the University of Würzburg (from 1900), and the Ludwig-Maximilians-Universität München (from 1912).

He made significant contributions in his studies of refraction and accommodation of the eye. He also conducted research on color vision in the various retinal zones, on the various forms of color blindness, of simultaneous contrast, on afterimages of moving objects and of light-dark adaptation. In addition, he performed comparative physiological studies on light sense and color vision involving animals, in invertebrates as well as vertebrates. Along with Paul Römer, he made the discovery that trachoma is transmissible to monkeys. In 1912, he incorrectly claimed all invertebrates and fish were colour-blind. The young Karl von Frisch's experiments with bees showed the contrary, irritating von Hess who wrote a paper in 1913 (before von Frisch could publish), disputing both his conclusions and earlier ones of John Lubbock. Von Frisch's work later won the Nobel Prize. Von Hess did discover that bees' phototactical response was colour-blind.

His name is associated with the "Hess afterimage", defined as a positive afterimage that occurs third in the series of afterimages that are the result of exposure to a brief light stimulus (sequentially, the first afterimage is referred to as a "Hering afterimage", the second as a "Purkinje afterimage"). The Hess afterimage is defined as a physiological illusion. There are also several surgical instruments that are named after him.

== Published works ==
- Die Refraktion und Akkommodation des menschlichen Auges und ihre Anomalien, 1902 – Refraction and accommodation of the human eye and its anomalies.
- Pathologie und Therapie des Linsensystems, 1905 – Pathology and therapy of the lens system.
- Vergleichende Physiologie des Gesichtssinnes, 1912 – Comparative physiology of vision.
- Die Entwicklung von Lichtsinn und Farbensinn in der Tierreihe, 1914 – Development of light sense and color vision in the animal kingdom.

He was also an editor of later editions of Saemisch and Graefe's "Handbuch der gesamten Augenheilkunde".
