= Sattler =

Sattler (German (also Sättler): occupational name for a saddler) may refer to:

== People ==
- Barbara Sattler-Kovacevic (born 1948), Austrian retired slalom canoeist
- Barbara Sattler (philosopher) (born 1974), British philosopher
- Daryl Sattler (born 1980), American soccer player
- Ellie Sattler, fictional character in Jurassic Park
- Georg Sattler (1917–1944), German Luftwaffe pilot
- Helen Roney Sattler (1921–1992), American children's author
- Henri Sattler (born 1971), founder and vocalist/guitarist of God Dethroned
- Howard Sattler (1945–2021), Australian radio host
- Hubert Sattler (1844–1928), Austrian–German ophthalmologist
- Hubert Sattler (painter) (1817–1904), Austrian landscape painter
- Jerome Sattler (born 1931), American psychologist
- Johann Michael Sattler (1786–1847), Austrian portrait and landscape painter
- John Sattler (1942–2023), Australian rugby league footballer
- John F. Sattler (born 1949), United States Marine Corps lieutenant general
- Joseph Sattler (1867–1931), German Art Nouveau illustrator
- Mary Sattler (born 1973), American Democratic politician
- Michael Sattler (1490–1527), German Anabaptist monk and martyr
- Norbert Sattler (1951–2023), Austrian slalom canoeist
- Peggy Sattler (born c. 1962, Canadian New Democratic Party politician
- Rolf Sattler (born 1936), Canadian botanist and philosopher
- Scott Sattler (born 1971), Australian rugby league footballer
- Ulrike Sattler, German computer scientist
- Warren Sattler (born 1934), American cartoonist and illustrator

== Other ==
- 99201 Sattler, an asteroid named after Birgit I. Sattler
- Sattler Airfield, an abandoned airfield in Northern Territory, Australia
- Sattler's, a department store chain headquartered in Buffalo, New York
- Sattler's layer, a layer of blood vessels in the eye
