= Pagenstecher =

Pagenstecher may refer to:

== People ==
- Albrecht Pagenstecher (1839–1926), German-American pioneer of the modern paper industry
- Alexander Pagenstecher (ophthalmologist) (1828–1879), German ophthalmologist
- Arnold Pagenstecher (1837–1913), German physician and entomologist
- Alexander Pagenstecher (zoologist) (1825–1889), German naturalist
- Hermann Pagenstecher (1844–1932), German ophthalmologist
- Johan David Carel Pagenstecher, German-born acting commander of the Dutch Gold Coast
- Wolfgang Pagenstecher (1880–1953), German heraldist

== Animals ==
- Pagenstecher's crow (Euploea doretta), a butterfly described by Arnold Pagenstecher
