= Coccius =

Coccius is a surname. Notable people with the surname include:

- Ernst Adolf Coccius (1825–1890), German ophthalmologist
- Theodor Coccius (1824–1897), German pianist and pedagogue
