= Alexander Pagenstecher =

Alexander Pagenstecher may refer to:

- Alexander Pagenstecher (ophthalmologist)
- Alexander Pagenstecher (zoologist)
