= Sämisch =

Sämisch and its equivalent spelling Saemisch are surnames of German origin. People with those names include:

- Edwin Theodor Saemisch (1833–1909), German ophthalmologist
- Friedrich Sämisch (1896–1975), German chess grandmaster
  - King's Indian, Saemisch, 5...O-O
  - King's Indian Defence, Sämisch Variation
  - Nimzo-Indian, Saemisch variation
