= Doriprismatica tibboeli =

Scientific classification
- Kingdom: Animalia
- Phylum: Mollusca
- Class: Gastropoda
- Order: Nudibranchia
- Family: Chromodorididae
- Genus: Doriprismatica
- Species: D. tibboeli

Binomial name
- Doriprismatica tibboeli (Valdés & Adams, 2005)

Synonyms
- Glossodoris tibboeli Valdés & M.J. Adams, 2005 (basionym)

Species of gastropod

Doriprismatica tibboeli is a species of sea slug, a dorid nudibranch, a shell-less marine gastropod mollusk in the family Chromodorididae.

== Distribution ==
This species is found only in Sulawesi, Indonesia.

== Description ==
Doriprismatica tibboeli is similar in appearance to Doriprismatica atromarginata, but usually has a white, rather than yellow, body with no black line at the mantle edge.
