= Doriprismatica kulonba =

Scientific classification
- Kingdom: Animalia
- Phylum: Mollusca
- Class: Gastropoda
- Order: Nudibranchia
- Family: Chromodorididae
- Genus: Doriprismatica
- Species: D. kulonba

Binomial name
- Doriprismatica kulonba (Burn, 1966)

Synonyms
- Digidentis kulonba (Burn, 1966); Glossodoris kulonba (Burn, 1966); Hypselodoris kulonba Burn, 1966 (basionym)

Species of gastropod

Doriprismatica kulonba is a species of sea slug, a dorid nudibranch, a shell-less marine gastropod mollusk in the family Chromodorididae. This species was found to belong in a clade with Doriprismatica atromarginata in a molecular phylogeny study.

== Distribution ==
This species is known only from southeastern Australian, Victoria and Northern Tasmania.

== Description ==
Doriprismatica kulonba has a wide mantle overlap and very convoluted mantle margin. It is entirely white in colour apart from a thin band of milky yellow at the edge of the mantle and foot.
