= Hubert Sattler (painter) =

Austrian painter (1817–1904)

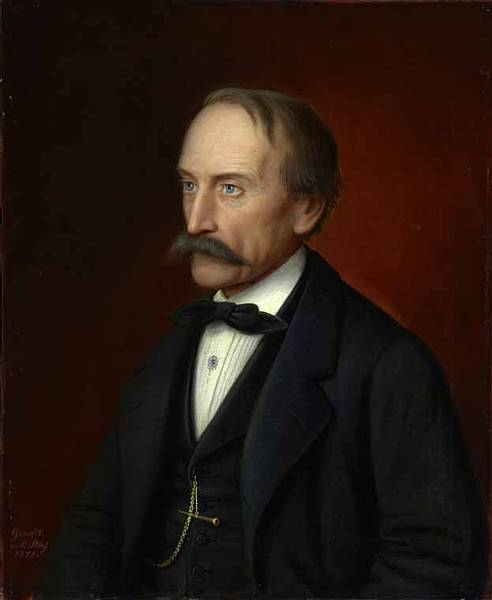
- Possible self-portrait
- Born: Hubert Sattler; 21 January 1817; Salzburg, Austria
- Died: 3 April 1904 (aged 87); Vienna, Austria
- Known for: Painting, Landscape art, Cosmoramas

Hubert Sattler (21 January 1817 – 3 April 1904) was an Austrian painter who also signed works with the pseudonyms Louis Ritschard, E. Grossen, and Gottfried Stähly-Rychen. He traveled widely and was noted for large and minutely detailed cosmorama paintings of cities, monuments, and landscapes of many countries.

== Education and career ==
Hubert Sattler was born in Salzburg. His father, Johann Michael Sattler (1787-1847), was a landscape painter who created the Sattler Panorama of Salzburg in 1825–29. His mother was Anna Maria Kittenberger, foster daughter of the painter Hubert Maurer.

As a boy, Sattler traveled with his father and first learned drawing and painting from him, then entered the Academy of Fine Arts in Vienna at the age of twelve. Following in his father's footsteps, he became a landscape painter and specialized in researching and painting large canvases for display in cosmoramas.

Cosmoramas were exhibitions of perspective paintings of various places, often world landmarks; careful use of illumination and lenses gave the images greater realism. Sattler's cosmorama works, characterized by a high degree of detail, were sometimes displayed under lights in a dark room to paying customers looking through an aperture and often a magnifying lens. While works in earlier cosmoramas were based on old engravings, Sattler's views were notably accurate and up to date; he went on research expeditions and then worked in his studio from his own detailed studies and from photographs. He traveled widely in Europe, the Near East, and Latin America, and painted both natural vistas and cities.

On her 1842 journey to the Near East, Ida Pfeiffer of Vienna met him and traveled with him for a while; in her published diary, she recorded how he was stoned by local people while sketching in Damascus.

He exhibited his cosmorama works in many countries, sometimes traveling with a specially-made portable building. These exhibitions were highly lucrative and also achieved critical success; Sattler was widely praised for his artistry and for his scholarship. In Hanover in 1848, the provincial court awarded Sattler the title of Professor.

== Sattler in America ==
While in Bremen to show his works, Sattler "met several Americans who urged him to take his exhibition to New York."

From 1850 to 1852 the northeastern United States was treated to a cosmoramic exhibition that surpassed in quality and variety the host of panoramic shows deluging the country at this time.…Hubert Sattler arrived in Manhattan with a collection of some one hundred cosmoramic views, which he exhibited in five series of twenty-six pictures each, in a small room at Thirteenth Street and Broadway.…The correspondent of The New York Tribune echoed many witnesses when he asserted that the cosmoramas rose "to the dignity of works of art" and were superior to any "book of travels, panorama, or engraving."…In a testimonial signed by the President of the National Academy of Design, Asher B. Durand, as well as by John F. Kensett and John Vanderlyn, Sattler was singled out as "a real artist, who understands perfectly how to find the best points of view for his paintings, and to execute them with rare skill and power."

When Sattler brought his cosmorama to Boston, views included "Lake Hallstadt in Austria, a sand storm in the Libyan Desert, Alexandria and a 'heavy storm on the Mediterranean.'" Patrons "enjoyed vicarious travel for twenty-five cents per adult, and only twelve and a half cents per child."

Sixteen of the paintings Sattler brought to America were destroyed by a fire in Philadelphia in January, 1852.

== Landscapes ==
In addition to the cosmorama works, Sattler also painted smaller, more traditional landscapes, sometimes signing then with his name or initials, or with a number of pseudonyms, including Louis Ritschard, E. Grossen, and Gottfried Stähly-Rychen. A favorite subject was the Tellskapelle (William Tell Chapel) on Lake Lucerne, which he painted numerous times, depicting it in various types of weather.

== Death and legacy ==
His son, also named Hubert Sattler (1844-1928), became a notable ophthalmologist.

In 1870, Sattler donated his father's Sattler Panorama of Salzburg to the city, along with more than 300 of his own works. The panorama is on permanent display in the Panorama Museum Salzburg inside the Salzburg Museum, together with a rotating exhibit drawn from over 130 Hubert Sattler cosmoramic paintings held by the museum.

In later life, Sattler spent many years in Vienna, where he died. He was buried in Salzburg in an Ehrengrab ("grave of honor") together with his father. The Hubert-Sattler-Gasse in the Neustadt area of Salzburg was named in his honor.

== Gallery: Hubert Sattler paintings in the Salzburg Museum ==
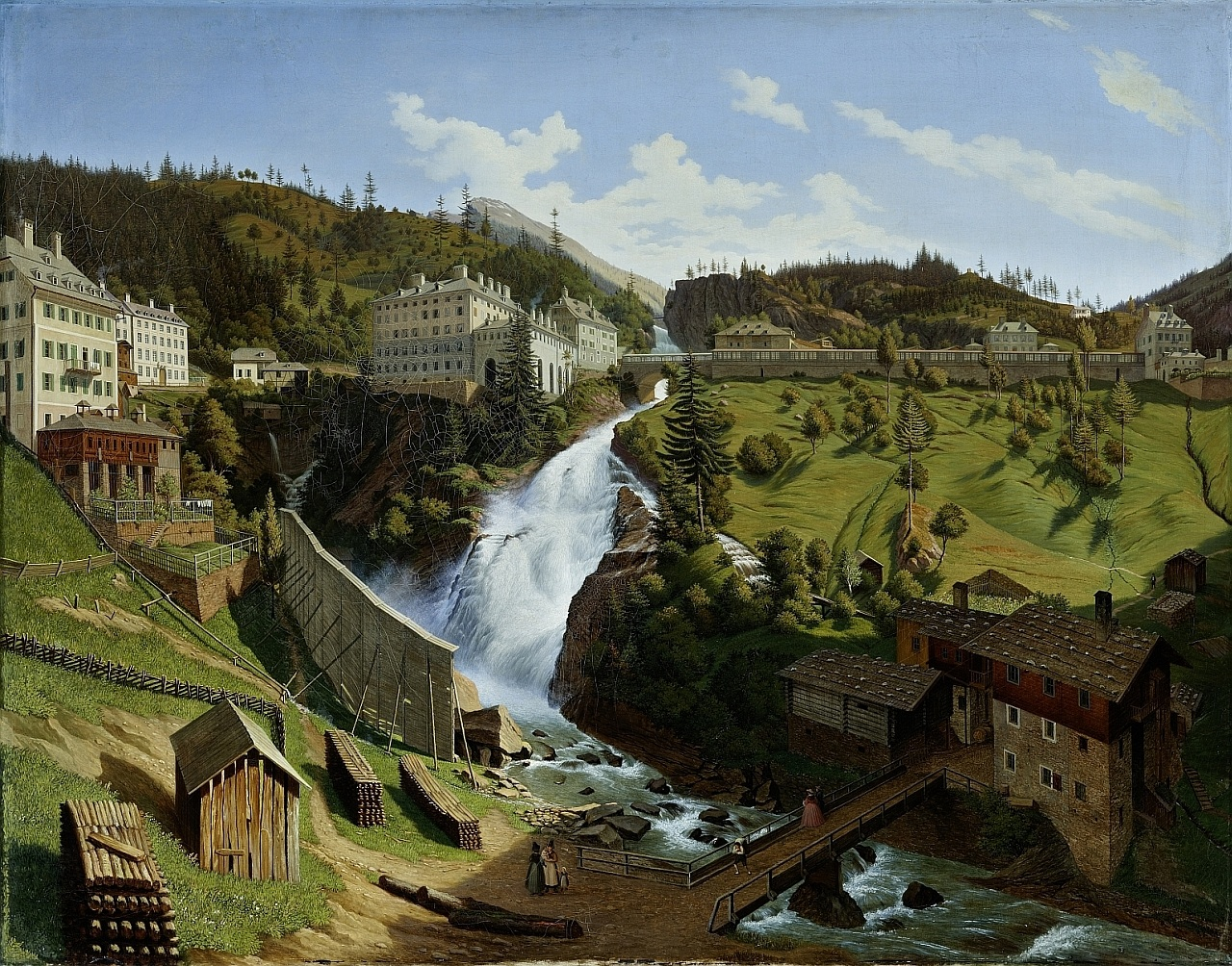
Bad Gastein, c. 1844

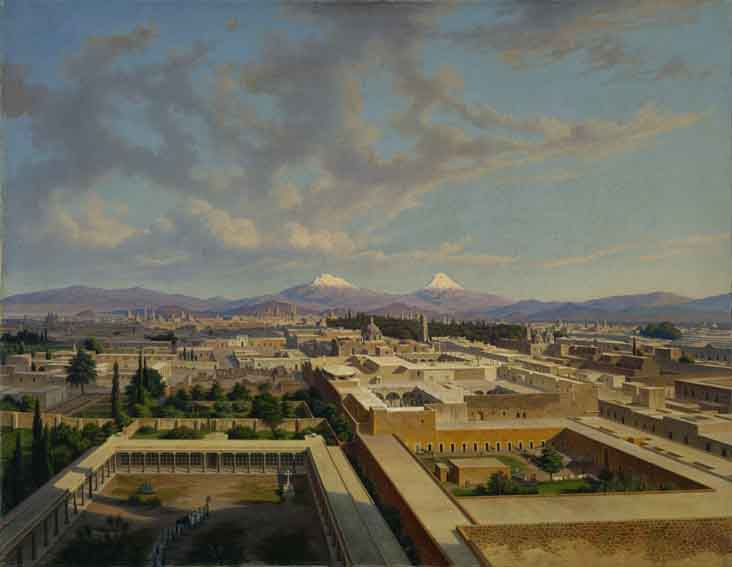
Mexico City, 1854

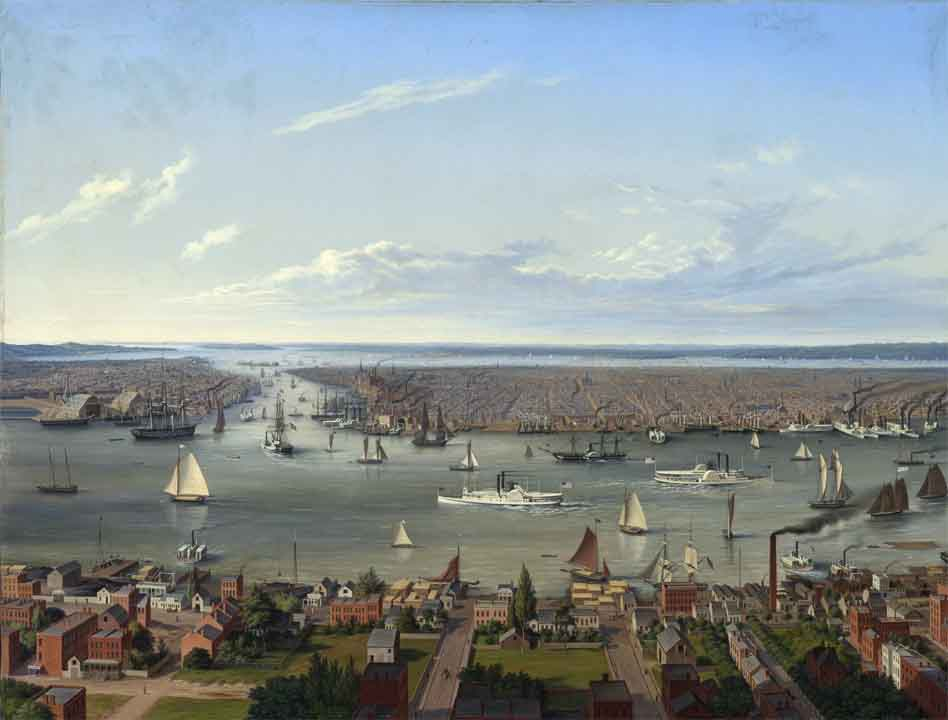
New York, 1854

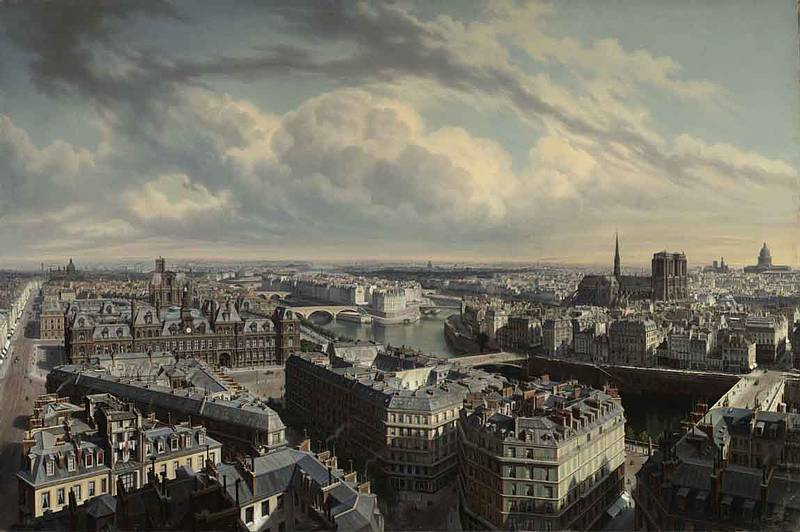
Paris, 1866

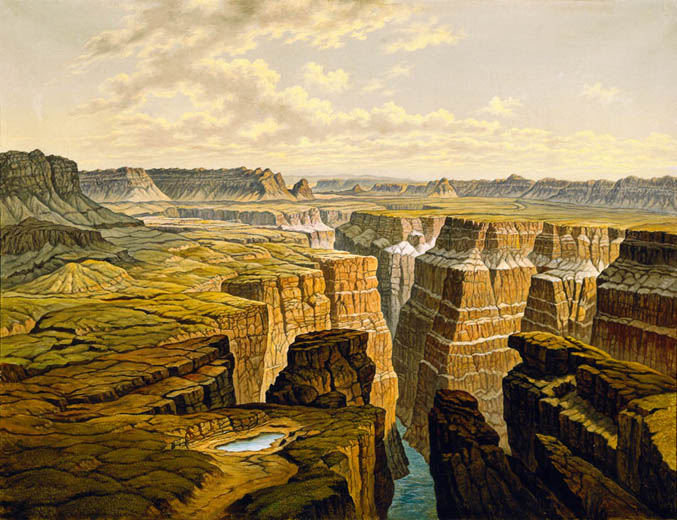
Grand Canyon, 1867

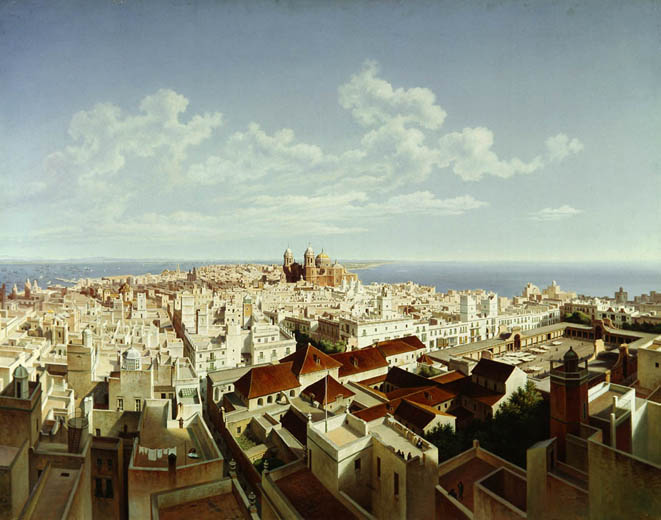
Cadiz, 1867

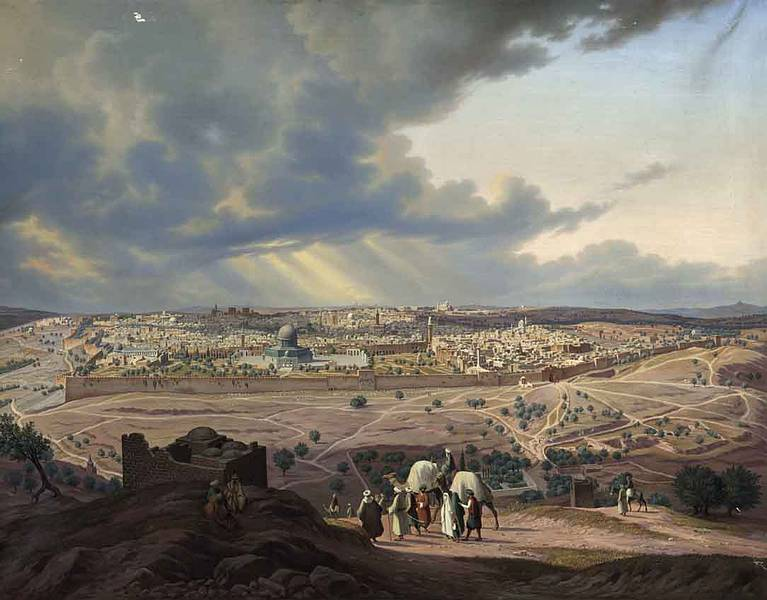
Jerusalem, 1869

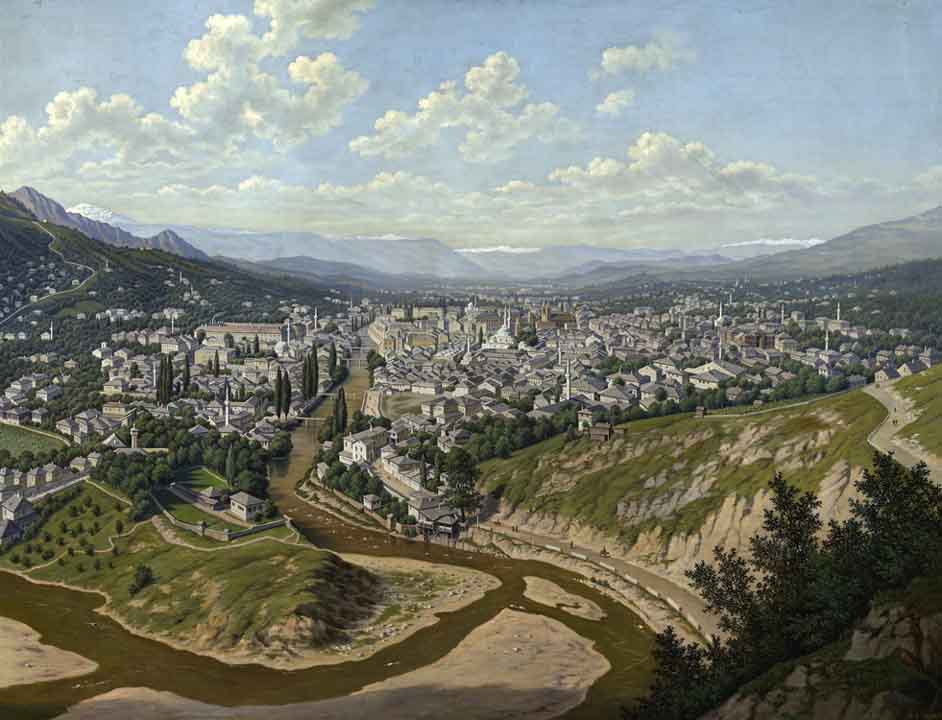
Sarajevo, 1893

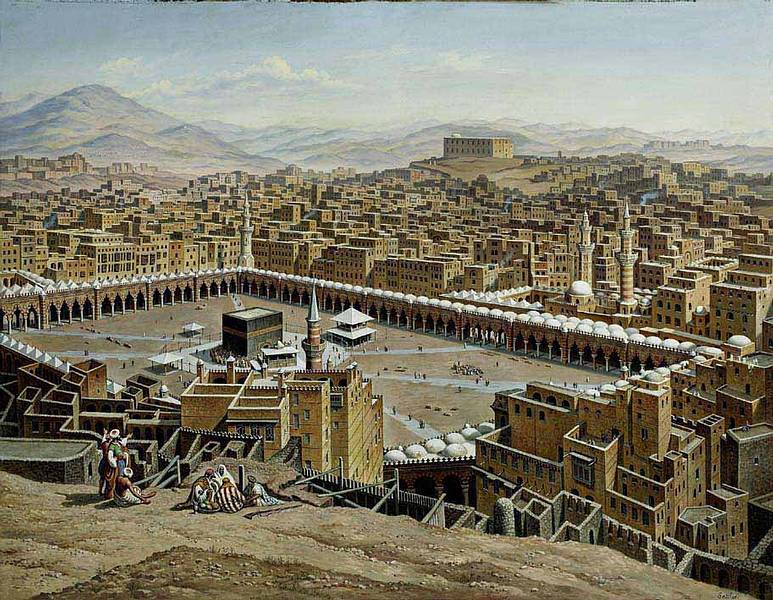
Mecca, 1897

== Gallery: Other landscapes and city views by Hubert Sattler ==
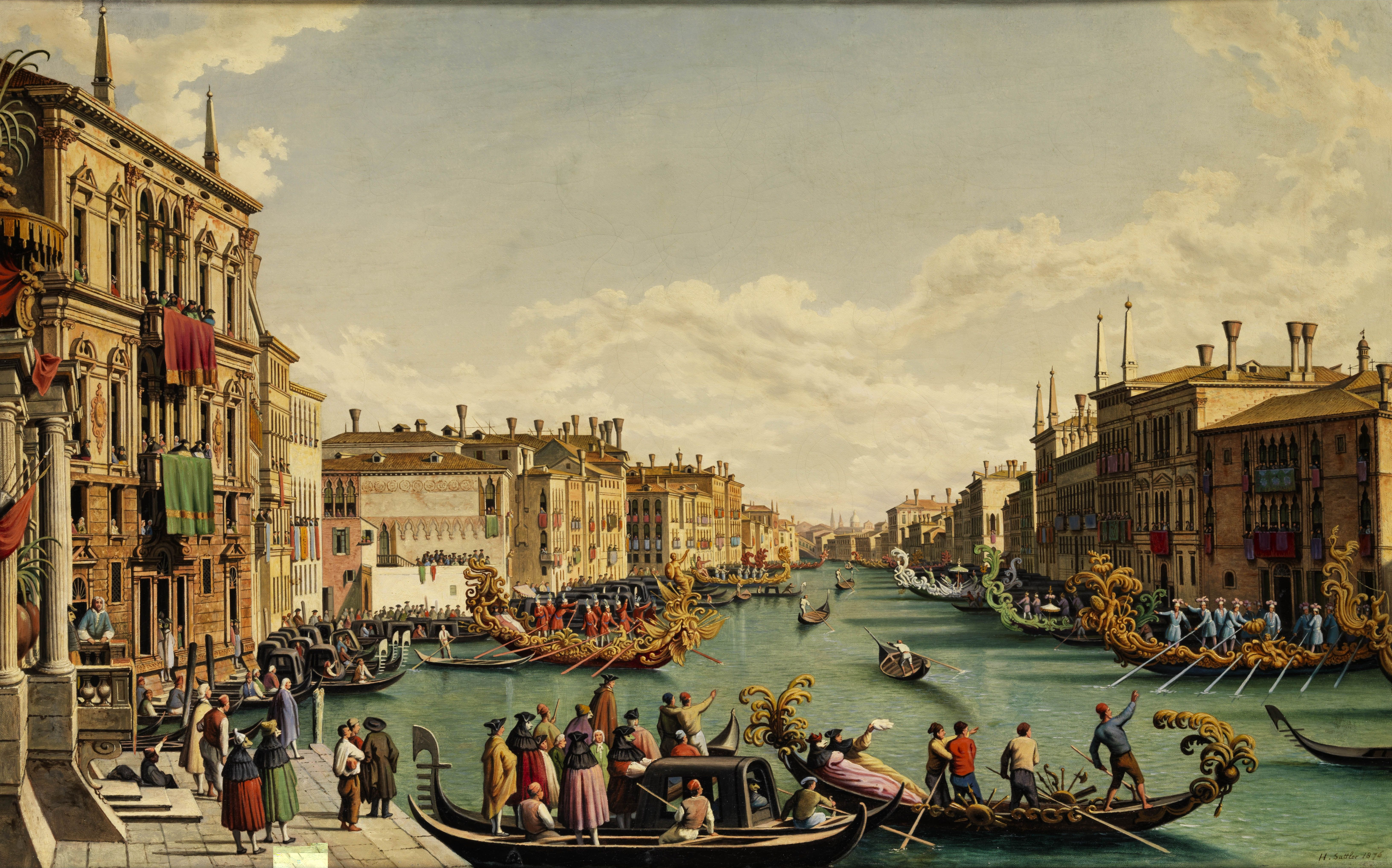
Feast of the Redeemer in Venice, 1876

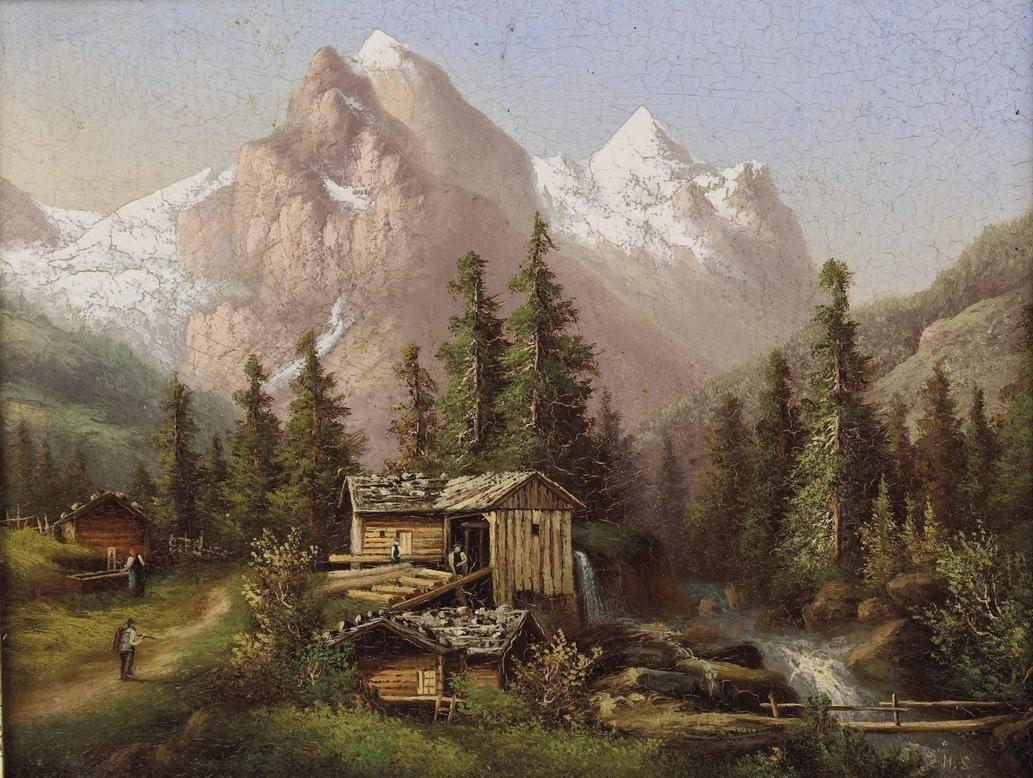
Timbering High in the Alps

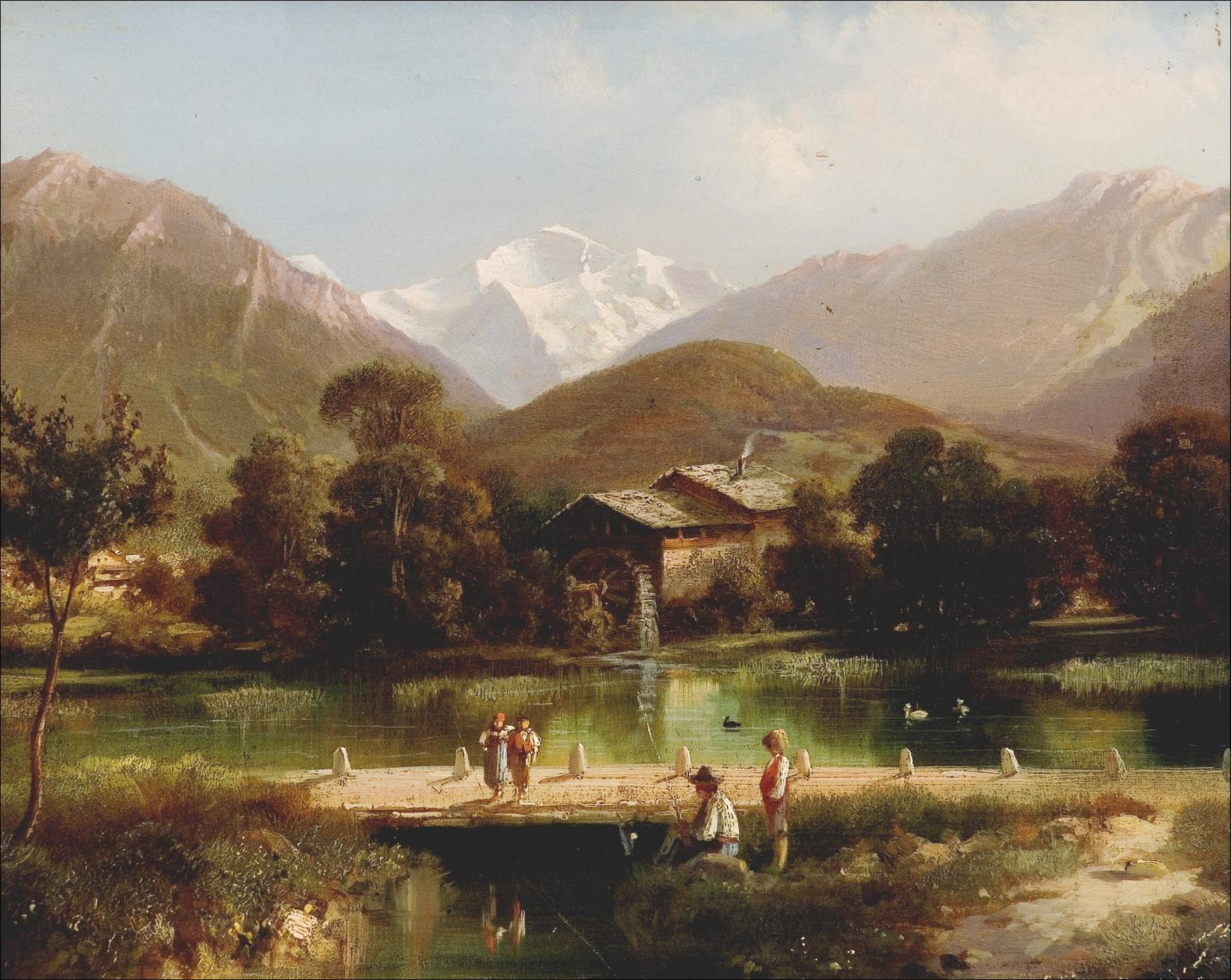
Watermill with a Mountain View

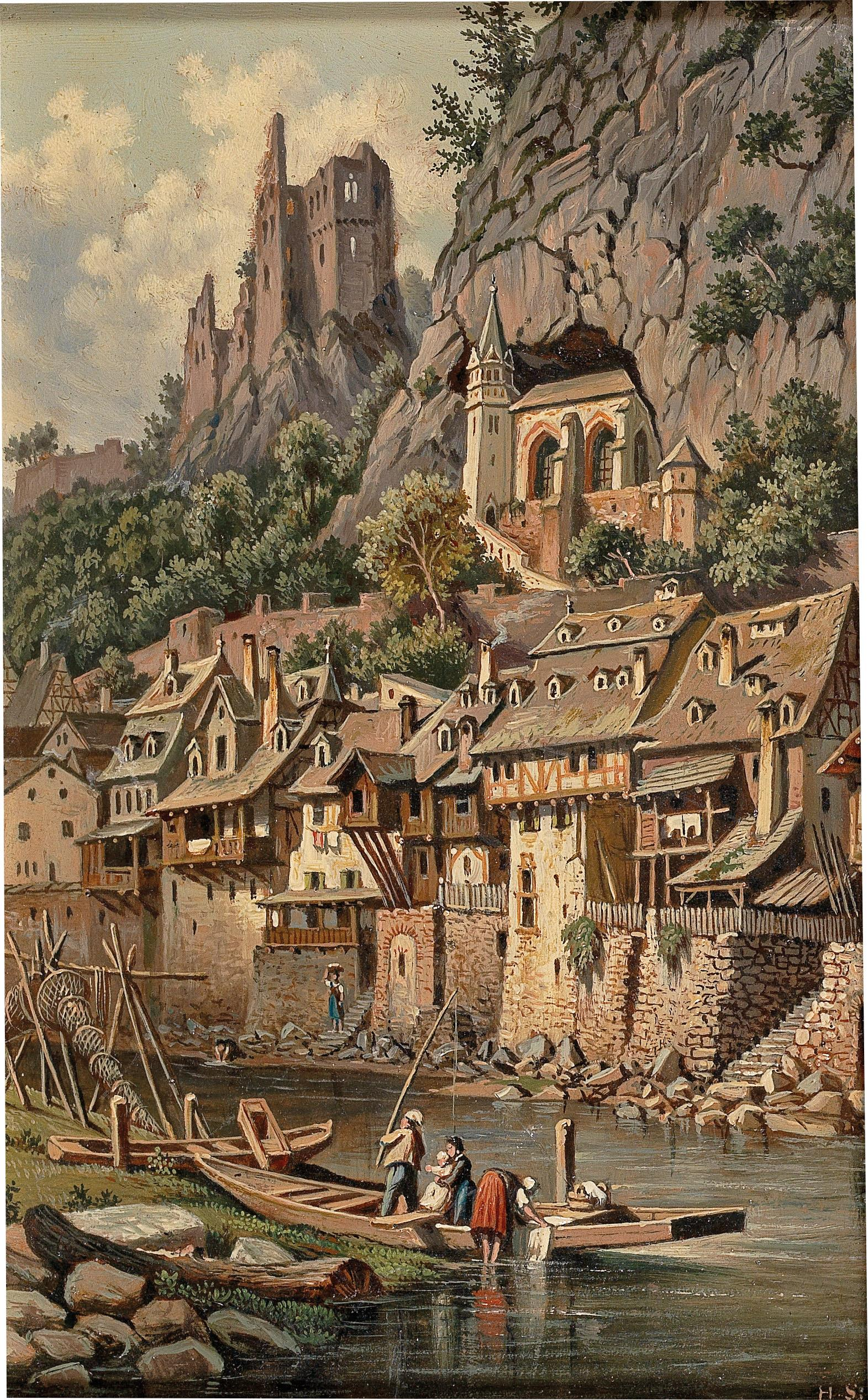
Rock Church and Castle Ruins in Idar-Oberstein

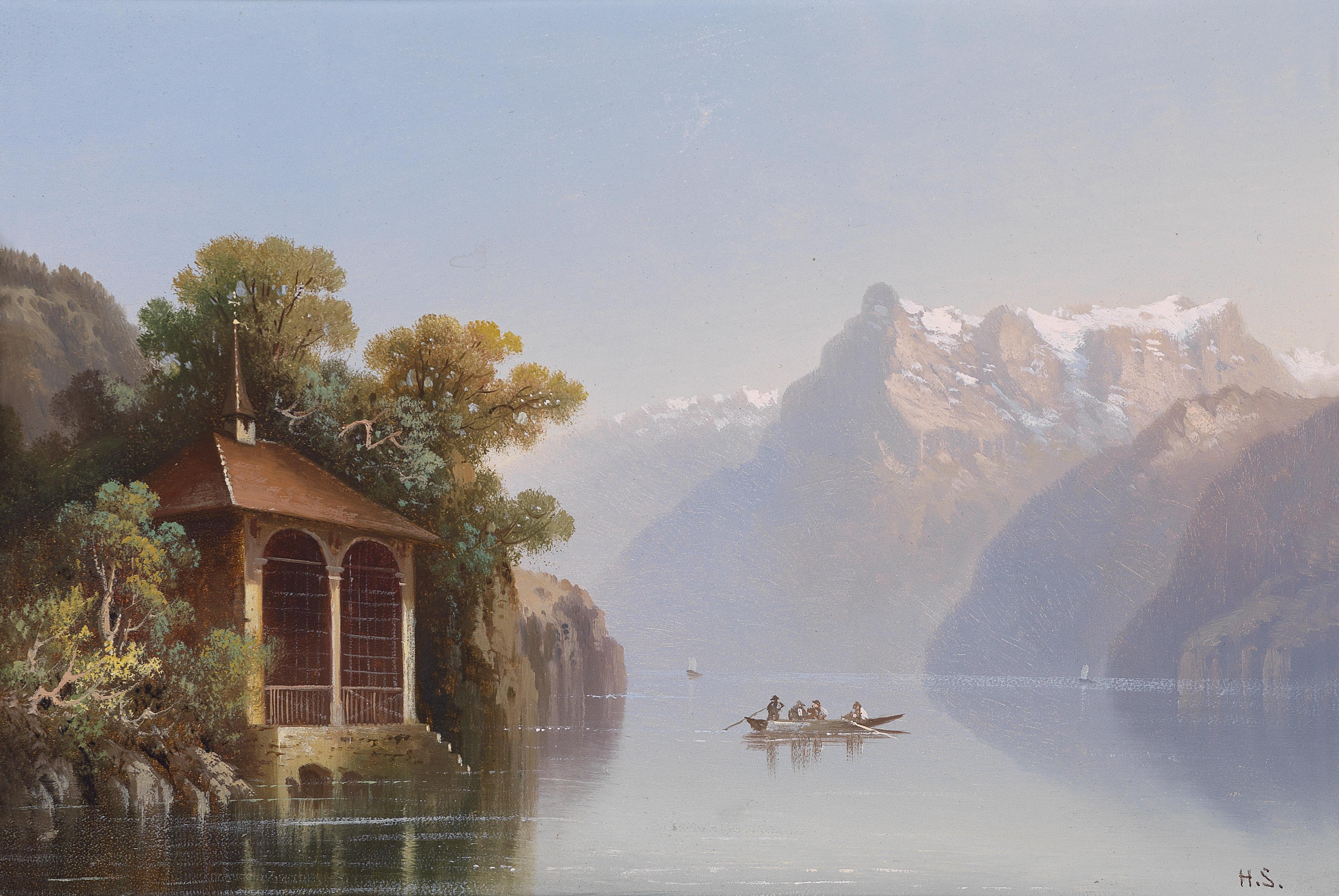
Tellskapelle, Lake Lucerne (William Tell Chapel)
