= Stattler =

Stattler is a surname. Notable people with the surname include:

- Benedict Stattler (1728–1797), German Jesuit theologian
- Wojciech Stattler (1800–1875), Polish painter

== See also ==
- Sattler
