= Doriprismatica balut =

Scientific classification
- Kingdom: Animalia
- Phylum: Mollusca
- Class: Gastropoda
- Order: Nudibranchia
- Family: Chromodorididae
- Genus: Doriprismatica
- Species: D. balut

Binomial name
- Doriprismatica balut Matsuda & Gosliner, 2018

Species of gastropod

Doriprismatica balut is a species of sea slug, a dorid nudibranch, a shell-less marine gastropod mollusk in the family Chromodorididae.

== Distribution ==
This species was described from Maricaban Strait, Mabini (Calumpan Peninsula), Batangas Province, Luzon, Philippines, 13.644°N 120.889°E, and several other localities in the Philippines.
