= Doriprismatica marinae =

Scientific classification
- Kingdom: Animalia
- Phylum: Mollusca
- Class: Gastropoda
- Order: Nudibranchia
- Family: Chromodorididae
- Genus: Doriprismatica
- Species: D. marinae

Binomial name
- Doriprismatica marinae Matsuda & Gosliner, 2018

Species of gastropod

Doriprismatica marinae is a species of sea slug, a dorid nudibranch, a shell-less marine gastropod mollusk in the family Chromodorididae.

== Distribution ==
This species was described from Pointe Evatra, Madagascar, 24.986620°S 47.100504°E.
