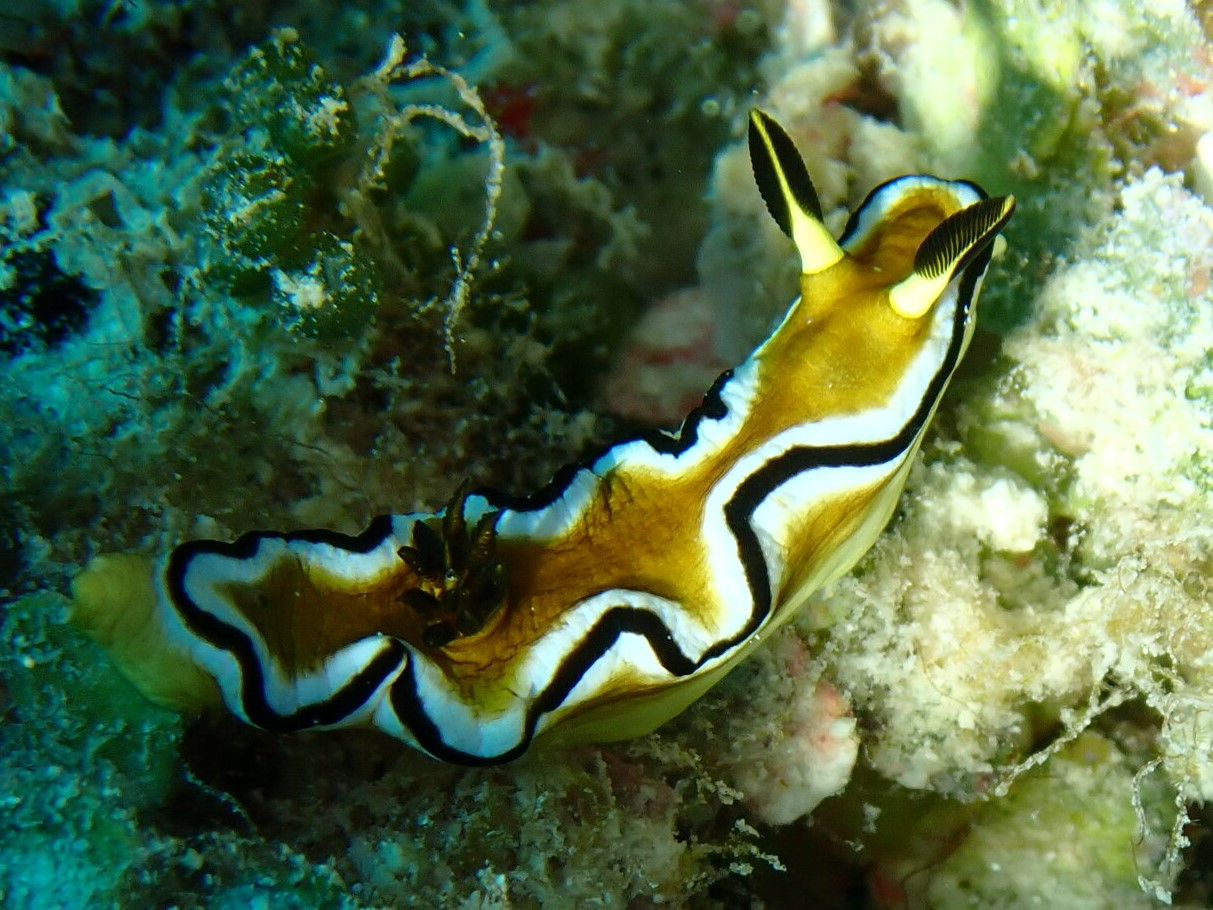

Scientific classification
- Kingdom: Animalia
- Phylum: Mollusca
- Class: Gastropoda
- Order: Nudibranchia
- Family: Chromodorididae
- Genus: Doriprismatica
- Species: D. sibogae

Binomial name
- Doriprismatica sibogae (Bergh, 1905)

Synonyms
- Chromodoris sibogae Bergh, 1905 (basionym); Glossodoris sibogae (Bergh, 1905); Glossodoris undulata Pruvot-Fol, 1954

= Doriprismatica sibogae =

Species of gastropod

Doriprismatica sibogae is a species of sea slug, a dorid nudibranch, a shell-less marine gastropod mollusk in the family Chromodorididae.

== Distribution ==
This species is found in the tropical Pacific Ocean and is known from Indonesia, Fiji and French Polynesia.

== Description ==
Doriprismatica sibogae is very similar in appearance to Doriprismatica atromarginata, but can be distinguished from that species by the intense yellow colour of the mantle and foot. The black mantle edge is separated from the yellow of the back by a white line.
