= Ernst Adolf Coccius =

German ophthalmologist (1825–1890)

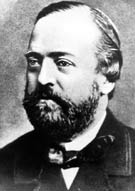
Ernst Adolf Coccius

Ernst Adolf Coccius (19 September 1825 – 24 November 1890) was a German ophthalmologist who was a native of Knauthain, which today is part of the city of Leipzig.

He studied medicine in Leipzig, Prague and Paris, and earned his degree in 1848 with the thesis "De morbis typhum sequentibus". From 1849 to 1857 he served as an assistant to Friedrich Philipp Ritterich at the Leipzig Eye Clinic, becoming its director and a full professor in 1867, positions he held up until his death in 1890. After his death, he was succeeded by Hubert Sattler (1844-1928) at the University of Leipzig.

In 1853, Coccius provided the first description of retinal breaks of the eye, and subsequently made the association to retinal detachment. In 1853 he devised an ophthalmoscope that was a modification of the device invented by Hermann von Helmholtz (1821-1894).

His elder brother was the pianist and pedagogue Theodor Coccius (1824-1897).

== Written works ==
- Über die Ernährungsweise der Hornhaut und die Serum führenden Gefässe im menschlichen Körper. Müller, Leipzig 1852.
- Ueber die Anwendung des Augenspiegels nebst Angabe eines neuen Instruments. (On the use of the ophthalmoscope, etc.) Müller, Leipzig 1853.
- Über die Neubildung von Glashäuten im Auge. Müller, Leipzig 1858.
- Ueber Glaucom, Entzündung und die Autopsie mit dem Augenspiegel. (On glaucoma, inflammation and the autopsy with the ophthalmoscope) Müller, Leipzig 1859
- Ueber das Gewebe und die Entzündung des menschlichen Glaskörpers. (On the tissue and the inflammation of the human vitreous) Müller, Leipzig 1860.
- Der Mechanismus der Accommodation des menschlichen Auges: nach Beobachtungen im Leben dargestellt. (The accommodation mechanism of the human eye, according to empirical observations); Teuber, Leipzig 1868.
- Die Heilanstalt für arme Augenkranke zu Leipzig zur Zeit ihres fünfzigjährigen Bestehens. Vogel, Leipzig 1870. (with Theodor Wilhelmi).
- Ophthalmometia und Spannungsmessungen am kranken Auge. Leipzig 1872.
- Die Diagnose des Sehpurpurs im Leben. (Diagnosis of visual purple); Leipzig 1877.
