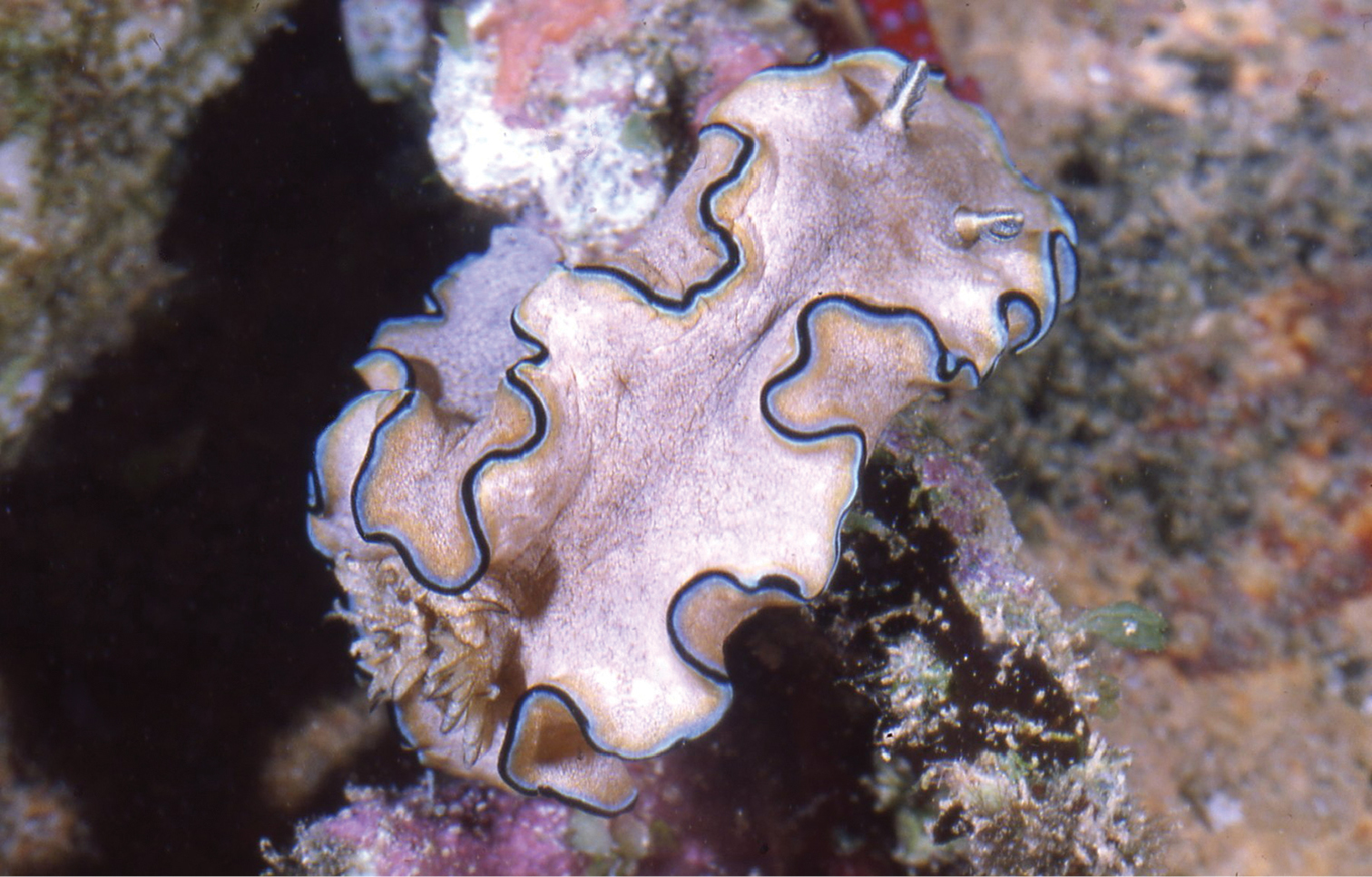

Scientific classification
- Kingdom: Animalia
- Phylum: Mollusca
- Class: Gastropoda
- Order: Nudibranchia
- Family: Chromodorididae
- Genus: Doriprismatica
- Species: D. kyanomarginata

Binomial name
- Doriprismatica kyanomarginata Yonow, 2018

= Doriprismatica kyanomarginata =

Species of gastropod

Doriprismatica kyanomarginata is a species of sea slug, a dorid nudibranch, a shell-less marine gastropod mollusk in the family Chromodorididae.

== Distribution ==
This species was described from Egypt with additional material from The Creek, Jeddah, Saudi Arabia.

== Description ==
Doriprismatica kyanomarginata is predominantly mottled light beige in colour. The mantle edge is extensively folded as in other Doriprismatica and Glossodoris species with coloured lines at the edge. There is a transition from beige to yellow, followed by a line which is pale blue and then an outer black line in this species.
