= Doriprismatica rossi =

Scientific classification
- Kingdom: Animalia
- Phylum: Mollusca
- Class: Gastropoda
- Order: Nudibranchia
- Family: Chromodorididae
- Genus: Doriprismatica
- Species: D. rossi

Binomial name
- Doriprismatica rossi Matsuda & Gosliner, 2018

Species of gastropod

Doriprismatica rossi is a species of sea slug, a dorid nudibranch, a shell-less marine gastropod mollusk in the family Chromodorididae.

== Distribution ==
This species was described from West Manghar Island, Saudi Arabia, Red Sea.
