= Doriprismatica dendrobranchia =

Scientific classification
- Kingdom: Animalia
- Phylum: Mollusca
- Class: Gastropoda
- Order: Nudibranchia
- Family: Chromodorididae
- Genus: Doriprismatica
- Species: D. dendrobranchia

Binomial name
- Doriprismatica dendrobranchia (Rudman, 1990)

Synonyms
- Glossodoris dendrobranchia Rudman, 1990 (basionym)

Species of gastropod

Doriprismatica dendrobranchia is a species of sea slug, a dorid nudibranch, a shell-less marine gastropod mollusk in the family Chromodorididae.

== Distribution ==
This species is found only off the Great Barrier Reef in Australia.
