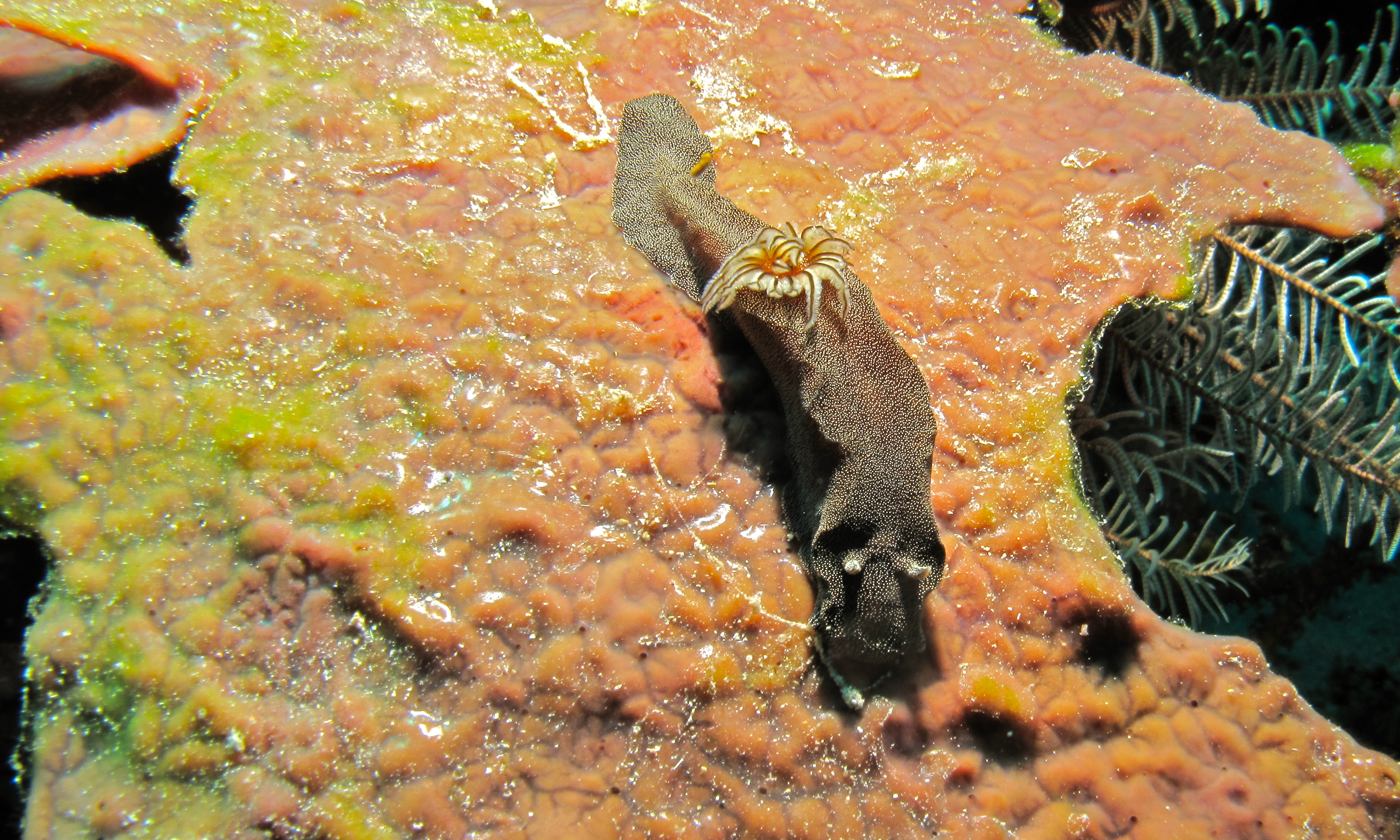

Scientific classification
- Kingdom: Animalia
- Phylum: Mollusca
- Class: Gastropoda
- Order: Nudibranchia
- Family: Chromodorididae
- Genus: Doriprismatica
- Species: D. stellata

Binomial name
- Doriprismatica stellata Rudman, 1986

Synonyms
- Glossodoris stellata >Rudman, 1986 (basionym)

= Doriprismatica stellata =

Species of gastropod

Doriprismatica stellata is a species of sea slug, a dorid nudibranch, a shell-less marine gastropod mollusk in the family Chromodorididae.

== Distribution ==
This species is found in the Western Pacific Ocean from Papua New Guinea, Indonesia and Malaysia.
