= Sattler's layer =

Layer of the eye

Details

Identifiers
- Latin: lamina vasculosa

Sattler's layer, named after Hubert Sattler, an Austrian ophthalmologist, is one of five (or six (Note: Some authors consider the vascular region of the choroid as being two separate layers, namely Sattler's and Haller's layer, and some consider the lamina fusca as being either of scleral or choroidal origin.)) layers of medium-diameter blood vessels of the choroid, and a layer of the eye. It is situated between the Bruch's membrane, choriocapillaris below, and the Haller's layer and suprachoroidea above, respectively. The origin seems to be related to a continuous differentiation throughout the growth of the tissue and even further differentiation during adulthood.

== Measurement methods and clinical impact ==
After excision the choroid collapses partially, histologic preparations also alter the local pressure and fluid content of different sections in the tissue, thus requiring preparations with rubber solution or others that can conserve the vascular status of living tissue. Novel diagnostic methods, especially optical coherence tomography have widened the understanding of the real-time, in vivo status of the different layers.

Several papers have shown the relationship between the thickness of the choroidal, Sattler's and Haller's layer between healthy individuals and in people with age-related macular degeneration (AMD). The studies showed significant reduction of layer thickness in relation to the progression of AMD, which may be important in the understanding of choriopathy in the pathophysiology of AMD. However, also strong variations even throughout the diurnal cycle, as well as the influence of optical stimuli during eye-growth, indicate that the complex function of this tissue is not entirely understood and might be one of the reasons for the frequently found separation in vascular size between Haller's and Sattler's layer.
