= Johann Scheffer von Leonhardshoff =

Austrian painter and graphic artist (1795–1822)

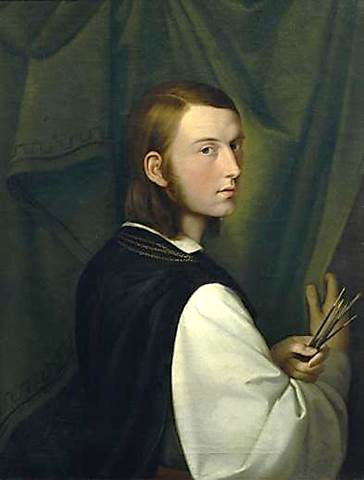
Self-portrait (1820)

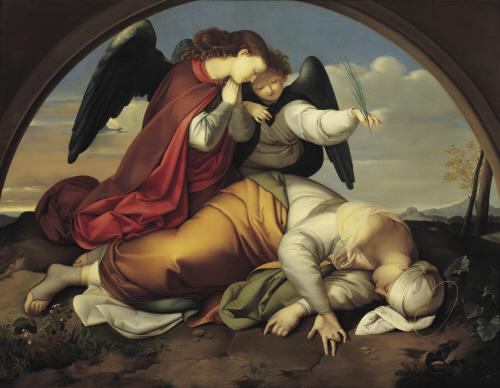
The Death of Holy Caecilia (1821)

Johann Evangelist Scheffer von Leonhardshoff (30 October 1795 – 12 January 1822) was an Austrian painter and graphic artist associated with the Nazarene movement.

== Life ==
He was born on 30 October 1795 in Vienna. He belonged to a noble but poor family that originally came from Fulda and was barely more than a child when he began studies at the Academy of Fine Arts, Vienna, under Hubert Maurer. He came under the influence of the Nazarene movement, however, and moved away from the Academic painting style. In 1812, he took a trip to Venice to visit his sister, then went on to Ferrara, which is the place where he may have contracted the tuberculosis that would cause his early death.

When he returned from Italy, he settled in Klagenfurt, where the Prince-bishop of Gurk, Franz Xaver Salm-Reifferscheid, became his patron and appointed him Court Painter. In 1814, he was able to undertake another, extensive tour of Italy, during which he was admitted to see Pope Pius VII and received the Supreme Order of Christ for painting the Pope's portrait. After that, his friends jokingly referred to him as "Raffaelino" (Little Raphael). In 1816, he returned to Klagenfurt and fell seriously ill. He moved to Vienna in 1819 and took a last trip to Italy from 1820 to 1821. Back in Vienna he was rejected by his long-time love, Caecilia Bontzak, who felt ignored, and his illness worsened rapidly. He died in Vienna on 12 January 1822, just a few months after his 26th birthday.
