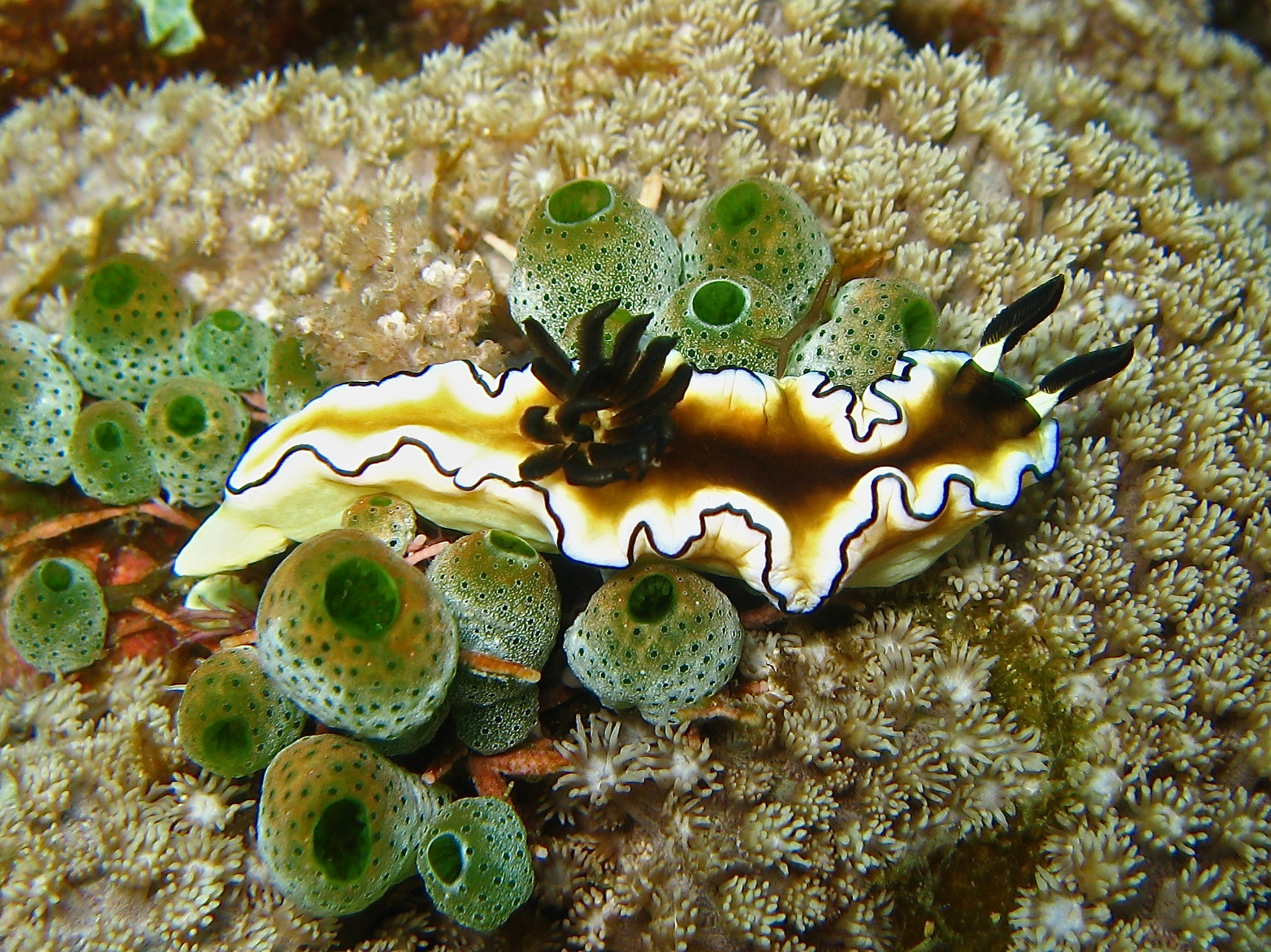
- Doriprismatica atromarginata

Scientific classification
- Kingdom: Animalia
- Phylum: Mollusca
- Class: Gastropoda
- Order: Nudibranchia
- Family: Chromodorididae
- Genus: Doriprismatica d'Orbigny, 1839

Type species
- Doris atromarginata Cuvier, 1804

Synonyms
- Crepidodoris Pagenstecher, 1877

= Doriprismatica =

Genus of gastropods

Doriprismatica is a genus of sea slugs, dorid nudibranchs, shell-less marine gastropod mollusks belonging to the Chromodorididae family.

== Species ==
Species in the genus Doriprismatica include:

- Doriprismatica atromarginata (Cuvier, 1804)
- Doriprismatica balut Matsuda & Gosliner, 2018
- Doriprismatica dendrobranchia (Rudman, 1990)
- Doriprismatica kyanomarginata Yonow, 2018
- Doriprismatica kulonba (Burn, 1966)
- Doriprismatica marinae Matsuda & Gosliner, 2018
- Doriprismatica paladentata (Rudman, 1986)
- Doriprismatica plumbea (Pagenstecher, 1877)
- Doriprismatica rossi Matsuda & Gosliner, 2018
- Doriprismatica sibogae (Bergh, 1905)
- Doriprismatica stellata (Rudman, 1986)
- Doriprismatica tibboeli (Valdés & M.J. Adams, 2005)

Species brought into synonymy

- Doriprismatica festiva A. Adams, 1861: synonym of Hypselodoris festiva (A. Adams, 1861)
- Doriprismatica imperialis (Pease, 1860): synonym of Hypselodoris imperialis (Pease, 1860)
- Doriprismatica sedna (Ev. Marcus & Er. Marcus, 1967): synonym of Chromolaichma sedna (Ev. Marcus & Er. Marcus, 1967)
