= Algernon Ashton =

English composer, pianist, and professor

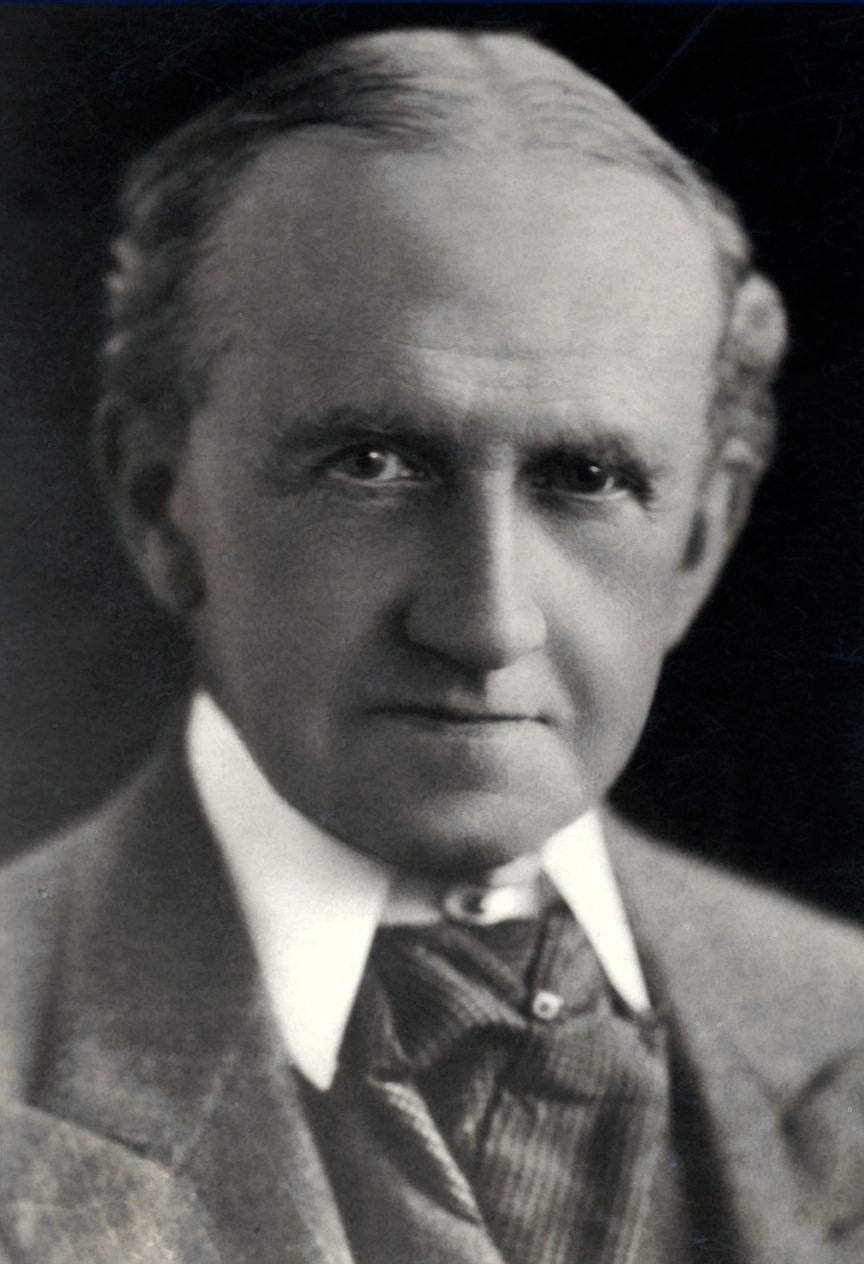
Algernon Ashton

Algernon Bennet Langton Ashton (9 December 1859 – 10 April 1937) was a British composer, pianist, and Professor of piano at the Royal College of Music 1884–1910.

Ashton was born in Durham. He studied at the Leipzig Conservatory as a pupil of Carl Reinecke and Theodor Coccius. He later studied at Hoch Conservatory in Frankfurt under Joachim Raff.

Ashton was a prolific composer in many instrumental genres. His published works exceeded 160, but there were many other unpublished works, some of which are lost. These included five symphonies, a piano concerto, a violin concerto, 24 piano sonatas, one in each key, and 24 string quartets along the same lines. The orchestral version of his Three English Dances was heard at The Proms in October 1912. Modern recordings of four of the highly virtuosic piano sonatas and two cello sonatas have been released. The Tarantella for clarinet, Op. 107, has also been recorded.

In later years Ashton became well known for his many letters to English newspapers concerning the upkeep of the graves of distinguished people. These letters were published in two volumes - Truth Wit and Wisdom and More Truth Wit and Wisdom published by Chapman & Hall.

Ashton was also well known for keeping a daily diary for the majority of his life from the age of 15 running to some 58 volumes. The diaries and the unpublished works are believed to have been destroyed during the Blitz when his family home was hit by German bombs.

== Recordings ==
- Complete Piano Sonatas, Vol. 1, Leslie De’ath, Dutton Epoch CDLX 7248 (2010)
  - No. 4 in D Minor, Op. 164 (published 1925)
  - No. 5 in F Sharp, Op. 168
  - No. 6 in A Minor, Op. 170
  - No. 8 in F, Op. 174 (published 1926)
  - 4 Klavierstücke, Op. 72
  - Nocturne und Menuet, Op. 39 (published 1888)
- Piano Works Vol. 1, Daniel Grimwood, Toccata Classics TOCC0063 (2010)
  - Nocturne and Menuet, Op.39
  - Sonata No.4 in D minor, Op.164
  - Sonata No. 8 in F major, Op.174
  - Vier Bagatellen, Op.79 (published 1892)
- Music for Cello and Piano, Vol.1, Emma Abbate, Evva Mizerska, Toccata Classics TOCC0143 (2012)
  - Arioso, Op. 43 (published 1889)
  - Cello Sonata No. 1 in F major, Op. 6 (published 1880)
  - Cello Sonata No. 2 in G major, Op. 75 (1885)
  - Phantasiestücke, Op. 12 (published 1883)
- The Victorian Clarinet Tradition, Colin Bradbury and Oliver Davies, Clarinet Classics CC0022 (1997)
  - Tarantella for clarinet, Op. 107
