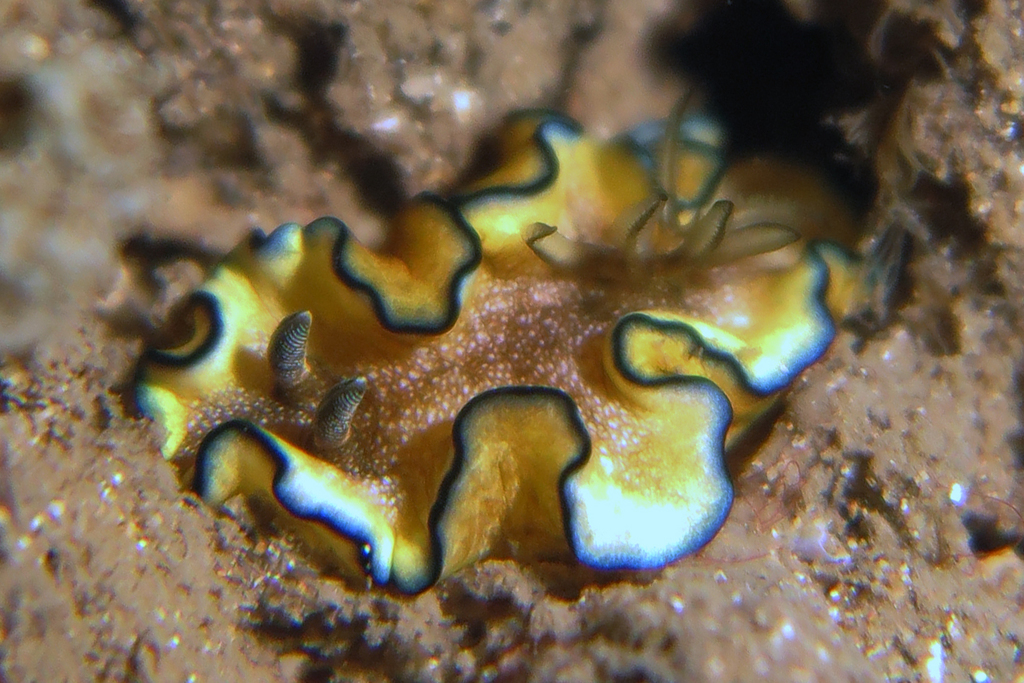

Scientific classification
- Kingdom: Animalia
- Phylum: Mollusca
- Class: Gastropoda
- Order: Nudibranchia
- Family: Chromodorididae
- Genus: Doriprismatica
- Species: D. plumbea

Binomial name
- Doriprismatica plumbea (Pagenstecher, 1877)

Synonyms
- Crepidodoris plumbea Pagenstecher, 1877 (basionym); Glossodoris plumbea (Pagenstecher, 1877)

= Doriprismatica plumbea =

Species of gastropod

Doriprismatica plumbea is a species of sea slug, a dorid nudibranch, a shell-less marine gastropod mollusk in the family Chromodorididae.

== Distribution ==
This species is found only in the Red Sea, and around Tanzania in the Western Indian Ocean.
