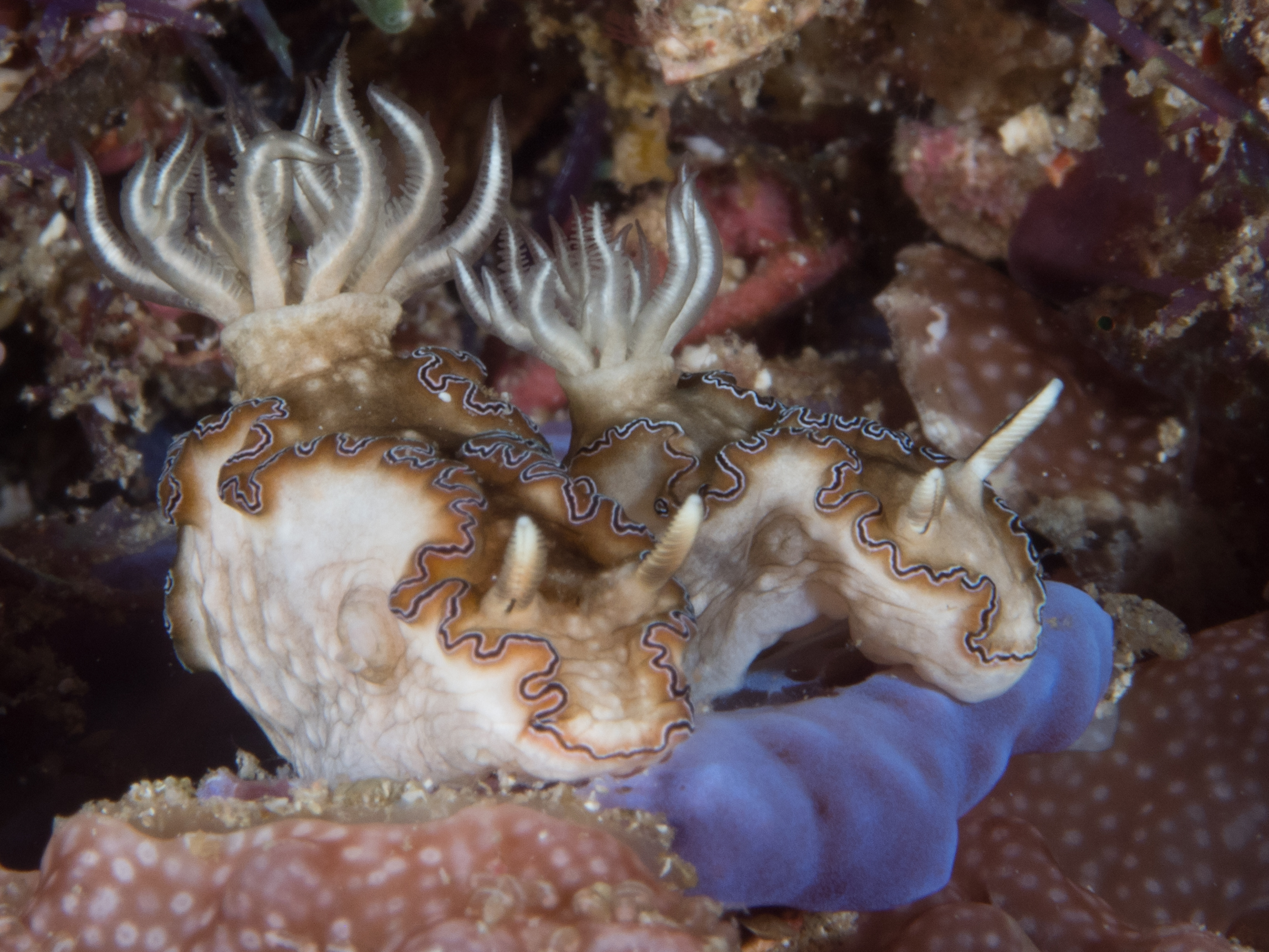

Scientific classification
- Kingdom: Animalia
- Phylum: Mollusca
- Class: Gastropoda
- Order: Nudibranchia
- Family: Chromodorididae
- Genus: Doriprismatica
- Species: D. paladentata

Binomial name
- Doriprismatica paladentata (Rudman, 1986)

Synonyms
- Glossodoris paladentata Rudman, 1986 (basionym)

= Doriprismatica paladentata =

Species of gastropod

Doriprismatica paladentata is a species of sea slug, a dorid nudibranch, a shell-less marine gastropod mollusk in the family Chromodorididae.

== Distribution ==
This species is found only in Papua New Guinea and Vanuatu in the Western Pacific Ocean.
