= Hubert Sattler =

Austrian-German ophthalmologist (1844–1928)

Hubert Sattler (9 September 1844 – 15 November 1928) was an Austrian-German ophthalmologist born in Salzburg. His father, also named Hubert Sattler (1817–1904), and grandfather, Johann Michael Sattler (1786–1847), were both landscape painters.

He studied medicine at the University of Vienna, where he later served as an assistant to ophthalmologist Carl Ferdinand von Arlt (1812–1887). In 1877, he attained the chair of ophthalmology at the University of Giessen, two years later relocating to the University of Erlangen. In 1886, he was named director of the eye clinic at Prague, and in 1891 succeeded Ernst Adolf Coccius (1825–1890) at the University of Leipzig, where he served as director of the ophthalmological clinic for the remainder of his life.

Sattler distinguished himself in his histological and histopathological research of the eye, in particular his work involving the choroid and conjunctiva. He published works on trachoma, operative treatment of myopia, pulsating exophthalmos, Basedow's disease, tuberculosis and inflammatory conditions involving the optic nerve. His treatise on Basedow's disease was included in the Graefe/Saemisch Handbuch der gesamten Augenheilkunde.

== Selected written works ==
- Ueber die sogenannten Cylindrome und deren Stellung im onkologischen Systeme. (1874)
- Die Basedowsche Krankheit. (1909); English translation, Basedow's disease. (1952)
- Beschreibung eines augenspiegels zur untersuchung der netzhaut im lebended auge. (1910)
