= Friedrich Philipp Ritterich =

German ophthalmologist (1782–1866)

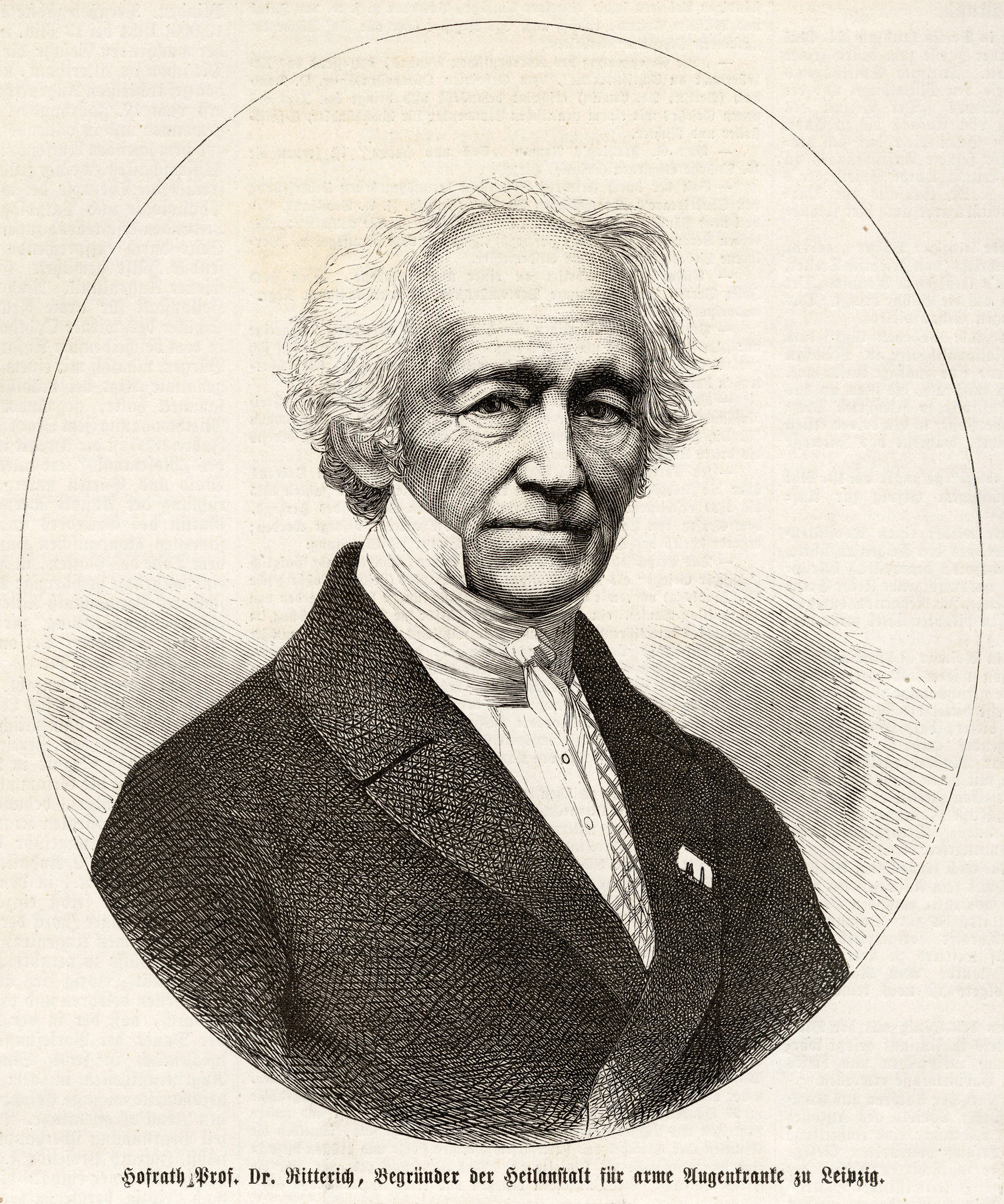
Friedrich Philipp Ritterich

Friedrich Philipp Ritterich (4 May 1782, Leipzig – 12 February 1866, Leipzig) was a German ophthalmologist.

He studied medicine in Leipzig and Jena, and following graduation continued his education in Vienna with ophthalmologists Georg Joseph Beer (1763–1821) and Johann Adam Schmidt (1759–1809). In 1807 he became privat-docent to the medical faculty at the University of Leipzig, where in 1820 he was appointed professor of ophthalmology. In 1820 he also founded a private eye clinic in Leipzig.

During the late 1850s he succumbed to severe amblyopia, causing him to quit his practice and limit his workload to literary pursuits. Eventually he went completely blind and died in 1866 at the age of 83.

Ritterich made contributions involving writings on squint, and investigations on diseases of the lachrymal nasal canal and the effect of the eye muscles (with anatomist Eduard Weber 1806–1871).

== Written works ==
- Jährliche Beiträge zur Vervollkommnung der Augenheilkunst, volume 1, 1827.
- Das Schielen und seine Heilung, 1843 – Squint and associated healing.
- Die Lehre vom Schielen und über das Anpaßungsvermögen der Augen, 1856. – Doctrine of strabismus and the adaptation ability of the eyes.
- Lehre von den blutigen Augenoperationen am menschlichen Körper, 1858.
- Die Hornhautbeere. Staphylom der Hornhaut, 1859 – Staphyloma of the cornea.
- Weitere Beiträge zur Vervollkommnung der Augenheilkunst, 1861 – Additional contributions to improvement of ophthalmic medicine.
