= Hubert Maurer =

German artist (1738–1818)

- Portrait of Hubert Maurer by Johann Jakob Laurenz Billwiller (1779–1832), Amsterdam, Rijksmuseum
- Born: 10 June 1738; Bonn, Electorate of Cologne
- Died: 10 December 1818 (aged 80); Vienna, Austrian Empire
- Education: Academy of Fine Arts Vienna
- Known for: Painting; Engraving
- Movement: Neoclassicism

Hubert Maurer (10 June 1738 – 10 December 1818) was a German painter, graphic artist and art professor.

== Life and work ==
Maurer was born in Bonn and began as a student of the Bavarian court painter, Johann Georg Winter (1707–1770). He continued his education at the Academy of Fine Arts, Vienna, where one of his instructors, the mentally unstable sculptor, Franz Xaver Messerschmidt, apparently tried to murder him in a fit of paranoia.

From 1772 to 1776, he was one of the first group of German painters to receive a pension that enabled them to study in Rome (the Deutschrömer). There, he was able to work with Anton Raphael Mengs. From 1785, he was a councilor and Professor at the Vienna Academy's elementary drawing school; a position he would hold until 1817. He also produced teaching materials, such as studies of the Old Masters of the Italian Renaissance, which marked the beginning of Classicism at the academy. He became known for paintings of subjects from Greek mythology.

His numerous well known students include Karl Agricola, Johann Scheffer von Leonhardshoff, Moritz Michael Daffinger, Ferdinand Georg Waldmüller, Karl Ruß, Wilhelm August Rieder, Kilian Ponheimer, Peter Fendi, Eustație Altini, Johann Baptist von Lampi, Friedrich von Amerling and Johann Michael Sattler, who would later become Maurer's biographer. Sattler also married his foster daughter, Anna Maria Kittenberger, in 1816.

He died in Vienna, and a street in his birthplace of Bonn has been named after him.

== Selected works ==
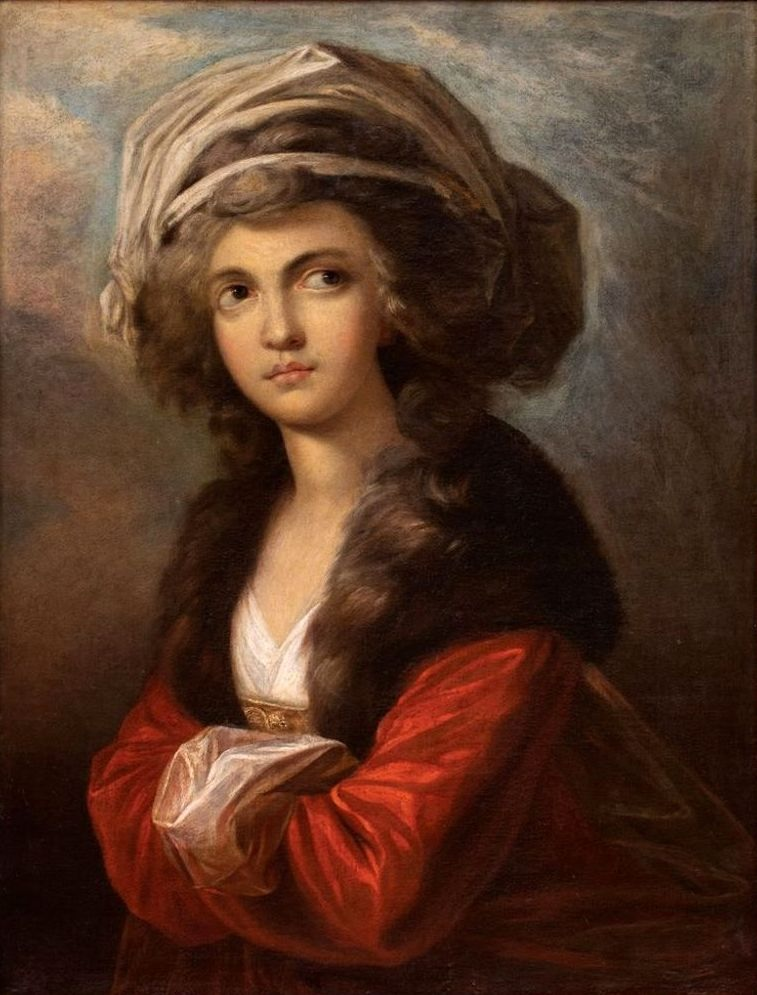
Portrait of Zofia Potocka

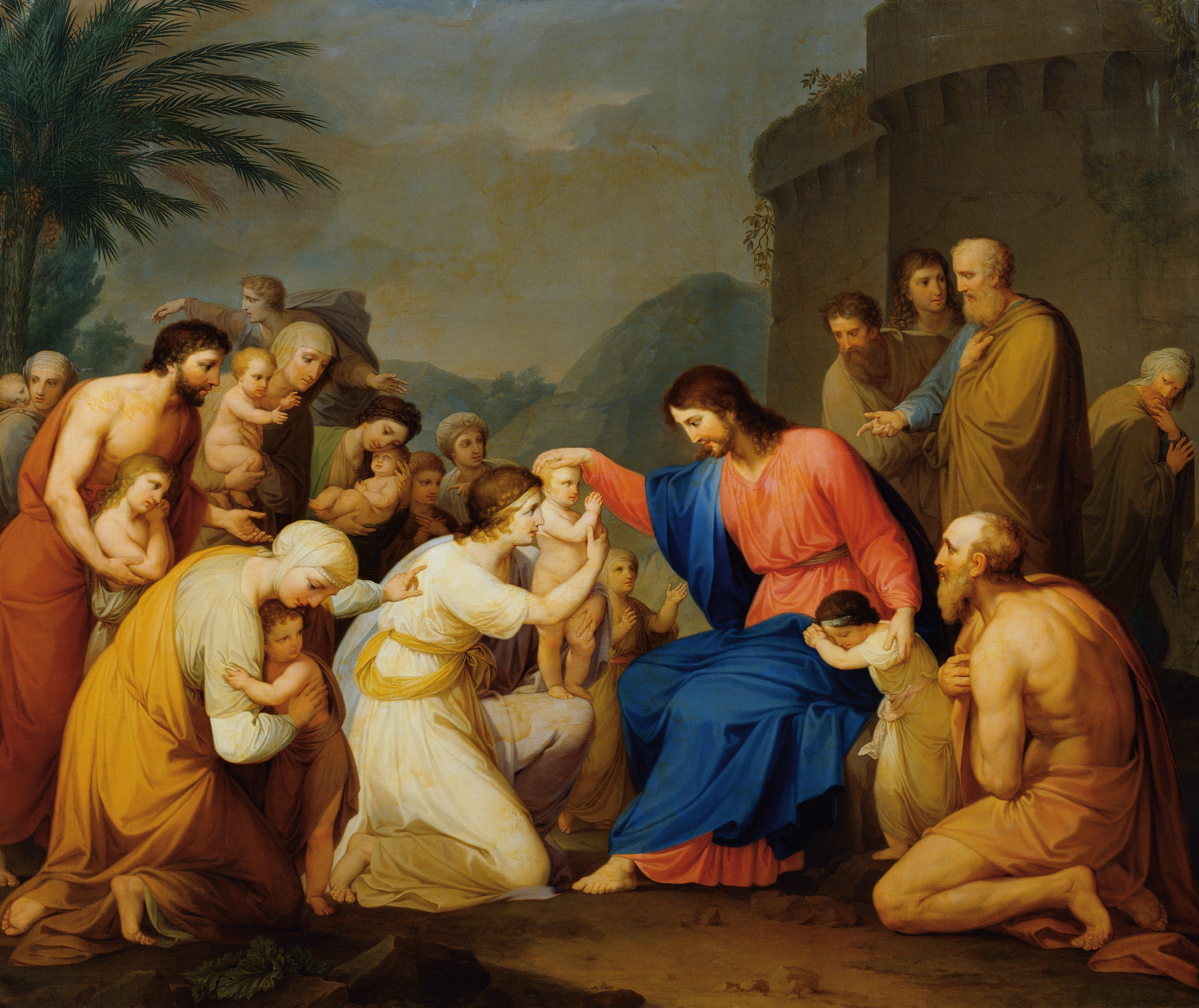
Let the Children Come unto Me

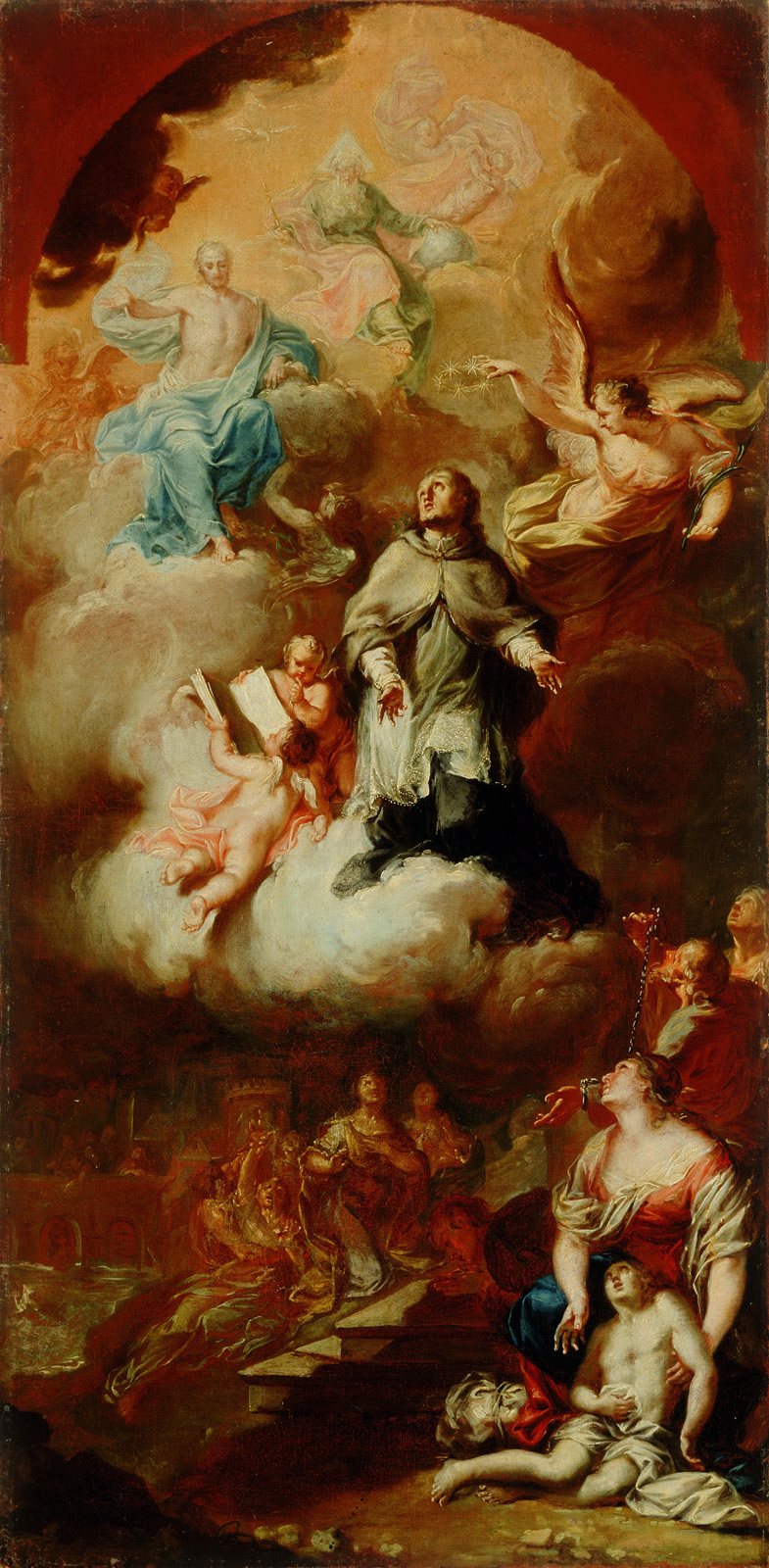
Johann Nepomuk

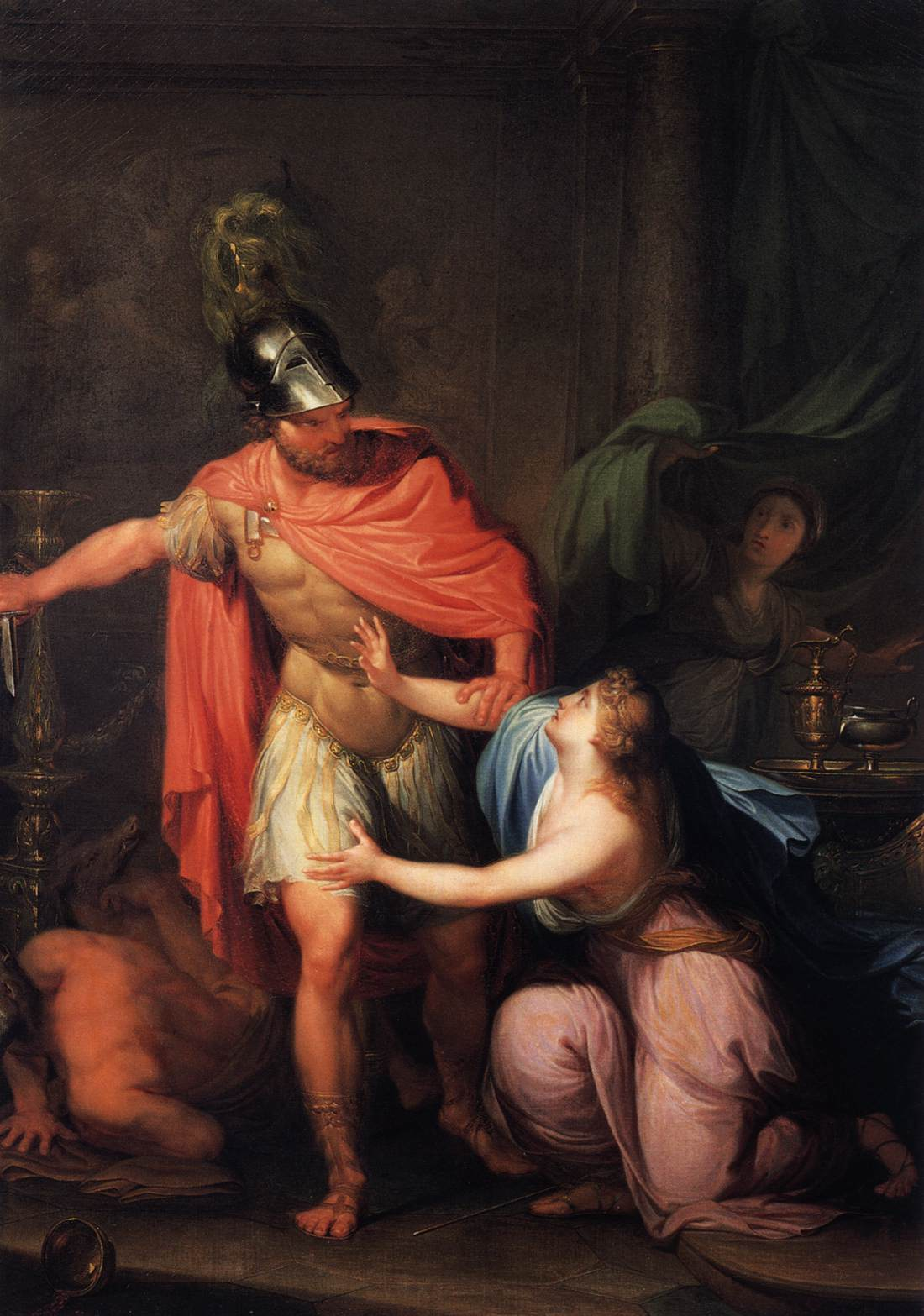
Circe and Odysseus

== Sources ==
- "Bildungsgeschichte: Hubert Maurer Historienmahler und Prof. der Angewandten in W". In: Vaterländische Blätter für den österreichischen Kaiserstaat, 1810, Vol.2, Nr. 37/38, pp. 311 ff.
- Johann Michael Sattler: Lebensgeschichte des Hubert Maurer weiland Kaiserl. Königl. akademischen Rathes, Professor und Mitglied der vereinigten bildenden Kuenste in Wien nach mündlichen Erzählungen, Original-Aufsätzen und Anm. nebst dem Verzeichnisse seiner Bilder, seinem Porträt und der Ansicht seines Geburtshauses, Vienna, Schrämbl, 1819.
- Constantin von Wurzbach: "Maurer, Hubert." In: Biographisches Lexikon des Kaiserthums Oesterreich (Biographical Lexicon of the Empire of Austria). Part 17 Kaiserlich-königliche Hof- und Staatsdruckerei, Vienna 1867, p. 140–149 (digitalised).
- Bettina Hagen: Antike in Wien. Die Akademie und der Klassizismus um 1800. Eine Ausstellung der Gemäldegalerie der Akademie der Bildenden Künste Wien vom 27. November 2002 bis 9. März 2003 und der Winckelmann-Gesellschaft im Winckelmann-Museum Stendal vom 11. Mai bis 27. Juli 2003, Mainz: Philipp von Zabern, 2002, ISBN 3-8053-3056-1.
- Herbert Weffer: "Aus dem Leben des Malers Hubert Maurer aus Röttgen", in: Die Laterne, Vol.30, 2003, Westdeutsche Gesellschaft für Familienkunde e.V., Bezirksgruppe Bonn
