= Theodor Coccius =

German music educator

Theodor Coccius (8 March 1824 – 24 October 1897) was a German pianist and pedagogue.

Coccius was born in Knauthain near Leipzig in 1824. He was a pupil of Sigismond Thalberg.

He taught at the Leipzig Conservatory from 1864 for the rest of his life, alongside Ignaz Moscheles and Carl Reinecke. His notable pupils included Oskar Merikanto, Aleksander Michałowski (1867–69), and Algernon Ashton.

He was the elder brother of the ophthalmologist Ernst Adolf Coccius (1825–1890).

He died in Leipzig in 1897, aged 73.
