= Hermann Pagenstecher =

German ophthalmologist (1844–1932)

Hermann Pagenstecher (September 16, 1844 – December 31, 1932) was a German ophthalmologist born in Langenschwalbach.

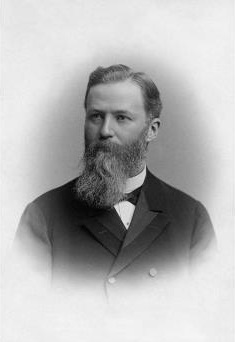
Hermann Pagenstecher

In 1867 he obtained his doctorate from the University of Würzburg, and shortly afterwards was an assistant at the internal medicine clinic in Greifswald (1867–68). Later he studied with ophthalmologist Albrecht von Graefe (1828–1870) in Berlin, then subsequently took an extended scientific trip to London, Edinburgh and Paris.

After returning to Germany, he worked with his older brother, Alexander Pagenstecher (1828–1879), at the latter's eye clinic in Wiesbaden. After the untimely death of his brother in 1879, he took charge of the Wiesbaden eye clinic. In 1890 he became a professor of ophthalmology.

On May 7, 1899, he visited Queen Victoria at Windsor Castle to examine her eyesight. In her private journal she wrote:

"Professor Pagenstecher, the famous German occulist, who is staying at Cumberland Lodge. He said he found my eyes no worse, in fact rather better, which is a great encouragement."

Pagenstecher is remembered for advancing his brother's pioneer work with intracapsular cataract extraction, of which he described in the monograph Die Operation des grauen Stars in geschlossener Kapsel. With Carl Genth (1844–1904), he was co-author of Atlas der pathologischen Anatomie des Augapfels (Atlas of the Pathological Anatomy of the Eyeball), a book that was later translated into English by neurologist William Richard Gowers (1845–1915).
