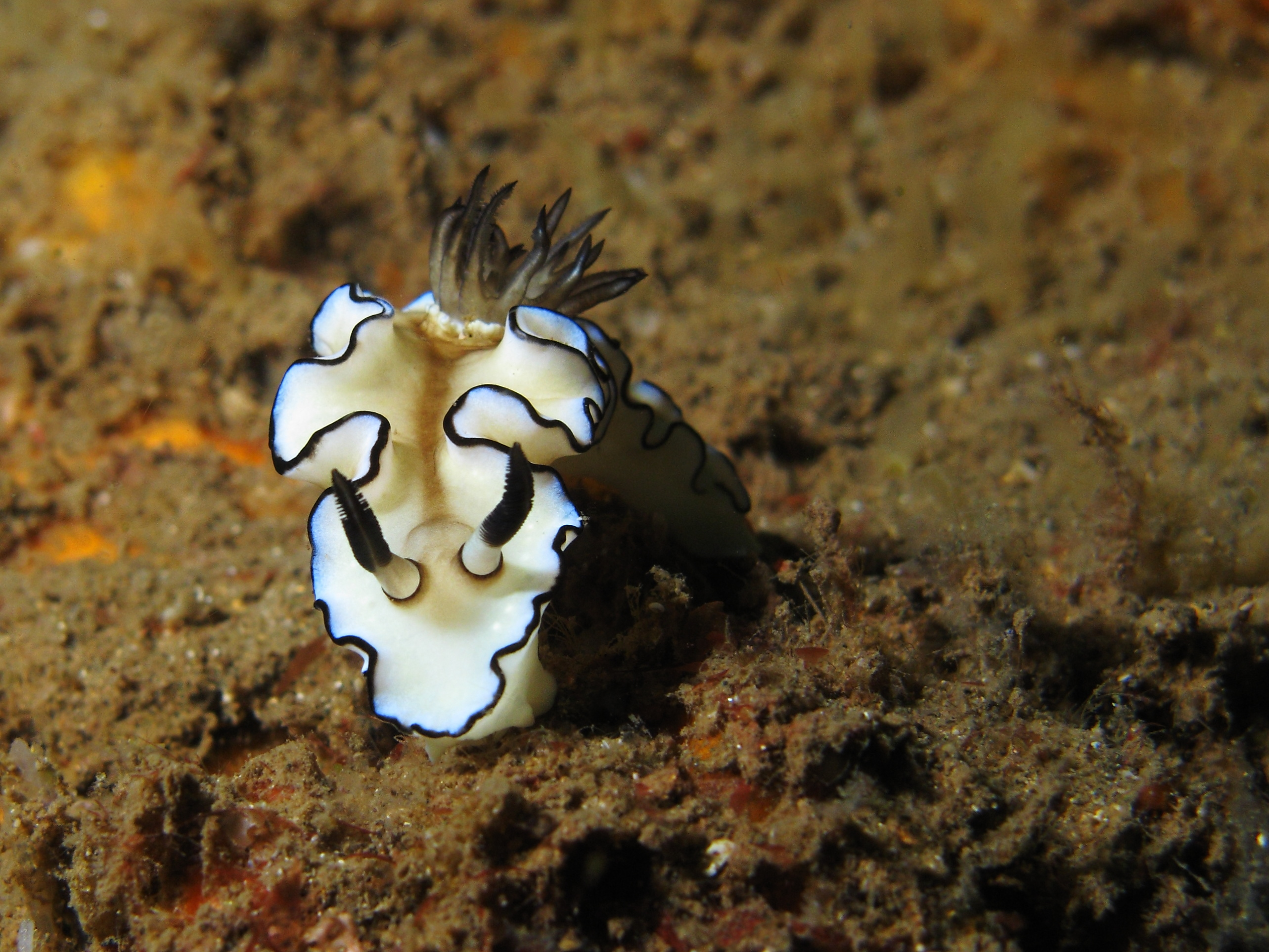
- Doriprismatica atromarginata at Bima bay, Indonesia

Scientific classification
- Kingdom: Animalia
- Phylum: Mollusca
- Class: Gastropoda
- Order: Nudibranchia
- Family: Chromodorididae
- Genus: Doriprismatica
- Species: D. atromarginata

Binomial name
- Doriprismatica atromarginata (Cuvier, 1804)

Synonyms
- Doris atromarginata Cuvier, 1804 (basionym); Glossodoris atromarginata (Cuvier, 1804); Goniodoris atromarginata (Cuvier, 1804); Casella atromarginata (Cuvier, 1804); Doris maccarthyi Kelaart, 1859; Casella maccarthyi (Kelaart, 1859); Casella philippinensis Bergh, 1874

= Doriprismatica atromarginata =

Species of gastropod

Doriprismatica atromarginata, common name Cheesecake nudibranch, is a species of sea slug. It is a dorid nudibranch, a shell-less marine gastropod mollusk in the family Chromodorididae.

== Distribution ==
This species is found throughout the tropical and sub-tropical Indo-Pacific area.

== Description ==
Doriprismatica atromarginata ranges in color from creamy-white through yellow to pale brown. It typically has a black-lined edge running down the outside of a very folded mantle and black rhinophore clubs. The frilly mantle sometimes appears to move like a wave as the animal crawls along. It can reach a total length of at least 60 mm. This species is very similar in appearance to Doriprismatica sibogae and Doriprismatica plumbea, although Doriprismatica atromarginata is by far the more common and is not quite as deep yellow in colour as the other species.

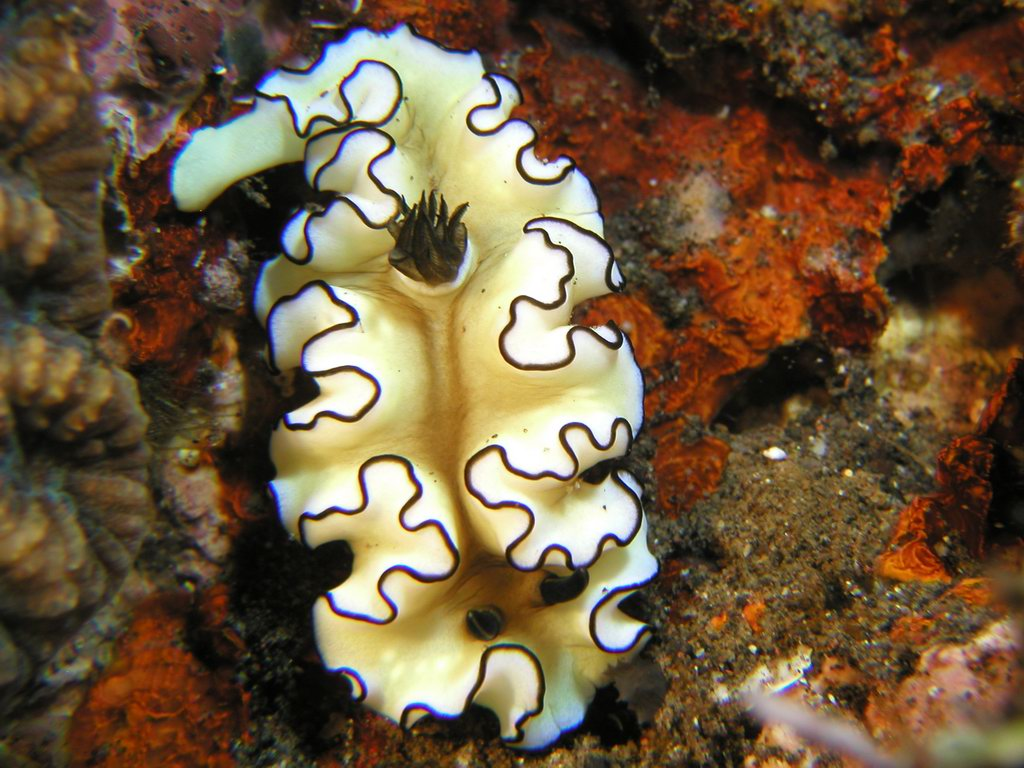
Doriprismatica atromarginata

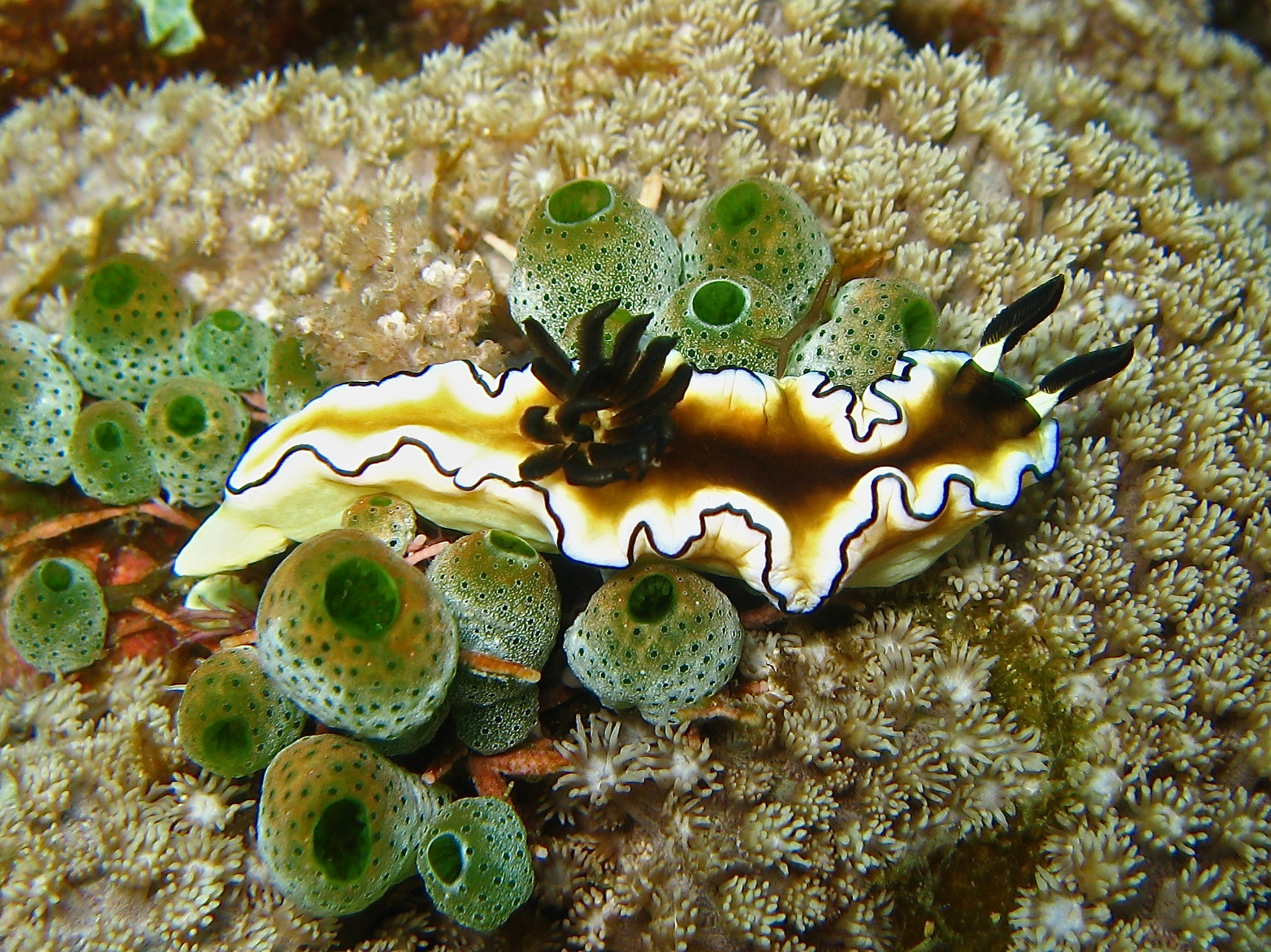
Doriprismatica atromarginata at Verde Island in the Philippines

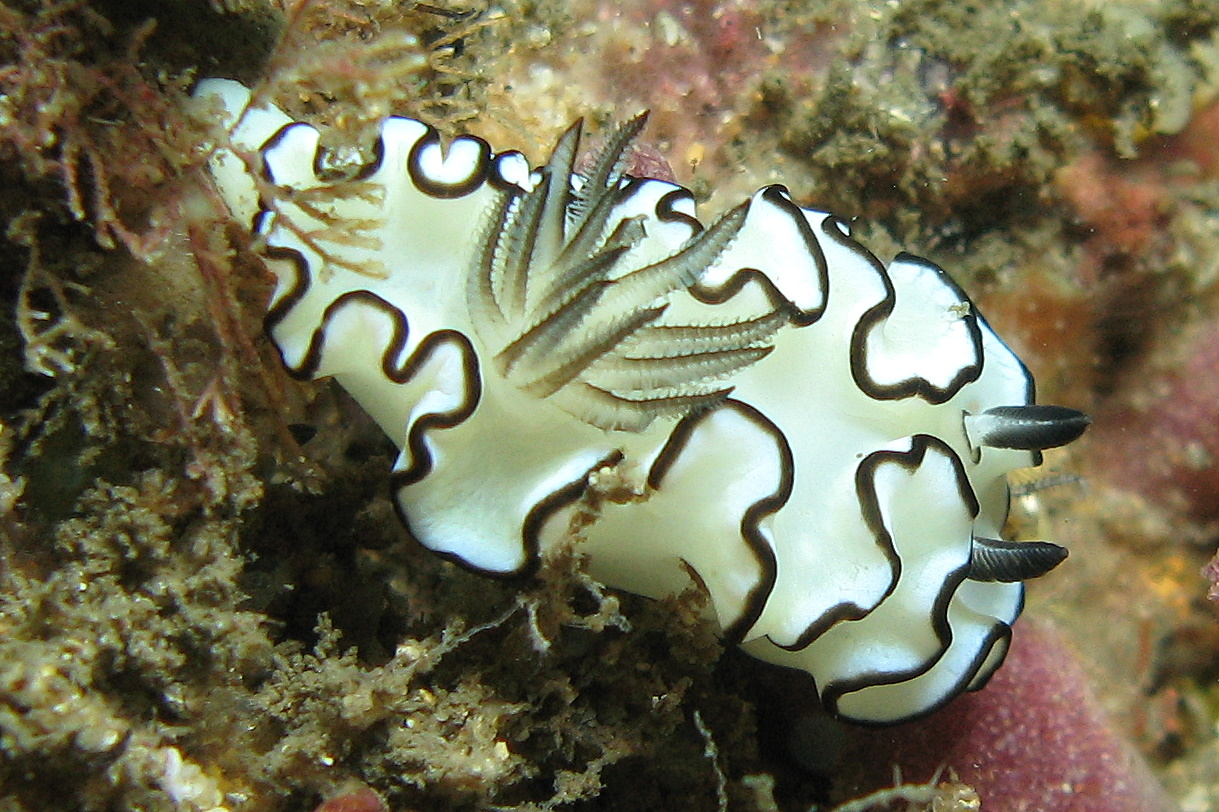
Doriprismatica atromarginata

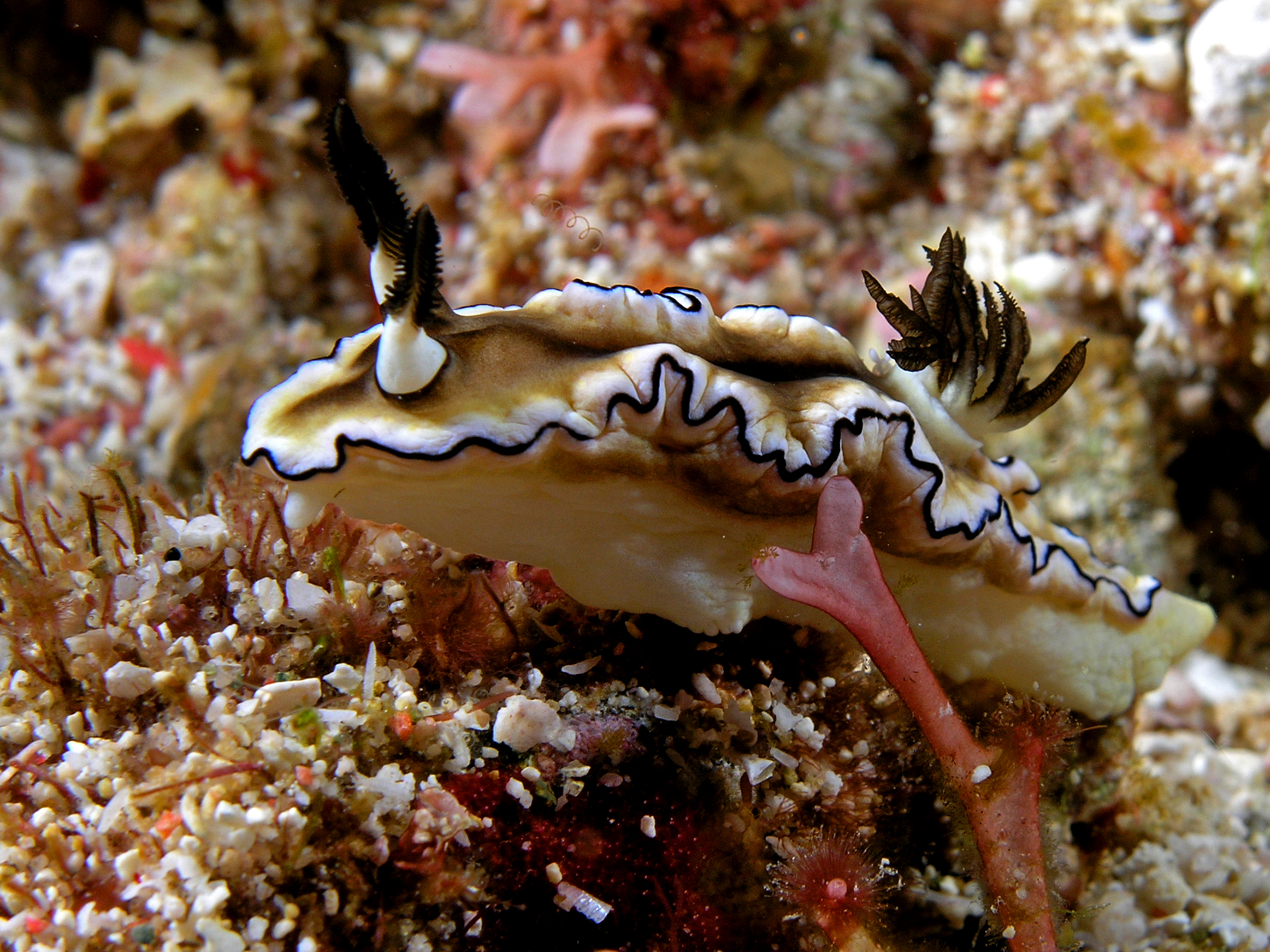
Doriprismatica atromarginata in Komodo, Indonesia

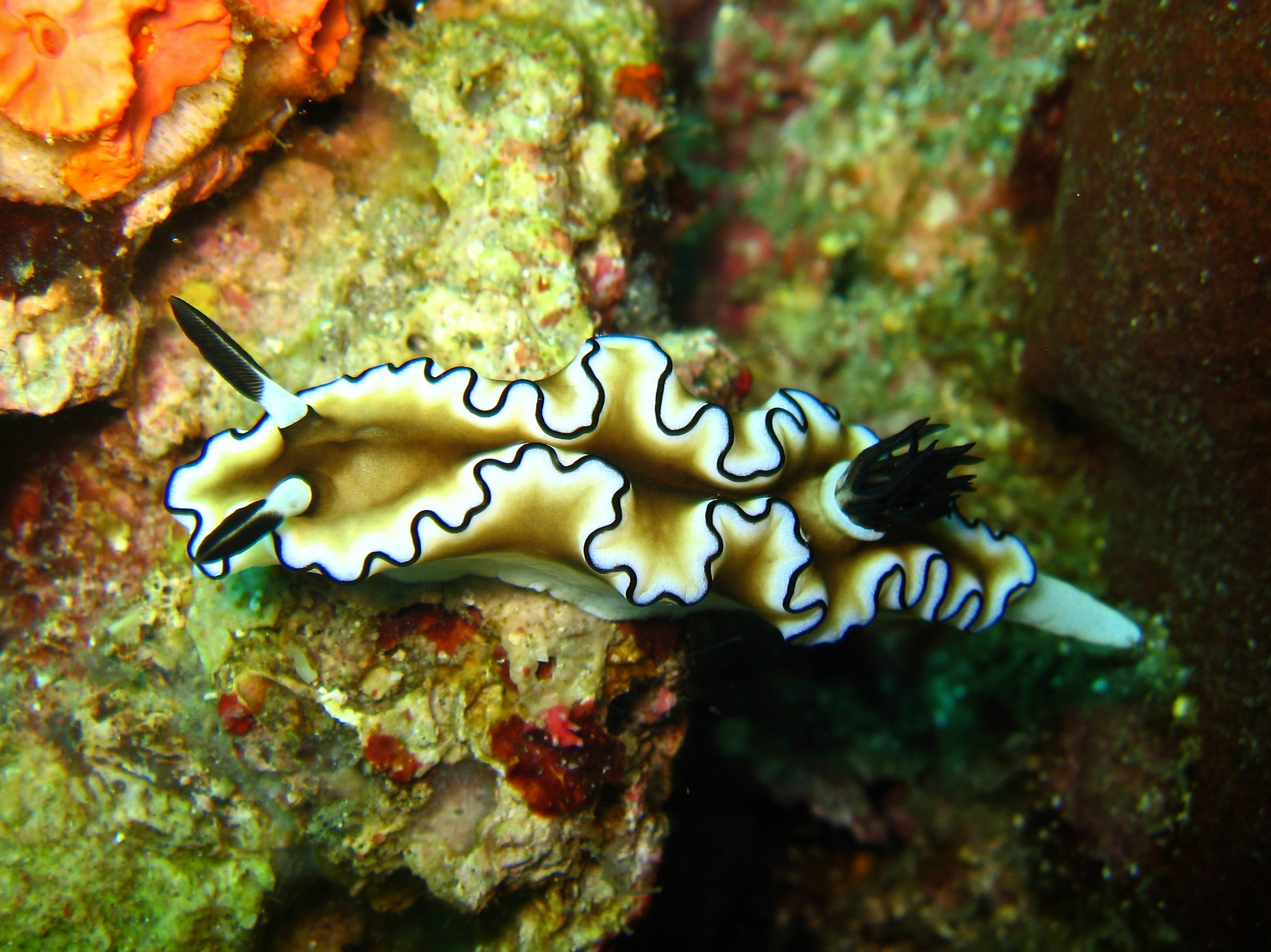
Doriprismatica atromarginata at Verde Island, the Philippines

== Ecology ==
Doriprismatica atromarginata feeds on sponges and has been seen feeding on the species Hyatella intestinalis. The species is capable of obtaining metabolites from its food source, and uses them to protect itself against predators.
