= Alfred Carl Graefe =

German ophthalmologist (1830–1899)

Alfred Carl Graefe (23 November 1830 – 12 April 1899) was a German ophthalmologist born in Martinskirchen.

From 1850 to 1854 he studied medicine at the universities of Halle, Heidelberg, Würzburg, Leipzig and Prague, then from 1855 to 1858, worked as an assistant to his cousin, ophthalmologist Albrecht von Graefe, in Berlin. During this time period, he also spent time in Paris, where he studied with Frédéric Jules Sichel and Louis-Auguste Desmarres.

In 1859 he founded a private eye clinic in Halle, and in 1873 became a full professor at the University of Halle. In 1884 he was appointed director of the newly constructed university eye clinic.

He is remembered for his work with ocular motility disorders, particularly strabismus. He was a pioneer of aseptic ophthalmic surgery involving efforts for prevention of surgical complications such as endophthalmitis. Also, he is credited with providing an early detailed description of retinal ischemia, and was the first physician to perform an extirpation of the lacrimal sac.

He collaborated with Edwin Theodor Saemisch in publishing an epic ophthalmological work titled "Handbuch des gesamten Augenheilkunde" (7 volumes, 1874–80). Graefe was physician to composer Franz Liszt when the latter suffered from failing vision. A date for cataract surgery was planned in September 1886, however Liszt died during the summer, and the surgery never took place.

== Selected written works ==
- Klinische Analyse der Motilitätsstörungen des menschlichen Auges, (Berlin 1858).
- Symptomenlehre der Augenmuskellähmungen, (1867).
- Ein Wort zur Erinnerung an A. v. Graefe, (Halle 1870).
- Handbuch der gesamten Augenheilkunde, (Leipzig 1874–80) (with Theodor Saemisch).
