= Johann Michael Sattler =

Austrian artist (1786–1847)

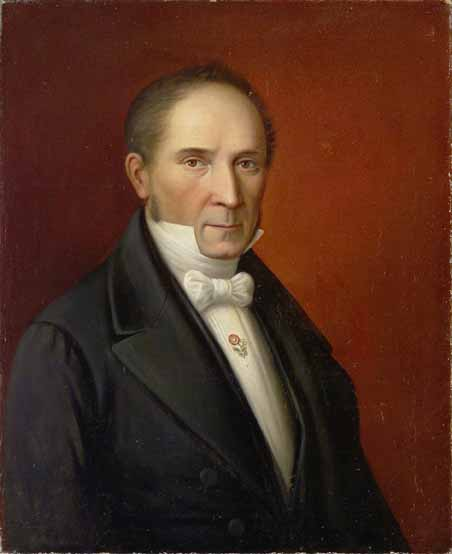
A portrait of Sattler; possibly by his son, Hubert

Johann Michael Sattler (28 September 1786, Herzogenburg – 28 September 1847, Mattsee) was an Austrian portrait and landscape painter, best known for his large-scale panoramas.

== Life and work ==
He began his studies in 1804, at the Academy of Fine Arts, Vienna, where his primary instructor was Hubert Maurer. Initially, he worked as a portrait painter. In 1816, he married Anna Maria Kittenberger, Maurer's foster daughter. Three years later, he moved to Salzburg. In 1824, he was commissioned to paint a portrait of Emnperor Francis II, who was there on a visit. He was so impressed by Sattler's talent and the beauty of the city, that he expressed a desire to see Salzburg with its romantic surroundings presented as a panorama.

That same year, he began making sketches. It was completed in 1829, with the assistance of Friedrich Loos and Johann Josef Schindler, and covered 125 square meters (app. 1,345 sq.ft.). He was named an honorary citizen in appreciation. This was followed by an extended tour throughout Europe, accompanied by his wife and two children, "with 30 tons and crossing approximately 30,000 kilometres of land and water, a feat no one had ever done before me and one which would be difficult to repeat in the future". It was shown until 1839, and made a significant contribution to the tourism industry in Salzburg.

His son, Hubert, donated the panorama to the city of Salzburg in 1870. It was set up in a specially designed pavilion at the Kurgarten in 1875. Later, it was moved to the Salzburg Museum and was severely damaged when the building was destroyed during World War II. Today, it may be seen at the Panorama Museum Salzburg, which contains several panoramas by Sattler and his son.

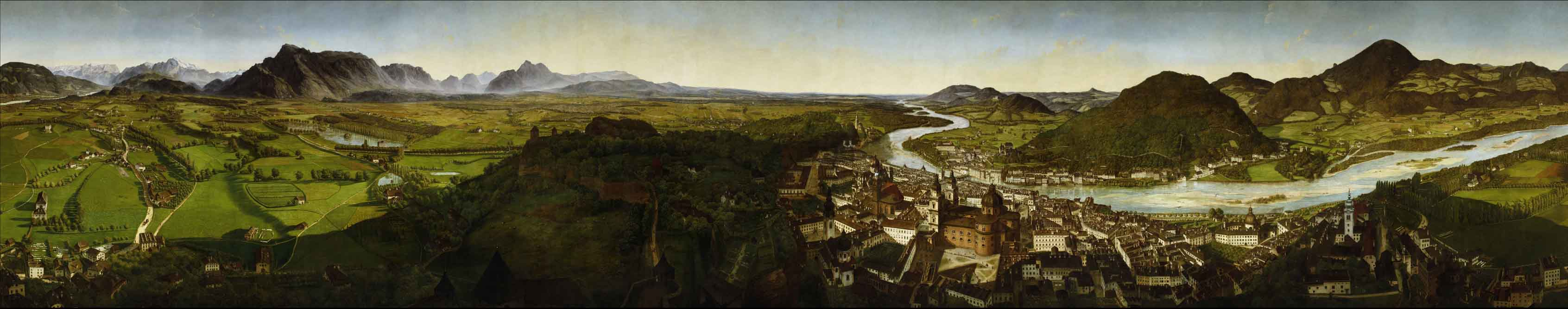
Sattler's panorama of Salzburg (4.86 × 25.81 m)
