= Alexander Pagenstecher (ophthalmologist) =

German ophthalmologist (1828–1879)

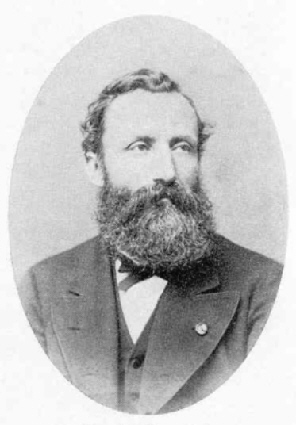
Alexander Pagenstecher (1828–1879)

Friedrich Alexander Hermann Pagenstecher (21 April 1828 – 31 December 1879) was a German ophthalmologist born in Wallau.

He studied medicine at the Universities of Gießen, Heidelberg and Würzburg. He obtained his doctorate in 1849, and in 1851 traveled to Paris to study ophthalmology. In 1856 he founded an ophthalmology hospital in Wiesbaden, and was its director until his death in 1879. At Wiesbaden, he worked closely with his brother, Hermann Pagenstecher (1844–1932), who took control of the eye hospital following his death.

Pagenstecher made several contributions in ophthalmology, and was internationally known for his treatment of glaucoma and cataracts. He is remembered for introducing a surgical practice known as intracapsular cataract extraction, and in 1862 he introduced yellow Präcipitatsalbe (precipitate salve) as an eye ointment. Pagenstecher died on 31 December 1879, from injuries sustained in a freak hunting accident.

== Written works ==
- Klinische Beobachtungen aus der Augenheilanstalt in Wiesbaden (with Edwin Theodor Saemisch and Arnold Pagenstecher). 1861/62
- Ueber die Extraction des grauen Stares bei uneröffneter Kapsel durch den Skleralschnitt, Wiesbaden 1866.
