= Edwin Theodor Saemisch =

German ophthalmologist (1833-1909)

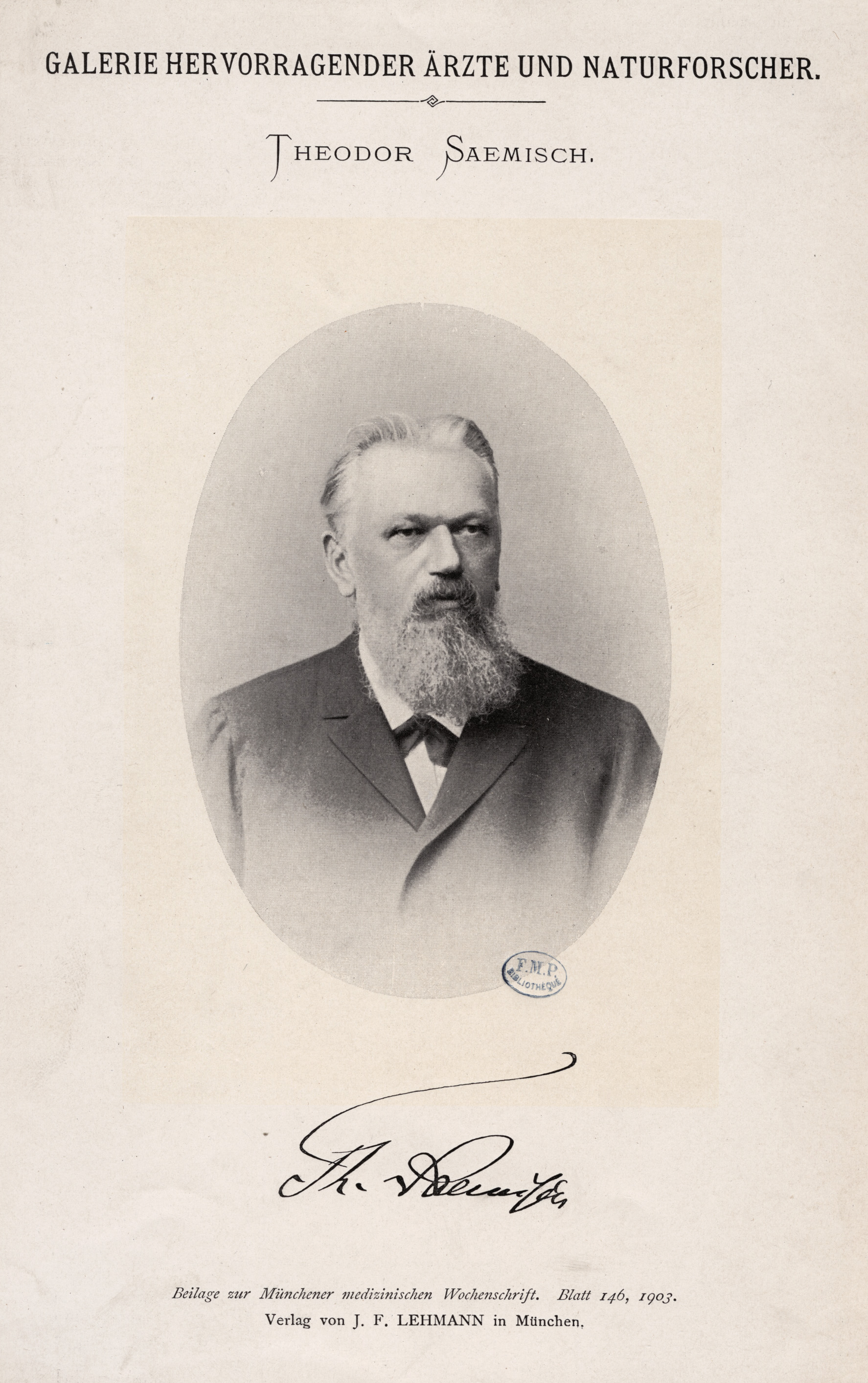
Edwin Theodor Saemisch

Edwin Theodor Saemisch (30 September 1833, Luckau – 29 September 1909, Bonn) was a German ophthalmologist born in Luckau.

In 1858 he received his medical doctorate from the University of Berlin, afterwards serving as an assistant to Albrecht von Graefe (1828-1870) in Berlin, and to Alexander Pagenstecher (1828-1879) in Wiesbaden. In 1867 he became an associate professor at the University of Bonn, and in 1873 attained the title of "full professor".

Saemisch specialized in eye disorders, particularly diseases of the conjunctiva, sclera and cornea. He is credited for providing descriptions of vernal conjunctivitis and a type of corneal ulcer called "ulcus serpens corneae". With Alfred Carl Graefe (1830-1899), a cousin of Albrecht von Graefe, he was co-editor of a multi-volume manual on ophthalmology titled Handbuch der gesammten Augenheilkunde.

== Associated eponyms ==
- "Saemisch's ulcer": a serpiginous corneal ulcer; ulcus serpens corneae.
- "Saemisch's operation": An operation for hypopyon ulcer.

== Written works ==
- Klinische Beobachtungen aus der Augenheilanstalt in Wiesbaden. With Arnold Pagenstecher (1837-1913) and Alexander Pagenstecher. two booklets, Wiesbaden, 1861-1862.
- Beiträge zur normalen und pathologischen Anatomie des Auges, Leipzig, 1862.
- Handbuch der gesammten Augenheilkunde (by Edwin Theodor Saemisch and Alfred Carl Graefe).
  - First edition, (17 volumes) from 1874 to 1889.
  - Second edition, (15 volumes in 41) 1899-1918.
  - Third edition, from 1912.
- Das Ulcus corneae serpens und seine Therapie; eine klinische Studie. Bonn, 1870.
