= Alexander Pagenstecher (zoologist) =

German zoologist (1825–1889)

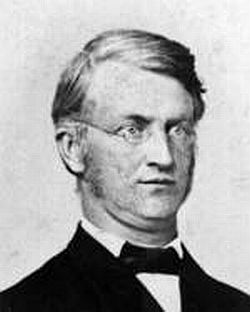
Heinrich Alexander Pagenstecher

Heinrich Alexander Pagenstecher (18 March 1825, Elberfeld – 4 January 1889, Hamburg) was a German surgeon and zoologist. He studied invertebrates, particularly the trematodes.

== Life and work ==
Pagenstecher was born in Elberfeld, the son of medical doctor Carl Heinrich (1799-1869) and Julie (1802-1872) née Jung. He studied medicine at the universities of Göttingen, Heidelberg and Berlin and furthered his education in Paris. Following graduation, he worked as a general practitioner in his hometown of Elberfeld (1847), as a spa doctor in Salzbrunn (1848–49) and as a physician in Barmen (1849). In 1856 he obtained his habilitation for obstetrics at the University of Heidelberg.

Because of a serious injury to two of his fingers while practicing surgery, he considered himself unfit for surgery and obstetrics, and subsequently shifted his attention from medicine to zoology. In 1863, following the death of Heinrich Georg Bronn (1800–62), he was named an associate professor of zoology and paleontology as well as director of the zoological institute at Heidelberg, where in 1866, he attained a full professorship. In 1882 he was appointed director of the Natural History Museum in Hamburg. He studied trematodes, mites, parasitic worms, pearl production in mussels and wrote a four volume treatise on the development of organisms Allgemeine Zoologie oder Grundgesetze des thierischen Baues und Lebens (1875-1881).

He married Eugine Aders (1829-1882) in 1850 and after her death he married Maria Olga Schwartze (1854–1928). The skink species Pseudemoia pagenstecheri (southern grass tussock skink) is named in his honor.

== Selected works ==
- Trematodenlarven und Trematoden : helminthologischer Beitrag, 1857 – Trematode larvae and trematodes, a helminthological contribution.
- Untersuchungen über niedere Seetiere, 1858 (with Rudolf Leuckart); translated into English and published as "Researches upon some of the lower marine animals" (1859).
- Beiträge zur Anatomie der Milben (2 volumes, 1860–61) – Contributions to the anatomy of the mite.
- Die ungeschlechtliche Vermehrung der Fliegenlarven, 1864 – Asexual propagation of fly larvae.
- Die Trichinen; nach Versuchen im Auftrage des Grossherzoglich Badischen Handelsministeriums ausgeführt am Zoologischen Institute in Heidelberg, 1866 (with Christian Joseph Fuchs) – Trichinosis; according to tests on behalf of the Grand Duchy of Baden Department of Commerce executed at the Zoological Institute in Heidelberg.
- Allgemeine zoologie, oder Grundgesetze des thierischen baus und lebens (4 volumes, 1875–81) – General zoology; basic laws of animal structure and life.
