= Vittoria Caldoni =

Italian artists' model

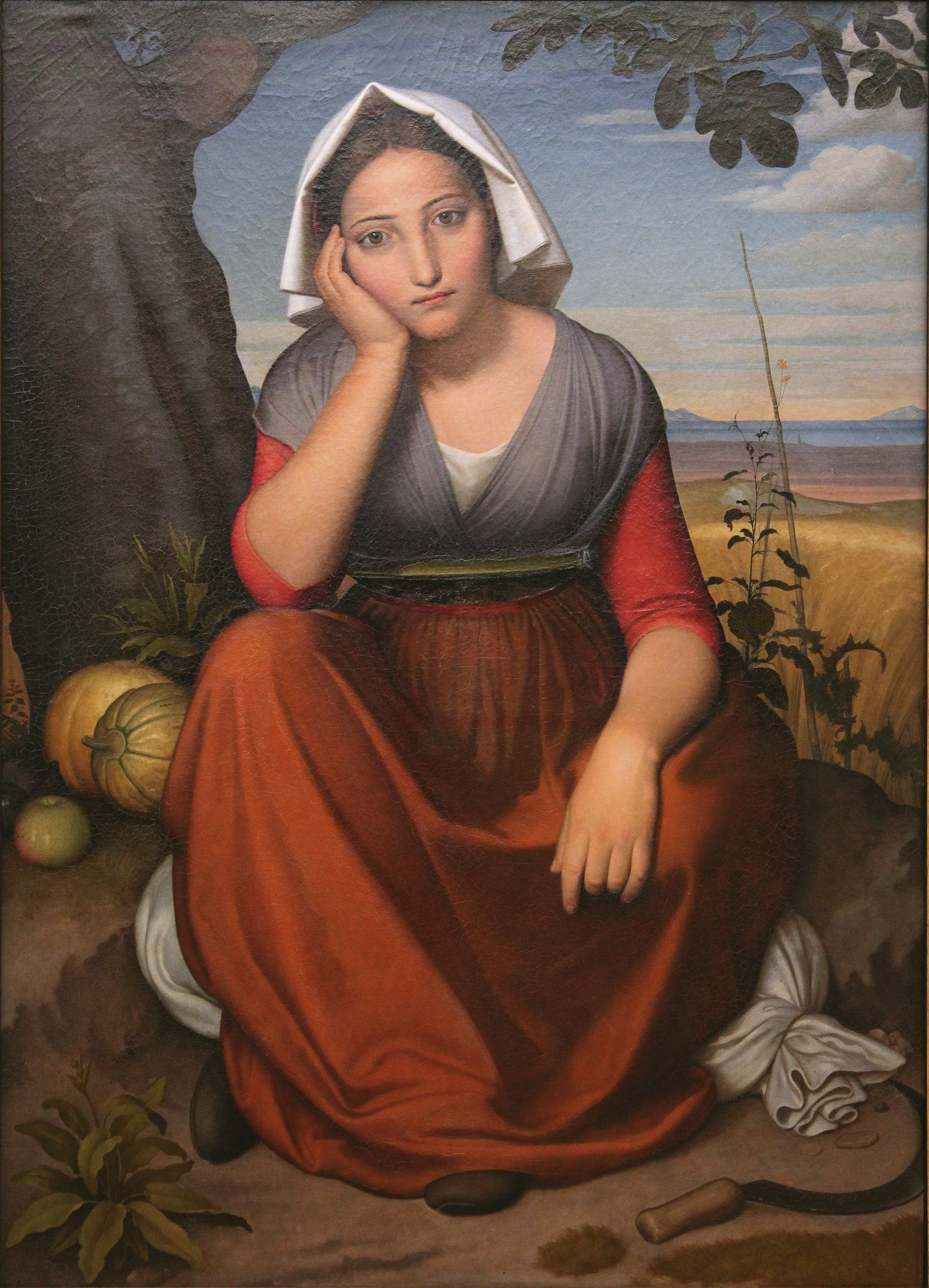
Portrait by Friedrich Overbeck

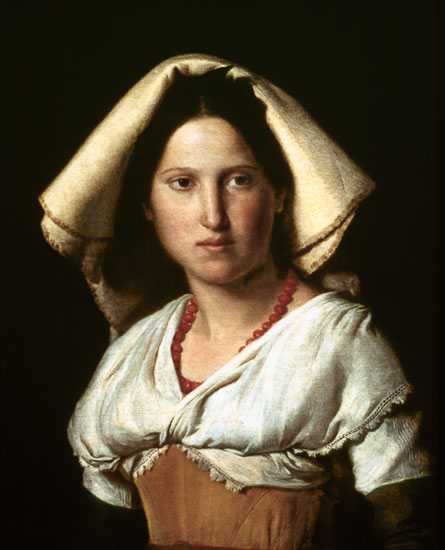
Portrait by Victor Orsel

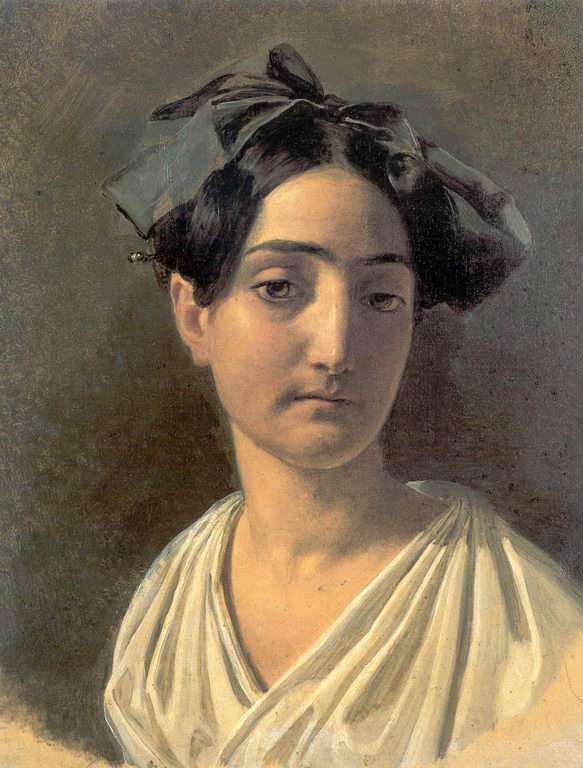
Portrait by Alexander Ivanov

Vittoria Candida Rosa Caldoni (6 March 1805 in Albano Laziale – 1872?/1890? in Russia) was an Italian artists' model. She was the most popular model among the German artists residing in Rome in the early nineteenth-century; especially those associated with the Nazarene movement. Over 100 paintings with her image have survived.

== Life ==
She was the sixth of nine children born to a winemaking family, and one of five that survived to adulthood. At the age of fifteen, she was "discovered" by August Kestner and was brought to Rome to work as a model. This proved to be very profitable for her family, enabling them to move into larger quarters and begin renting rooms to travelers; mostly artists.

One of their tenants was an aspiring Ukrainian painter named Grigory Ignatevich Lapchenko. She married him in 1839 and emigrated to Russia, where they apparently had at least one son. Grigory became seriously ill with an unspecified condition that affected his eyesight, so he had to give up his plans to become a painter and worked as a minor government official.

Her life in Russia was not well documented (which was common there at that time), so no reliable information exists regarding her date and place of death. It is assumed that her life there was mundane and financially difficult.

== Work as a model ==
Many artists considered her to be an ideal female figure. She was generally portrayed in local costume or allegorical garb, often with attributes that referred to representations of the Madonna.

The exact number of paintings she sat for is unknown and many were destroyed, especially during World War II. There are also a few portrait busts. Complicating matters is the fact that many images of her were not done from life. A portrait of her by Pablo Picasso is an obvious example of this.

Among the artists who are known to have engaged her services as a model, one may mention:

- Ernst von Bandel
- Carl Joseph Begas
- Carl Blechen
- Franz Ludwig Catel
- Peter von Cornelius
- Marie Ellenrieder
- Joseph von Führich
- August Grahl
- Wilhelm Hensel
- Heinrich Maria von Hess
- Peter von Hess
- Franz Horny
- Woldemar Hottenroth
- Auguste Hüssener
- Alexander Andreyevich Ivanov
- Paul Emil Jacobs
- Wilhelm von Kaulbach
- August Kestner
- Eduard Magnus
- Friedrich Mosbrugger
- Michael Neher
- Theobald von Oer
- Carl Oesterley
- Moritz Oppenheim
- Friedrich Overbeck
- Friedrich Preller the Elder
- Johann Anton Ramboux
- Theodor Rehbenitz
- August Riedel
- Johann Scheffer von Leonhardshoff
- Julius Schnorr von Carolsfeld
- Julius Schoppe
- Joseph Anton Settegast
- Erwin Speckter
- Franz Seraph Stirnbrand
- Franz Xaver Stöber
- Pietro Tenerani
- Bertel Thorvaldsen
- Horace Vernet
- Carl Christian Vogel von Vogelstein
- Karl Wilhelm Wach
- Friedrich Wasmann
- Theodor Leopold Weller
- Franz Xaver Winterhalter

== Further reading and sources ==
- Rita Giuliani: Vittoria Caldoni Lapčenko. La «fanciulla di Albano» nell'arte, nell'estetica e nella letteratura russa (The "Girl of Albano" in Art, Aesthetics and Russian Literature), Gangemi (2013) ISBN 88-492-2465-6
- Amrei I. Gold: Der Modellkult um Sarah Siddons, Emma Hamilton, Vittoria Caldoni und Jane Morris - Ikonographische Analyse und Werkkatalog. Dissertation. University of Münster (2009).
- Ulrike Koeltz: Vittoria Caldoni – Modell und Identifikationsfigur des 19 Jahrhunderts, in the "Europäische Hochschulschriften Reihe XXVIII – Kunstgeschichte". Vol.436. Frankfurt (2010). ISBN 978-3-631-59944-0
