= Fohr (surname) =

Fohr or Föhr is a German surname that may refer to the following notable people:

- Alexander Föhr (born 1980), German politician
- Anja Seibert-Fohr (born 1969), German jurist
- Daniel Fohr (1801–1862), German painter
- Haley Fohr (born 1988), American vocalist, composer, and singer-songwriter who releases music under the names Circuit Des Yeux and Jackie Lynn
- Karl Philipp Fohr (1795–1818), German painter, brother of Daniel
- Myron Fohr (1912–1994), American racecar driver
- Robert Fohr (born 1954), French art historian, translator and author
- Tero Föhr (born 1980), Finnish orienteering competitor
