= Karl Philipp Fohr =

German painter (1795–1818)

- Born: November 26, 1795; Heidelberg
- Died: June 29, 1818 (aged 22); Rome
- Cause of death: Drowning in the River Tiber
- Resting place: Protestant Cemetery, Rome
- Education: Academy of Fine Arts, Munich
- Known for: Landscape painting, watercolor, portrait drawing

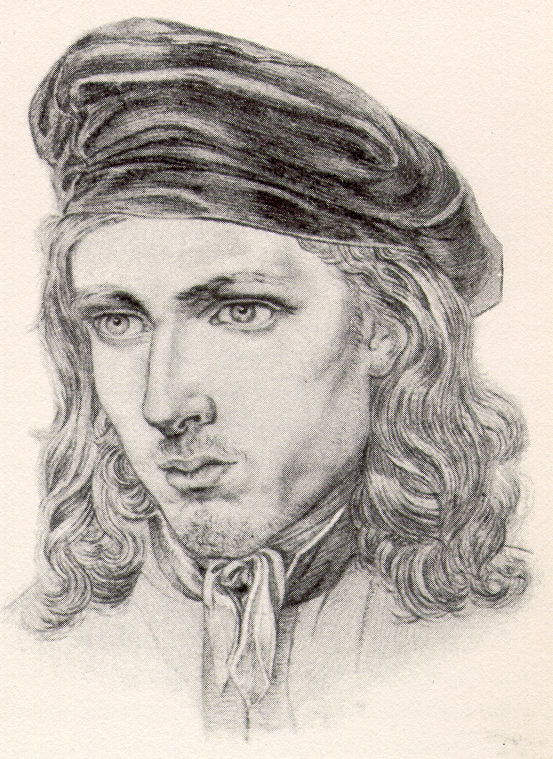
Portrait of Fohr by Carl Johann Barth, c. 1817

Karl Philipp Fohr (26 November 1795 – 29 June 1818), a brother of Daniel Fohr, was a German painter, born at Heidelberg in 1795.

== Life and education ==
Fohr started his studies of painting with Friedrich Rottmann, and was largely self-taught. In 1810 he was discovered by the painter Georg Wilhelm Issel, who invited him to Darmstadt in 1811. There, his future biographer Johann Philipp Dieffenbach introduced him to the grand-ducal court at Darmstadt and to Princess Wilhelmine of Baden, who acted as a patron, placed small orders from him, and offered him later an annual salary. While hiking through the Odenwald and the valley of the river Neckar, Fohr executed a serial of preliminary sketches to the watercolors for the Skizzenbuch der Neckargegend, which was finalized in the winter of 1813/14 and dedicated to Princess Wilhelmine, offering pittoresque views, historical and fairy-tale subjects of the region. In 1814, he was part of Princess Wilhelmine's convoy to her summer-resort to the spa town of Baden-Baden. The Badisches Skizzenbuch, commissioned by Princess Wilhelmine, was a result of his tours through the Black Forest, containing pittoresque views e.g. of Kloster Lichtenthal, the burial place of the Margraves of Baden.

It was with Princess Wilhelmine's thereupon granted scholarship that Fohr went to Munich to study at the Academy of Fine Arts from July 1815 to May 1816. There he became friends with fellow student Ludwig Sigismund Ruhl, from whom he learned the basics of oil-painting. In autumn 1815 he hiked through Tyrol to Venice. From May to October 1816 Fohr had a stop in Heidelberg where he came in contact to a circle of political engaged students.

== Rome ==
When Fohr dropped out of the academy of Munich to travel on foot to northern Italy, and arrived in Rome in 1816, he briefly joined the circles of the Nazarenes and the Deutsch-Römer. In Rome, where Fohr increasingly developed his own style, he shared a studio with the landscape painter Joseph Anton Koch, whose heroic Italian landscapes influenced his own works. Like many of the Nazarenes, Deutsch-Römer, Lukasbrüder (as a sub-group of the Nazarenes was called Lukasbund ), and other northern artists and writers in Rome, he frequented the Caffè Greco – many of them twice a day or more: in 1817 for example, 82 German artists stayed in Rome, a record says. By the end of the year 1817, Fohr started with single portrait drawings as preparation for his renowned group portrait of the artists in Rome at the Caffè Greco, which belongs to his most important works and is one of the most important contributions to the romantic cult of friendship, which arose around 1800. First approach in developing the group portrait were, as Wilhelm Schlink has widely discussed, two designs of the composition in its entirety (Frankfurt am Main, Städel Museum). Single portrait studies followed (lots of them in Heidelberg, Kurpfälzisches Museum), among them portraits of fellow artists like Peter Cornelius, Johann Friedrich Overbeck, Theodor Rehbenitz, Philipp Veit, the copperplate engraver and draftsman Carl Johann Barth, or the architect Johannes Buck, but also the admired landscape painter and teacher Joseph Anton Koch, the landscape painter Martin von Rohden, the architect Kaspar Waldmann, the poet and writer Friedrich Rückert, and not least Fohr himself. Although Fohr obviously intended to depict the crowd of artists that gathered in the Caffé Greco, the design should not – with respect to the cult of friendship mentioned above – be considered as a snap-shot or a realistic impression. Fohr was actually more a landscape painter than a portraitist. Whatever the intention of the group portrait was, maybe a copper engraving to be sold to friends and colleagues, the project was stopped by Fohr's tragic death. On 29 June 1818 Fohr drowned whilst bathing in the river Tiber with his friends Carl Johann Barth, Johann Anton Ramboux, and Samuel Amsler. To raise funds for a monument in his memory, they created a print after a drawing of Fohr by Barth. Samuel Amsler produced the print, as Barth was too distressed to make the print himself. Fohr is buried in the Protestant Cemetery in Rome.

== Legacy ==
Despite his premature death Fohr left an impressive oeuvre (see catalogue raisonnée), which includes around 800 drawings, watercolors, and prints, but only seven paintings, predominantly preserved in Frankfurt am Main, Städel Museum, and in Darmstadt Hessisches Landesmuseum.

== See also ==
- List of German painters
- (in Italian) The waterfalls of Tivoli
- (in Italian) Ancient Greek Coffee

== Selected works ==
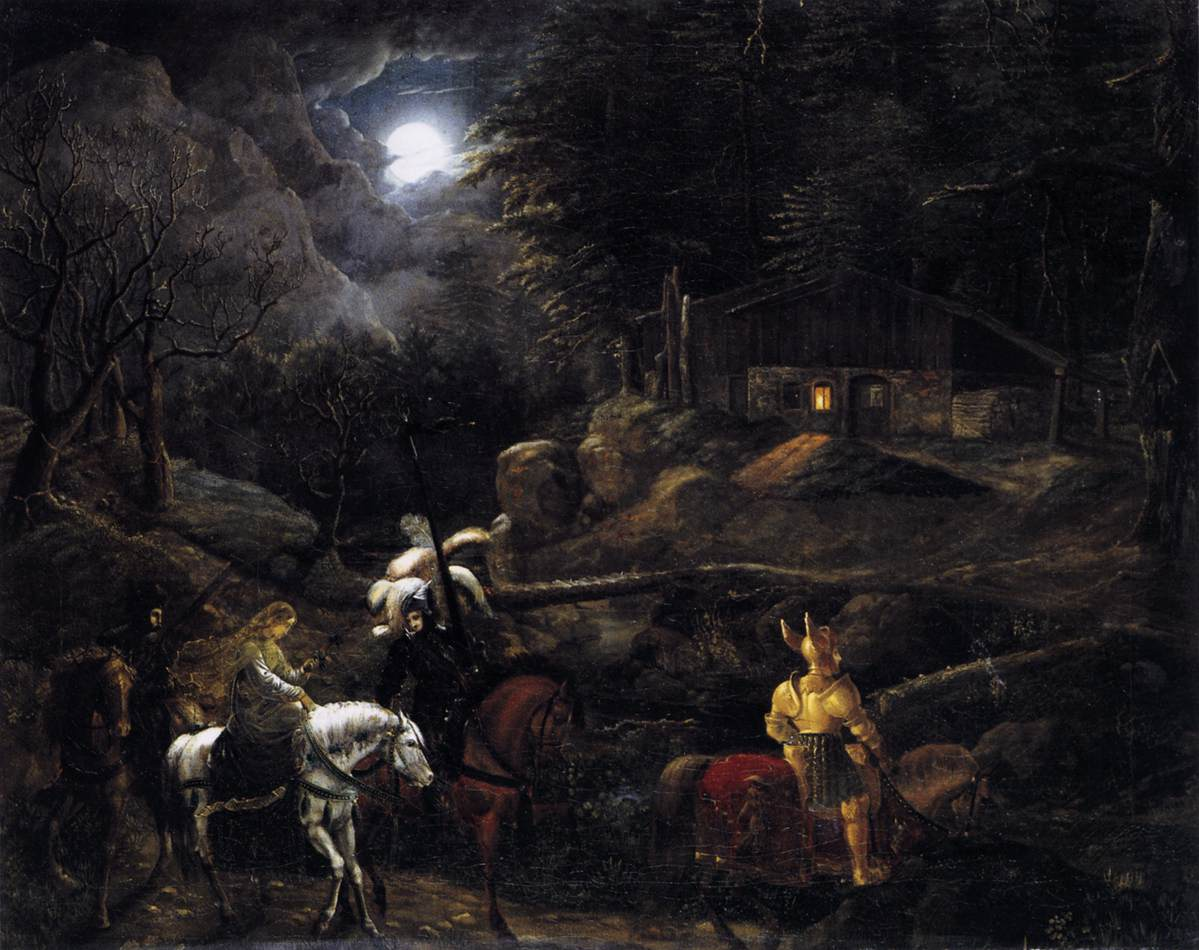
Knight before the Charcoal Burner's Hut, 1816, now in the Alte Nationalgalerie

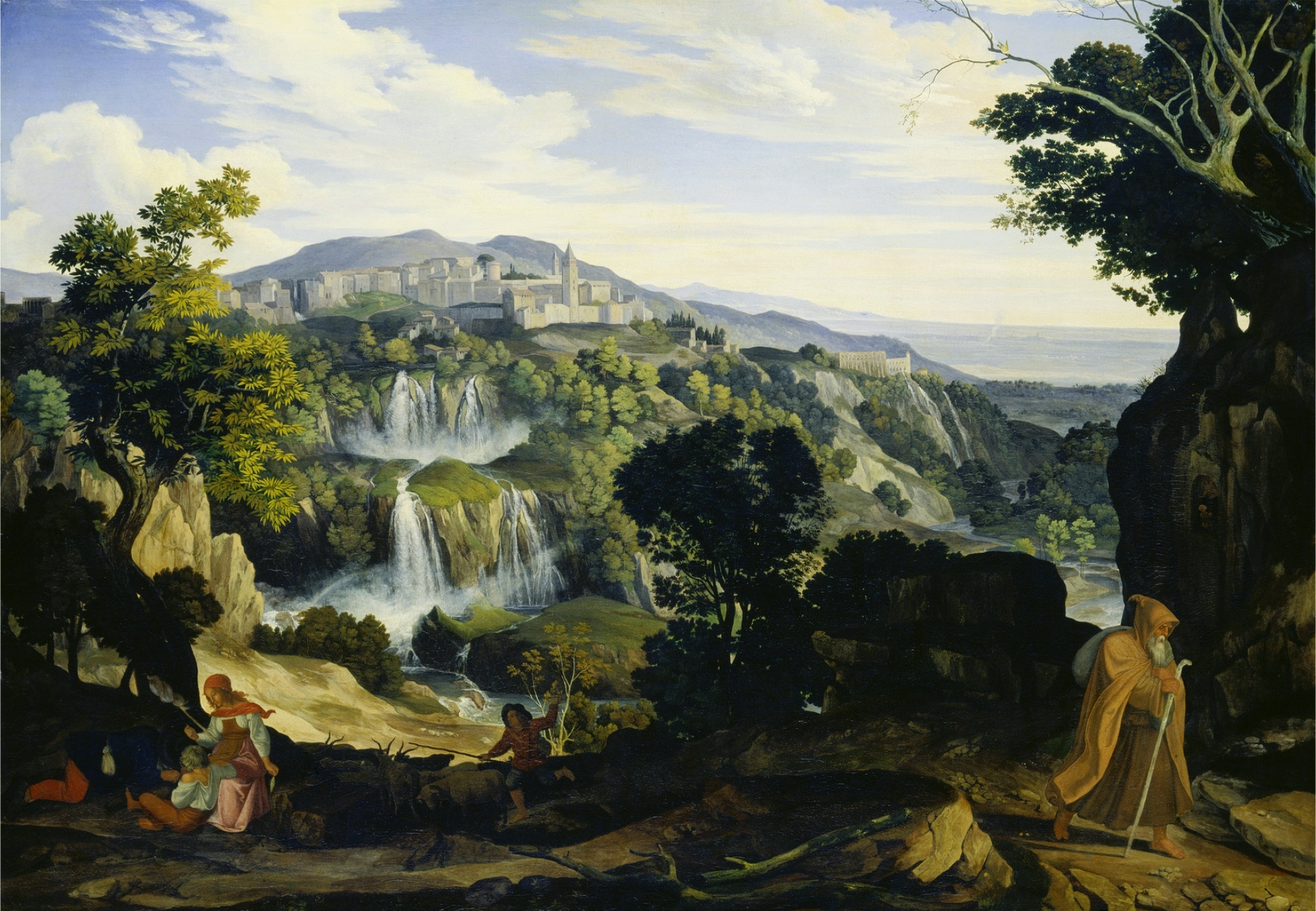
The Waterfalls of Tivoli

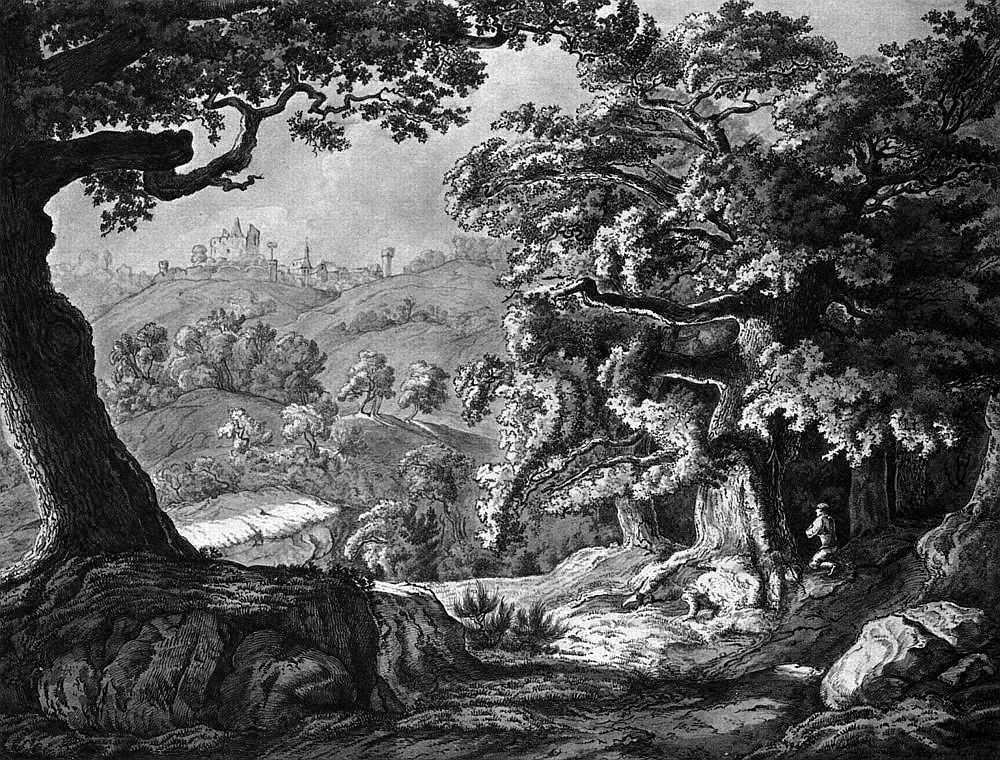
Lindenfels, 1812, drawing

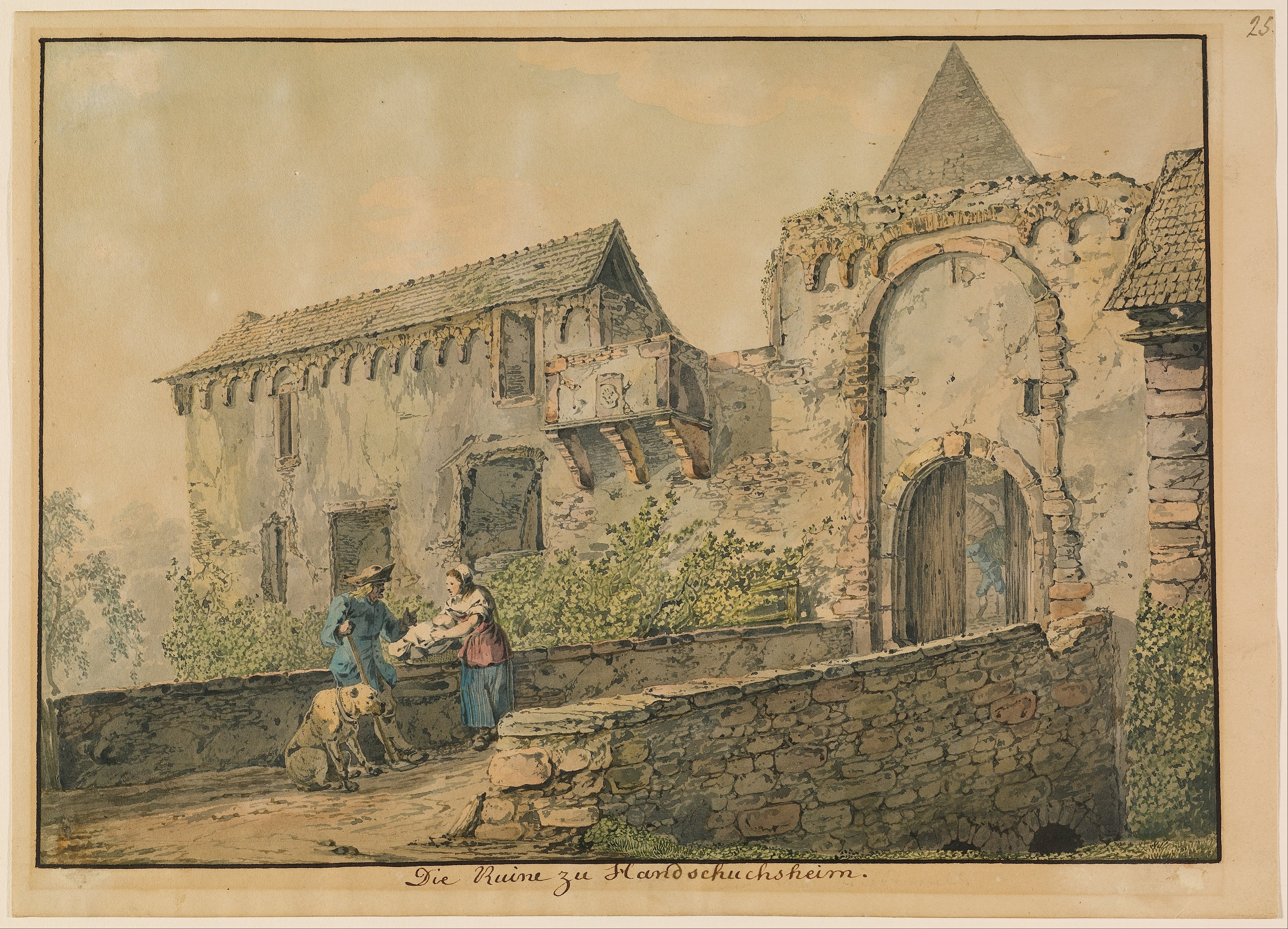
Ruin of the Tiefburg at Handschuhsheim, 1813-1814, watercolor over graphite, now in the J. Paul Getty Museum

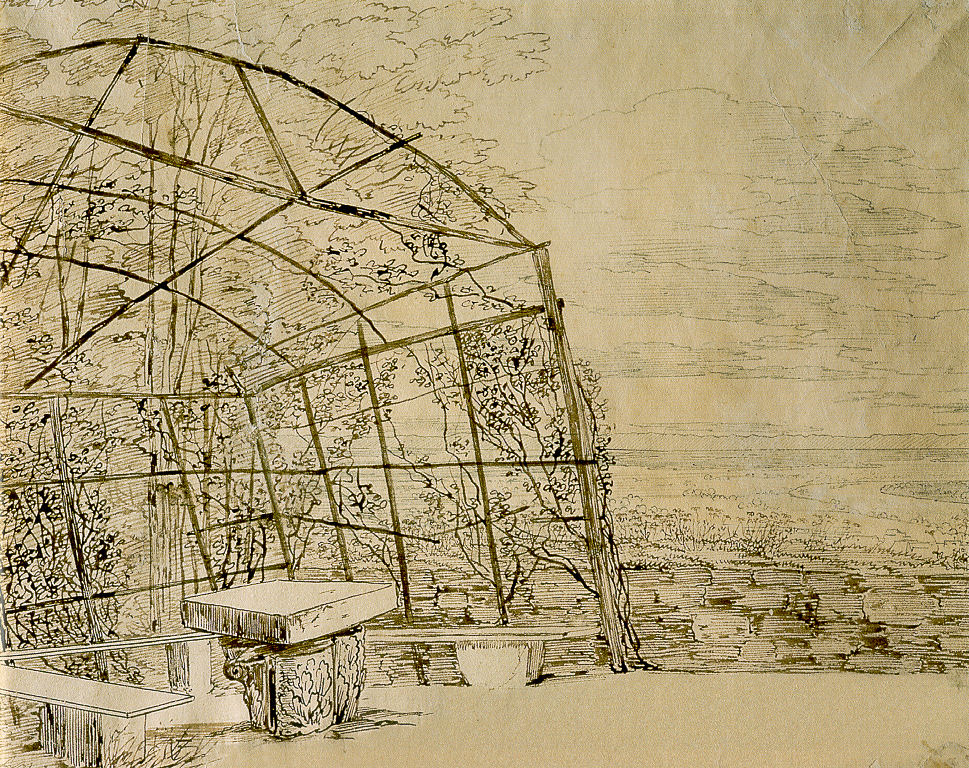
Summer house and stone table in the English Garden of Heidelberg Castle, before 1816

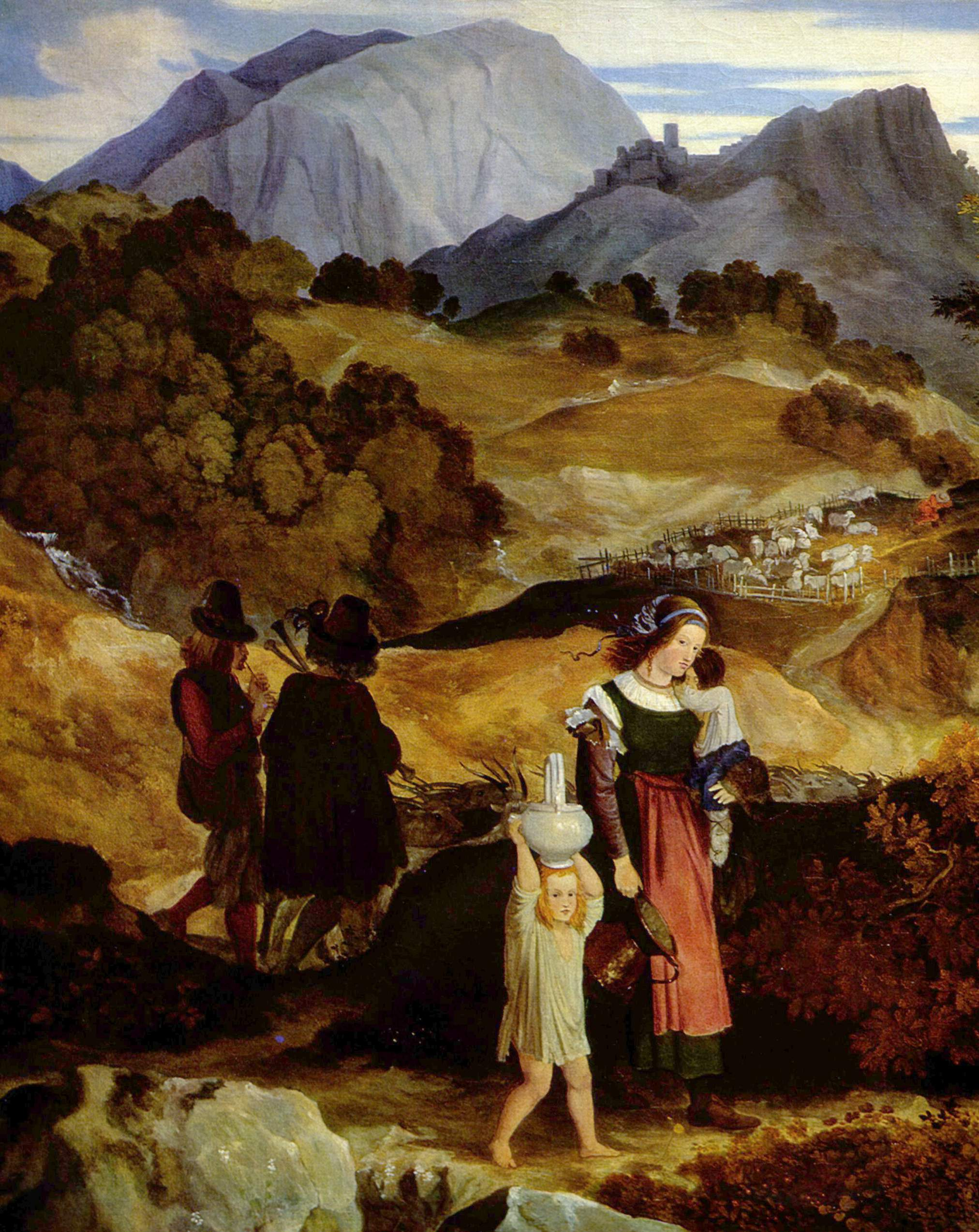
Landscape near Subiaco, 1817, now in the Schlossmuseum Darmstadt

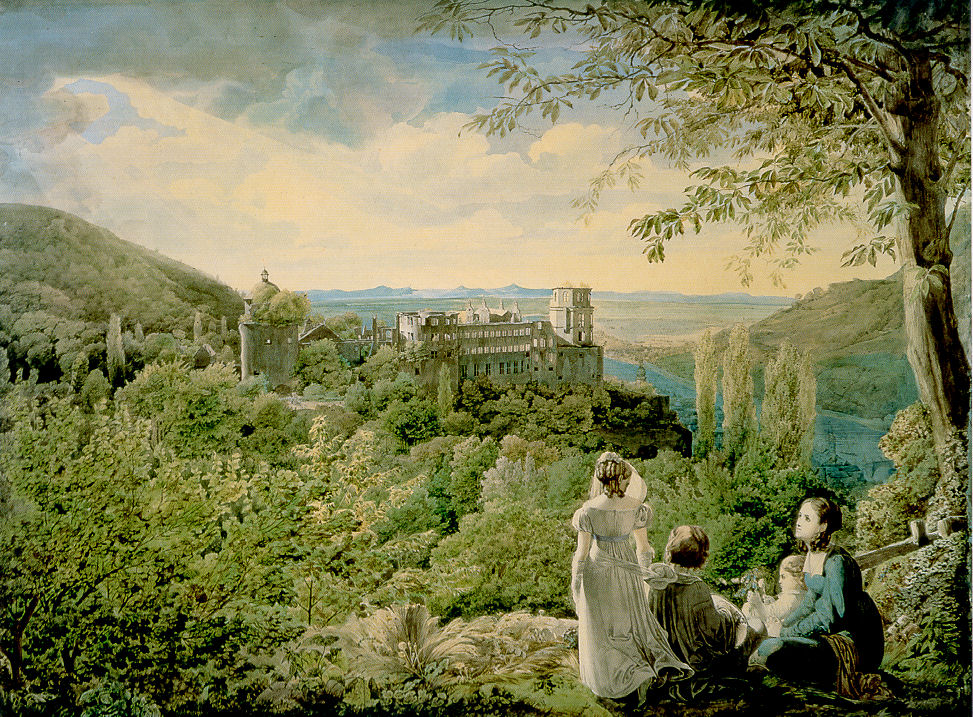
Heidelberg Castle
