= Fohr =

Fohr may refer to

- Föhr, a North Frisian island, in Nordfriesland, Germany
- Wyk auf Föhr, a town on Föhr
- Föhr-Land, a municipality in Nordfriesland, Germany
- Föhr North Frisian, a North Frisian dialect spoken on Föhr
- Fohr (surname)
