= Gui Rochat =

American art dealer (born 1933)

Gui Rochat (Guillaume Frédéric Rochat, born 1933) is an international private art dealer and consultant, dealing primarily in 17th- and 18th-century French paintings and drawings. He works from New York as "Gui Rochat Old Masters". His experience with four art auction houses, Sotheby's, Phillips, Son & Neale, Butterfields (now Bonhams) and Doyle New York, led him to prevent multiple Old Master paintings from being destroyed.

== Early life and education ==
Listed in the Who is Who in the East 1986/7, Rochat was born in 1933 on Java (then the Dutch East Indies) to parents Dr. Guillaume Frédéric Rochat and attorney Bertha Rochat. He is a descendent of Antoine de Bourgogne (1421-1504), who was painted by Rogier van der Weyden and Hans Memling.

Gui Rochat was educated at the Latin and Greek Gymnasium school in Zwolle, The Netherlands from 1946 to 1953, after which he entered the Dutch navy's training program for reserve lieutenant. He was briefly a cadet in the Dutch Naval Academy before beginning to study medicine at Groningen University in 1956. His parents, who were living then in Iran, then transferred him to the American University of Beirut, Lebanon, where he graduated in 1960 with a degree in experimental psychology. This enabled him to continue his graduate studies at Indiana University, where he met his wife Katherine McCollum. They have one child, Corinne Elise Alexandra.

== Professional career in the Fine Arts ==
After completing a training program at Sotheby's in New York City, Rochat became the director for the South-East and went to Houston, Texas, from 1970 to 1971, where he ran Sotheby's gallery in the Galleria Post Oak. He sold several Post-Impressionist paintings that now form part of the Beck and Law Collections in the Houston Museum. Thereafter, he trained in the Old Master and 19th Century painting departments at Sotheby's, London, after which he entered their Old Master painting department in New York until 1974. He joined Philips, Son & Neale in 1979 as the Fine Art consultant and became president in 1981 at the Rhinelander mansion on Madison Avenue. During this time, he catalogued the fine art from the estate of Elizabeth Fuller Chapman.

He was given a solo exhibition of his private European art glass collection in the New Orleans Museum of Art in 1986 and was invited to write an article on a recently acquired large portrait of Louis XVI, an autograph version of the Versailles portrait by the painter Antoine-François Callet. In 1989, he was appointed director of Fine Arts at Butterfield & Butterfield in San Francisco where he then became its vice-president in 1990. There, he appraised the fine art in the Elise S. Haas estate, now in the Museum of Modern Art in San Francisco, which included a 1905 portrait of his wife by Matisse, Matisse's portraits of Leo and Sarah Stein, and the sculpture "La Négresse Blanche" by Brâncuși. Rochat also catalogued the fine art in the estate of composer Edgard Varèse and Louise Varèse.

Rochat discovered works by such artists as Giorgio de Chirico, Yves Tanguy, Pierre Soulages and Amedeo Modigliani, previously hidden in Western collections. From 2005 to 2006, he was a Fine Arts consultant at Doyle NewYork, where he discovered a drawing by Egon Schiele, now in the Neue Galerie New York, and a small panel by Joaquín Sorolla y Bastida, circa 1900, of the beach at San Sebastián, with the image of his wife in the foreground.

== Private career in the Fine Arts ==
Gui Rochat discovered multiple disappeared and unrecognized Old Master paintings and drawings during his activities as a private Old Master painting and drawing dealer.

Examples of these are two canvases by the French-Italian master Michele Desubleo, both now illustrated in color in the catalogue raisonné of his work, one of which had already been recorded as lost, mentioned in his testament (cf Thieme Becker and Milantoni). He also discovered an oil-on-paper study for an unknown altar painting of the Martyrdom of Saint Bartholomew by Antoine Rivalz, acquired by the Musée des Augustins in Toulouse, France, also fully illustrated and described in the catalogue raisonné on the artist.

Rochat found a pair of red chalk drawings by François Boucher, after a painting by Francesco Solimena, that formed part of the collection of Cardinal Fesch, the uncle of Napoleon. It is now housed in the cardinal's museum palace in Ajaccio, Corsica. They proved that Boucher had stopped in Venice on his voyage to Italy, around 1730, where the Solimena work was then still hanging in the Baglioni collection. These drawings are now both in Ajaccio.

The National Gallery of Scotland acquired a rediscovered oil sketch of a young woman in profile by the Flemish artist François-Joseph Navez, a pupil of Jacques-Louis David. In 2008, the Montreal Museum of Fine Arts bought a small oil-on-copper painting of the Virgin and Christ by Frér Luc, a Canadian artist and French monk who entered a Quebec monastery in the late 17th century.

He later discovered a drawing preparatory for an engraving by Claudine Bouzonnet-Stella, the niece of the French artist Jacques Stella, who was a close friend of Nicolas Poussin when both worked in Italy. Stella had bought a painting by Poussin of Venus giving arms to Aeneas, which is now in the museum in Rouen.

Gui Rochat discovered a work for a collector in New York by the Dutch artist Abraham Bloemaert, fully signed and dated 1624. It was offered by Sotheby's New York. The painting was sold to a private collector in New York, who subsequently sold it to the National Gallery in London. The Rijksmuseum in Amsterdam acquired a drawing in red chalk of a young woman looking at an engraving, recognized as by the 18th-century Dutch artist Gijsbertus van der Berg.

Among the most recent discoveries is a small oil-on-copper work by the Baroque French artist Jacques de Létin of Saint Catherine of Alexandria, which is now in the Musee des Beaux-Arts in Troyes, France, and The Calling of Saint James the Greater by Claude-Guy Hallé.

Recently was sold to a Paris collection an Allegory of Venus with Eros and Anteros by French artist Charles Poerson (1609–1667), a painting that lacked attribution though it was sold in Sotheby Monaco in 1994 and stayed in a major Italian collection as by an unknown French 17th century painter. It was on loan to the Los Angeles County Museum of Art in 2013.

More recently was discovered a large Penitent Saint Dominic, which is now in a Paris collection and described by Robert Fohr in his 2018 book on Georges de La Tour. He received for this book the Marmottan prize from the Paris Academy of Fine Arts. Fohr describes the painting as a possible copy from a late work by Georges de La Tour.

A beautiful portrait of supposedly his mother by Joseph Ducreux was given to the New Orleans Museum of Art. It is thought to have been painted by him when he was about 20 years old and a pupil of the pastelist Quentin de La Tour. A painting of the composition of Venus Castigating Amor, attributed to Claude Mellan, went to a Paris collection. A small oil-on-copper of Penitent Saint Magdalene, thought to be by Jacques de Bellange from around 1605 when working with the engraver Crispijn de Passe, is now in a Palm Beach collection. A Young Christ by Frére Luc is now owned by the community of Sezanne, France. And an image of Saint Catherine of Alexandria by Charles Poerson was sold to the Musee Georges de la Tour in Vic-sur-Seille, where the artist was born. This painting went through Christie’s New York and Artcurial in Paris without being recognized.

== Associations and references in literature ==
Gui Rochat has been a member of the Société de l’Histoire de l’Art français since 1997

Alliance française, The Netherlands, First prize 1951 article on France.

Philips, New York, "The Collection of the late Elizabeth Fuller Chapman", March 3, 1981

Times Picayune, New Orleans, Louisiana, Fine Arts editor "A small and significant exhibition of a private collection of European Art Glass" at the Delgado Museum, May 17, 1986.

Gui Rochat, "Antoine-François Callet, Portrait of Louis XVI", article in the Arts Quarterly bulletin of the New Orleans Museum of Art for the 3rd quarter1987.

Felicity Mason/Anne Cumming, The Love Quest, London: Peter Owen, 1991

Rijksmuseum, Amsterdam, the Netherlands bulletin, summer 1997, number 3, p. 239

La Revue du Louvre et des Musées de France, December 1999, p. 77, number 12

La Revue du Louvre et des Musées de France, December 2000, p. 82, numbers 18 and 19.

La Tribune de l’Art, internet publication, France, several times, 2004–present

Alberto Cottino, "Michele Desubleo, a catalogue raisonné", Turin 2001, color illus. XXXI, p. 123, number 57 and p. 85, color illus. XXXIV, p. 128, number 64

Beverley Schreiber Jacoby, "Early drawings by François Boucher", PhD thesis, p. 247, numbers II B 3 and II B 4

Beverley Schreiber Jacoby, "François Boucher", Master Drawings, 2001, vol. 39, number 3

Edgard Munhall. Greuze the draftsman, Frick Collection, 2002, p. 8

Denis Coekelberghs, ‘Schnetz, Géricault ?, Navez tout simplement’, Gazette des beaux-arts, February 2002, p. 282

Alastair Laing, The Drawings of François Boucher, Frick Collection, 2003, p. 9

Françoise Jolie & Jean-François Méjanes,’François Boucher, hier et aujourd’hui’, publ. Louvre, 2003/4, pp. 46–48, entries 14 and 15, illus. in color

Jean Pénent, ‘Antoine Rivalz, le Romain de Toulouse’, Toulouse 2004, p. 43 illus. in color, p. 47, pp. 144–145, number 43, illus. in color

Denis Coekelberghs, "Les peintres Belges à Rome aux XVIIIe et XIXe siècles", note 100, p. 283

Denis Coekelberghs, "Lettres d’Alexandre Bénard à François-Joseph Navez", Les Cahiers d’Histoire de l’Art, 2006, illus. in color p. 94, fig. 6, note 70, p. 117

Dr. Alfred Bader, Chemistry and Art, Further Adventures of a Chemist Collector, London: Weidenfeld, 2008, pp. 84–86, "Bloemaert, Lot and His Daughters", p. 87, illus. in color pl. 35

Paola Bassani Pacht, Pierre Brebiette, Neptune calmant la tempete, Galerie Alexis Bordes, Paris, November 2014.

Alexandra Zvereva, Le Gout Francais, Galerie Alexis Bordes, Paris, November 2015 (Charles Poerson)

Robert Fohr, Georges de La Tour, le maître des nuits, Cohen & Cohen, Paris, 2018, full page color illustration and description on pages 254, 255, number 80 and page 310. ("D’après Georges de La Tour, Saint Dominique en prière devant un crucifix, huile sur toile, 101 x 81 cm. En haut ȧ gauche, blason de l’Ordre des Dominicains. New York, Gui Rochat").

== Notes ==
- Didier Rykner, "Nouvelles Brèves – Acquisitions – Edimbourg, National Gallery of Scotland", La Tribune de l’Art, 25/6/04
- Sylvain Kerspern, "Retour sur l’exposition Bossuet, suite: du nouveau pour Prévost et Licherie", La Tribune de l’Art, 12/11/04
- Sylvain Kerspern, "Le Brun enigmatique, Le Supplice de Mezence, enjeux d'une esquisse"
- Didier Rykner, "Un important Vouet italien inédit refait surface dans une vente aux enchères américaine", La Tribune de l’Art, 18/9/06
- Didier Rykner, "Réapparition du morceasu d’agrément d’Antoine Callet", La Tribune de l’Art, 14/11/07
- Denis Coekelberghs, François-Joseph Navez. "Quelques nouveaux tableaux, dessins et autres documents", La Tribune de l’Art, 29/2/08
- Didier Rykner, "Tableaux récemment acquis par le Musée des Beaux-Arts de Montréal", La Tribune de l’Art, 17/4/08
- "Un nouveau Jacques de Létin pour le Musée des Beaux-Arts de Troyes", La Tribune de l’Art, 16/7/13
- Beverly Schreiber Jacoby, ‘Newly discovered early chalk drawings by Boucher’, Master Drawings, Vol. 39, no. 3 (Autumn, 2001), pp. 300–306 “I would like to thank Gui Rochat, New York, for bringing these studies to my attention and Jean-Marc. Olivesi, conservator at the Musee Fesch, for providing me… etc."
- Marion Maneker, Art Market Monitor, December 15, 2010, Poussin Post Mortem’ “On the other hand, New York Old Masters dealer Gui Rochat thought quality might have had something to do with the Poussin result, calling the picture “not terribly appealing.”"
- Jérôme Montcouquiol, ‘Quelques petits format de Frère Luc’ (1614-1685), La Tribune de l’Art, June 9, 2012, « La galerie Gui Rochat à New York présente actuellement un petit cuivre représentant Saint Guillaume d’Aquitaine (ill. 17), qui a bénéficié d’une étude par Sylvain Kerspern »
- Didier Rykner, La Tribune de l’Art, November 18, 2007, ‘Reappearance of Antoine Callet’s morceau d’agrément’, « "Acknowledgements : Gui Rochat" »
- Ilona van Tuinen, edited by Arthur K. Wheelock, ‘Abraham Bloemaert, Loth and his Daughters, 1624’, The Leiden Collection, sale, Sotheby's, New York, 22 January 2004, no. 24, as attributed to Hendrick. "Bloemaert to Dr. Alfred Bader, Milwaukee and Gui Rochat, New York;"
- Doyle, New York, January 26, 2011, lot 79 Lot 79: Antoine Coypel French, 1661-1722 The Judgment of Solomon Oil on canvas 45 x 57 inches (114.3 x 144.8 cm), "We also wish to thank Gui Rochat for identifying the composition."
- Paola Bassani Pacht, ‘Per un memoir su mio padre Giorgio Bassani’, April 26, 2011, « Anche Gui Rochat ha vissuto qualche anno a Roma ed è là che ha conosciuto mio padre. Robert Simon, infine, quando era etc. ».
- R.N. M. van Wijnen, ‘Lot en zijn Dochters’, proefschrift January 18, 2012, “Gui Rochat, Old Masters. Consultant Old Master Paintings and Dr. Bader beschrijft zijn ontdekking" in : A. Bader, Chemistry and Art, Further Adventures of a Chemist Collector, London 2008.” scriptie-Lot en zijn dochters Rominique van Wijnen (3).pdf
