= Kurpfälzisches Museum =

Museum in Heidelberg, Germany

Coordinates: 49°24′41″N 8°42′10″E

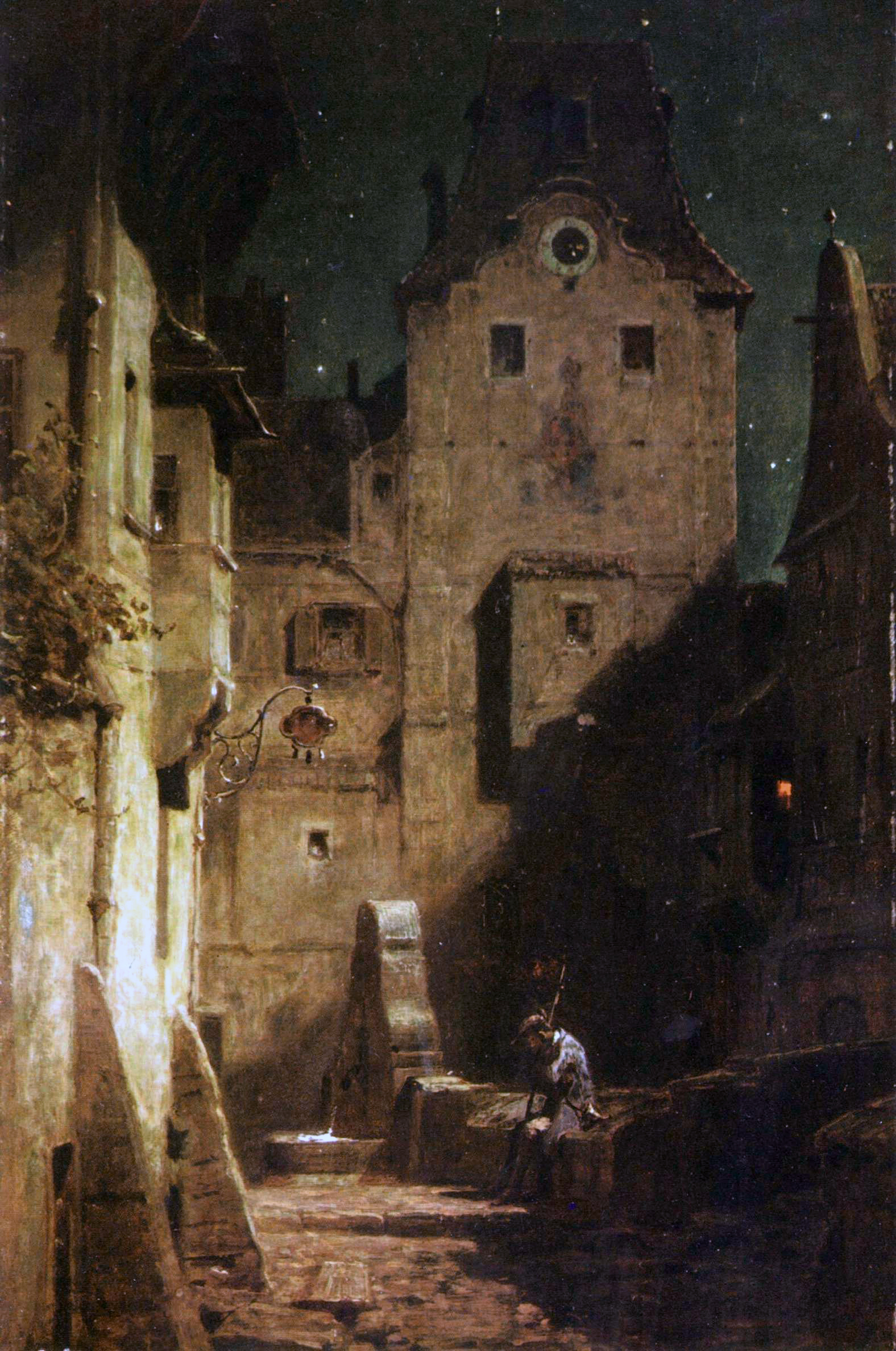
Carl Spitzweg: The Sleeping Night Watchman (c. 1875)

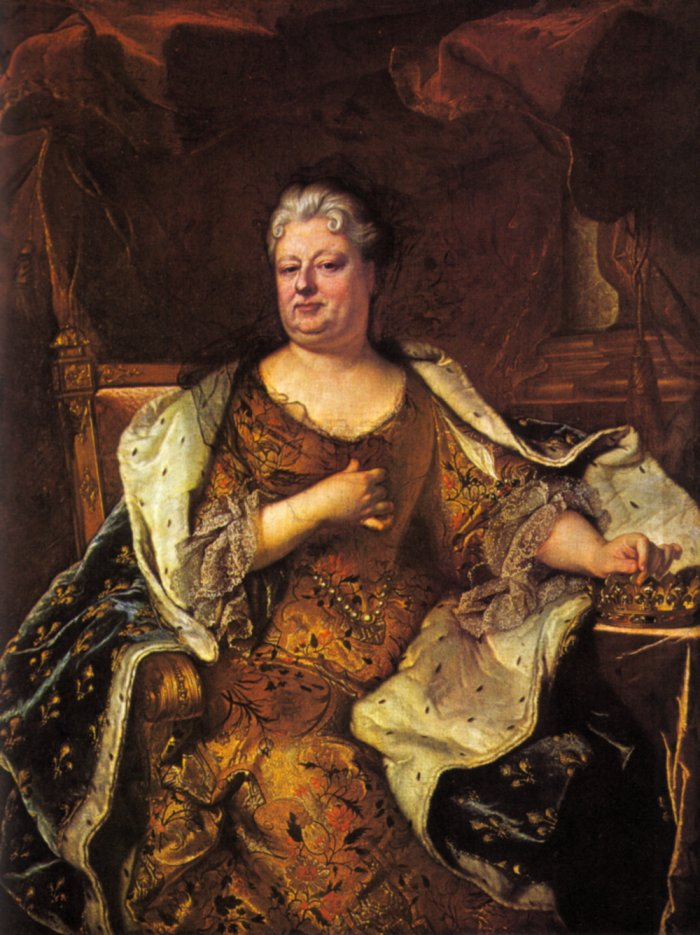
Hyacinthe Rigaud: Elizabeth Charlotte, Princess Palatine (1713)

The Kurpfälzisches Museum (Palatinate Museum) is a museum of art and archaeology in Heidelberg, Germany. It is located in the Palais Morass. It was founded in the late 1870s, when the city of Heidelberg purchased the private collection of the artist and art historian Charles de Graimberg.

== Collections ==
Archaeology

Findings from the Lower Neckar Valley, including a facsimile of the lower jaw of Homo heidelbergensis discovered in Mauer; Roman artefacts; a life-sized reconstruction of the mithraeum of Heidelberg; and items dating from Heidelberg's period as the Electoral Palatinate residence.

Paintings

Works from the 15th to the 20th century, including portraits of historic Heidelberg figures (Frederick V, Elizabeth Charlotte, Perkeo); religious works by Rogier van der Weyden and Lucas Cranach the Elder; 17th century Dutch still lifes; 18th century rococo pictures; 19th century works by Carl Rottmann, Anselm Feuerbach and Wilhelm Trübner; and 20th century works by Alexander Kanoldt, Alexei Jawlensky and Max Beckmann.

Graphic arts

7,000 watercolours and drawings, and just under 13,000 printed graphics, from the Middle Ages to the 20th century, including works by Peter Anton von Verschaffelt, Karl Philipp Fohr, Georg Schrimpf and Marc Chagall. Local artists are well represented, especially those from the Romantic period and the 20th century. Many of the older works provide historic representations of the city, the castle, and the former Palatinate. Works on paper are sensitive to light and cannot be put on permanent display.

Applied arts

The applied arts collection includes porcelain, coins, medallions, furniture and glassware. Four of the rooms have been furnished to recreate the 18th and 19th centuries, featuring for example Frankenthal porcelain and portraits of the prince-electors. There are also representative costumes of a Heidelberg family from around 1750 to 1930, and a household silver collection that once belonged to Countess Palatine Elisabeth Auguste (1721–1794).

Sculpture

Works from the 12th to the 20th century, including medieval gravestones from the former Augustine monastery, early baroque sculptures from houses in Heidelberg's old town, and sculptures of the Old Bridge, Prince-Elector Charles Theodore and the goddess Minerva. Two of the most important pieces are Tilman Riemenschneider's Altar of the Apostles (1509) and Wilhelm Lehmbruck's stone-cast Rückblickende.

Municipal history

Historical items, including the oldest stone relics from Heidelberg, a reconstructed kitchen from around 1600, models of the Old Bridge by the 18th century sculptor Linck, and a sequence of pictures by Ferdinand Kobell portraying the destruction of the bridge by floating ice in 1784. There is also a model of the medieval core of the old town.

Max Berk Textile Collection

Belonging to the museum's applied arts department, but displayed separately in a former evangelical church, this collection includes women's costumes going back to the second half of the 18th century, along with accessories, everyday items and decorative textile objects. There are also artefacts from India, Bali, Java and Peru, and a collection of British and American patchwork quilts from the last 200 years.
