= Theodor Leopold Weller =

German painter

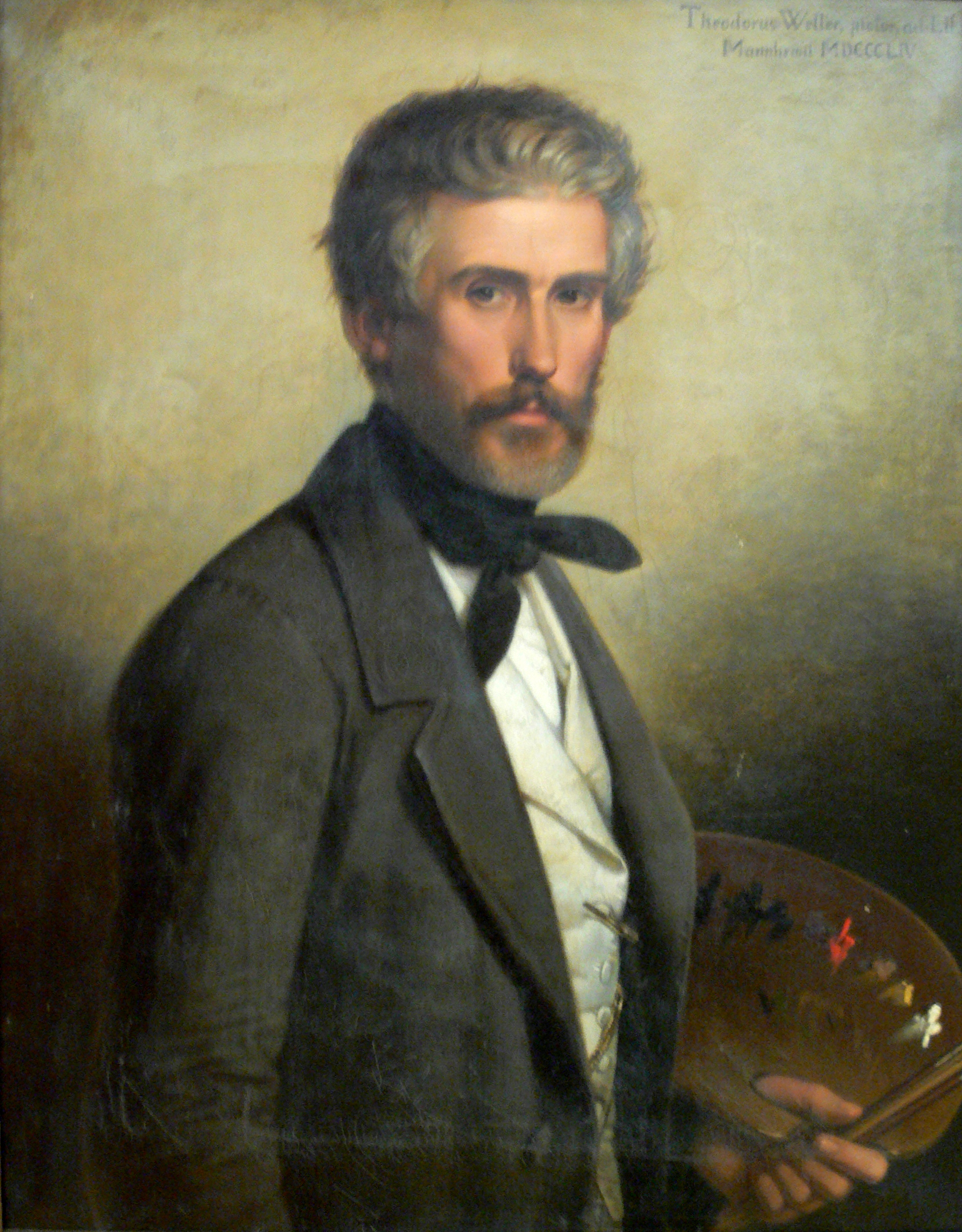
Self-portrait (1854)

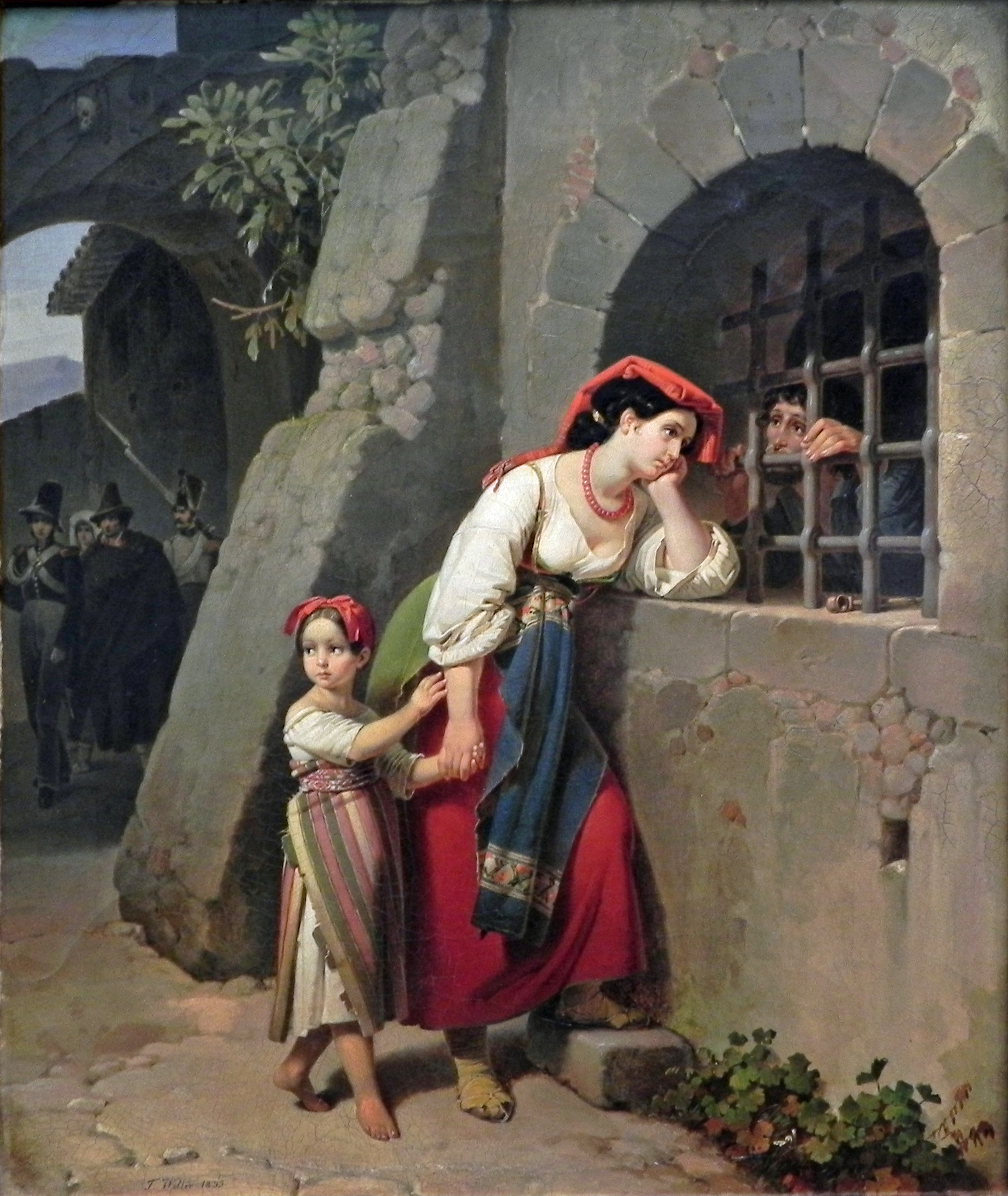
Visit to the Prison (c.1832, modeled by Vittoria Caldoni)

Theodor Leopold Weller (29 May 1802 in Mannheim – 10 December 1880 in Mannheim) was a German genre painter and a major representative of the Munich School.

== Life ==
He was the second son of a Chancery Councillor, who originally wanted him to pursue a legal career, but he displayed an early aptitude for painting.

In 1818, he began his studies at the Academy of Fine Arts, Munich, under Johann Peter von Langer, the first Director. While there, he met Peter von Cornelius, who Crown Prince Ludwig von Bayern had brought there to work on the Glyptothek. However, Weller decided that he was more interested in daily life and nature than grand panoramas. For his detailed and meticulous painting technique, he took Peter von Hess as a model. He travelled to Rome in 1825 with his friend, the landscape painter Ernst Fries and was admitted to the Accademia di San Luca. While there, he hiked throughout Italy, as far as Naples.

In 1833, he returned to Mannheim. In 1836, he married the daughter of a businessman of Italian origin and moved to Munich. From 1839 to 1848, he was back in Italy, then off to Mannheim again in 1851 when he was appointed Director of the Mannheimer Kunstverein (Art Association), serving as a board member for twenty-three years and eventually becoming Curator. In that capacity, prepared a catalog of his own works, which lists 124 items. He died of a stroke.
