= Joseph Anton Settegast =

German painter

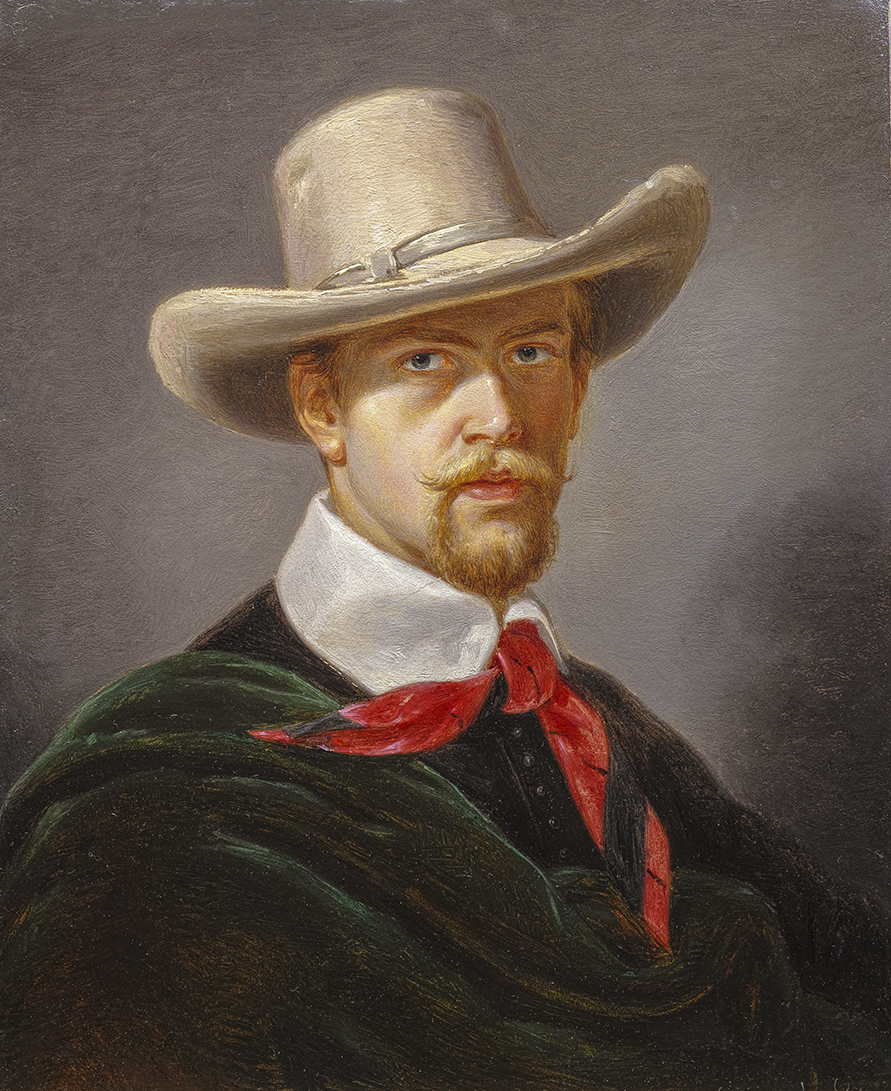
Self-portrait, by Joseph Anton Settegast (1839)

Joseph Anton Nikolaus Settegast (8 February 1813, Koblenz - 19 March 1890, Mainz) was a German church painter and one of the last representatives of the Nazarene movement.

== Life ==
He received his first art instruction from 1829 to 1831 at the Kunstakademie Düsseldorf. However, he became dissatisfied with the quality of the teaching there and went to study with Philipp Veit, at the Städel Art Institute in Frankfurt, where he remained until 1838. During this time, he produced many altar and devotional paintings, including an altarpiece at the parish church in Bad Camberg, done together with his friend, Johann Franz Brentano.

From 1838 to 1843 he made several study trips to Italy and lived in Rome. There he became a member of the "Komponiervereins", a Nazarene association.

After his return, he married Dorothea Veit (1822-1897, his teacher's daughter). They had nine children altogether. At first they lived in Frankfurt, until 1849, then moved to Koblenz, then to Mainz in 1860. He executed commissions for many churches, including the Basilica of St. Castor in Koblenz and the Mainz Cathedral. Numerous images of saints were created for the "Verein zur Verbreitung religiöser Bilder" (Association for the Dissemination of Religious Images). He remained a lifelong admirer of the Nazarenes.

His last years were marred by a fall from a scaffold in Münster, which resulted in permanent injuries that restricted his ability to do large projects. Completely oblivious to new trends in art, his work was increasingly ignored.

== Gallery ==
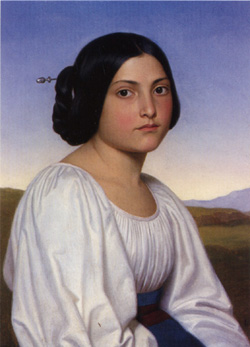
Portrait of an Italian Woman (Vittoria Caldoni)

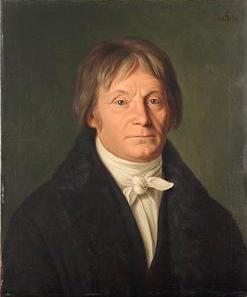
Portrait of the writer,
Joseph Görres

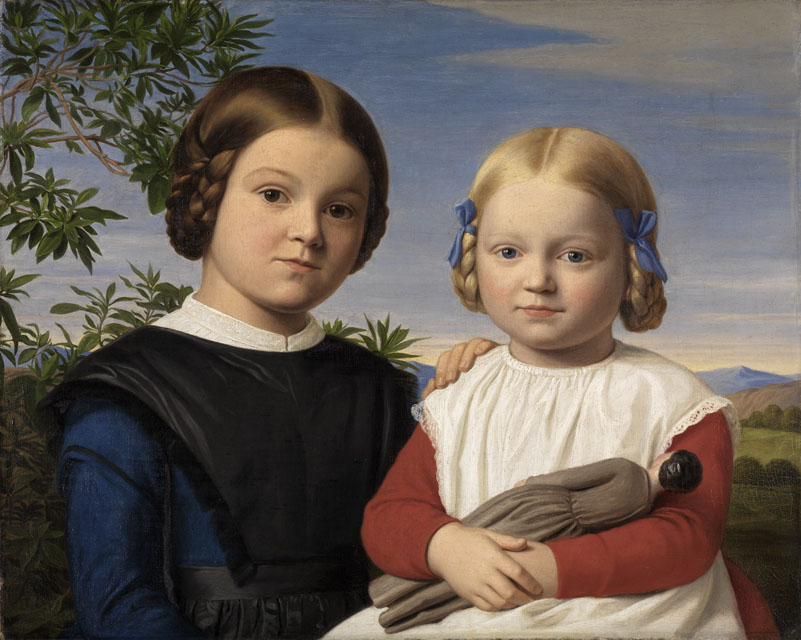
Double portrait of two children

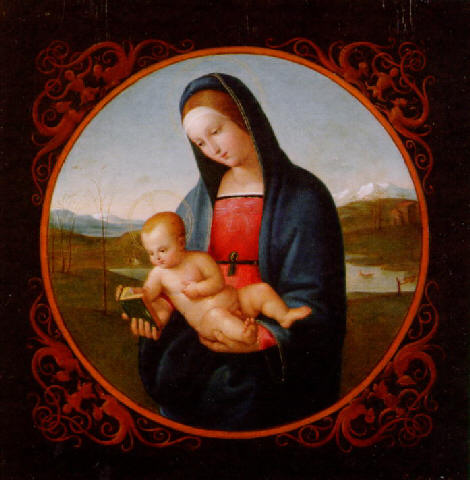
Madonna with the Christ Child
