= Christoph Hawich =

German lithographer, drawing teacher and porcelain painter

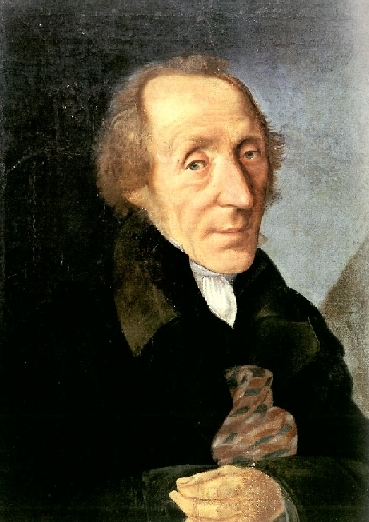
Self-portrait (1828)

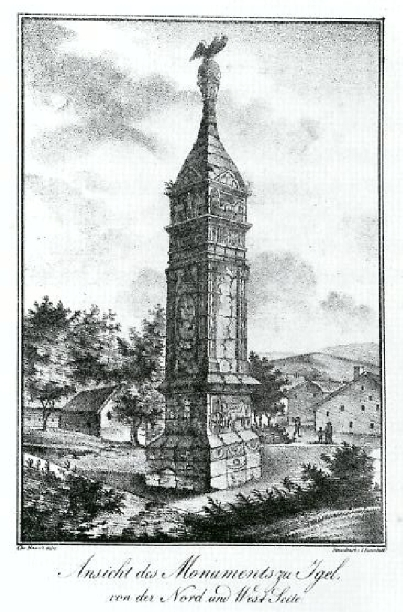
Lithograph of the Igel Column

Christoph Hawich (17 September 1782, Trier – 5 September 1848, Trier) was a German lithographer, drawing teacher and porcelain painter. His name is also given as "Hahvich", "Havig", and "Habich".

== Biography ==
He came from a family of painters that emigrated to Trier from Koblenz in mid-eighteenth century. His first artistic training came from his father, Stephan Hawich, and a local painter named Jungblut. A letter of application to be a drawing teacher mentions additional study in Düsseldorf, but there is no independent evidence of this.

He was initially employed as a drawing teacher at several private schools, and briefly operated his own. In 1816, he obtained a position at the Trier porcelain manufactory, which had been acquired by a family friend when the area passed from French to Prussian rule. In addition to painting the porcelain, he was in charge of the manufactory's drawing school. He created many of his own designs, but also used those provided by other artists. Due to company policy, he was unable to sign his name to them. Most of the designs were of local landscapes and Roman-era monuments.

In 1822, he was able to find a permanent position as a drawing teacher at the new Knabenbürgerschule (Boys' School). He remained there until 1846, when he was forced to retire, due to age related issues. He also gave private lessons to working people until 1830, when they were no longer profitable, due to changes in working hours that effectively limited him to Sundays.

In 1823, he became the first lithographer in Trier; helped by a loan from the city government and some individual patrons. That same year, he issued a large portfolio with views of Trier and explanatory text, written by Theodor von Haupt. Many of the images were adapted from his porcelains. From 1824 to 1826, he created another series devoted to the history, notable personalities and topography of Trier. Most of the original images were provided by Johann Hugo Wyttenbach, founder and manager of the Municipal Library. The text was written by Dr. Johann Mathias Neurohr (1777-1841), an amateur archaeologist. His business closed in 1827, due to slow sales.

Both of his marriages, to Margarete Becker from Eschdorf (1810) and Elisabeth Molitor from Trier (1838), remained childless.
