= Josef von Hempel =

Austrian painter and writer

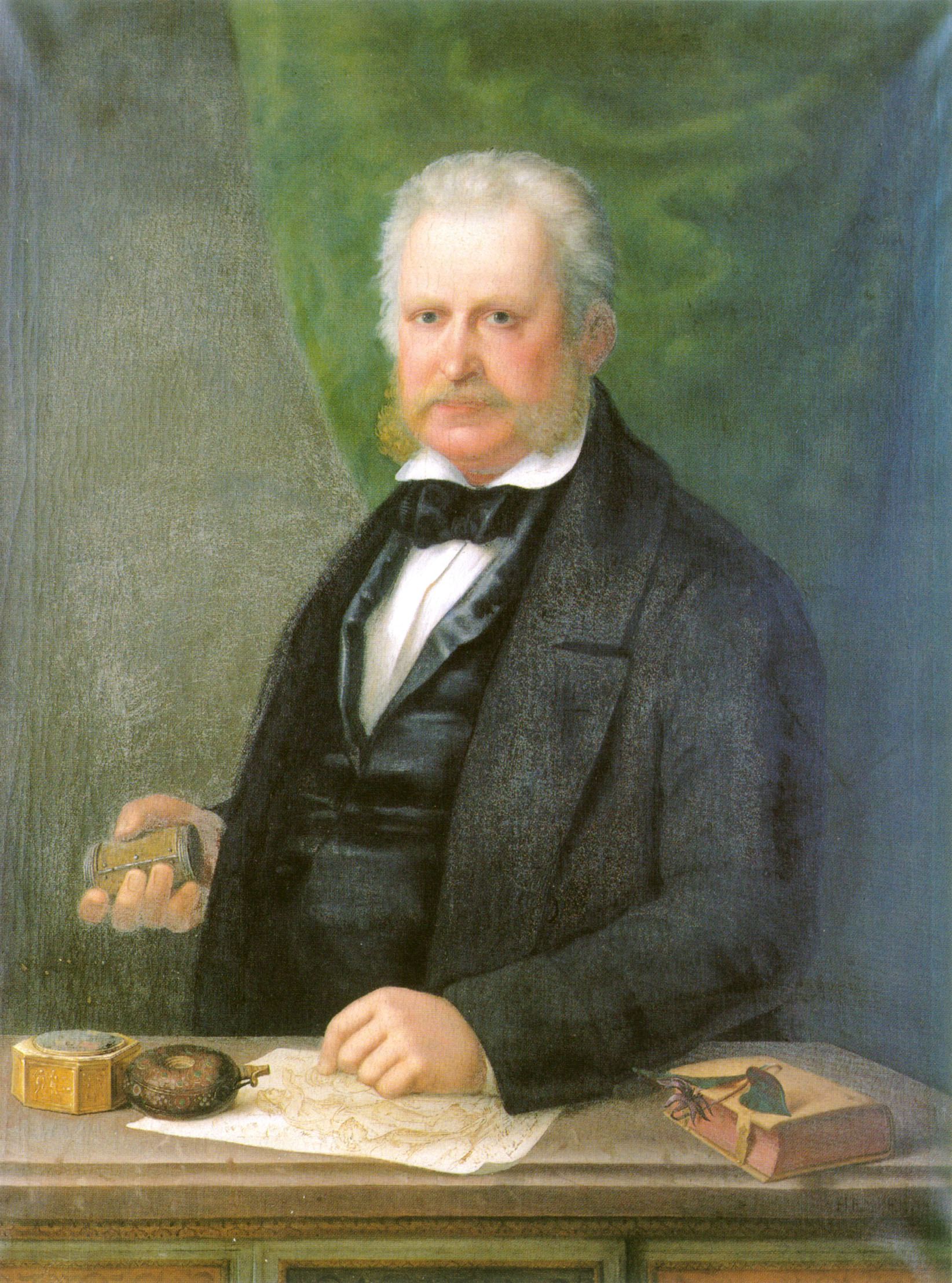
Self-portrait (1856)

Sebastian Josef Ritter und Edler von Hempel (9 February 1800 – 2 September 1871) was an Austrian painter of the Nazarene movement and an author.

== Life ==
=== Youth and travels to Italy ===
He was born in Vienna to a wealthy aristocratic family. As part of his education, he made frequent visits to the picture gallery at the Schloss Belvedere, where he decided that he would like to be a painter. After some resistance from his parents, he became enrolled at the Academy of Fine Arts in 1815. At that time, Classicism was the predominant style taught there, but it was beginning to fall into disfavor among the students.

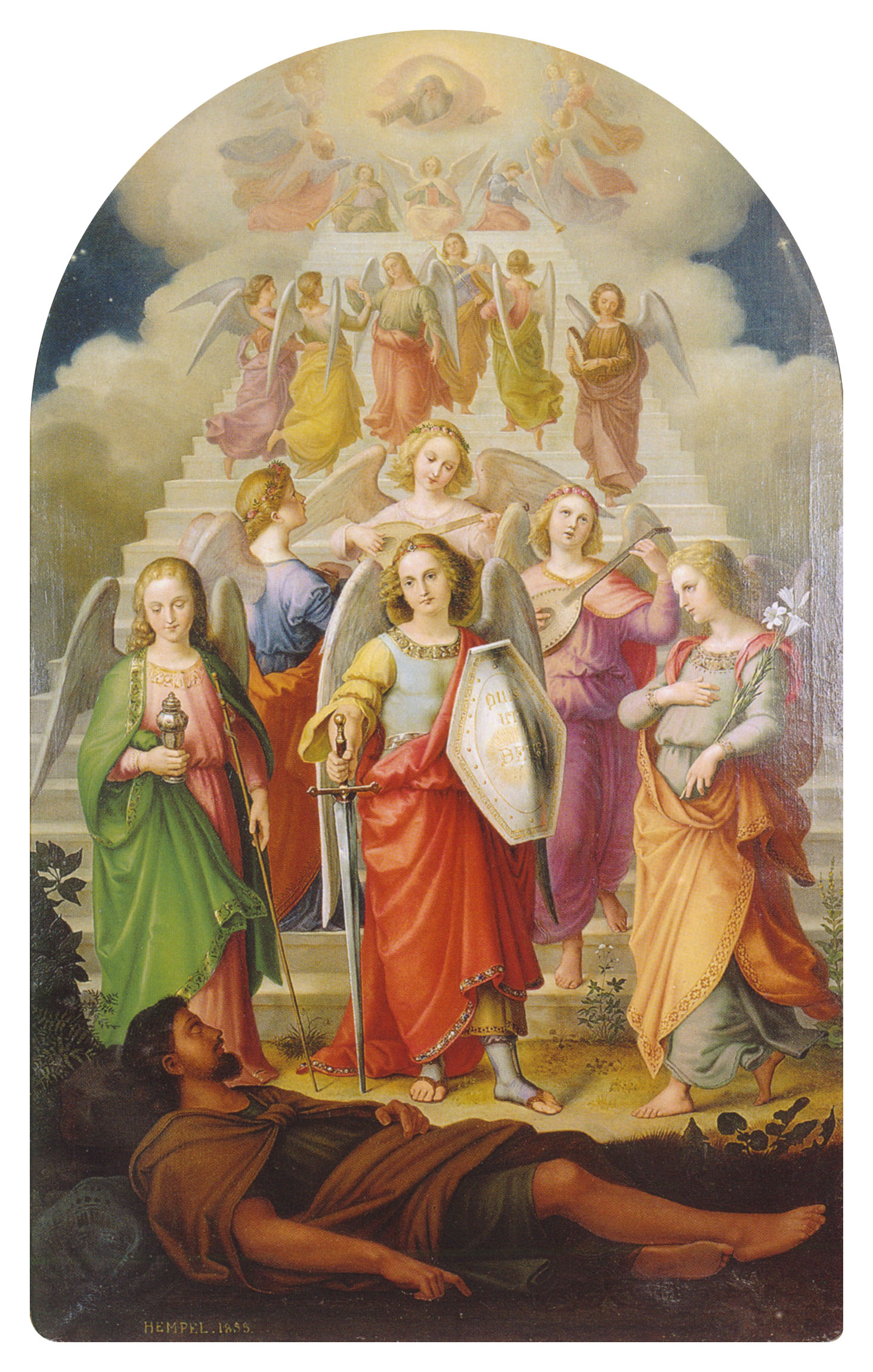
Jacob's Dream of the Staircase to Heaven (1855)

In the Spring of 1821, he took a trip to Rome with a stopover at Florence, where he made the acquaintance of Leopold Kupelwieser and other like-minded young artists who encouraged his dislike of the Academy's style. He continued to Rome, copying paintings and producing scenes from nature, then returned home in 1825.

=== Early career ===
In Vienna, he continued his artistic studies, but also took classes in philosophy from Friedrich Schlegel and attended lectures on botany. He converted to Catholicism in 1827 and married, ultimately having ten children. In 1832, he acquired the lordly estates of Kattau and Missingdorf, near Horn in Lower Austria. He then created a series of altarpieces for the surrounding parish churches, at his own expense, and contributed to their general restoration. However, he apparently missed the mental stimulation of a large city, selling his properties in 1839 and returning to Vienna.

Initially, he was excited by the Revolution of 1848, even going so far as to join the "National Guard", but his aristocratic upbringing reasserted itself and he moved with his family to Klagenfurt, where he started his own art school at the local Lyceum. He relocated again in 1850, this time to Bolzano, but the climate was too damp and cold for his ailing wife and his children were not getting a good education, so he moved to Graz.

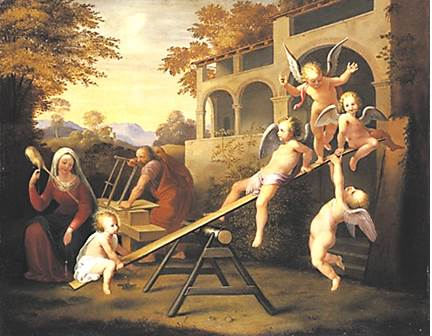
The Christ Child on a Seesaw (1850)

=== Later years ===
In 1859, once again feeling the need to be a landowner, he acquired estates in Vrbovec and Rakovec, Croatia. The agricultural land was a good investment, but he and his family were isolated as they didn't speak any Croatian. After four years, he sold the land and returned to Graz where his wife died two years later. At that time, he gave up oil painting and devoted himself entirely to botanical drawings of wild plants. Eventually, his eyesight deteriorated to the point where he couldn't paint or draw, so he began to write poetry, producing a verse comedy called "Graf Biegler" and two verse dramas; "Raphael" and "The Oath". None of them are currently available. He died suddenly while visiting his daughter Karoline and her husband in Tokod.
