= Johann Hugo Wyttenbach =

German librarian and historian (1767–1848)

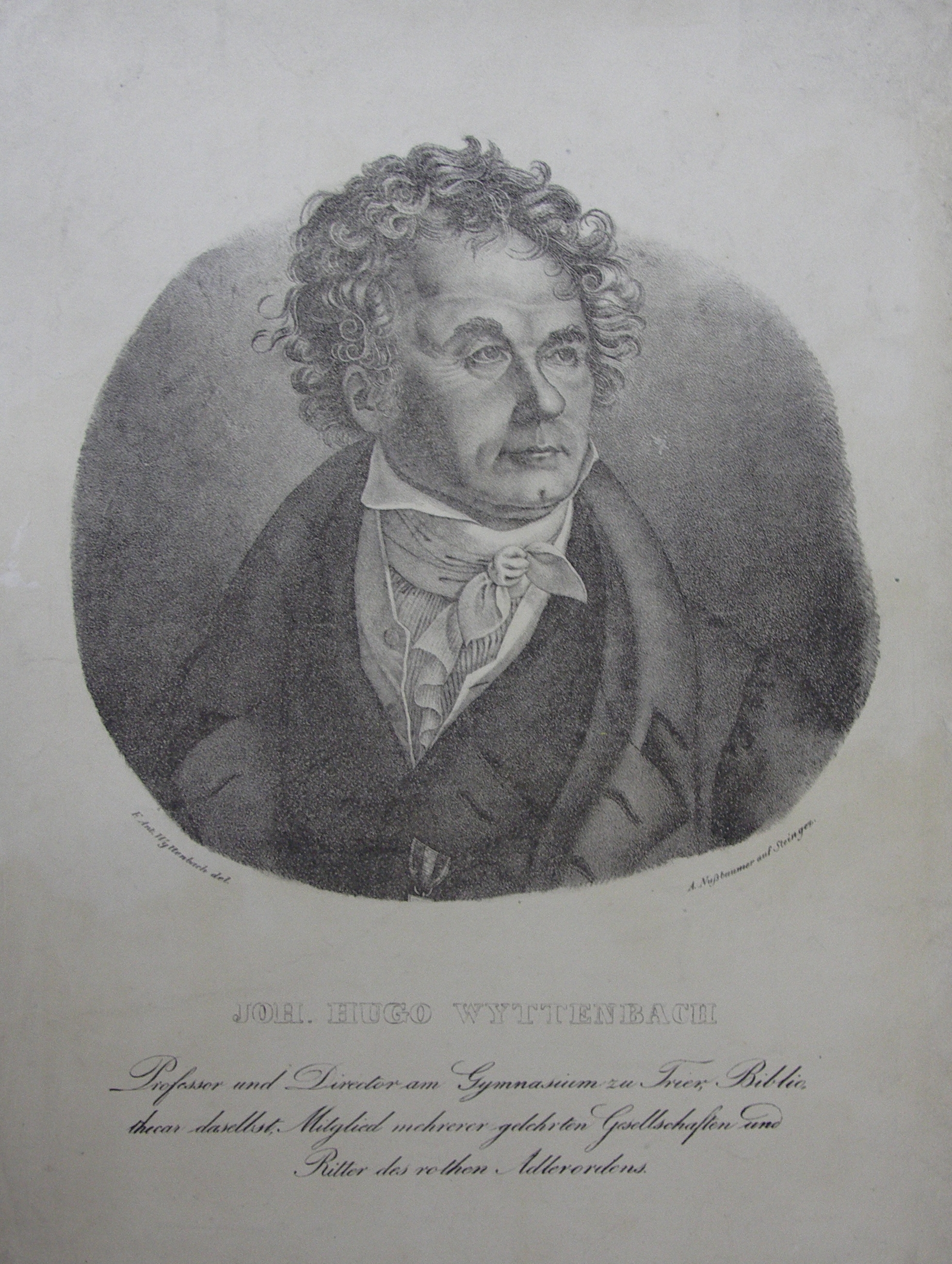
Lithograph of Johann Hugo Wyttenbach by Johann Anton Ramboux

Johann Hugo Wyttenbach (6 April 1767, Bausendorf – 22 June 1848, Trier) was a German librarian, historian and school master.

== Biography ==
Wyttenbach was born into the family of a teacher. Orphaned at a young age, he was raised by his godfather. From 1784 to 1786, he studied theology at the University of Trier and Trier Seminary. In 1788 he dropped out of his studies and became a follower of the Enlightenment and was especially interested in the works of Rousseau and Kant.

During the French period, he became a supporter of the revolutionary Republican government and applied at the French central administration of the Saard department, becoming a member of the school commission during the Napoleonic rule in 1799, and a librarian and professor of the central school as well as the first city librarian from 1804 to 1848. By 1810 he saved around 60,000 volumes of manuscripts and prints from the monastery and monastery libraries in the Saard department, which had been secularized in 1802, to the Trier city library. Because of his position during French rule and his liberal sympathies, he was under supervision of the Prussian government and therefore a co-principal, Vitus Loers, was appointed alongside him, who played the role of an informer for the authorities.

In 1801, he was a co-founder of the Society for Useful Research in Trier and its secretary from 1809 to 1822. In 1815, he was captain of the vigilance committee in Trier. From 1830 to 1835, he was Karl Marx's history teacher and had significant influence on the views of the young Marx.

Wyttenbach kept in touch with the leading German writers of his time, including Goethe, Jakob Grimm, Hofmann von Fallersleben, and Clemens Brentano. He was a devout follower of the philosophy of Rousseau.

== Works ==
- Aussprüche der philosophirenden Vernunft und des reinen Herzens über die der Menschheit wichtigsten Gegenstände mit besonderer Rücksicht auf die kritische Philosophie zusammengetragen aus den Schriften älterer und neuerer Denker, Rötzel, Leipzig, 1796 Digitalisat MDZ Reader, 2. und verbesserte Auflage, Leipzig, 1798 OCLC 872485232
- Plan einer inneren Einrichtung für Primärschulen. Trier, Hetzrodt und Schröll, 1798 OCLC 1071282174
- Denkmal den Wohlthätern des Menschengeschlechts. Trier, Fischer, 1799 Digitalisat Uni Köln
- Handbuch für den Unterricht in den Pflichten und Rechten des Menschen und des Bürgers. Trier, Hetzrodt, 1801 Digitalisat delibri Rheinland-Pfalz
- (Hrsg.): Der Geist der Religion. Mohr, Frankfurt a. M., 1806 Digitalisat MDZ Reader
- Versuch einer Geschichte von Trier. Schröll, Trier., 1810 Digitalisat delibri Rheinland-Pfalz
- Neue Beiträge zur antiken heidnischen und christlichen Epigraphik. Trier, Blattau, 1833 Digitalisat MDZ Reader
- Die Liebfrauen-Kirche zu Trier Aufgenommen mit Bemerkungen begleitet und hrsg. von Christian Wilhelm Schmidt. Nebst historischen Erläuterungen von Johann Hugo Wyttenbach. Gebrüder Kehr & Niessen, Coeln, 1836 Digitalisat ETH Zürich
- With Michael Franz Josef Müller: Gesta Trevirorum. 3 Bände, Trier, Lintz, 1836–1839 Digitalisat delibri Rheinland-Pfalz
- Recherches sur les antiquités romaines dans la vallée de la Moselle de Trèves. Trier, Lintz, 1840 Digitalisat MDZ Reader
- Schulreden vom Jahre 1799 bis 1846. Fr. Lintz, Trier. 1847 Digitalisat Google Books
