= Johann Anton Ramboux =

German painter and lithographer

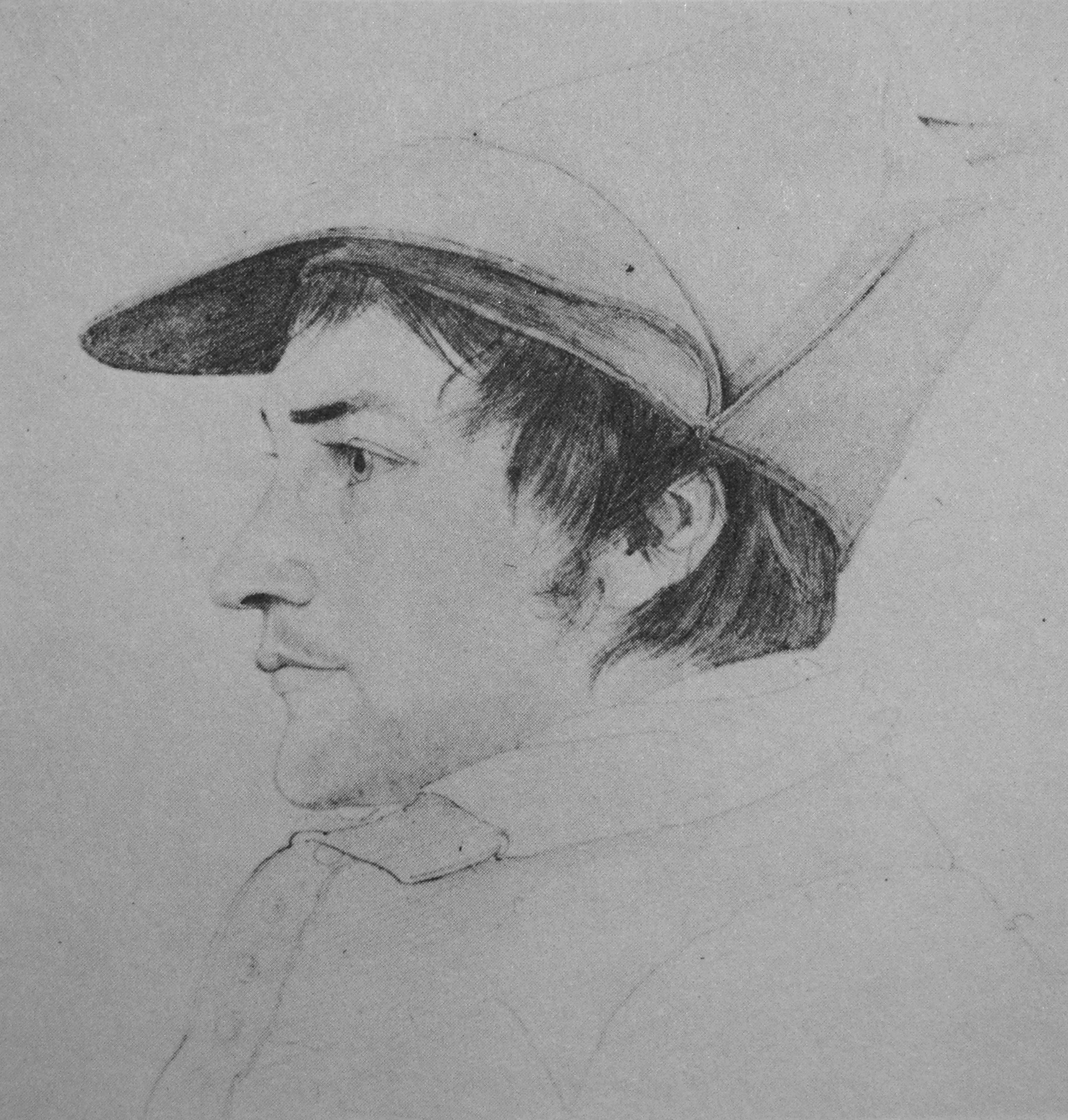
- Portriat of Ramboux from a pencil sketch by Carl Philipp Fohr
- Born: 5 October 1790; Trier, Electorate of Trier, Holy Roman Empire
- Died: 2 October 1866 (aged 75); Cologne, Rhine Province, Kingdom of Prussia
- Education: Royal Academy of Fine Arts; Beaux-Arts de Paris
- Known for: Lithography
- Movement: Nazarene
- Awards: Honorary Citizen of Trier; 1858

Johann Anton Alban Ramboux (5 October 1790 – 2 October 1866) was a German painter and lithographer.

== Life ==
He was born in Trier. His father came from Savoy and his mother was from a famous family of goldsmiths. Christoph Hawich, his drawing teacher at the Bürgerschule (a type of commercial preparatory school) in Trier noted his artistic talent. As a result, in 1803 he received a recommendation to study with Jean-Henri Gilson (1741–1809), a former Benedictine monk who taught art in Florenville.

After four years there, he received a further recommendation to study with Jacques-Louis David in Paris, where Ramboux remained until 1812. In 1815, he was admitted to the Royal Academy of Fine Arts, becoming a pupil of Konrad Eberhard.

In 1816 he moved to Rome, where he lived until 1822. While there, he made the acquaintance of many fellow painters who were involved in the Nazarene movement. He returned to Trier for ten years, creating hundreds of watercolors of the city and the Moselle River, which he began reproducing as lithographs in 1825. This came to an end in 1827 when the lithography firm, owned by his former teacher, Hawich, went out of business. In 1832, he began another ten-year stay in Italy, producing landscapes and folk-scenes as well as copies of Renaissance frescoes and mosaics.

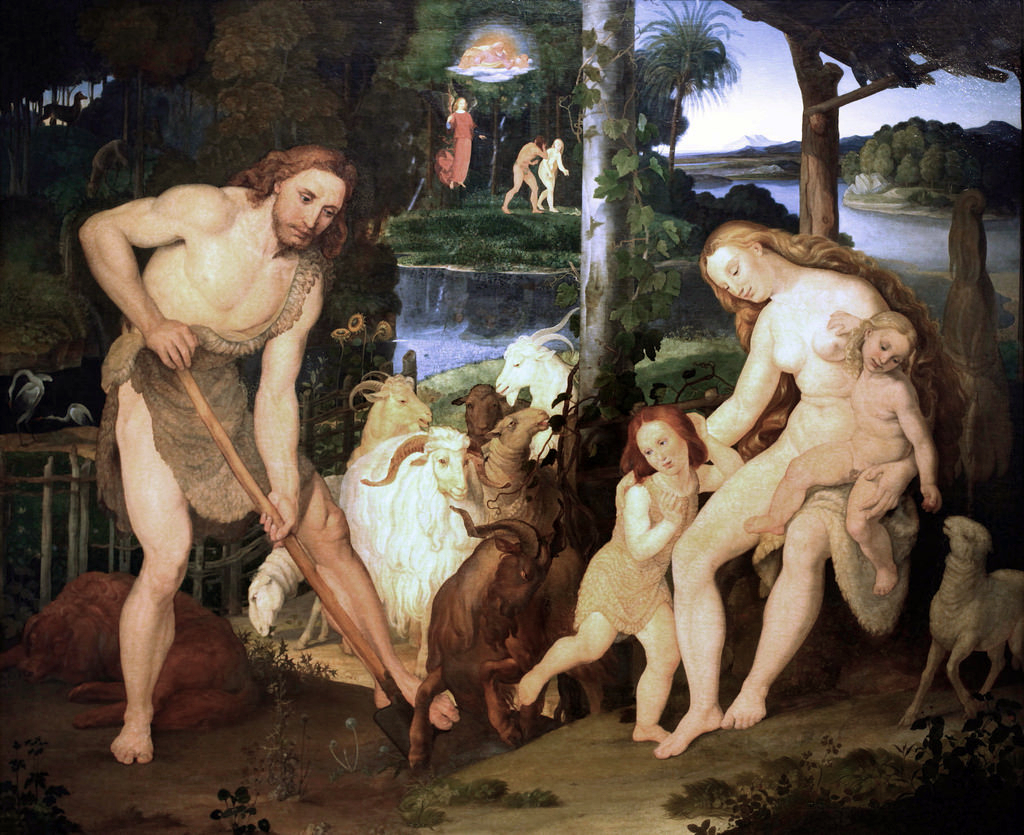
Adam and Eve after the Expulsion from Paradise, (c. 1818)

=== Work in Cologne ===
In 1843, a curator was needed for the Wallraf Collection (now the Wallraf-Richartz Museum) in Cologne and Ramboux was recommended for the position by Johann Gottfried Schadow. He was appointed and took office in 1844. Ten years later, he was able to make a long-desired pilgrimage to Jerusalem, producing hundreds of watercolors and lithographs along the way. In 1858, he was made the first Honorary Citizen of Trier. He died in 1866 in Cologne.

A street is named after him in the Longerich district of Cologne. Since 1961, the City of Trier has awarded the Ramboux Prize to promote the development of young artists.

== Selected writings ==
- Beiträge zur Kunstgeschichte der Malerei (transl. Contributions to the History of Painting), Cologne, 1860 (300 pages)
- Umrisse zur Veranschaulichung altchristlicher Kunst in Italien vom Jahr 1200–1600 (transl. Outline of Early Christian Art in Italy), Cologne, 1854 (125 pages)
