= Konrad Eberhard =

German historical painter and sculptor

- Born: November 25, 1768; Hindelang, Algau
- Died: March 12, 1859 (aged 90); Munich
- Education: Academy of Munich
- Known for: Sculpture, historical painting
- Notable work: Tomb of princess Caroline, statues of St. George and St. Michael; The Adoration of the Magi
- Relatives: Franz Eberhard (brother)
- Patrons: Clement Wenceslas

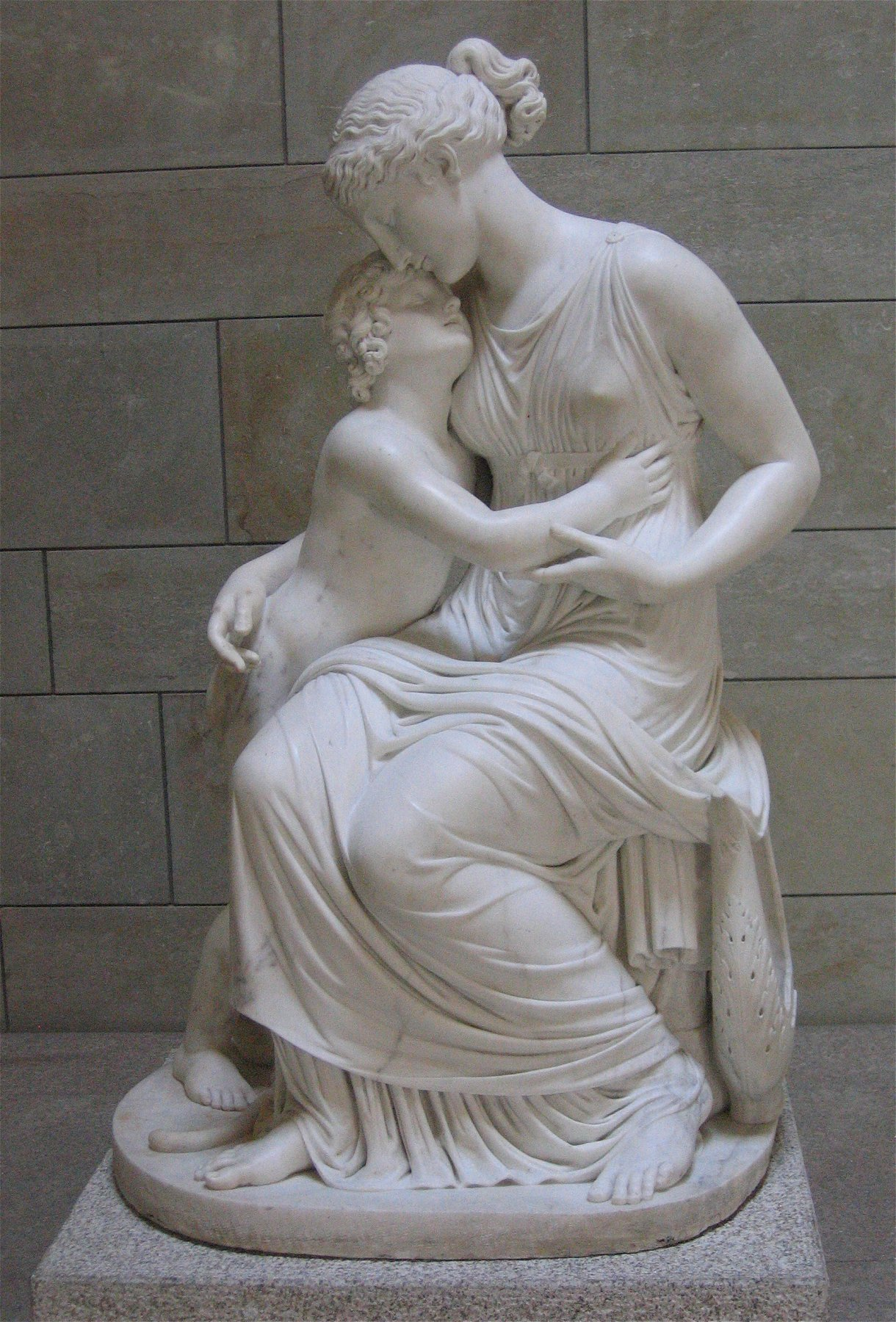
Amor and the Muse, 1807-1811

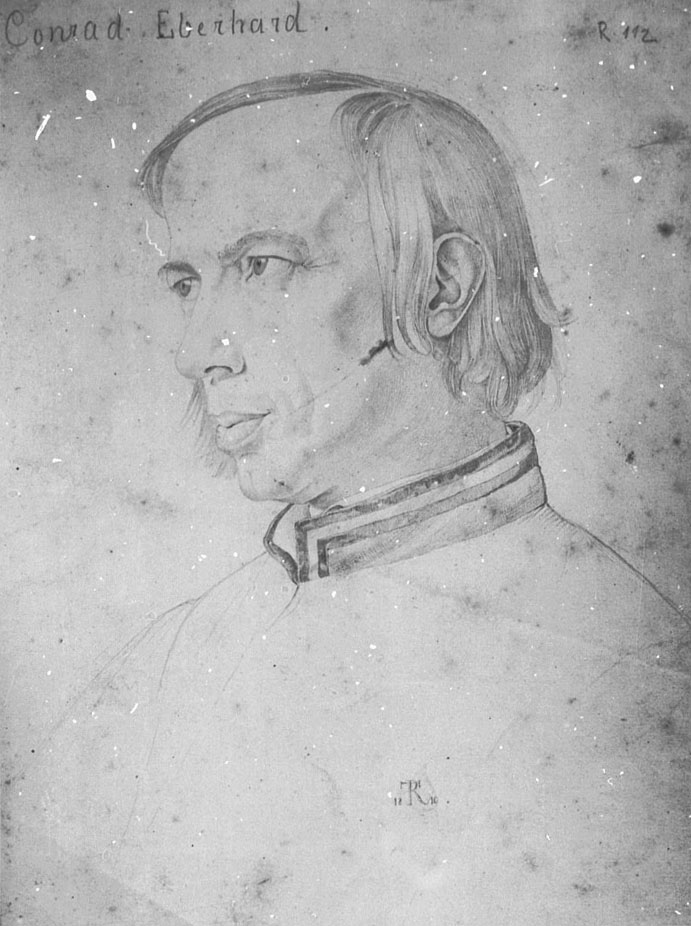
Portrait of Eberhard by Theodor Rehbenitz

Konrad Eberhard (25 November 1768 – 12 March 1859), a German historical painter, better known as a sculptor, was one of the foremost artists of the so-called Nazarene School, which at one time gathered round Friedrich Overbeck in Rome.

== Biography ==
He was born at Hindelang in Algau, where his father and grandfather were sculptors and carvers. The Elector of Treves and Bishop of Augsburg, Clement Wenceslas, often had occasion to go to Hindelang, where he made the acquaintance of Eberhard, and induced him to visit the Academy of Munich in 1798 to work under his fellow-countryman Roman Anton Boos. In 1816 he was appointed professor of sculpture at the Academy. He died at Munich.

== Works ==
Among his best sculptures are the tomb of the princess Caroline in the Theatinerkirche, and the statues of St. George and St. Michael before the Isar gate in Munich. He painted many pictures illustrating the conflicts, progress, and triumphs of the Christian religion. One of them, The Adoration of the Magi, is especially beautiful.

== Family ==
In most of his works he was assisted by his elder brother, Franz Eberhard, an excellent sculptor, who was born at Hindelang in 1767, and died of cholera at Munich in 1836.

== See also ==
- List of German painters
