= Robert Fohr =

French art historian, translator and author

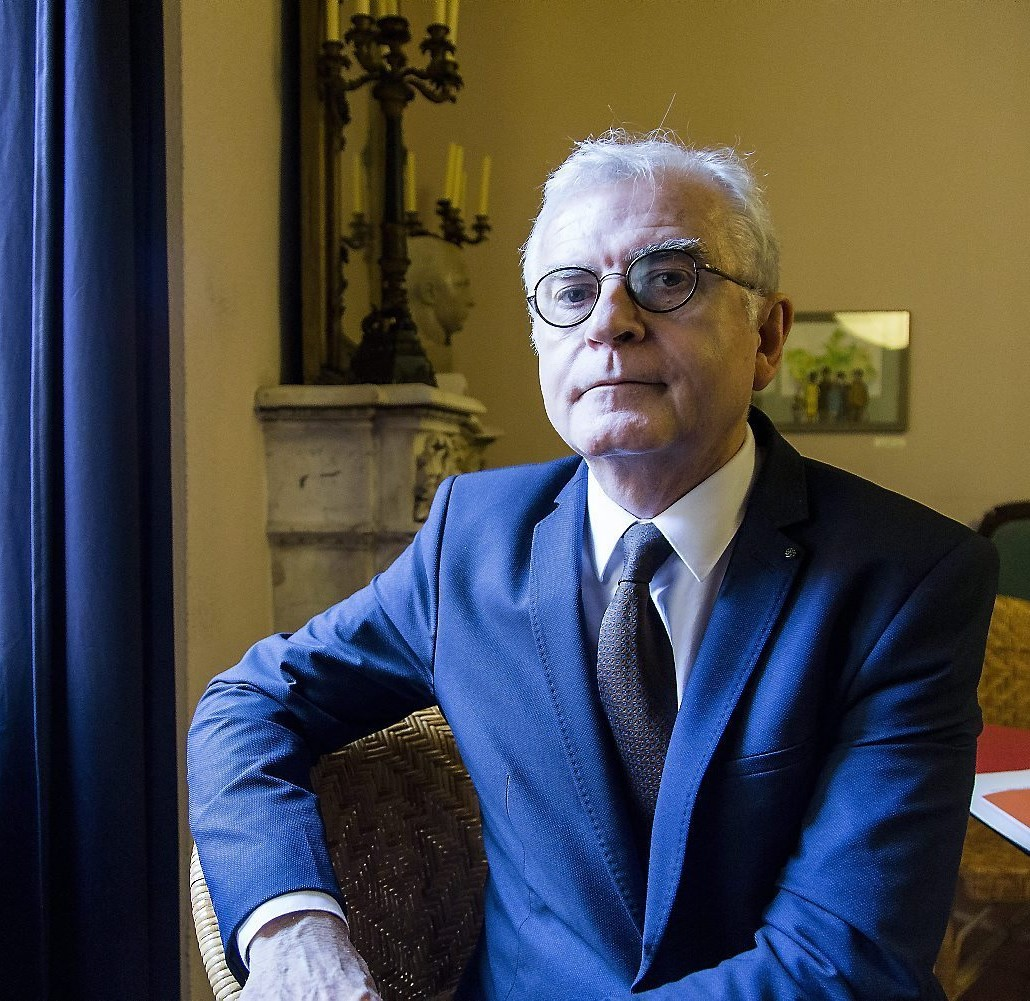
Robert Fohr

Robert Fohr (born 1954) is a French art historian, translator and author. Since 2006 he has been head of the Sponsorship Mission at the French Ministry of Culture.

Between 1981 and 1983 he was resident pensionnaire at the French Academy in Rome.

In 2008 he received the Paul Marmottan prize from the Paris Academy of Fine Arts for his monograph Georges de La Tour le maître des nuits.

== Biography ==
He was born into a French family of Austrian and Lorraine origin and Catholic faith.

After completing his higher education at the Lycée Henri-IV (Paris) and the Paris-Sorbonne University (history and art history), he was a resident at the French Academy in Rome from 1981 to 1983. He then worked in publishing (Hachette Group) and journalism (freelance journalist at Le Quotidien de Paris), before joining the Ministry of Culture in February 1992 as head of communications for the French Museums Directorate, where he worked successively with three directors: Jacques Sallois, advisor to the Court of Auditors and first director of the office of Jacques Lang, Minister of Culture; Françoise Cachin, general curator of heritage and former director of the Musée d'Orsay; and Francine Mariani-Ducray, civil administrator and advisor to the Council of State. As a result, he was involved in the major movement to renew France's museums, as well as in issues relating to Nazi spoliation and restitution. In particular, he was responsible for designing and organizing the symposium Pillages et restitutions. Le destin des œuvres d'art sorties de France pendant la Seconde Guerre mondiale (Looting and Restitution: The Fate of Works of Art Taken from France during World War II) (Paris, 1996).

From February 2006 to April 2022, Robert Fohr headed the Ministry of Culture's patronage mission working to promote cultural patronage, disseminate the incentives provided for in Law No. 2003-709 of August 1, 2003 on patronage, associations, and foundations, and develop best practices ("Charter of Cultural Patronage" published in 2014). In this capacity, his department has engaged the Ministry of Culture in partnerships with institutions in the economic and legal worlds (Medef, Chambers of Commerce and Industry, Order of Chartered Accountants, High Council of Notaries, and National Bar Council) and set up a program of recognized thematic meetings, the "Jeudis du mécénat" (Sponsorship Thursdays).As part of his duties, Robert Fohr represented the Minister of Culture on the board of directors of the Fondation de France from 2006 to 2022 and participated in numerous events related to patronage and foundations, including internationally. He is also intuitu personae administrator of the Pierre Mercier Archaeological Foundation, recognized as a public utility, the AG2R La Mondiale Corporate Foundation for Artistic Vitality, the LaVita association, and The Beit Project France association. In the field of finance, he is also a director of the Société locale d'épargne (SLE) Paris Est of the Groupe Caisse d'Épargne Ile-de-France. He is a member of the French section of the International Association of Art Critics (AICA) and a member of ICOM France.

A historian and art historian by training, in 2018 he received the Paul-Marmottan Prize from the Académie des Beaux-Arts for his monograph Georges de La Tour, le maître des nuits (Georges de La Tour, Master of the Nights).

In May 2022, he was elevated to the rank of Ordre des Arts et des Lettres, an honor bestowed upon him by Jean-Jacques Aillagon, former Minister of Culture.

Robert Fohr is the father of two children, born from his marriage to Isabelle Bénignus Van Brabant, pianist and composer: Oriane Fohr, born in December 1985, cellist, and Pierre-Louis Fohr, born in April 1991, architect.

== Works ==
(includes collaborations and translations)

- Tout l'œuvre peint de Bruegel l'Ancien (1981)
- Inventaire des collections publiques françaises (1982)
- Tours, musée des Beaux-Arts (1982)
- Patrice Alexandre (1983)
- Tout l'œuvre peint d'Ingres (1984)
- Tout l'œuvre peint de Vermeer (1985)
- La norme et le caprice redécouvertes en art aspects du goût... (1986)
- Rediscoveries in art... (1986)
- Guy Brunet l'horizon de l'atelier (1990)
- Chagall: la période russe (1991)
- Giovanni Battista Piranesi, 1720-1778... (1991)
- Georges de La Tour le maître des nuits (1998)
- Daumier sculpteur et peintre (1999)

== Sources ==
- Robert Fohr, facebook
- Robert Fohr, AICA
