= Daniel Fohr =

German painter

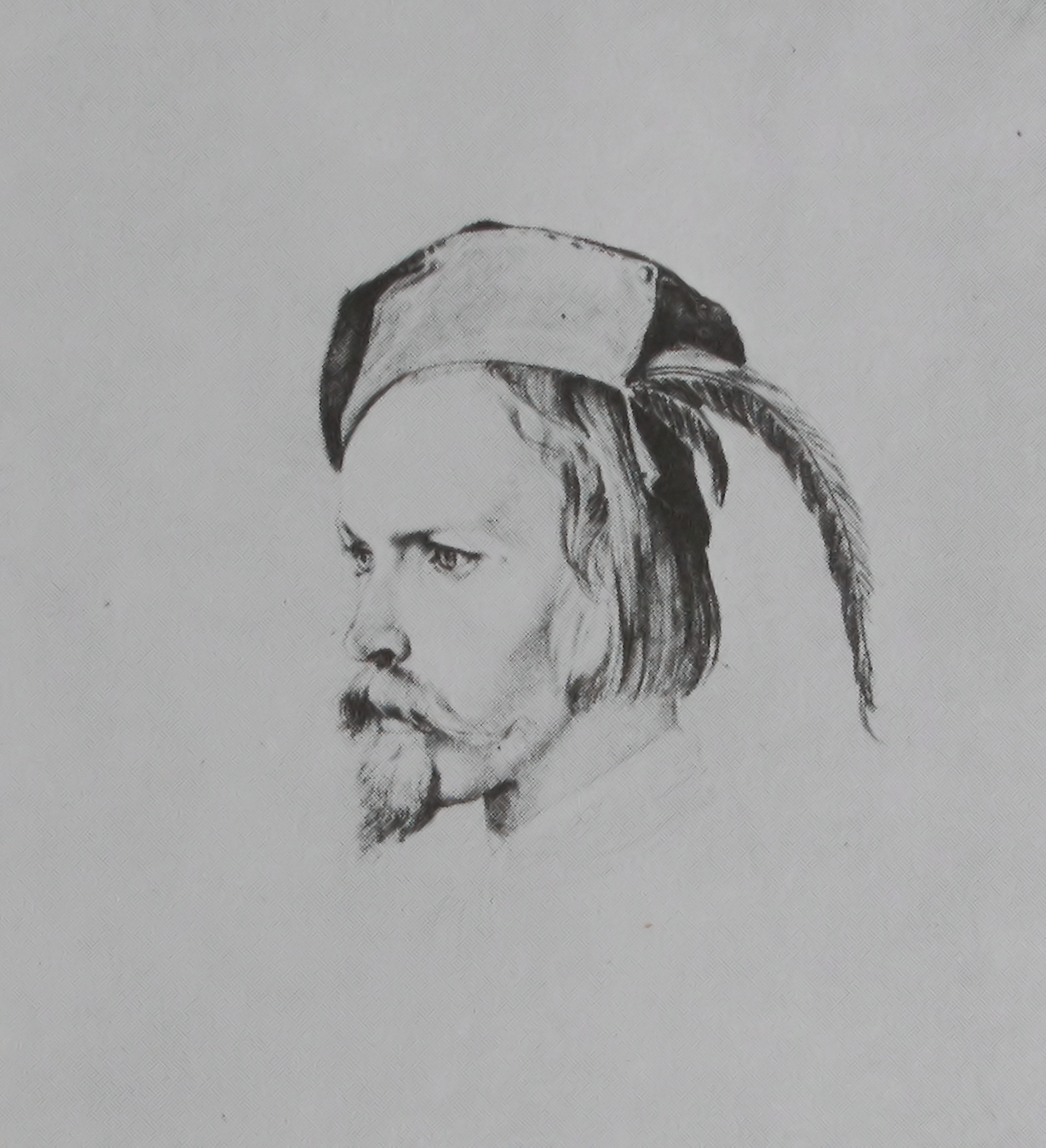
Portrait of Fohr by August Lucas, pencil drawing from 1828

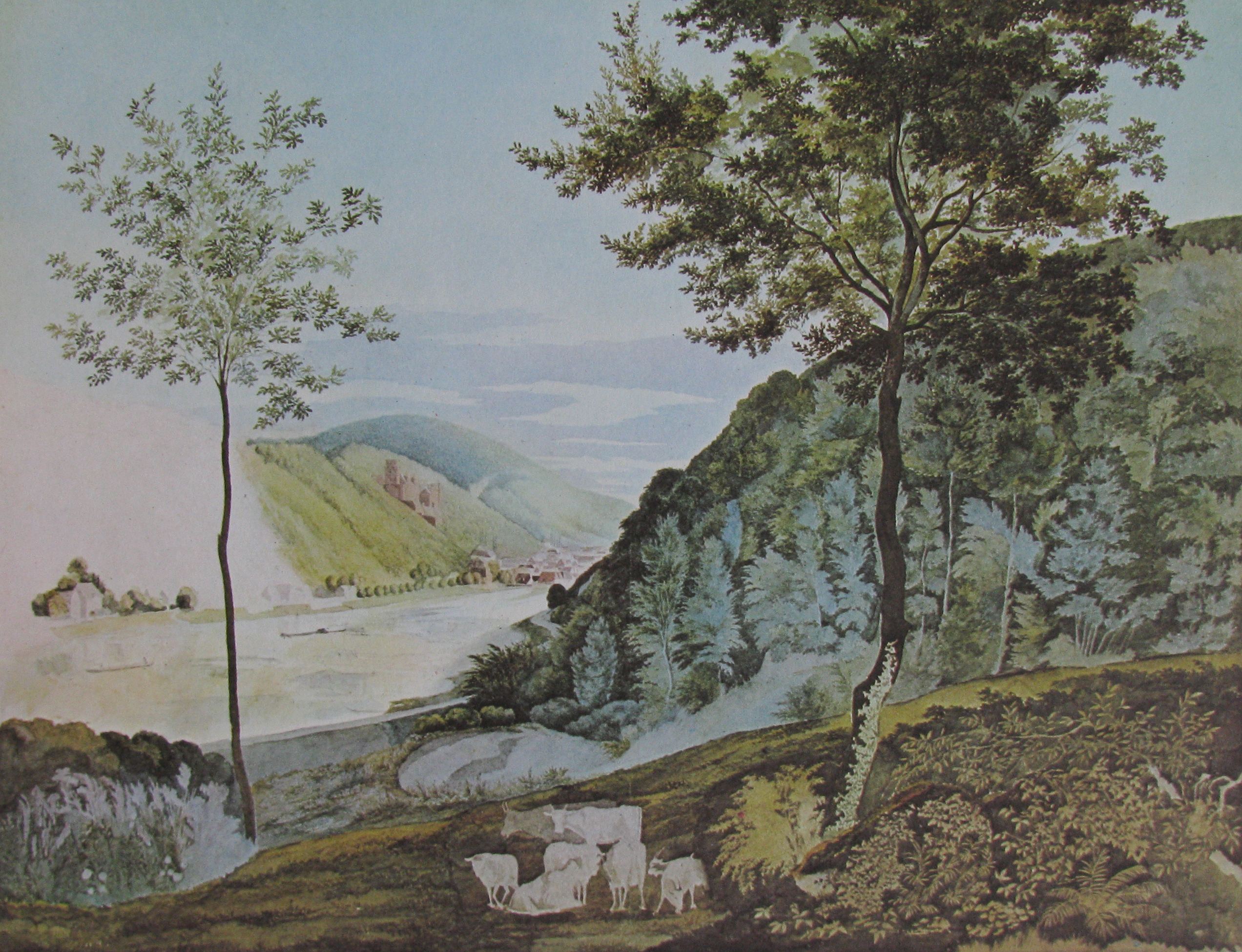
View of Heidelberg, ca. 1829

Daniel Fohr was a German painter who served as court painter to the Grand Duke of Baden in the mid-19th century. Fohr was born at Heidelberg in 1801 and first studied science, which he afterwards abandoned for the art of painting. After studying painting for some time by himself, he went to Munich in 1829, and then to the Tyrol. Fohr died at Baden-Baden in 1862. His works can be found in Gallery at Carlsruhe.

== See also ==
- List of German painters
