= Nazarene movement =

Early 19th century German Romantic painters

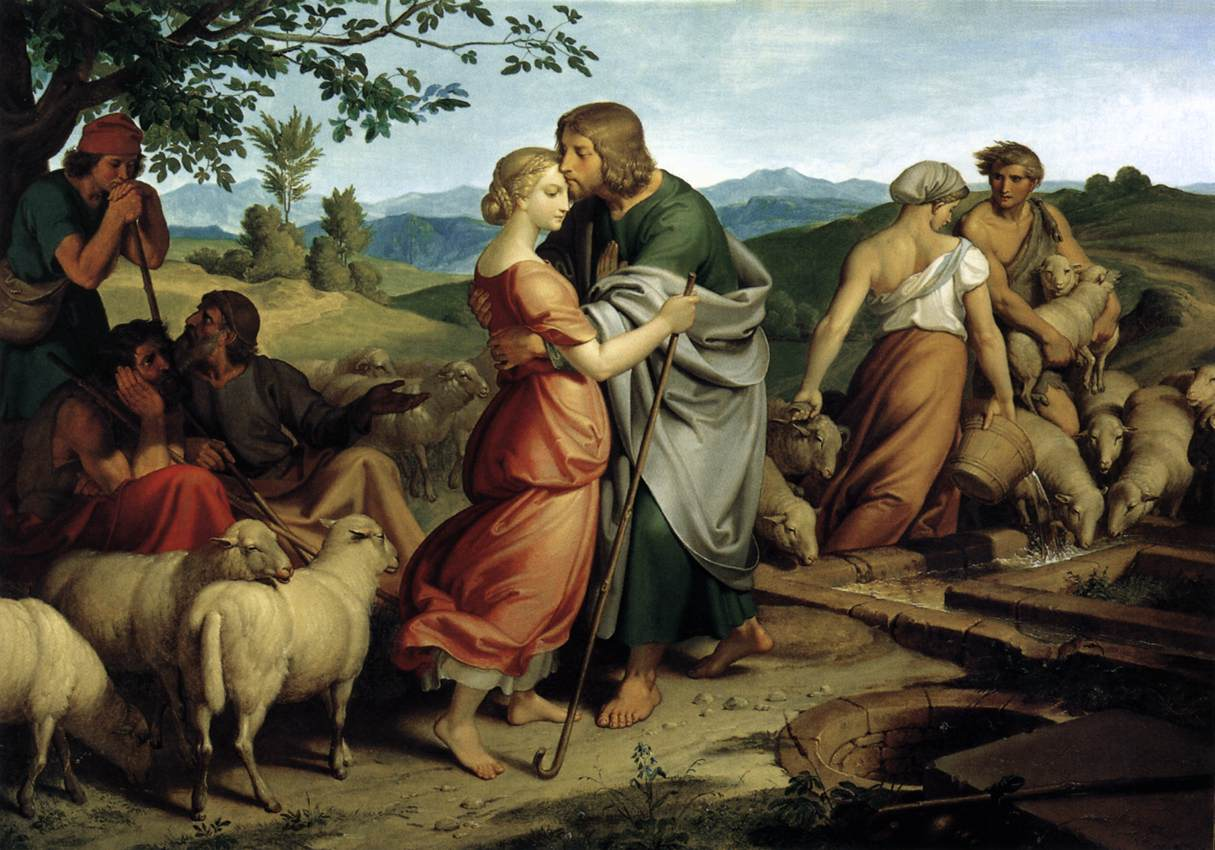
In Jacob encountering Rachel with her father's herd (1836), Joseph von Führich attempts to recapture the mood of Perugino and Raphael (Österreichische Galerie Belvedere, Vienna)

The epithet Nazarene was adopted by a group of early 19th-century German Romantic painters who aimed to revive spirituality in art. The name Nazarene came from a term of derision used against them for their affectation of a biblical manner of clothing and hair style.

== History ==
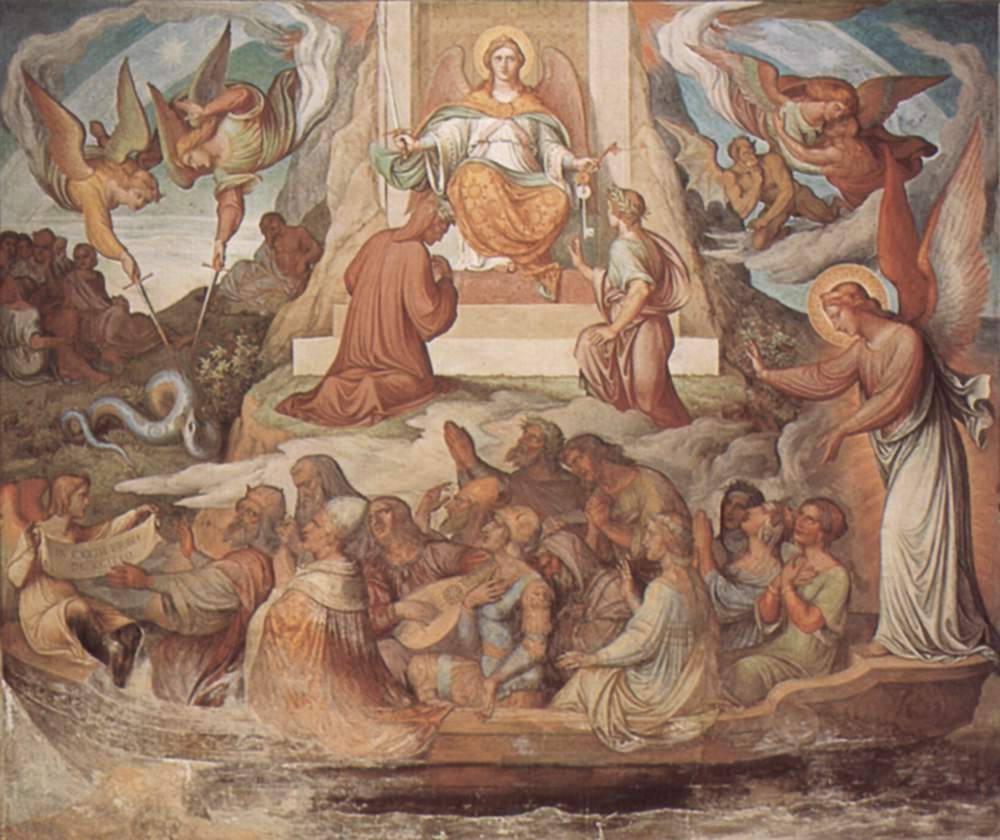
Joseph Anton Koch, Detail of the Dante-Cycle in the Casino Massimo

In 1809, six students at the Vienna Academy formed an artistic cooperative in Vienna called the Brotherhood of St. Luke or Lukasbund, following a common name for medieval guilds of painters. In 1810 four of them, Johann Friedrich Overbeck, Franz Pforr, Ludwig Vogel and Johann Konrad Hottinger (1788–1827) moved to Rome, where they occupied the abandoned monastery of San Isidoro. They were joined by Philipp Veit, Peter von Cornelius, Julius Schnorr von Carolsfeld, Friedrich Wilhelm Schadow and a loose grouping of other German-speaking artists. They met up with Austrian romantic landscape artist Joseph Anton Koch (1768–1839) who became an unofficial tutor to the group. In 1827, they were joined by Joseph von Führich (1800–1876).

The principal motivation of the Nazarenes was a reaction against Neoclassicism and the routine art education of the academy system. They hoped to return to art that embodied spiritual values, and sought inspiration in artists of the Late Middle Ages and early Renaissance, rejecting what they saw as the superficial virtuosity of later art.

In Rome, the group lived a semi-monastic existence as a way of re-creating the nature of the medieval artist's workshop. Religious subjects dominated their output, and two major commissions allowed them to attempt a revival of the medieval art of fresco painting. The first was a fresco series completed in Rome for the Casa Bartholdy (1816–17; moved to the Alte Nationalgalerie in Berlin), a collaborative project by the Nazarenes that "marks the beginning of the revival of fresco decoration for private and public buildings". This, and a second commission to decorate the Casino Massimo (1817–1829), gained international attention for the work of the "Nazarenes". However, by 1830 all except Overbeck had returned to Germany and the group had disbanded. Many Nazarenes became influential teachers in German art academies.

== Legacy ==
The programme of the Nazarenes—the adoption of what they called honest expression in art and the inspiration of artists before Raphael—was to exert considerable influence in Germany upon the Beuron Art School, and in England upon the Pre-Raphaelite movement. They were also direct influences on the British artists William Dyce and Frederick Leighton and Ford Madox Brown.

== Notable members ==
- Peter von Cornelius
- Josef Führich
- Johann Friedrich Overbeck
- Franz Pforr
- Friedrich Wilhelm Schadow
- Julius Schnorr von Carolsfeld
- Eduard Jakob von Steinle
- Philipp Veit
- Johannes Veit
- Ludwig Vogel
- Eugene von Guerard

== Other painters associated with the movement ==
- Carl Joseph Begas
- Karl von Blaas
- Ernst Deger
- Konrad Eberhard
- Carl Eggers
- Marie Ellenrieder
- Gebhard Flatz
- Matthias Goebbels
- Josef von Hempel
- Franz Theobald Horny
- Franz Ittenbach
- Gustav Jäger
- Leopold Kupelwieser
- Friedrich Lange
- Ferdinand Olivier
- Friedrich Olivier
- Johann David Passavant
- Carl Gottlieb Peschel
- Johann Anton Ramboux
- Theodor Rehbenitz
- Johann Scheffer von Leonhardshoff
- Ludwig Schnorr von Carolsfeld
- Johann von Schraudolph
- Joseph Anton Settegast
- Johann Michael Wittmer
- Giuseppe Hyzler and his brother Vincenzo Hyzler
  (1813–1849), from Malta

== See also ==
- German Romanticism
- Middle Ages in history
- Pre-Raphaelite Brotherhood
- Purismo
- Gabriel Wüger
