= History of Capri =

Coordinates: 40°33′N 14°14′E

The island of Capri is situated in the Gulf of Naples, between the Italian Peninsula and the islands of Procida and Ischia. Made of limestone, its lowest part is at the center, while its sides are high and mostly surrounded by steep precipices, which contain numerous caves. Its topography is dominated by the slopes of the Monte Solaro in the west and Monte San Michele in the east.

== Prehistory and Greek period ==
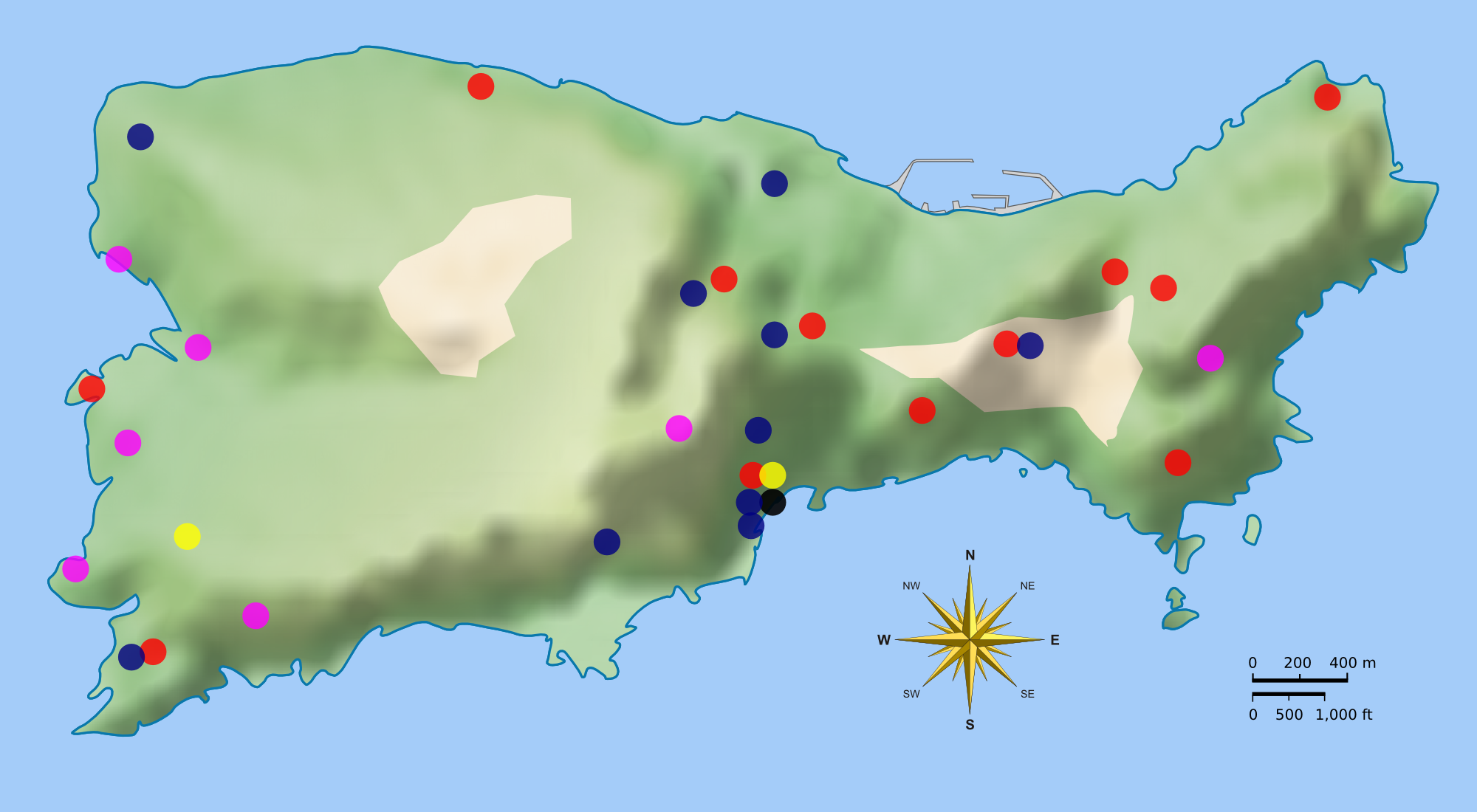
Prehistoric sites on Capri: Neolithic Chalcolithic Bronze Age Iron Age Pre- and protohistoric period

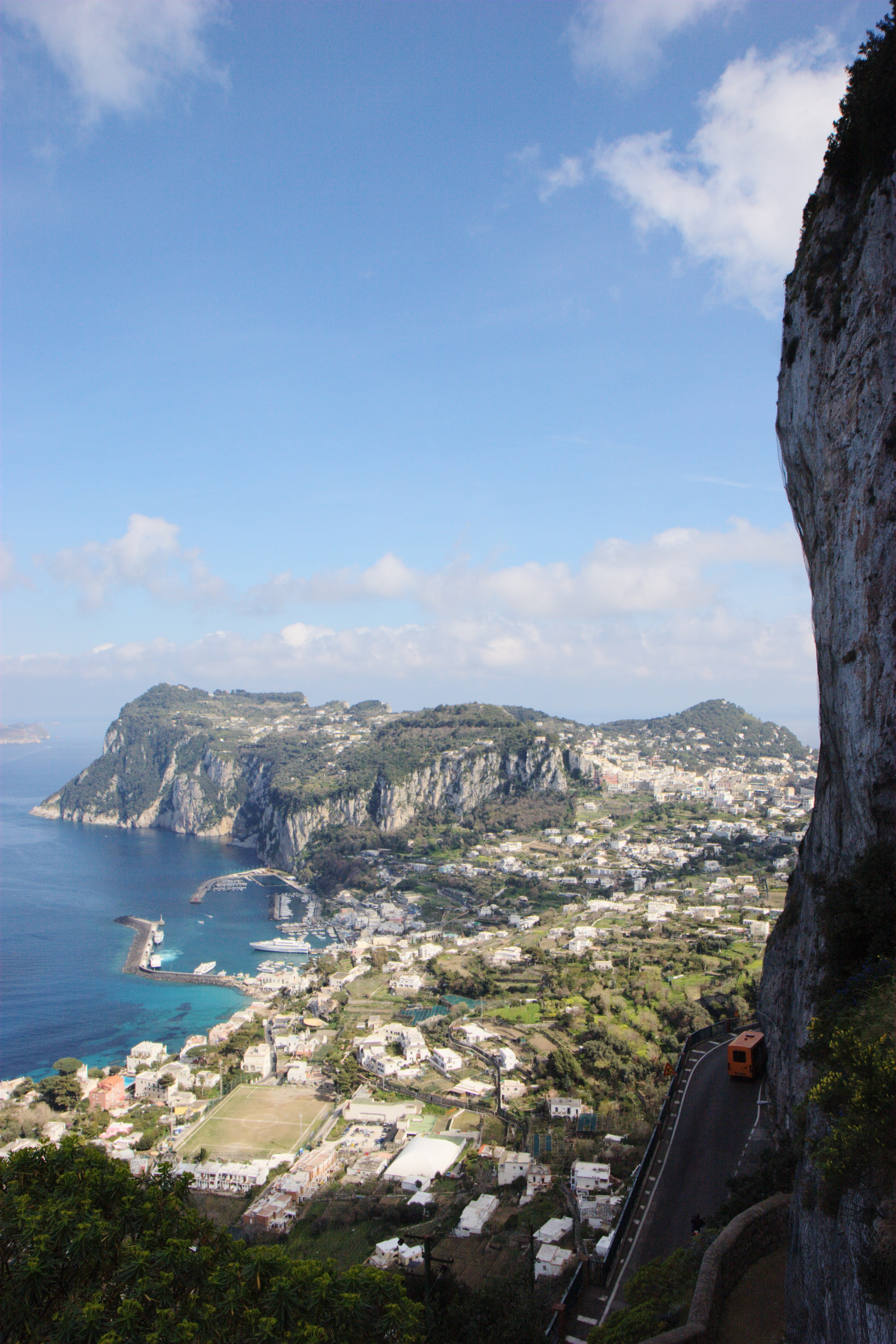
So-called Phoenician Steps

The first discoveries of prehistoric-age remains occurred more than two thousand years ago during the Roman Imperial era, when excavations for Imperial buildings on the island unearthed remains of animals that had disappeared tens of thousands before, as well as traces of Stone-Age occupants. The story was documented by the historian Suetonius (75–140) who described the interest shown by the emperor Augustus in preserving these remains, creating the first museum of paleontology and paleoanthropology in his villa's garden.

The earliest mythical inhabitants were the Teleboi from Acarnania under their king Telon. Neolithic remains were found in 1882 in the Grotta delle Felci, a cave on the south coast. In historical times the island was occupied by Greeks who from the 8th century BC onward first settled on the island of Ischia and the mainland, at Cumae, and later came to Capri. The historian Strabo wrote that "in ancient times there were two towns in Capri, which were later reduced to one".

One of those two towns was the precursor to today's Capri town. This is confirmed by the remains of fortification walls, built with large limestone boulders at the bottom and square blocks at the top, visible from the terrace of the funicular railway, and a building at the foot of Castiglione, and these, together with other buildings now destroyed, complete the old town (5th to 4th century BC).

Regarding the second city, many hypotheses have been advanced, but the most reliable is that even then it was Anacapri, based on the existence of the Phoenician Steps that connect to the port (despite its name, the steps were not built by the Phoenicians, but by Greek colonists).

Since its first settlement, the natural shape of the island led to the creation of two communities, one in the east with hills sloping down to the sea, and one to the west on a large plateau, the steep slopes of Monte Solaro and with no access to the sea.

Capri subsequently fell into the hands of Neapolis (the former Greek colony called Naples today) and remained so until the time of Augustus, who took it in exchange for Aenaria (Ischia) and often resided there.

== Roman period ==
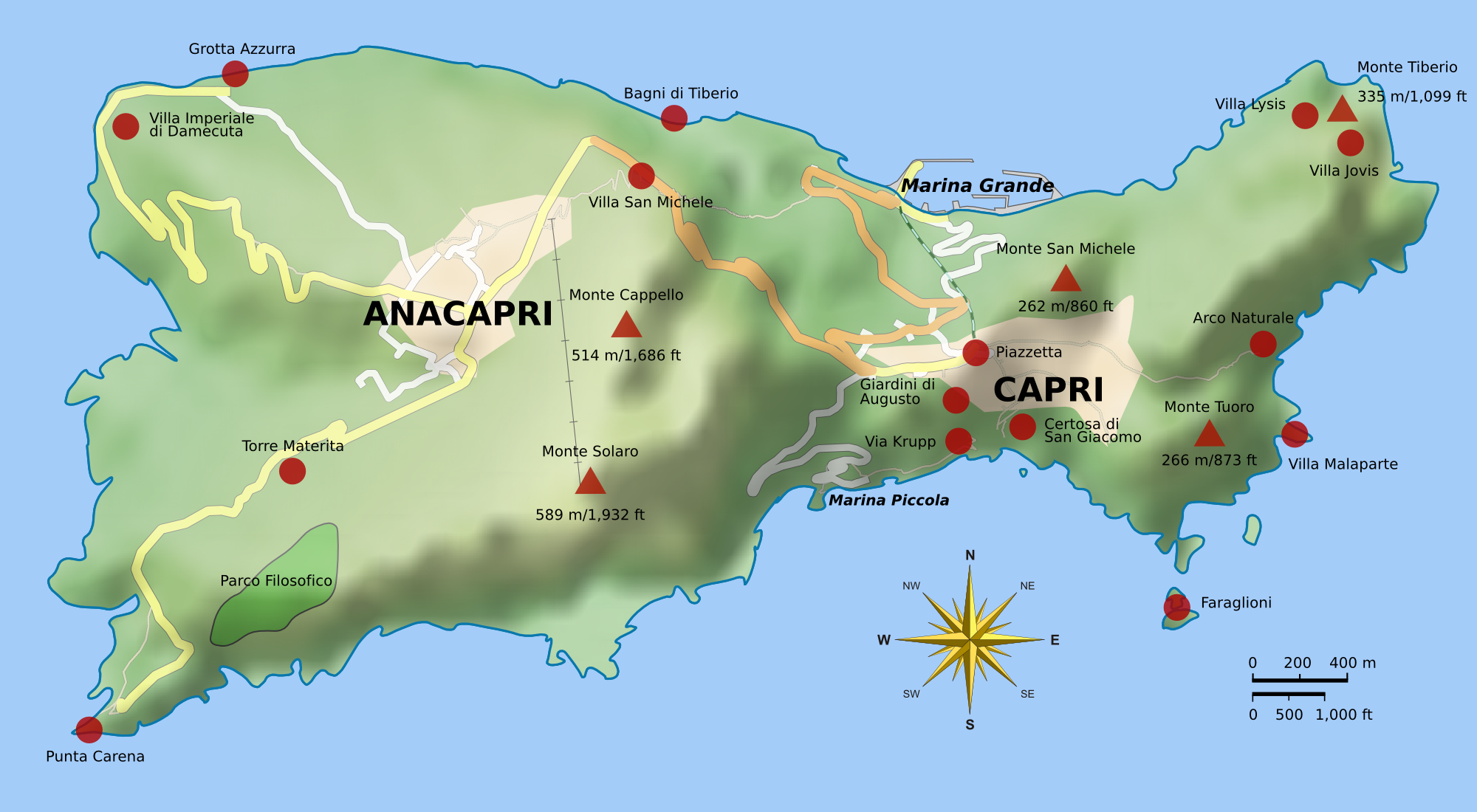
A topographic map of Capri showing the locations of some Tiberian villas

Tiberius spent the last ten years of his life at Capri and built twelve villas there, the best known being the Villa Jovis whose impressive remains are still visible. All these villas can be identified with more or less certainty the best-preserved being on Anacapri consisting of a large number of vaulted substructures and the foundations perhaps of a Pharos (lighthouse). These include the Palazzo a Mare, villa di Gradola which included the Blue Grotto and Villa Damecuta. Ruins of one at Tragara could still be seen in the 19th century. South of the Villa Jovis are remains of a watch tower used to communicate with the mainland.

The numerous ancient cisterns show that in Roman, as in modern times, rain provided the island's water since it has no natural springs.

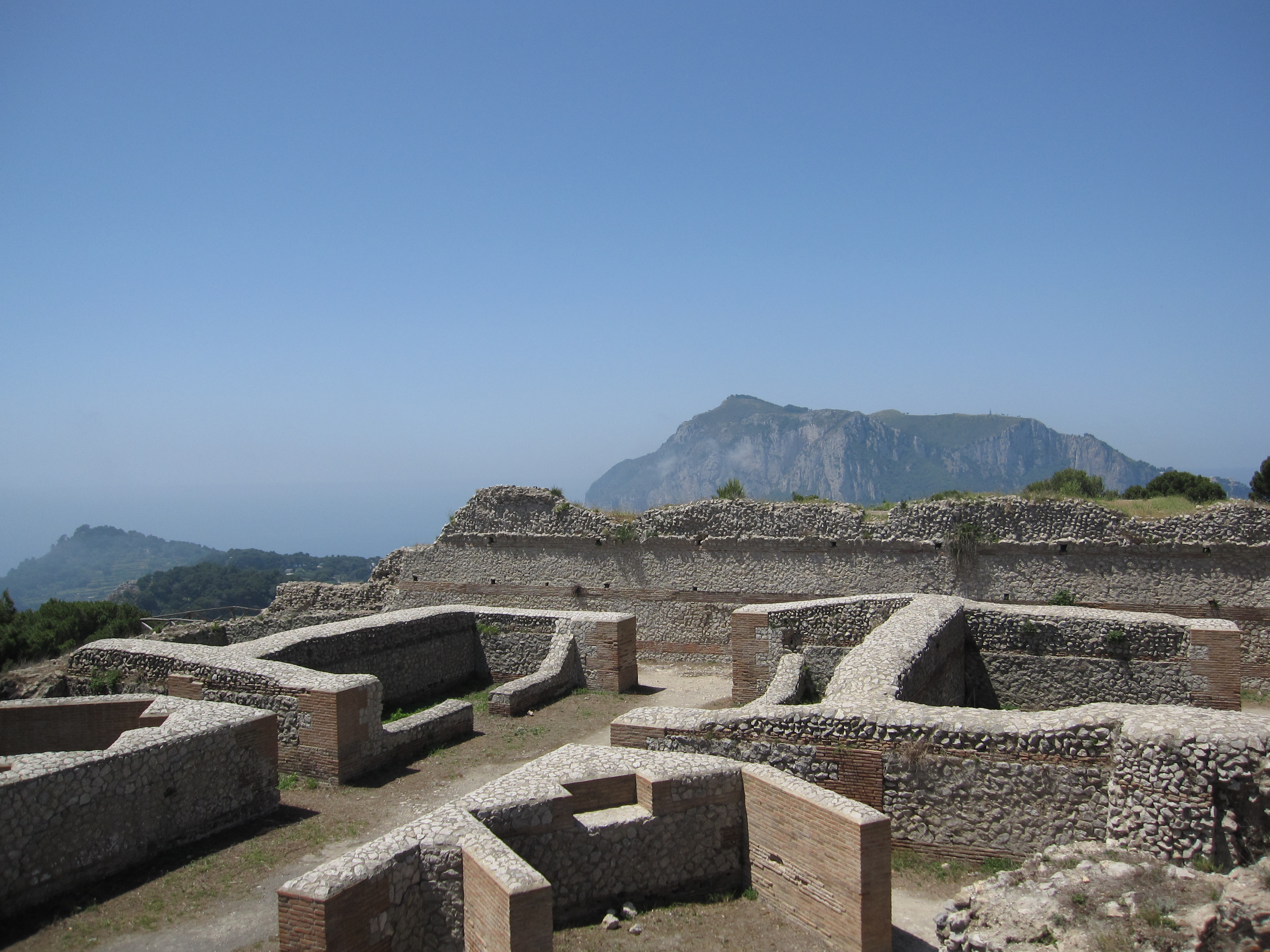
Ruins of Villa Jovis

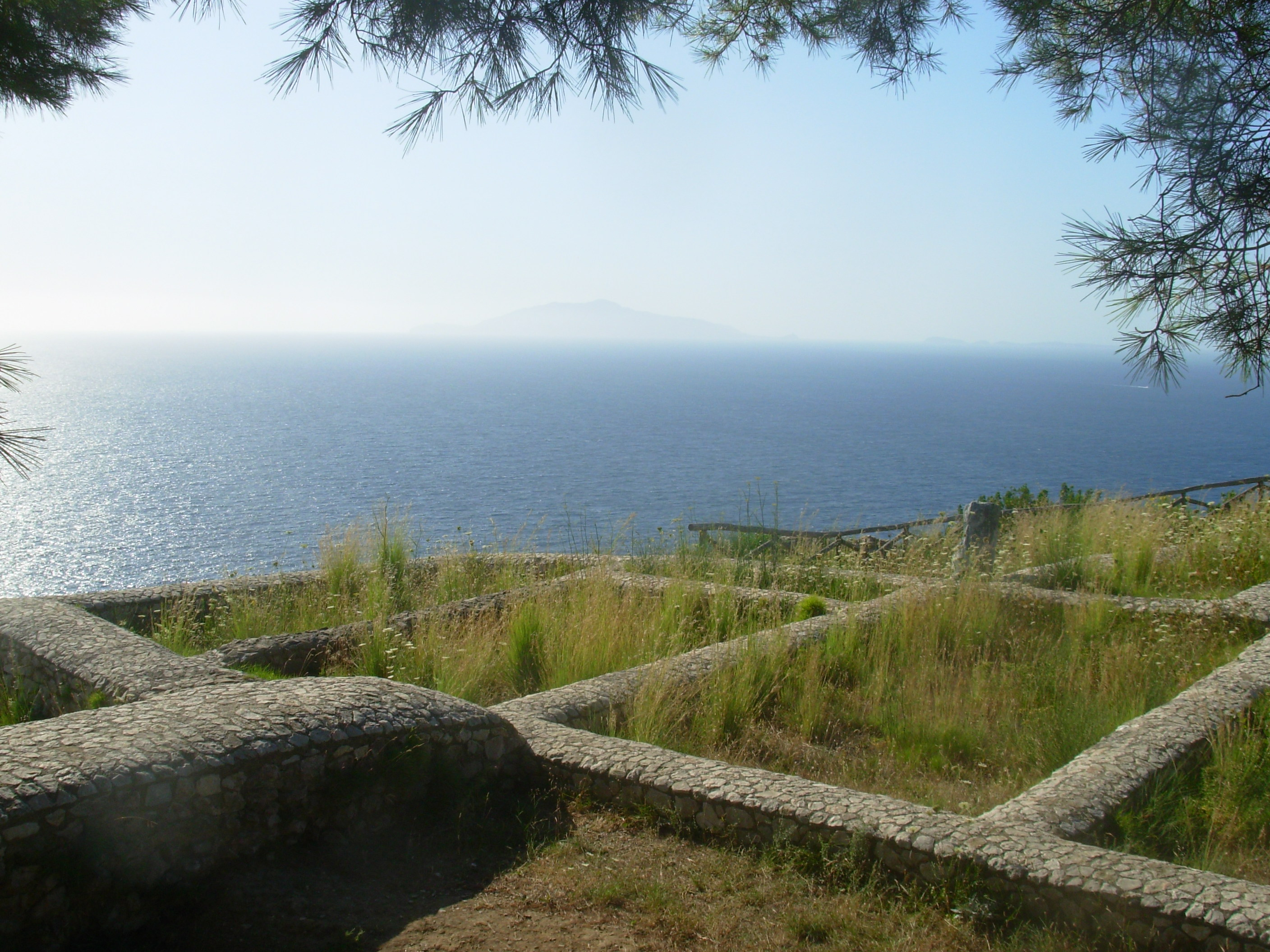
Villa Damecuta

Apparently the main motivation for Tiberius's move from Rome to Capri was his wariness with the political manoeuvring in Rome and a lingering fear of assassination. The villa Jovis is situated at a secluded spot of the island and the quarters of Tiberius in the north and east of the palatial villa were particularly difficult to reach and heavily guarded.

According to Suetonius, Villa Jovis was the scene of Tiberius's wild debauchery, but many modern historians regard these tales as merely vicious slander by his detractors. These historians believe that he lived a modest, reclusive existence on the island.

After Tiberius died, the island seems to have been little visited by the emperors, and we hear of it only as a place of banishment for the wife and sister of Commodus. The island, having been at first the property of Neapolis, and later of the emperors, never had any community with civic rights. Even in Imperial times, Greek was largely spoken there, as shown by both Greek and Latin inscriptions found on the island.

== Middle Ages to the 19th century ==
After the fall of the Western Roman Empire, Capri fell again under the rule of Naples, and suffered various attacks and ravages by pirates. In 866 Emperor Louis II gave the island to the comune of Amalfi. The political dependence of Capri to Amalfi, which had relations to the Eastern Mediterranean, is particularly evident in art and architecture, in which Byzantine and Islamic forms appeared. In 987 Pope John XV consecrated the first Caprese bishop.

Frederick IV of Naples established legal and administrative parity between the two settlements of Capri and Anacapri in 1496. Pirate raids by the Barbary corsairs reached their peak during the reign of Charles V. The medieval town was on the north side at the chief landing-place (Marina Grande), and to it belonged the church of S. Costanzo, an early Christian building. It was abandoned in the 15th century on account of the inroads of pirates, and the inhabitants took refuge higher up, in Capri and Anacapri. The pirate Barbarossa Hayreddin Pasha, called Barbarossa, plundered and burned Capri seven times. The worst raid occurred in 1535, when Barbarossa captured the island for the Ottoman Empire and had Anacapri castle burned down, the ruins of which are now called Castello Barbarossa. This castle is on the property of Villa San Michele today.) In 1553, a second invasion by Turgut Reis resulted in another capture and in the looting and destruction of Certosa di San Giacomo. The danger of such attacks led Charles V to allow the inhabitants to arm themselves, and new towers were built to defend the island. Only the 1830 French defeat of the pirates ended this threat.

A 17th-century visitor to the island was the French erudite libertine Jean-Jacques Bouchard, who may be considered Capri's first modern tourist. His diary, found in 1850, is an important information source about Capri.

In January 1806, French troops under Bonaparte took control of the island. In May 1806, the island was wrested from French control by an English fleet under Sir Sidney Smith, and strongly fortified, but in 1808 it was retaken by the French under Lamarque. By a simulated attack on the two docks of Marina Grande and Marina Piccola, British attention was diverted from the west coast, where the French were able to scale the cliffs and forced the enemy to surrender. In 1813 Capri, was restored to Ferdinand I of the Two Sicilies.

In the latter half of the 19th century, Capri became a popular resort for European artists, writers and other celebrities, such as Norman Douglas, Friedrich Alfred Krupp, Jacques d'Adelswärd-Fersen, Christian Wilhelm Allers, Emil von Behring, Curzio Malaparte, Axel Munthe, and Maxim Gorky. The book that spawned the 19th century fascination with Capri in France, Germany, and England was Entdeckung der blauen Grotte auf der Insel Capri (Discovery of the Blue Grotto on the Isle of Capri) by German painter and writer August Kopisch, in which he describes his 1826 stay on Capri and his (re)discovery of the Blue Grotto.

Also in the 19th century, the natural scientist Ignazio Cerio catalogued Capri's flora and fauna.

== 20th century ==
The island suffered little in the Second World War, but after the Italian armistice in September 1943, the island was held by a Fascist unit loyal to Benito Mussolini. The British No. 30 Commando (founded by Ian Fleming) led the assault on the island on 18 September and landed without any resistance but found that the Fascists were ensconced within Orrico Fort. After a few mortar rounds the garrison of around forty men surrendered and the island was thus consolidated.

During this period the island was frequented by Douglas Fairbanks Jr and Ernest Hemingway, both serving in the OSS and US Navy respectively.
