= Ernst Fries =

German painter (1801–1833)

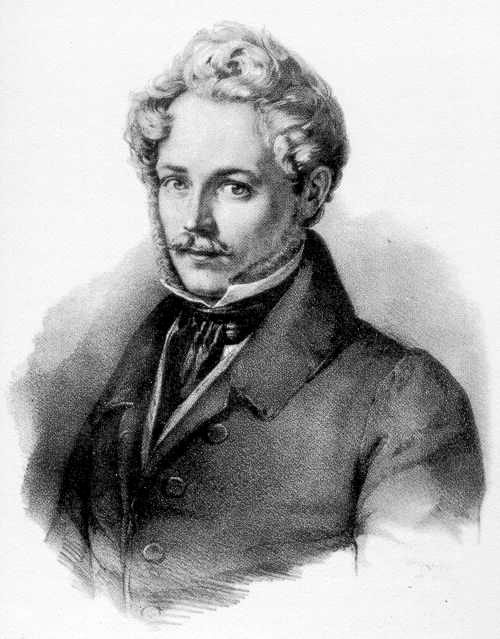
Self-portrait (c.1830), lithograph by Franz Hanfstaengl

Ernst Fries (22 June 1801, Heidelberg – 11 October 1833, Karlsruhe) was a German painter, draftsman, watercolourist, etcher, printmaker, and lithograph. Besides Karl Philipp Fohr and Carl Rottmann, he was the youngest of the so-called triumvirate of Heidelberg Romanticism. His works represent a transition from Romanticism to Realism.

== Life and work ==
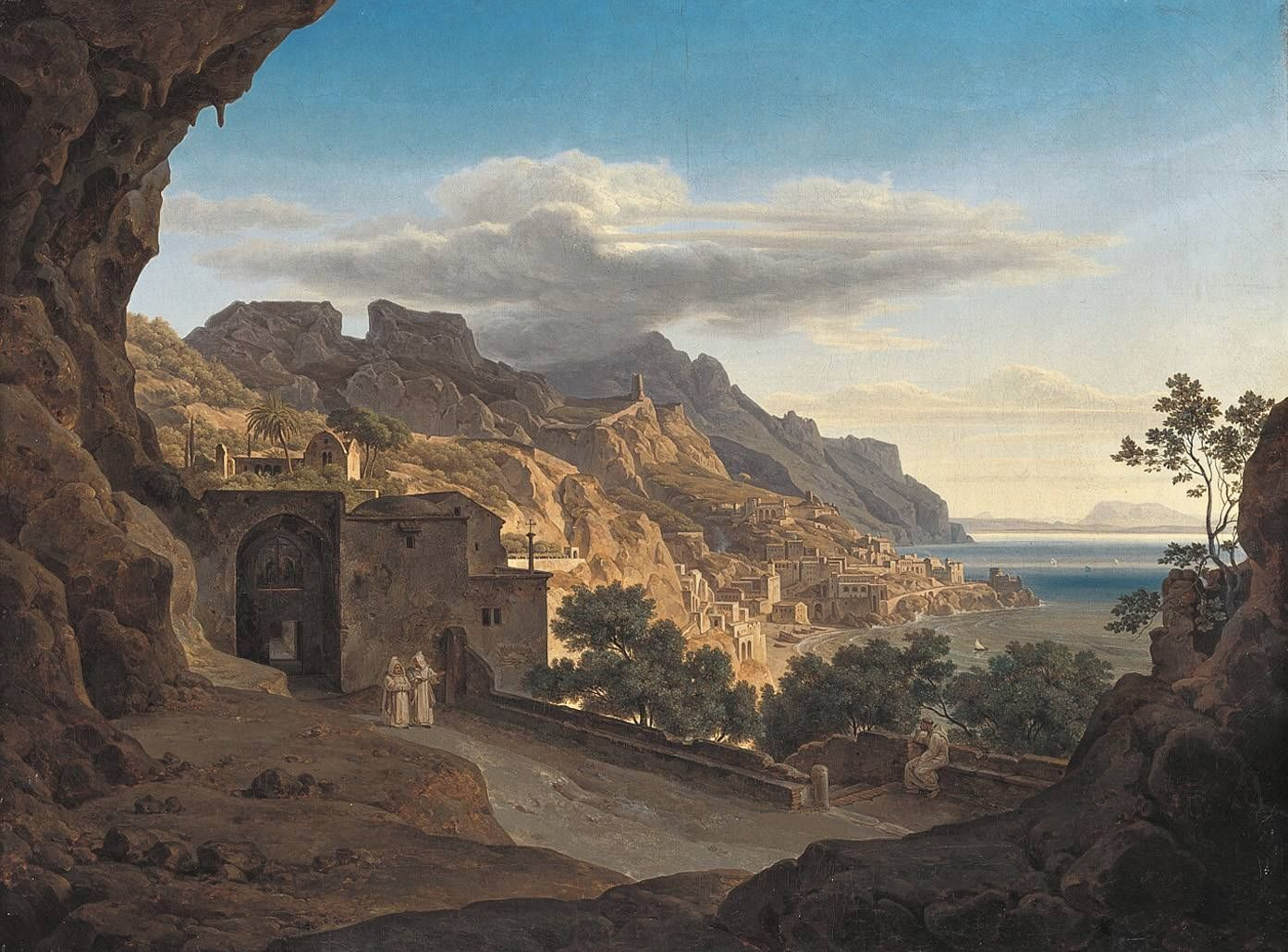
View of Amalfi

He was one of fifteen children born to Christian Adam Fries, a banker, dye maker, and art collector, and his wife Luisa Christina née Heddaeus (1781–1858), daughter of Philipp Christian Heddaeus, a church administrator. His family's affluence allowed him to travel freely and receive a thorough artistic education, without financial concerns. His much younger brothers, Wilhelm (1819–1878) and Bernhard, also became painters.

Beginning in 1810, he received together with Karl Philipp Fohr and Carl Rottmann lessons from Friedrich Rottmann, an engraver and designer who was known as the "University Sign Master" (Universitätszeichenmeister). After 1815, he studied with the landscape painter, Carl Kuntz, in Karlsruhe. He continued his studies in Munich for a short time then, in 1818, went to Darmstadt, where he took private lessons in perspective and architectural drawing from Georg Moller and simultaneously enrolled a study course in optics and perspective. In the spring of 1819, he started hiking through the surroundings of Darmstadt and the Odenwald, followed by a large series of tours through the valleys of the River Rhine and the River Neckar, the Bergstraße, and the mountain range of the Swabian Jura. Sketchbook after sketchbook was filled in these years, mostly with landscape drawings, like Malerische Ansichten des Rheins, der Mosel, des Haardt, und Taunusgebürges [sic] (ca. 1820) or Malerische Reise an der Mosel von Coblenz bis Trier. Nach der Natur gezeichnet von Fries…. (1821). At this point, he slowly came to prefer landscape painting and, from 1820 to 1821, enrolled in courses at the Academy of Fine Arts Munich.

He continued travelling extensively, throughout the Rheinland and the Tyrol, then undergoing the classical Grand Tour to Italy. From 1823 to 1827, he lived in Rome, where he created some of his most accomplished works. In Rome he came in contact to the Deutsch-Römer group of painters and met Josef Anton Koch and Friedrich Overbeck. In 1826 he started working with the French painter Camille Corot and "re-discovered" with the German writer August Kopisch the Blue Grotto (Capri) near Naples, a tour which was described in Kopisch's book Entdeckung der blauen Grotte auf der Insel Capri (Discovery of the Blue Grotto on the Isle of Capri) in 1838. Fries' numerous trips through the Roman Campagna and further regions of Italy are documented meticulously (with maps) by Sigrid Wechssler in her recent monography and catalogue raisonné. Upon returning to Germany, he settled in Heidelberg, and married, in 1829, Louise Stockhausen (1804–1857) in Neckargemünd; the couple had four daughters. 1830 Fries was in Munich, but relocated to Karlsruhe in 1831, when he received an appointment as grand-ducal court painter of Baden there. During his brief tenure, he painted a large number of vedute; both paintings and engravings.

He committed suicide by slitting his wrists in 1833, apparently while in a manic state, related to scarlet fever.

His works may be seen at most of the major museums in Germany, although the Kurpfälzisches Museum in Heidelberg has the largest collection, with around 180 paintings and engravings. Many of his works are also in a large private collection, owned by one of his collateral descendants.
