= Dusk =

Darkest stage of twilight

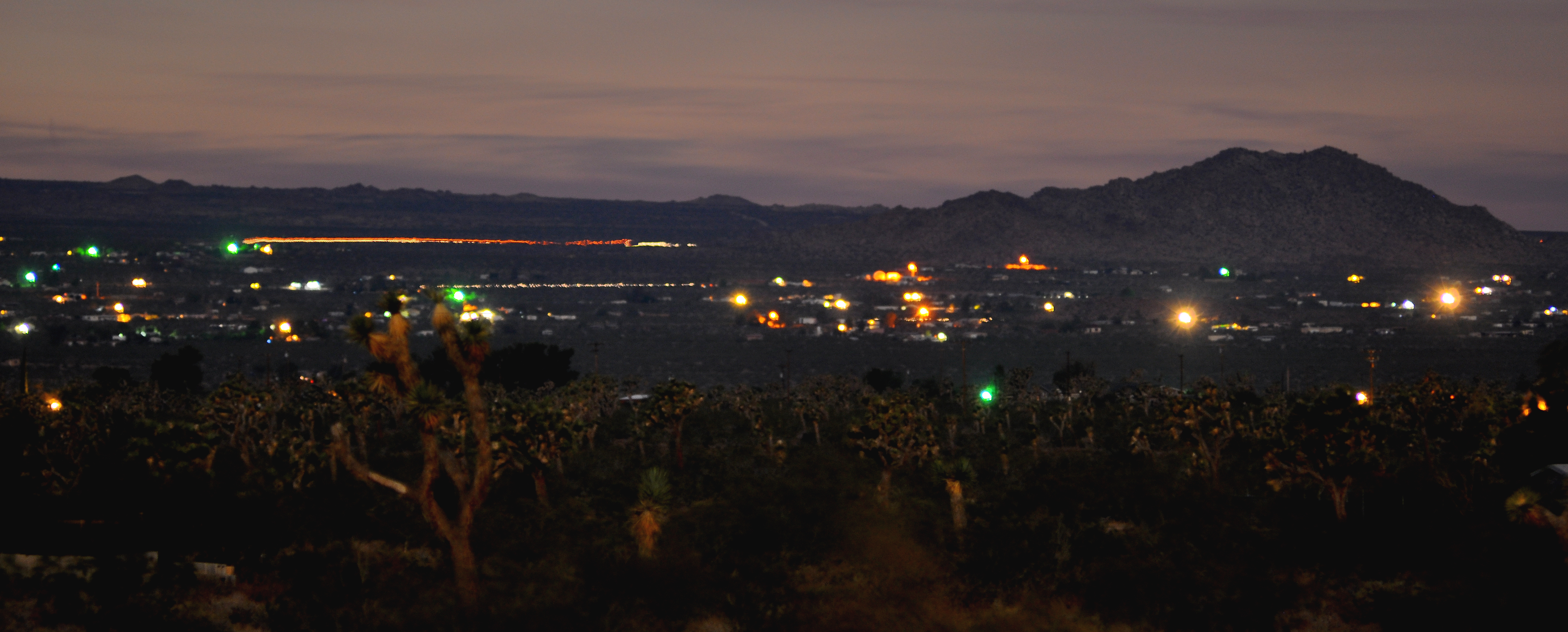
Landers, California at nautical dusk (20-second exposure)

Dusk occurs at the darkest stage of twilight, or at the very end of astronomical twilight after sunset and just before nightfall. At predusk, during early to intermediate stages of twilight, enough light in the sky under clear conditions may occur to read outdoors without artificial illumination; however, at the end of civil twilight (when Earth rotates to a point at which the center of the Sun's disk is 6° below the local horizon), such lighting is required to read outside. The term dusk usually refers to astronomical dusk, or the darkest part of twilight before night begins.

== Technical definitions ==
Civil, nautical, and astronomical twilight. Dusk is the darkest part of evening twilight.

The time of dusk is the moment at the very end of astronomical twilight, just before the minimum brightness of the night sky sets in, or may be thought of as the darkest part of evening twilight. However, technically, the three stages of dusk are as follows:

- At civil dusk, the center of the Sun's disc goes 6° below the horizon in the evening. It marks the end of civil twilight, which begins at sunset. At this time objects are still distinguishable and depending on weather conditions some stars and planets may start to become visible to the naked eye. The sky has many colors at this time, such as orange and red. Beyond this point artificial light may be needed to carry out outdoor activities, depending on atmospheric conditions and location.
- At nautical dusk, the Sun moves to 12° below the horizon in the evening. It marks the end of nautical twilight, which begins at civil dusk. At this time, objects are less distinguishable, and stars and planets appear to brighten.
- At astronomical dusk, the Sun's position is 18° below the horizon in the evening. It marks the end of astronomical twilight, which begins at nautical dusk. After this time the Sun no longer illuminates the sky, and thus no longer interferes with astronomical observations.

== Factors ==
Dusk timing varies depending on geography, climate, and season. Locations at higher latitudes experience prolonged dusk during summer because the Sun descends at a shallow angle below the horizon, while tropical regions—such as the Philippines—have much shorter dusk periods due to the Sun’s steep vertical path. Atmospheric factors like humidity, dust, and pollution can intensify dusk colors, producing vivid reds, oranges, and purples. Urban areas may appear brighter during dusk because of artificial light scattering, while rural and coastal regions often show clearer skies and greater visibility of stars during the later stages of twilight.

== Gallery ==
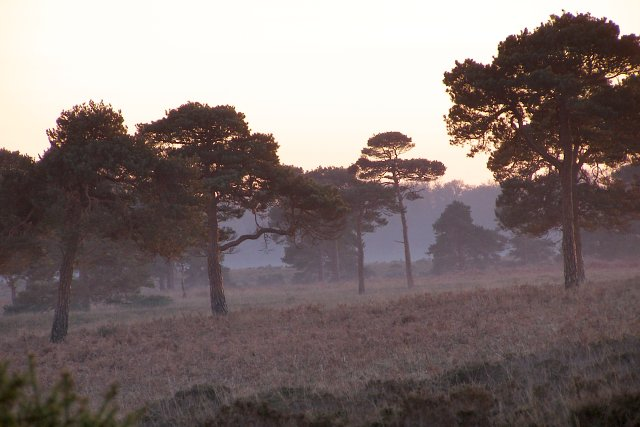
Scots pine at early dusk in New Forest, England

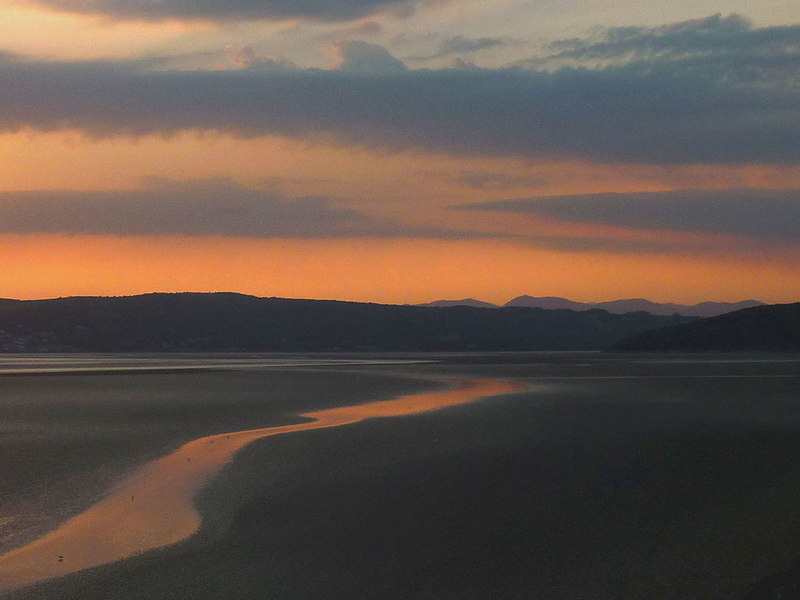
Dusk at the shore

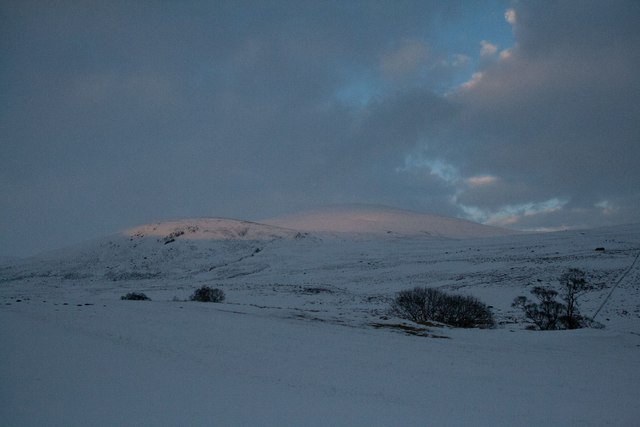
Looking eastwards at dusk

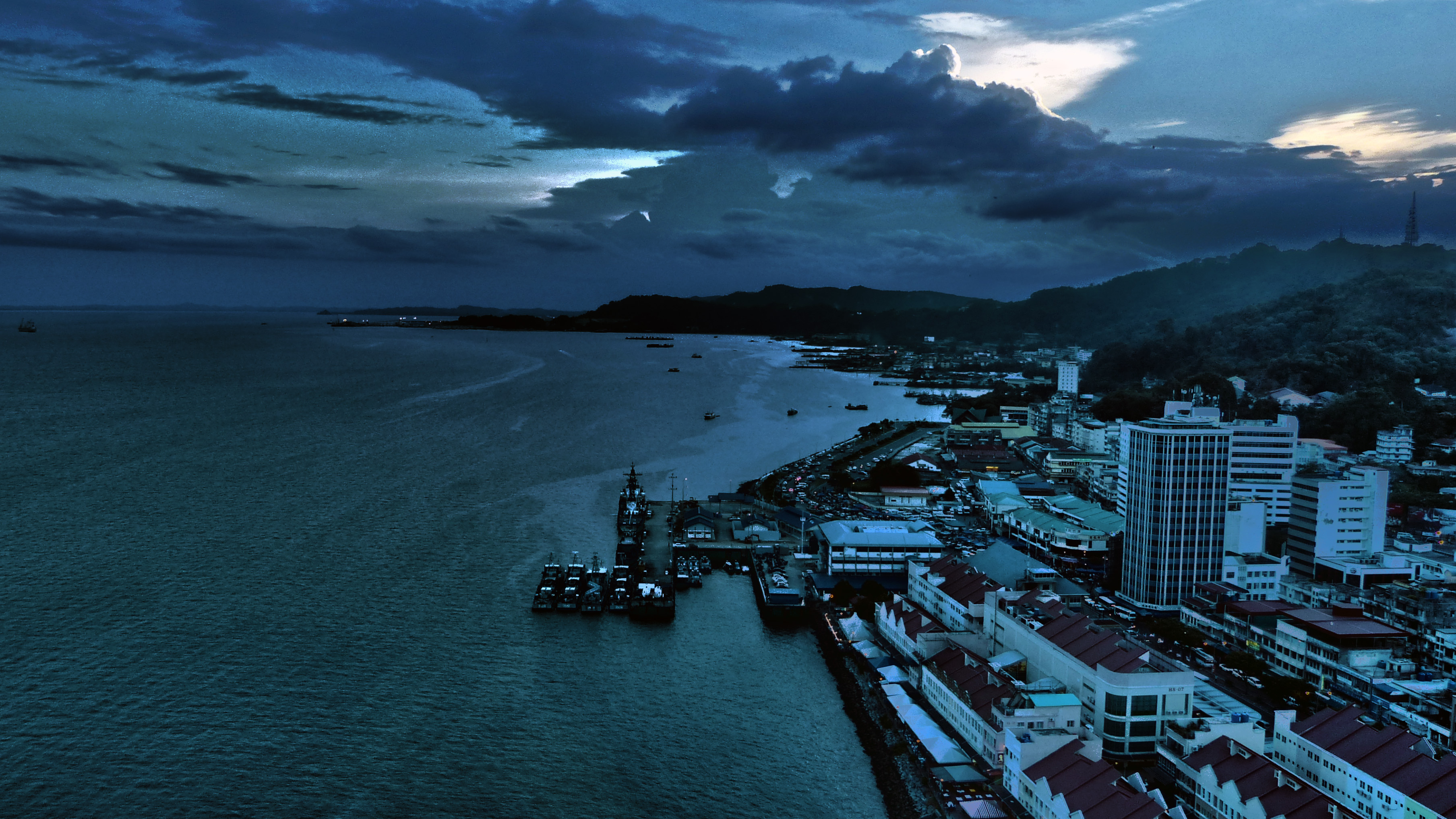
Sandakan, Malaysia at dusk

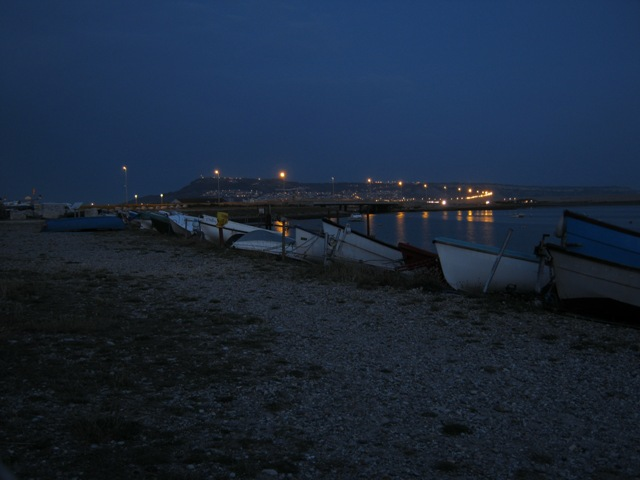
Beached boats at dusk

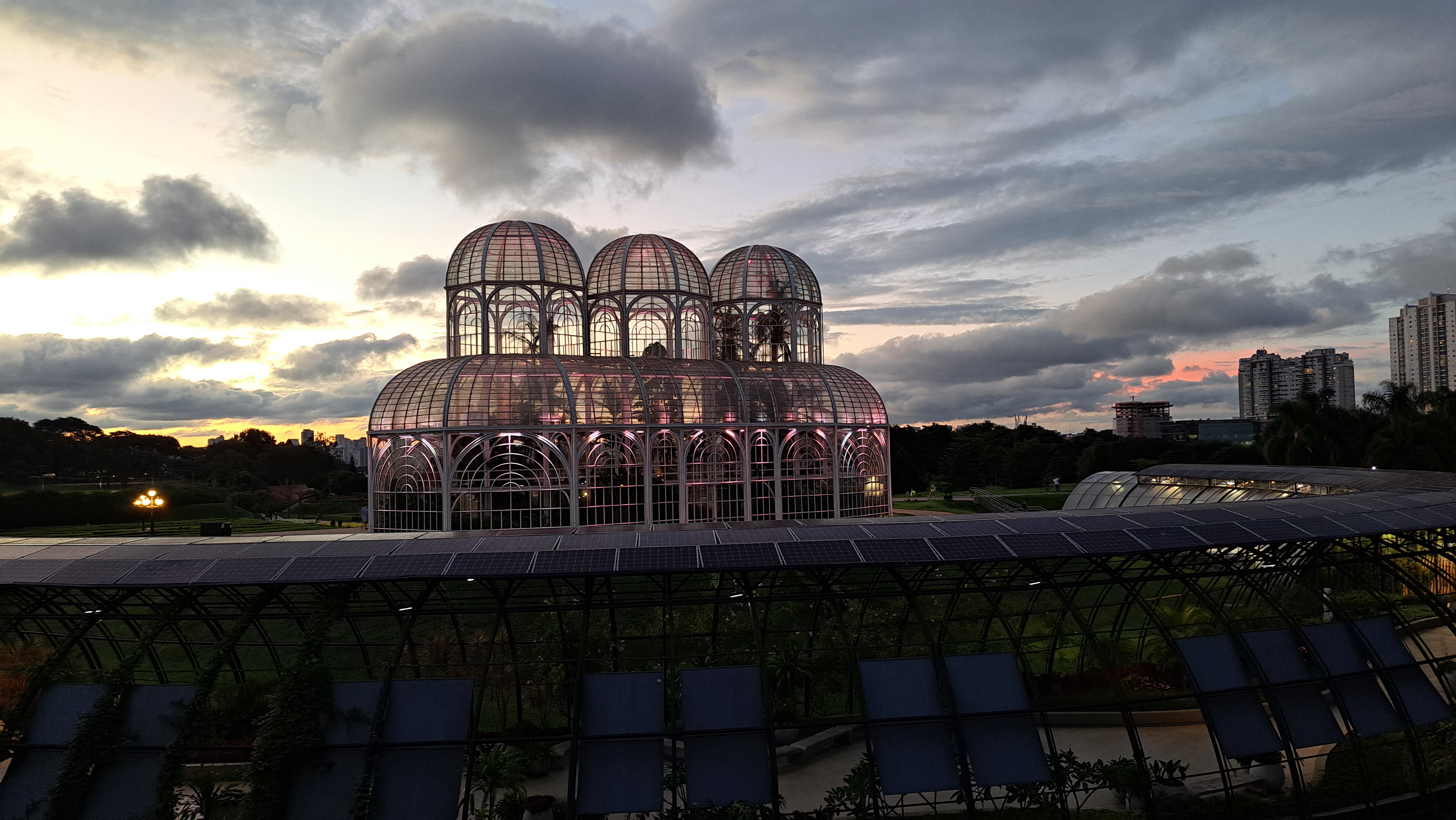
Curitiba at dusk, Brazil

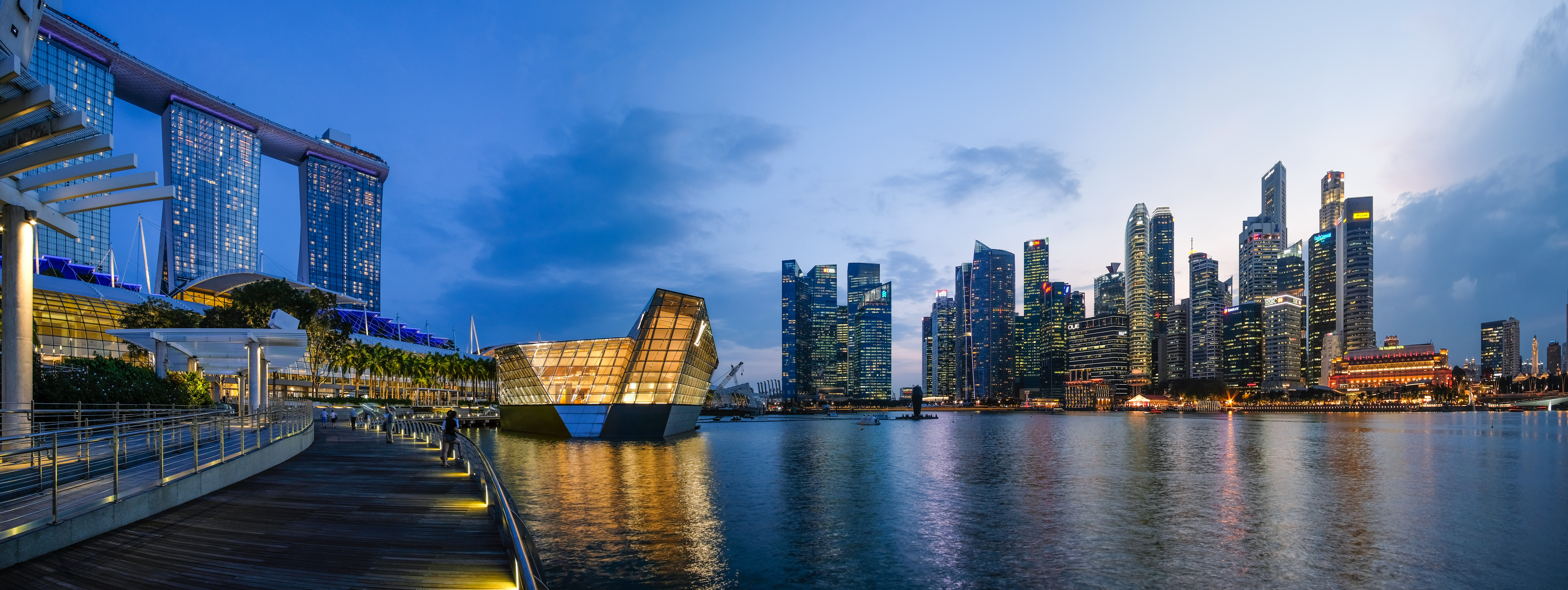
Nautical dusk in Marina Bay, Singapore

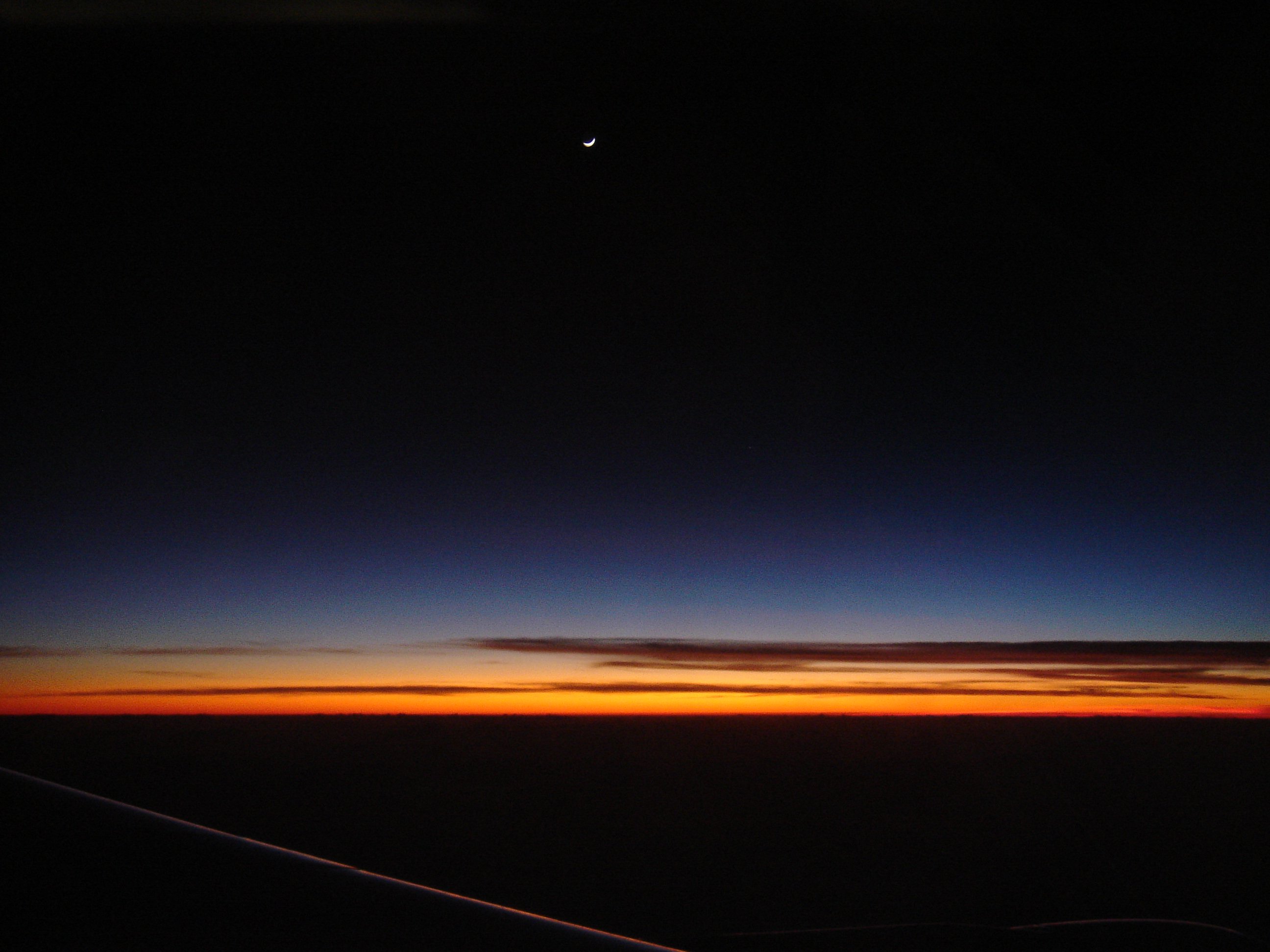
Astronomical twilight as seen from a plane window

== See also ==
- Dawn
- Effets de soir
- Sunrise
- Sunset
- Twilight
