= Grotta del Castiglione =

Cave in Italy

The Grotta del Castiglione is a cave high on a hill in Capri, Italy. The cave faces south, and was historically accessible from the east, although by 1903 the cliff had crumbled and destroyed the path. Access from the west was possible in the Roman era, but was subsequently destroyed as well. A 390-stair path connects the cave to Via Krupp.

The cave is believed to have been used since the neolithic age. Later, a Roman cistern and nymphaeum were built; these were modified or demolished in modern times. The cave was used as a refuge during Turkish raids of Capri.
