= Bernhard Fries =

German landscape painter (1820-1879)

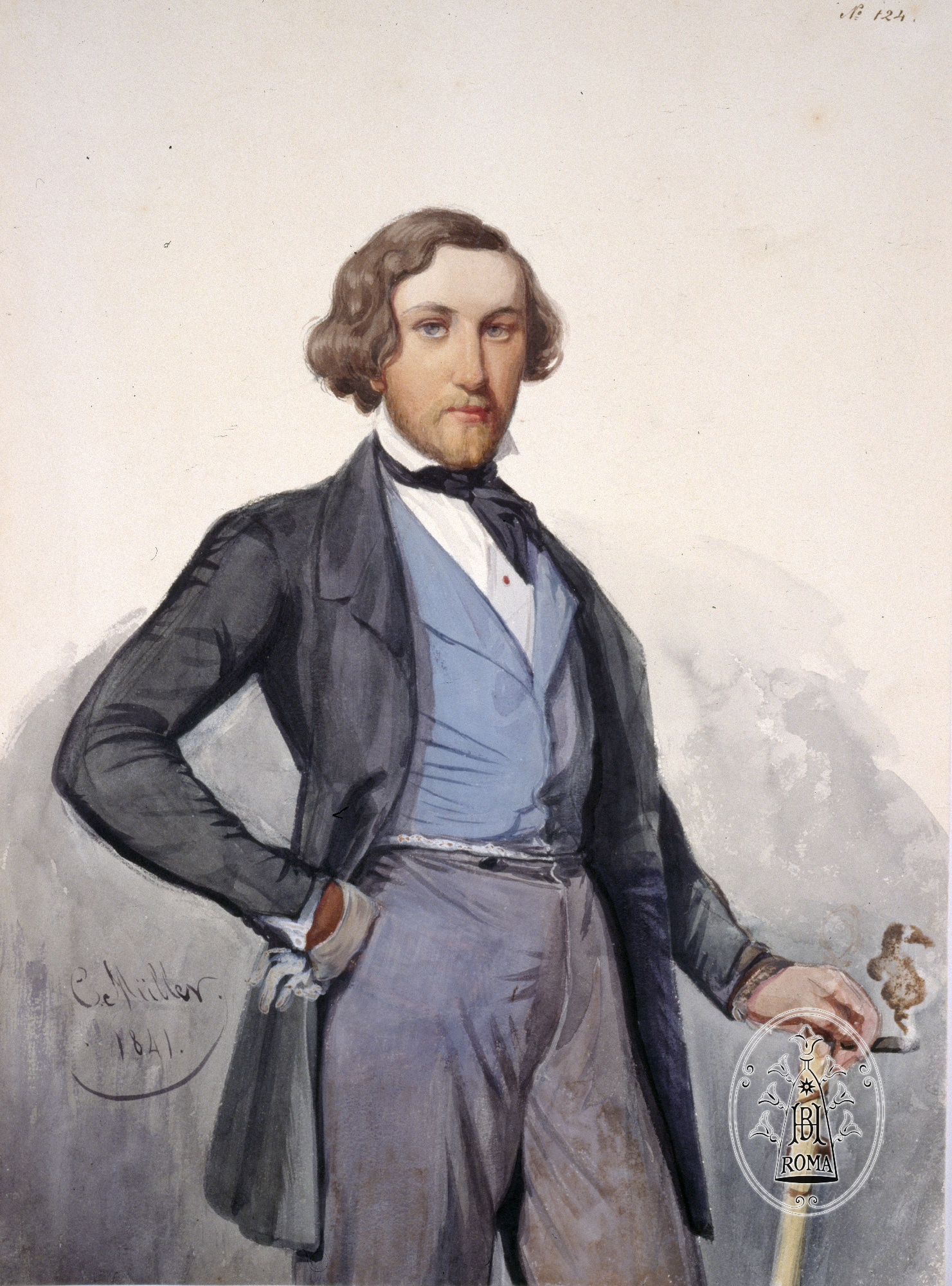
Bernhard Fries; portrait by Karl Müller (1841)

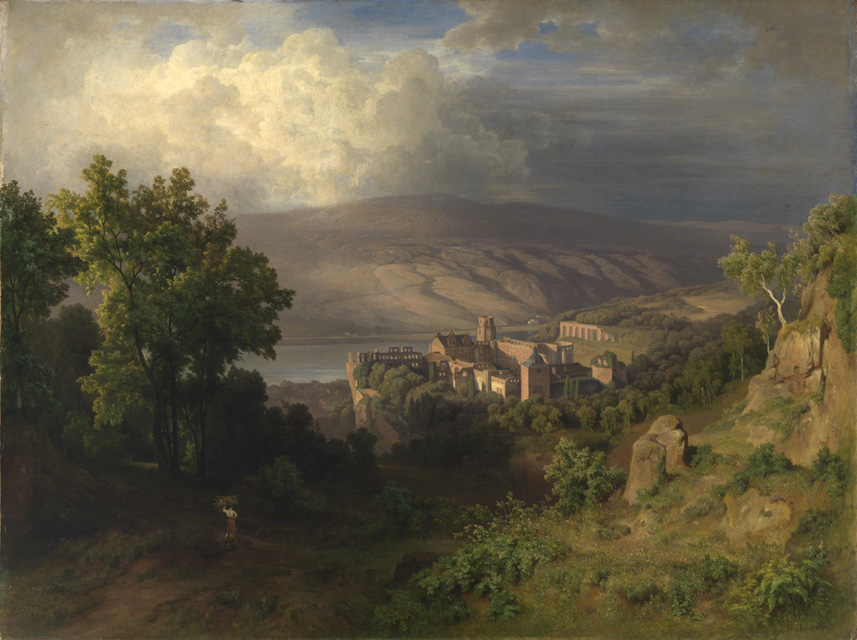
View of Heidelberg

Bernhard Fries (16 May 1820 – 21 May 1879) was a German landscape painter and draftsman. He is associated with the Düsseldorf school of painting.

== Biography ==
Fries was born in Heidelberg. He was one of fifteen children of the banker, dyer and art collector Christian Adam Fries [de] and his wife Luisa Christina née Heddaeus (1781–1858), daughter of the church administrator Philipp Christian Heddaeus. The family's prosperity allowed Bernhard to travel and work freely, without financial worries. The painter Ernst Fries (1801–1833) who was nineteen years his senior, was his brother. Bernhard was only thirteen when his brother died. In 1835, aged just fifteen, he received his artistic training from the history painter Carl Koopmann (1797–1894) in Karlsruhe, who had been a teacher of figurative drawing at the Karlsruhe Polytechnic since 1833. Also at an early age, Fries became aware of the Scottish painter George Augustus Wallis (his father's very valuable art collection comprised important Dutch painting of the period 1700–1800, paintings of Claude Lorrain, Poussin, Joseph Anton Koch, and several works by Wallis). Fries may also have met Wallis later in Italy on one of his travels.

Around 1835, Bernhard met Carl Rottmann in Munich, who had been a close friend of his older brother Ernst. November 1835, Fries enrolled at the Academy of Fine Arts in Munich in the subject "painting", but does not appear to have attended the academy very long. In 1837, aged seventeen and without the knowledge of his parents, Fries went to Italy, first to Venice, in 1838 he arrived in Rome. In Rome, Fries met the landscape artist Johann Wilhelm Schirmer, and stayed for a few years in Italy. Fries returned to Heidelberg in 1841 and moved to Düsseldorf in the fall of 1842, where he deepened his friendship with Schirmer, who in the meantime held a professorship for landscape painting at the Düsseldorf Academy. Until 1843, Fries was a pupil in Schirmer's landscape painting class at the Düsseldorf Academy. Accompanied by Andreas Achenbach and Adolf Carl, Fries traveled to Italy again in the fall of 1843, via Rome to Sicily (1844), turned back to Munich and Heidelberg in 1845. In 1846, Fries finally went to Paris, where he is said to have met artists from the Barbizon School. While continuing his unsteady life, he became involved in the revolution in 1848 and had contact with David Friedrich Strauss and Ludwig Feuerbach. Fries painted a portrait of the latter, which is now lost. Because of his political and revolutionary views as a democrat, he was expelled from Munich in 1852 and only returned in 1854. From 1860 onwards, he lived in Munich, but lost his financial independence due to the bankruptcy of his family in Heidelberg. His last major works include the cycle of 40 Italian landscapes (now in Munich) with views of Italy, created in the style of Carl Rottmann. Fries' Italian landscapes show careful composition and execution. After the completion of the series in 1866 he created the Italian views and Palermo Mamellen (in Schack Museum in Munich), Civitella, Garda, Rome, Naples, Palermo etc. as well as views of Heidelberg and motifs from the surrounding area. Fries died in Munich in 1879.

A rich collection of drawings and sketchbooks and some of the most important oil paintings showing southern Italian seaside landscapes between Rome and Naples as well as Palermo are in the private collection of a descendant. His paintings are represented in various museums, such as the great art galleries and museums in Darmstadt, Halle, Karlsruhe, Munich (Neue Pinakothek and Schackgalerie), Stuttgart and Zurich. The Palatinate Museum in Heidelberg has a comprehensive collection of works by Fries.
