= Carl Kuntz =

German painter (1770–1830)

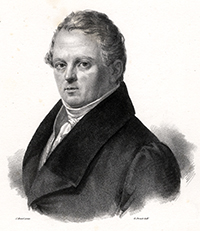
Carl Kuntz (1826)

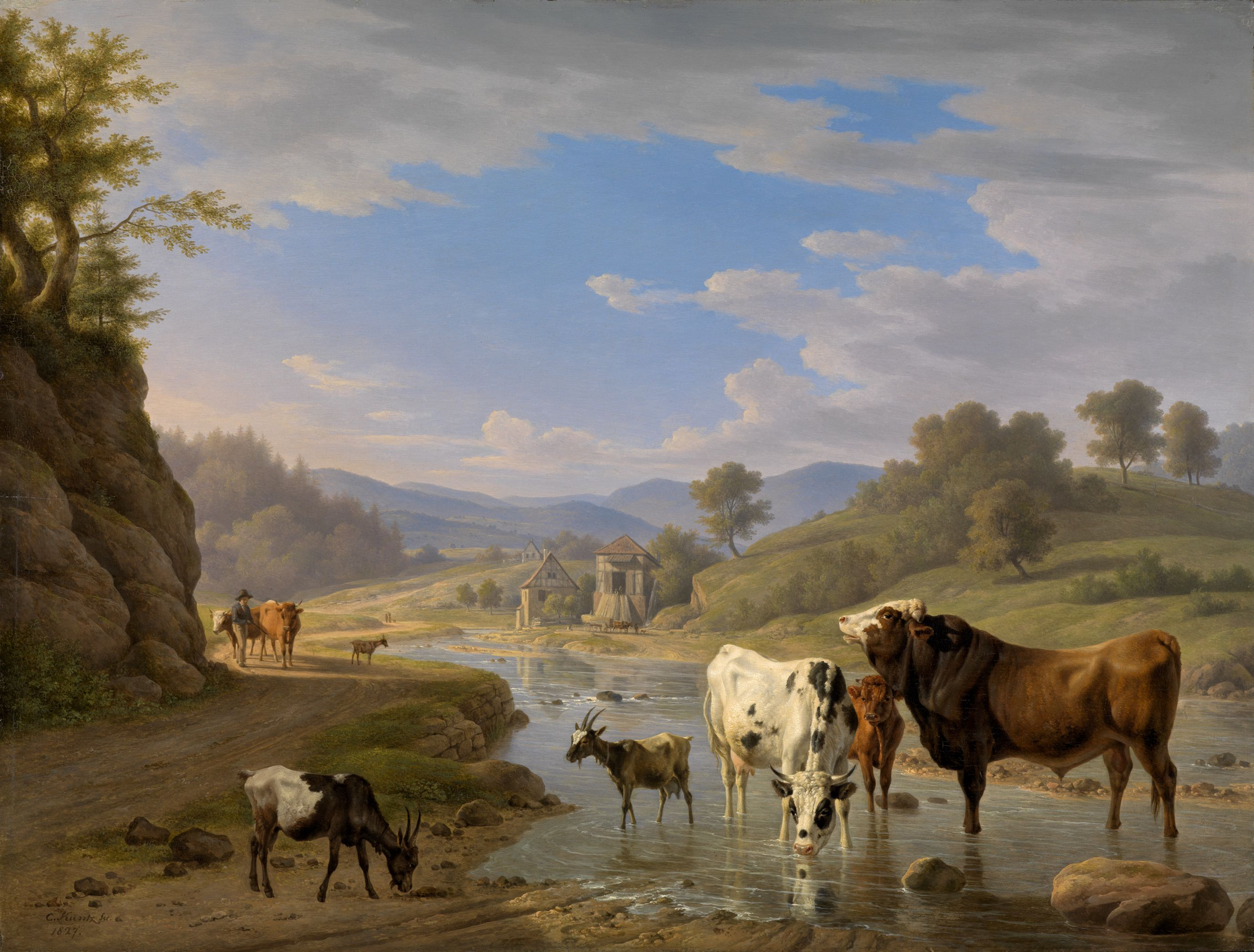
View of Geroldsau, in Baden-Baden, with animal staffage

Carl Kuntz (29 July 1770 – 8 September 1830) was a German landscape painter and etcher. Many of his works also feature animals.

== Life and work ==
Born in Mannheim, he attended the Mannheim Drawing Academy. There, he studied landscape painting, in the style of the Dutch Masters, with Johann Jakob Rieger. From 1791 to 1792, he travelled throughout Switzerland and North Italy. During that time he learned printmaking, and came to prefer what would later be called "painting en plein aire". After returning home, he launched his career with a portfolio of graphics called Schwetzinger Stiche (1793). He soon found permanent employment with the Chalkographische Gesellschaft (Chalcographic Society) in Dessau. He worked as a draftsman, but also made his own aquatints.

In 1804, efforts to prevent the closure of his alma mater, the Drawing Academy, had failed. Deprived of a potential position there, he made efforts to be appointed a court painter for the recently created Electorate of Baden. In 1806, after the Electorate had become the Grand Duchy of Baden, he was commissioned to decorate Bauschlott Castle, near Pforzheim, with landscapes. He became a court painter in 1808, and moved to Karlsruhe, where he created scenes of Lake Constance at the Markgräfliches Palais. Four years later, he was chosen to give drawing lessons to Grand Duchess Stephanie.

He began featuring animals in his paintings after 1815, when he made a copy of a painting by Paulus Potter ("Spring Morning") that proved to be very popular with the nobility. In 1818, he was one of the co-founders of the Badischer Kunstverein (artists' association). In 1829, Grand Duke Louis appointed him Director of the Royal Gallery, but he died after holding that position for only a year.

His students included his own sons, Rudolf and Ludwig, as well as Ernst Fries, from Heidelberg. He had two other sons; Konrad, an administrative lawyer, and Gustav (1807–1886), an army officer.

== Sources ==
- Constantin von Wurzbach: "Kuntz, C.." In: Biographisches Lexikon des Kaiserthums Oesterreich (Biographical Lexicon of the Empire of Austria). Part 13 Kaiserlich-königliche Hof- und Staatsdruckerei, Vienna 1865, p. 390 (digitalised).
- Alfred Woltmann: Karl Kuntz. In: Badische Biographien. 1875, Part 1, pp. 487/488 (Online).
- "Kuntz, Karl" . Allgemeine Deutsche Biographie (in German). Vol. 17. Leipzig: Duncker & Humblot. 1883. p. 397.
- "Kuntz, Carl", In: Allgemeines Lexikon der Bildenden Künstler von der Antike bis zur Gegenwart, Vol. 22: Krügner–Leitch, E. A. Seemann, Leipzig, 1928 pp. 114–116
- Lieselotte Benedict (1982). "Kuntz, Carl". Neue Deutsche Biographie (in German). Vol. 13. Berlin: Duncker & Humblot. p. 305. (full text online).
