= Effets de soir =

Type of light effects that have appeared in artworks

Effets de soir (also called effets de soir et de matin) are the effects of light caused by the sunset, twilight, or darkness of the early evening or matins. They appear frequently in works by such painters as Vincent van Gogh, Bernhard Fries, Armand Guillaumin, and Camille Corot. Literally, it means "effects of evening" in French.

This was part of a group of techniques used by Impressionists such as impasto, en plein air, color theory, and thick strokes of oil paint on canvas.

In 2008, the Museum of Modern Art curated a major exhibit of van Gogh's work of effets de soir. The exhibit included such iconic paintings as The Potato Eaters, The Sower (Van Gogh), Starry Night Over the RhoneThe Starry Night, and The Night Cafe.

== See also ==
- Blue hour
- Twilight

== Gallery of images ==
All of the following are by Vincent van Gogh, unless otherwise noted:

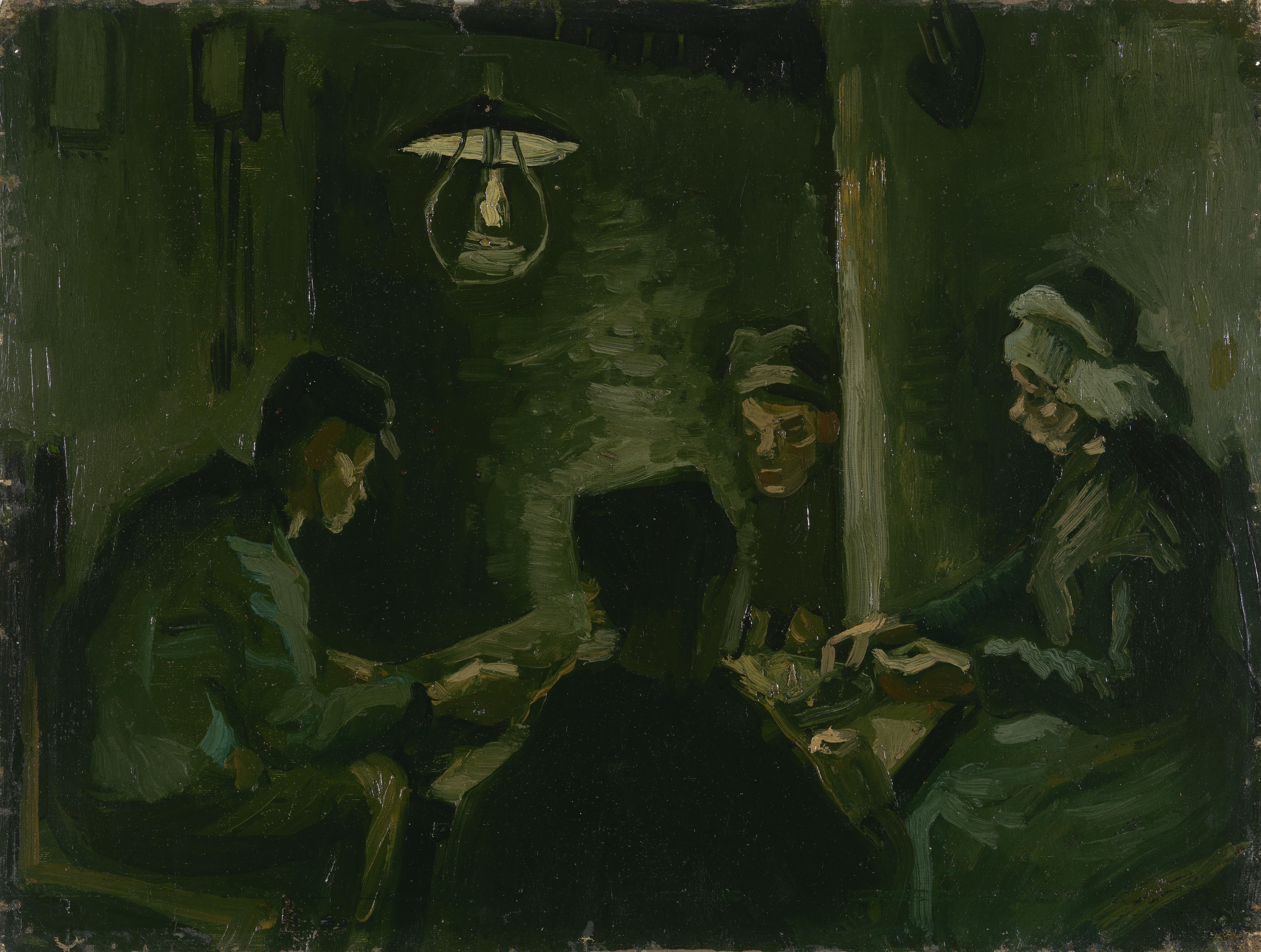
Study for The Potato Eaters

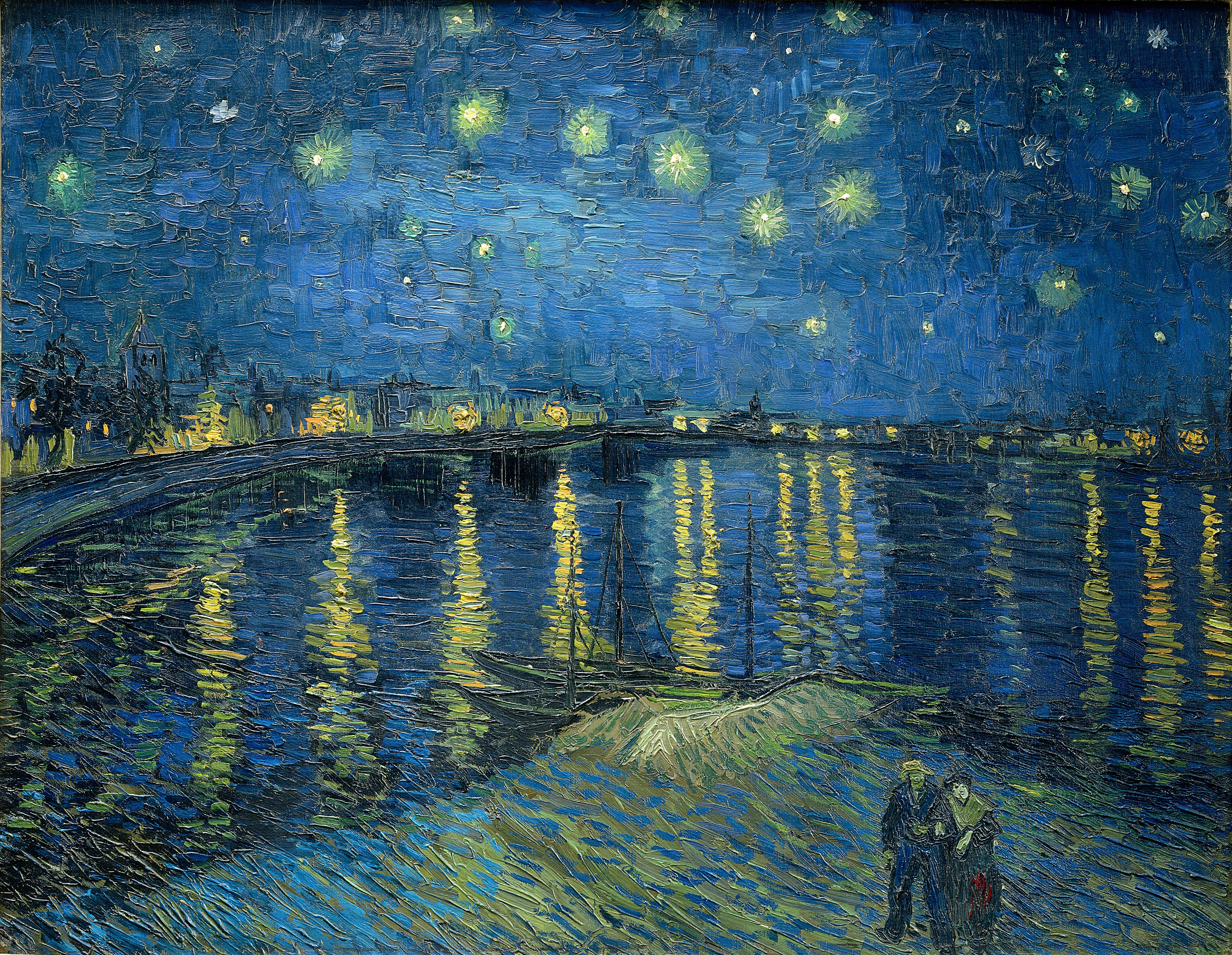
Starry Night Over the Rhone

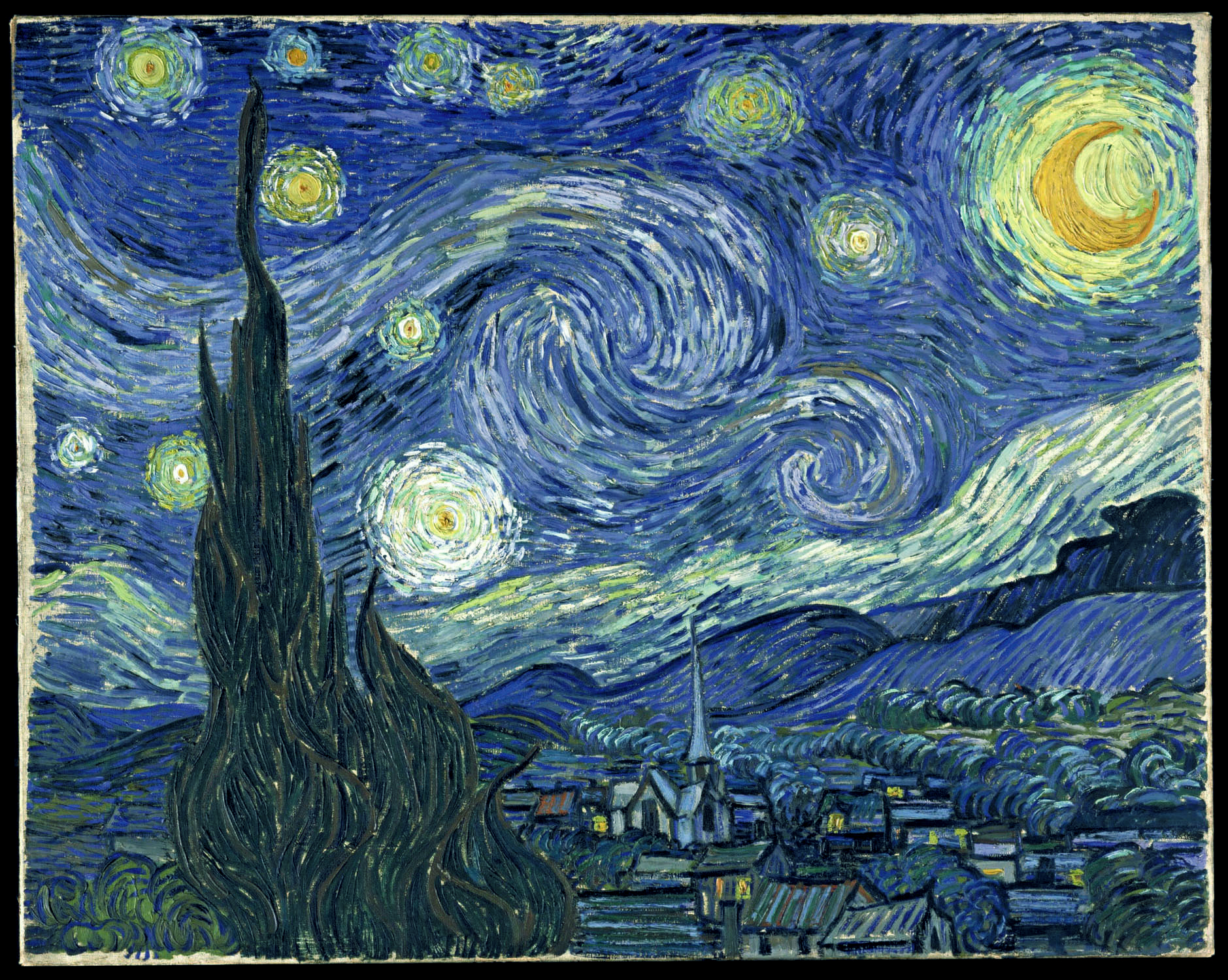
The Starry Night

The Night Cafe

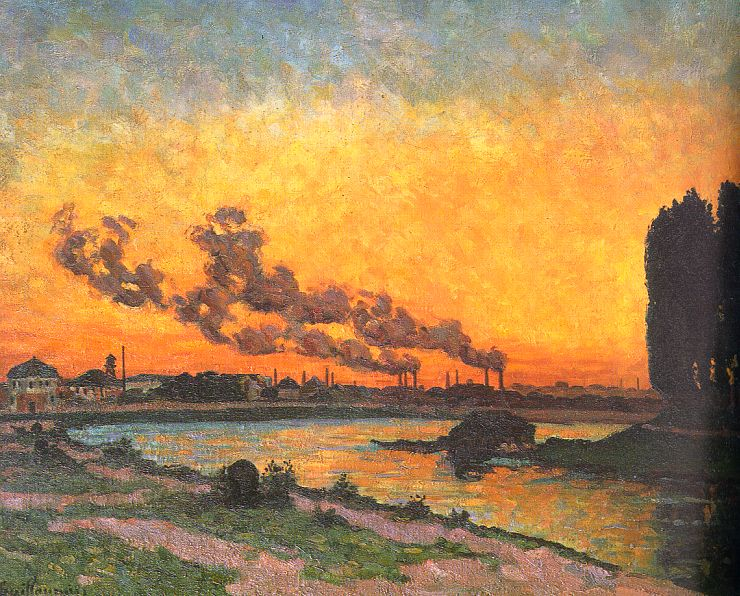
Armand Guillaumin, (1841-1927), Sunset at Ivry (Soleil couchant à Ivry)
