= August Kopisch =

German poet and painter (1799–1853)

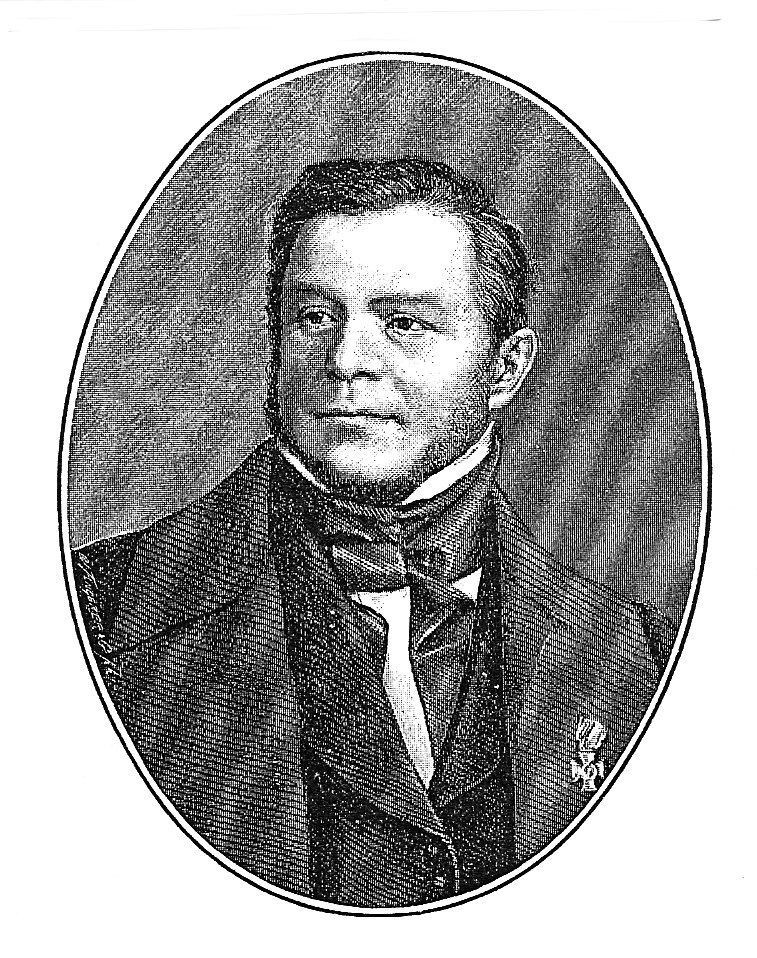
August Kopisch

August Kopisch (26 May 1799 – 6 February 1853) was a German poet and painter.

== Biography ==
Kopisch was born on 26 May 1799 in Breslau, Prussia (now Wrocław, Poland). In 1815 he began studying painting at the Prague academy, but an injury to his hand damaged his prospects of success as an artist, and he turned to literature.

After residences in Dresden and Vienna Kopisch proceeded in 1822 to Italy. At Naples he became close friends with the poet August von Platen-Hallermünde; and when out swimming he and the painter Ernst Fries discovered the "Blue Grotto" of Capri.

In 1828 he settled at Berlin and was granted a pension by Frederick William IV of Prussia, who in 1838 conferred upon him the title of professor.

In 1847 he moved to Potsdam and wrote an account of royal residences there and in the neighborhood.

He died on 6 February 1853 at Berlin.

== Works ==
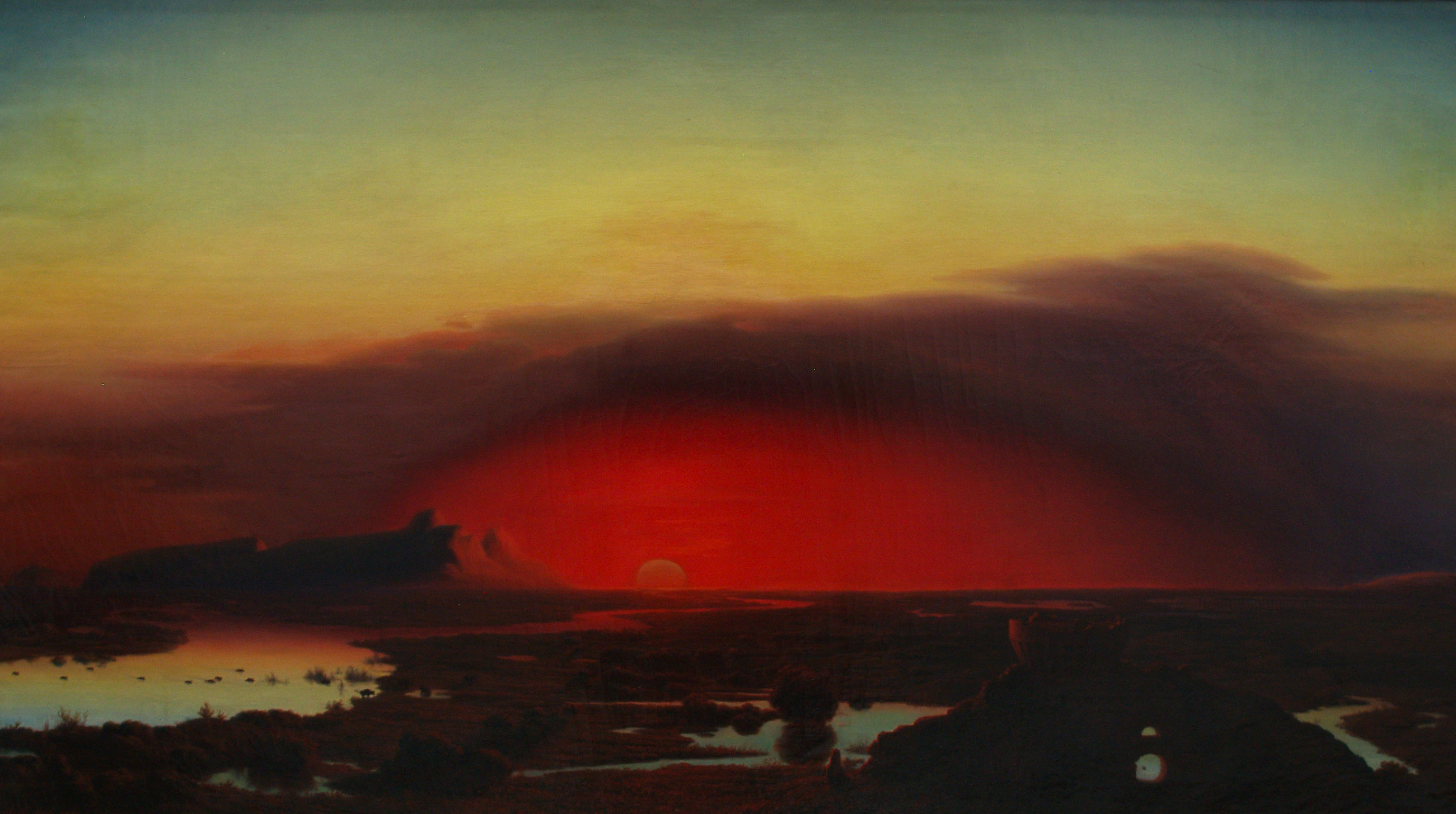
The Pontine Marshes at Sunset (1848 painting)

Kopisch produced some original poetry, light in language and in form. He specialised in re-telling legends and popular subjects, and among his Gedichte (Berlin, 1836) are some naïve and humorous little ballads such as Die Historie von Noah, Die Heinzelmännchen zu Köln, Das grüne Tier and Der Schneiderjunge von Krippstedt, which became popular.

He also published a translation of Dante's Divine Comedy (Berlin, 1840), and under the title Agrumi (Berlin, 1838) a collection of translations of Italian folk songs.

=== Literature ===
- Agrumi, volksthümliche Posien aus allen Mundarten Italiens und seiner Inseln. Crantz Verlag, Berlin 1838.
- Allerlei Geister. Gedichte und Erzählungen. Mörike Verlag, München 1913 (mit der Ballade Die Heinzelmännchen zu Köln)
- Dieter Richter (Hrsg.): Entdeckung der blauen Grotte auf der Insel Capri. Wagenbach Verlag, Berlin 1997, ISBN 3-8031-1163-3
- Die göttliche Komödie des Dante Alighieri. Metrische Uebersetzung nebst beigedrucktem Originaltexte. Brachvogel & Raubtiere, ist sehr berühmt geworden.
- Gedichte (1836)
- Die Heinzelmännchen zu Köln. Emons, Köln 2007, ISBN 978-3-89705-493-6.
- Ein Karnevalsfest auf Ischia. Hausen, Saarlouis 1892.
- Die königlichen Schlösser und Gärten zu Potsdam. Von der Zeit ihrer Gründung bis zum Jahre 1852. Ernst & Korn, Berlin 1854.
- Mein allererstes Märchenbuch: Die Heinzelmännchen zu Köln. Edition Paletti, Köln 2004, ISBN 3-89893-892-1.
- Der Träumer. Hübener, Berlin 1948.
- Carl Böttcher (Hrsg.): Gesammelte Werke (Collected works). Weidmann, Berlin 1856 (5 Bde.)

- Der Krater des Vesuvs mit der Eruption von 1828 (1828)
- Ein Schiff auf dem Meere von Delphinen umschwärmt
- Die Pontinischen Sümpfe (1848)
