= Blue Grotto (Capri) =

Sea cave on the coast of Capri, Italy

Coordinates: 40°33′39.6″N 14°12′20.5″E

Grotta Azzurra
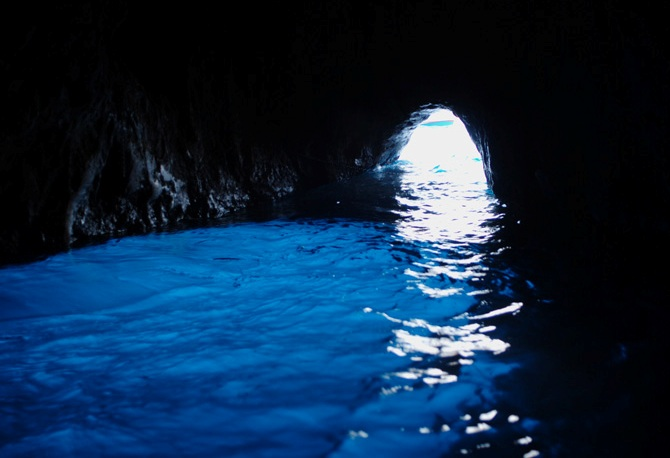
- Inside the Blue Grotto
- Interactive map of Grotta Azzurra
- Location: Anacapri (NA, Campania, Italy)
- Length: 54 m
- Geology: Sea cave
- Entrances: 1

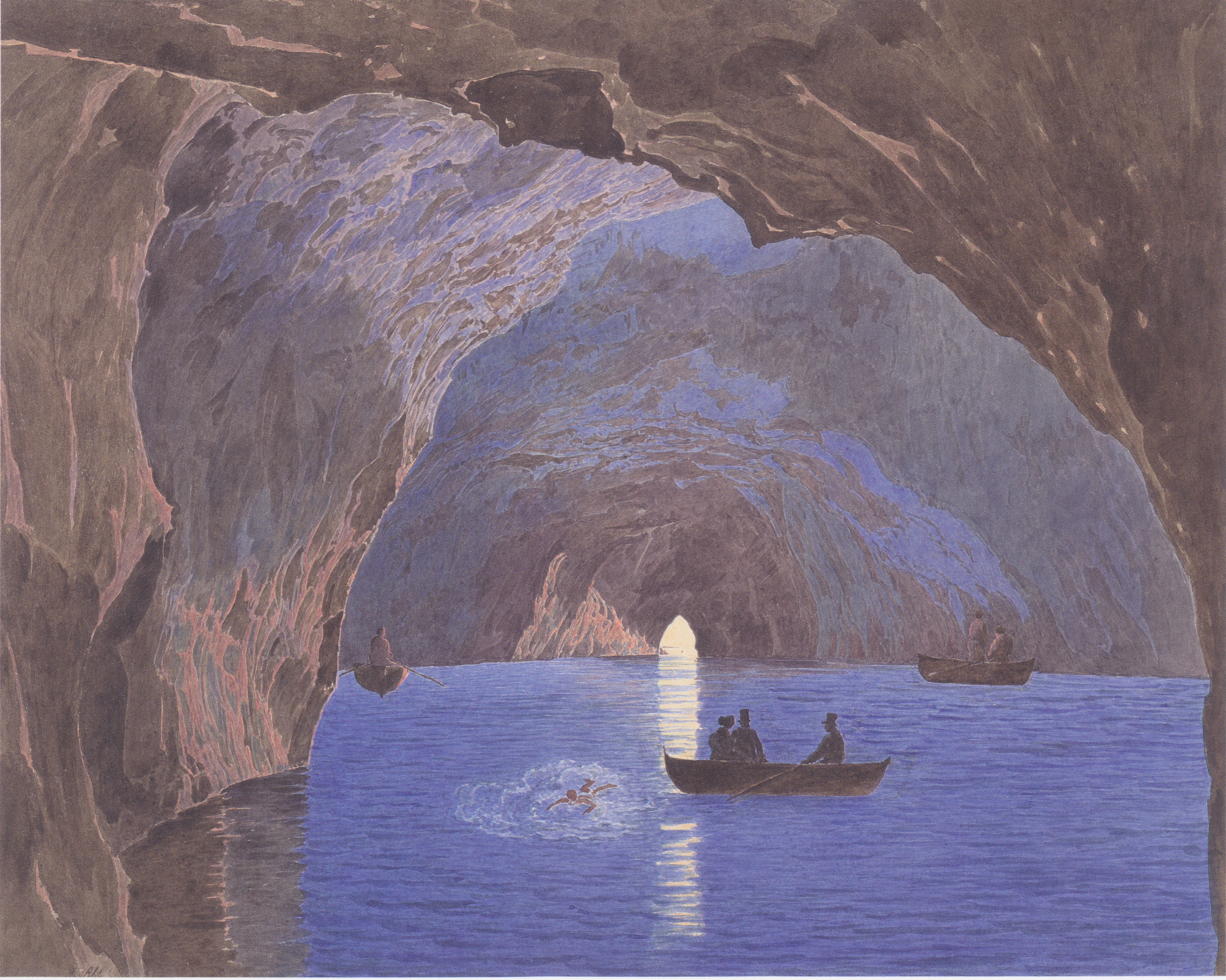
Painting by Jakob Alt, 1835–36

The Blue Grotto (Italian: Grotta Azzurra) is a sea cave on the coast of the island of Capri, southern Italy. Sunlight shining through an underwater cavity is reflected back upward through the seawater below the cavern, giving the water a blue glow that illuminates the cavern. The cave extends some 50 metres (160 ft) into the cliff at the surface, and is approximately 150 metres (490 ft) deep, with a sandy bottom.

== Access ==
The cave is 60 metres (200 ft) long and 25 metres (82 ft) wide. The entry is 2 metres (6 ft 7 in) wide and roughly 1 metre (3 ft 3 in) high at low tides, making safe access possible only when tides are low and the sea is calm. To enter the grotto, visitors must lie flat on the bottom of a small four-person rowboat. The oarsman then uses a metal chain attached to the cave walls to guide the boat inside the grotto.

In 2011, a visitor suffered a life-altering injury when his neck was broken while entering the cave. The Cooperativa Battellieri Grotta Azzurra initially denied liability, but settled a damages claim. It was concluded that the boatmen had continued entering the cave when the sea conditions were too dangerous. Swimming in the grotto is forbidden.

== Colour ==
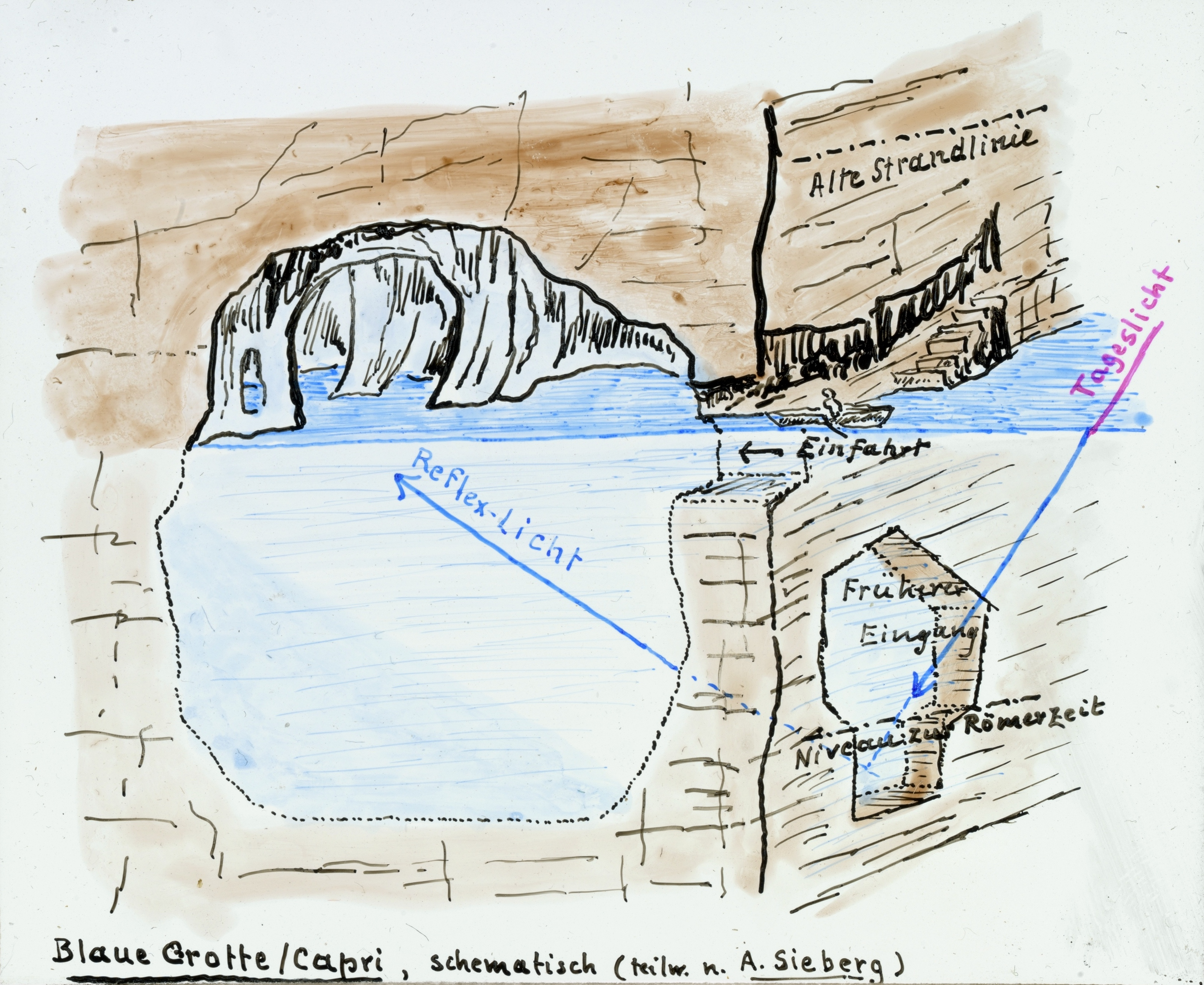
A diagram of how daylight illuminates the cave through the underwater opening.

The Blue Grotto is one of several sea caves worldwide that is flooded with a brilliant blue or emerald light. The quality and nature of the colour in each is determined by its unique combination of depth, breadth, water clarity, and light source.

In the case of the Blue Grotto, the light comes from two sources: the narrow arched entranceway, and a large hole somewhere below the above water entrance, separated by a band of rock between one and two meters tall. Since it is farther from the surface, much less light passes through the lower opening, but its depth and size allow it to be the grotto water's primary source of illumination.

As light passes through the water into the cave, red reflections are filtered out and only blue light enters the cave. Objects placed in the water of the grotto famously appear silver. This is caused by tiny bubbles, which cover the outside of the object when they are placed underwater. The bubbles cause the light to refract differently than it does from the surrounding water and gives off the silver effect.

In part because of the dazzling effect of the light from the above-water opening, it is impossible for a visitor who is in one of the rowboats to identify the shape of the larger hole, the outline of the bar that separates the two holes, or the nature of the light source. Visitors only have a general awareness of the light coming up from underneath as well as the water in the cave being more light-filled than the air. A visitor who places a hand in the water can see it "glow" eerily in this light.

The island of Capri gives its name to the colour Capri because of the colour's resemblance to the bright blue colour of the waters of the Blue Grotto.

== History ==
During Roman times, the grotto was used as the personal swimming hole of Emperor Tiberius as well as a marine temple. Tiberius moved from the Roman capital to the island of Capri in 27 AD. During Tiberius' reign, the grotto was decorated with several statues as well as resting areas around the edge of the cave. Three statues of the Roman sea gods Neptune and Triton were recovered from the floor of the grotto in 1964 and are now on display at a museum in Anacapri. Seven bases of statues were also recovered from the grotto floor in 2009. This suggests that there are at least four more statues lying on the cave's bottom. The cave was described by the Roman historian Pliny the Elder as being populated with Triton "playing on a shell". The now-missing arms on the recovered Triton statue—usually depicted with a conch shell—suggest that the statues recovered in 1964 are the same statues Pliny the Elder saw in the 1st century AD. According to a reconstruction of how the Blue Grotto might have looked in Roman times, a swarm of Triton statues headed by a Neptune statue may have stood in the walls of the cave. The Marevivo association aims to construct this by placing statues in the grotto. This project is being carried out in collaboration with the archaeological superintendence of Pompeii.

At the back of the main cave of the Blue Grotto, three connecting passageways lead to the Sala dei Nomi, or "Room of Names", named for the graffiti signatures left by visitors over the centuries. Two more passages lead deeper into the cliffs on the side of island. It was thought that these passages were ancient stairways which led to Emperor Tiberius' palace. However, the passages are natural ones that narrow and then end further along.

During the 18th century, the grotto was known to the locals as Gradola, after the nearby landing place of Gradola. It was avoided by sailors and islanders because it was said to be inhabited by witches and monsters. The grotto was then "rediscovered" by the public in 1826, with the visit of German writer August Kopisch and his friend Ernst Fries, who were taken to the grotto by local fisherman Angelo Ferraro.

== The legend of the Blue Grotto ==
The cave as in every medieval history was said to be a refuge for devils and monsters. Two priests determined to drive them away entered the cave swimming, and after a few minutes spent inside it, they ran away in panic as if they had seen the face of the devil. From that moment on, the two began to rant. Named the cursed cave, it has numerous legends.

== Cultural influence ==
In 1826, German writer August Kopisch and his friend Ernst Fries, a German painter, visited the cave and recorded their visit in the Kopisch's Entdeckung der blauen Grotte auf der Insel Capri in 1838.

A Neapolitan song dating from the 18th century, "la grotta azzurra" refers to this cave and also proves that it was already well known before its rediscovery in 1826.

In 1842, Danish choreographer August Bournonville set the second act of his ballet Napoli in the Blue Grotto. In this fantastic tale, Golfo, the demon who rules the Blue Grotto, transforms the ballet's heroine, Teresina, into a Naiad.

Mark Twain visited the Blue Grotto in 1867 and recorded his thoughts in his book The Innocents Abroad.

King Ludwig II of Bavaria had a "Venus Grotto" installed from 1875 to 1877 in the park of his Linderhof Palace. On the one hand, this should be an illustration of the First Act of Richard Wagner's opera Tannhäuser in the cave of Venusberg. On the other hand, the backdrop inside an artificial mountain cave should be able to be transformed into the Blue Grotto of Capri, an effect which was achieved using arc lamps and a power plant consisting of electric generators as well as specially developed blue lamp glass.

Uranian poet Edwin Emmanuel Bradford recorded his impression of a bathing boy in the Blue Grotto in the poem "In Quest of Love", included in In Quest of Love and Other Poems (1914), and again in "The Bather in the Blue Grotto at Capri", included in The New Chivalry and Other Poems (1918) and reprinted in To Boys Unknown (1988). Both poems were anthologised in Lad's Love: An anthology of Uranian poetry and prose (2010).

The grotto is highlighted in the 1953 Newbery Honor book Red Sails to Capri by Ann Weil.

In Alberto Moravia's 1954 novel Il disprezzo (Contempt), a vision appears to the protagonist when, under heavy mental stress, he visits the cave alone.

The cave is also featured as the album cover for Layo & Bushwacka!s album Night Works.
