= Entdeckung der blauen Grotte auf der Insel Capri =

1838 book by August Kopisch

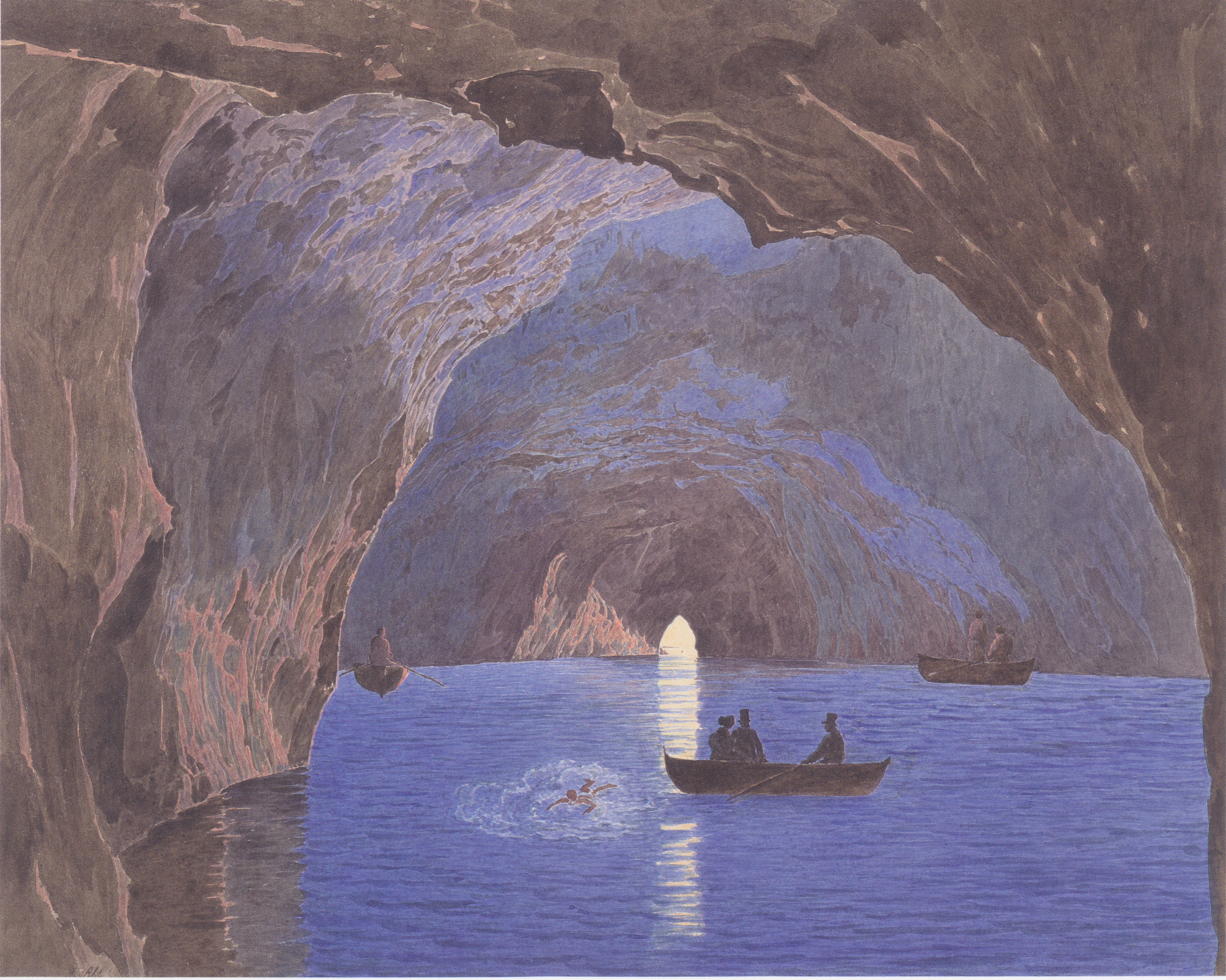
- Painting by Jakob Alt of the grotto after Kopisch's discovery
- Author: August Kopisch
- Language: German
- Subject: Blue Grotto on Capri
- Publication date: 1838
- ISBN: 3-8031-1163-3
- LC Class: DG975.C2 K63

Entdeckung der blauen Grotte auf der Insel Capri (Discovery of the Blue Grotto on the Isle of Capri) is an 1838 book by German writer and painter August Kopisch in which he describes his 1826 rediscovery of the Blue Grotto in Capri together with his friend Ernest Fries. The book sparked interest in the island among the Romantics, particularly in Germany, and introduced the world to the Blue Grotto, both as a tourist sight and as an iconic symbol for the island.

== Description ==
In the book Kopisch describes how he met and became friends with local notary Don Giuseppe Pagano, who told him about the existence of a grotto that the locals presumably knew about but did not enter because of superstition. Swimming inside, he not only noticed the deeply saturated blue color of the water, but also found remains that suggested the grotto had been used by Romans in the past.

After he had returned from the grotto, Kopisch made the first two sketches of it that started a wave of artistic and later photographic depictions of the Blue Grotto. On his second and third visits, Kopisch also made measurements of the grotto.

== Bibliographic information ==
- August Kopisch; Dieter Richter (ed.) (1997). Entdeckung der blauen Grotte auf der Insel Capri. Berlin: Wagenbach Verlag. ISBN 3-8031-1163-3.
