= Gardens of Augustus =

Botanical garden in Campania, Italy

Coordinates: 40°32′51″N 14°14′36″E

- Interactive map of Gardens of Augustus
- Type: Botanical garden
- Location: Capri, Campania, Italy

The Gardens of Augustus (Italian: Giardini di Augusto), originally known by the name of Krupp Gardens, are botanical gardens on the island of Capri, Campania, Italy.

The gardens were established by the German industrialist Friedrich Alfred Krupp in the early twentieth century to build his mansion in Capri. Initially the gardens took on the name of "Krupp Gardens", a title held until 1918, when the gardens were renamed "Gardens of Augustus", the title they are known as today.

The gardens, designed in terraces overlooking the sea, can be considered a testament to the rich flora of the island of Capri, with various ornamental plants and flowers such as geraniums, dahlias and brooms.

In the gardens there is a monument to Vladimir Lenin, one of the few of its kind in Italy, created in 1968, after the approval of a municipal resolution, by the Italian sculptor Giacomo Manzu to which the Soviet Embassy in Italy commissioned the work. The monument, consisting of several 5 meter high blocks of marble, is located in the gardens in front of the house of the Russian writer Maxim Gorky, who hosted Lenin there in 1908.

From the Gardens of Augustus one can get a 180-degree panoramic of the island of Capri because one can see Mount Solaro, the bay of Marina Piccola, and the Faraglioni.

== Gallery ==
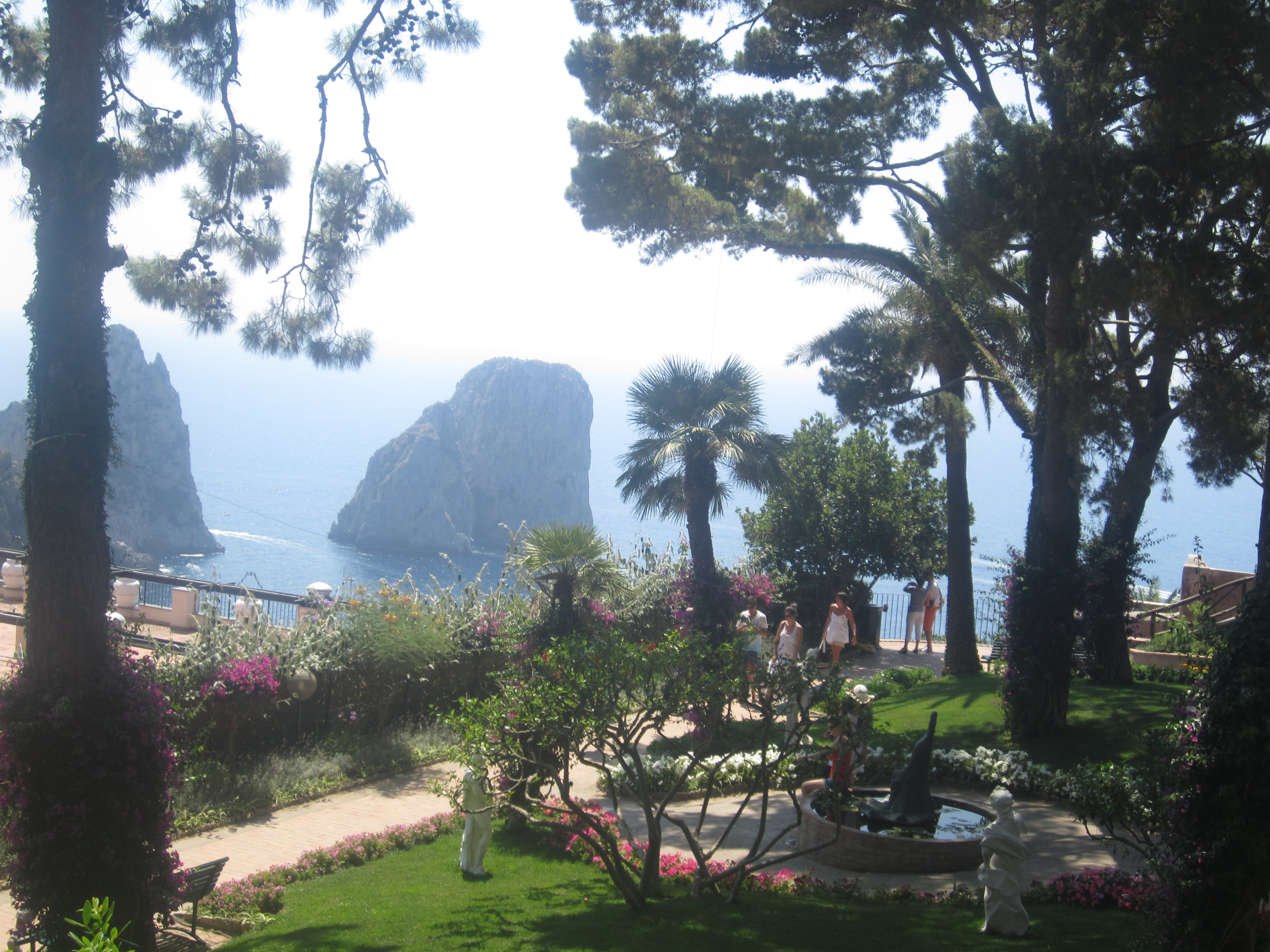
View towards the sea and the Faraglioni

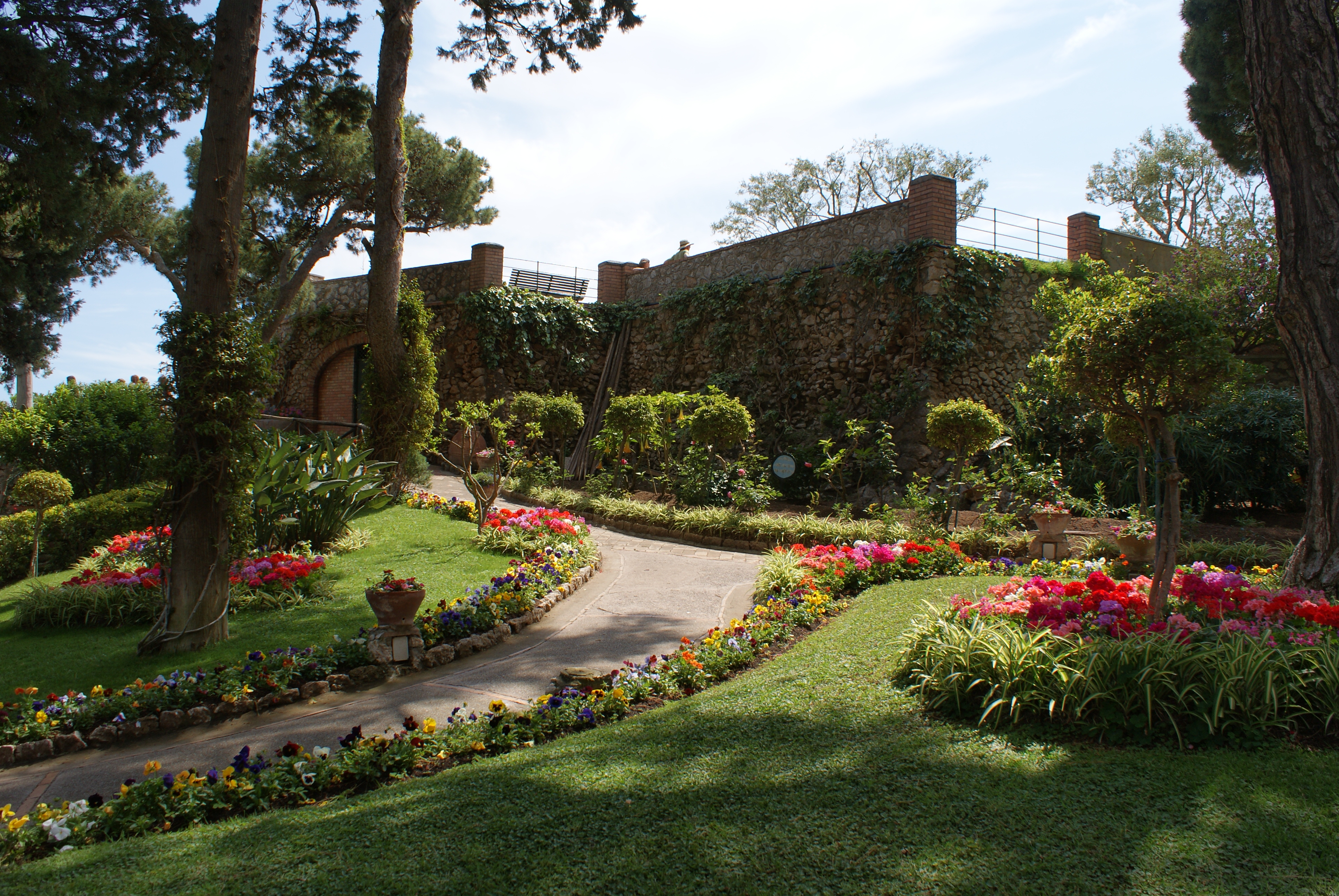
Uphill view

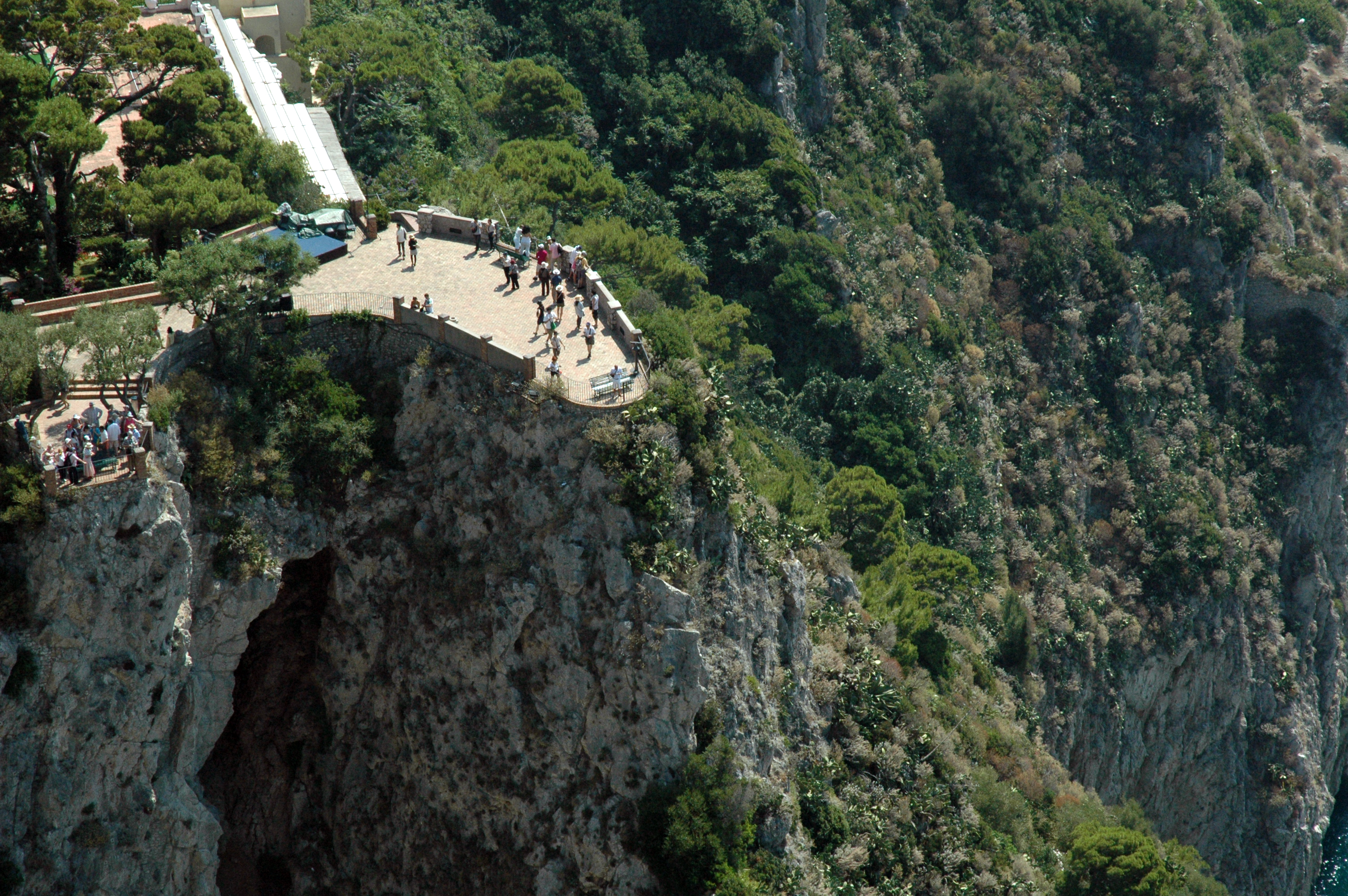
View of the overlook from Punta Cannone
