= Marina Grande, Capri =

Main port of Capri, Italy

Coordinates: 40°33′19″N 14°14′26″E

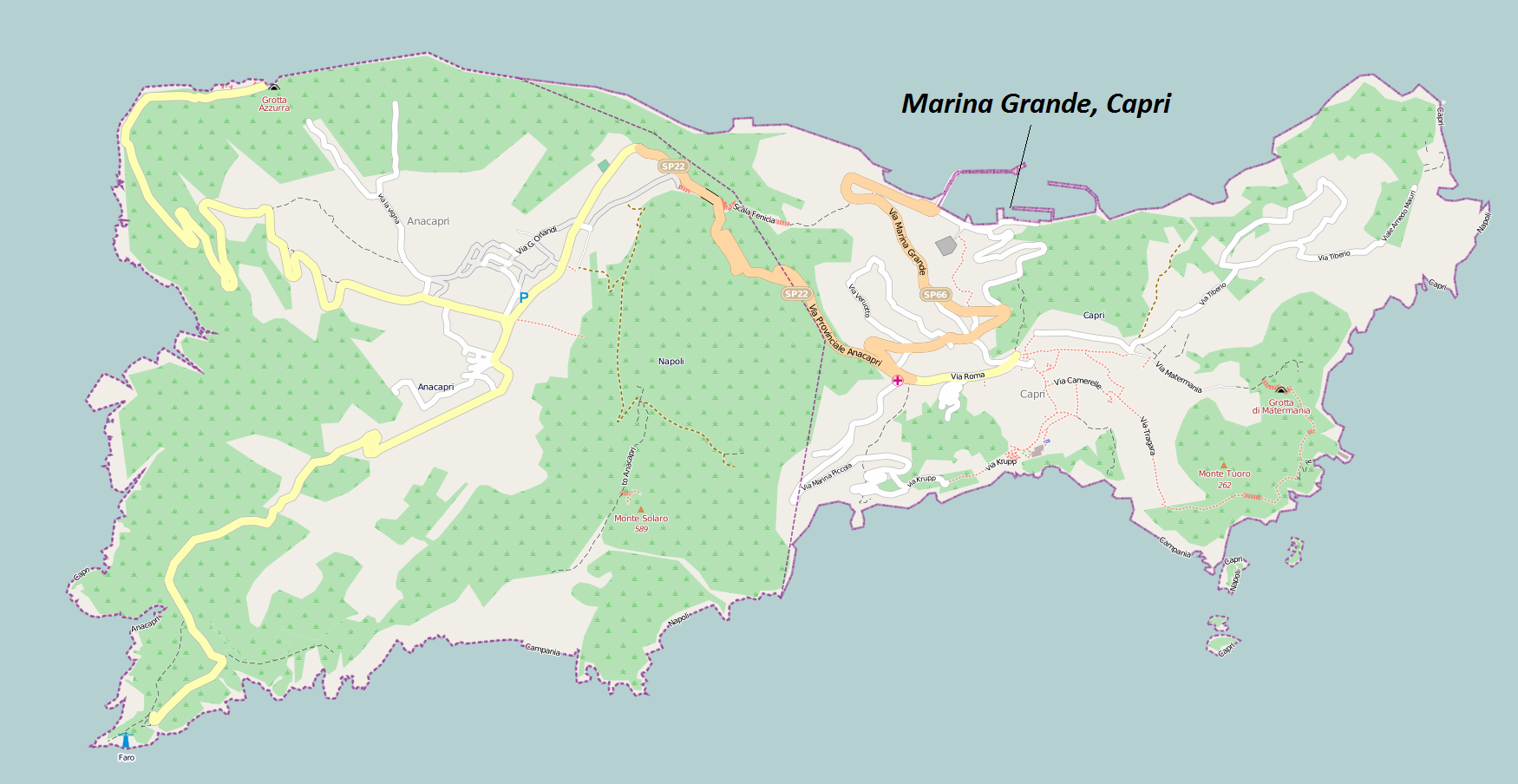
Map showing location

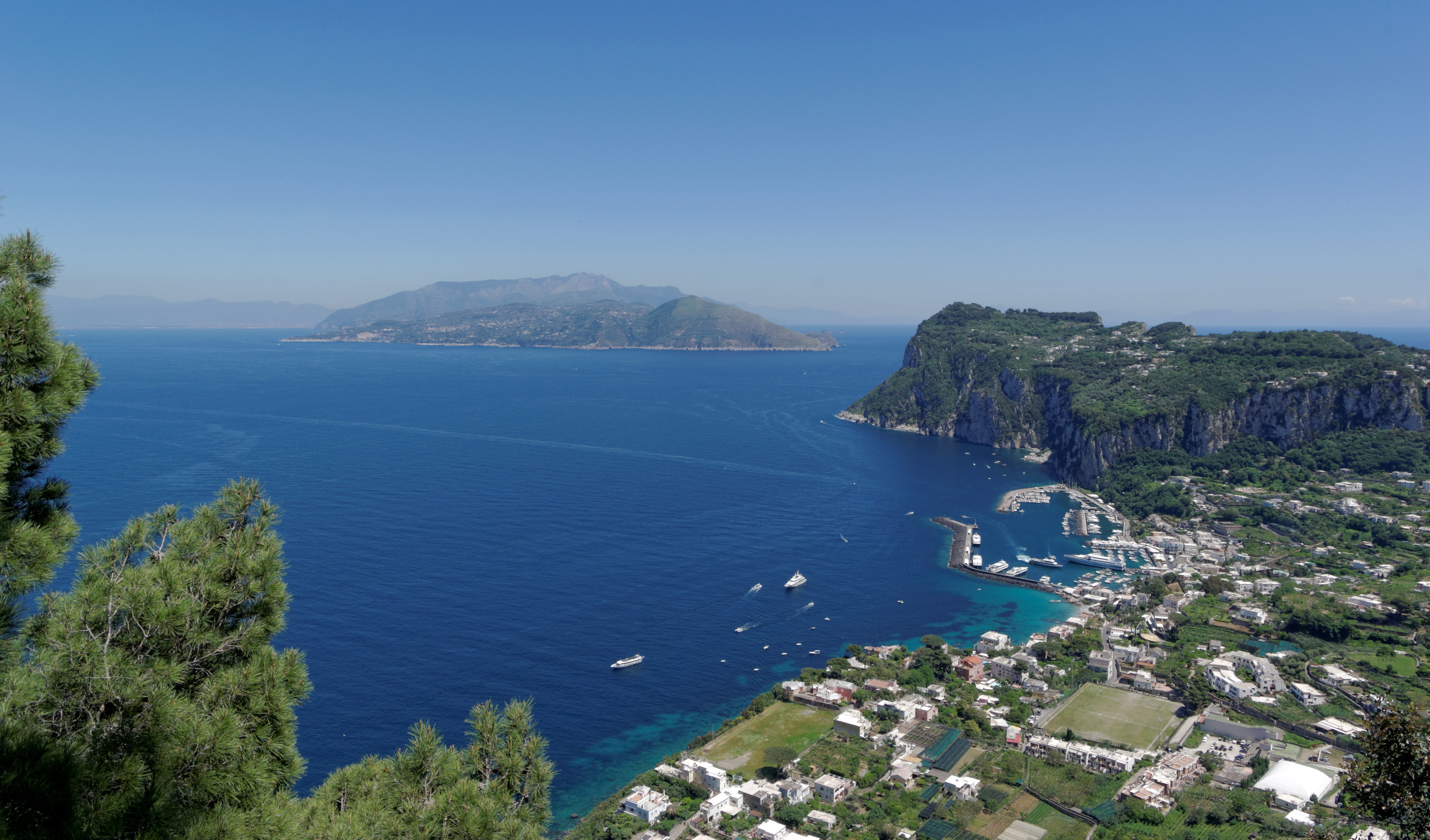
Marina Grande, Capri

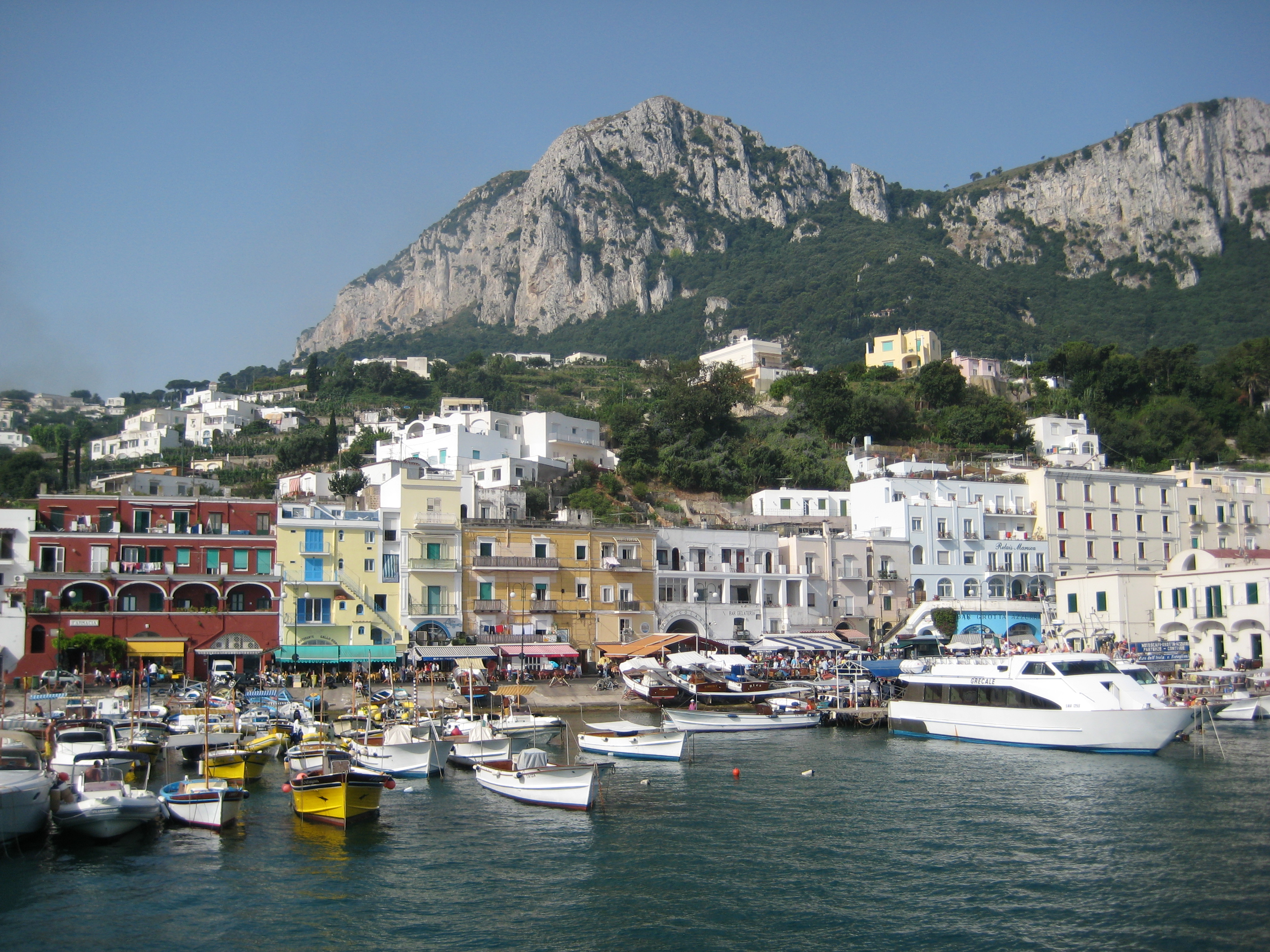
Marina Grande

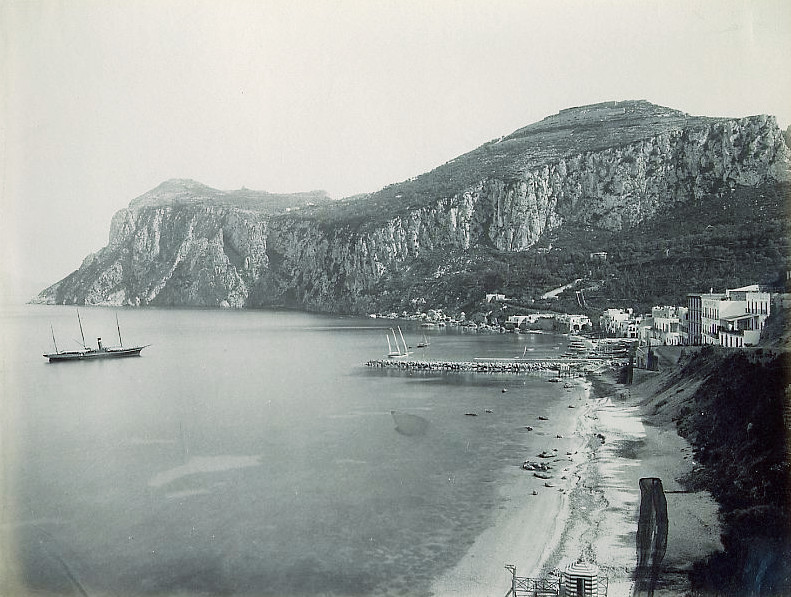
Marina Grande, ca. 1880 (photograph by Giorgio Sommer)

Marina Grande is the main port of the island of Capri in Italy, to the north of the main town of Capri and at the foot of Mount Solaro.

== History ==
The Marina Piccola, on the island's southern shore, preceded the Marina Grande; it was used by Augustus and Tiberius. The Romans used the Marina Grande, an ancient fishing port, as a port during Augustian times, and built the Palazzo a Mare nearby. Tiberius fortified and reinforced Marina Grande. Capri was also the first point in Campania in which the Greeks landed; women on Capri have been said to "still sometimes show distinctly Grecian features". In the seventh century, Bishop Costanzo died near Marina Grande and became the island's patron saint; the Chiesa di San Costanzo is situated between Marina Grande and Anacapri.

== Geography ==
Marina Grande is located on the northern side of the island. Travel between the Marina Piccola and the Marina Grande occurs by circling around the Faraglioni stacks. Before 1928, docking took place directly in the bay, but it has since been developed into a port and seaside resort with a notable beach, which is the largest on the island. A small square overlooks the port surrounded by "the characteristic houses of Capri, rendered typical by the terraces, the balconies, the open galleries and the multi-coloured facades of the town, brightened by the "Pompeian red", which is one of the most intense notes of colour along the whole Neapolitan coast." The town is also characterized by steep terraced slopes with Mediterranean flora. A Corinthian capital lies on a high pedestal at the end of the western wharf, testament to the Roman presence in the area.

== Transport ==
Boats operate between Marina Grande and Naples on the mainland, and also on excursions to visit the Blue Grotto. Funicolar, the cableway which is run by SIPPIC, connects the harbour to the city centre's Piazzetta; as does bus with Anacapri.

== Tourism ==
Notable hotels include Villa Marina Capri, Hotel Excelsior Parco Capri, Relais Maresca, and Hotel Bristol. Ristorante Pizzeria Lo Zodiaco lies on the harbour front. An annual festival in honour of the Madonna della Libera is held on the Marina Grande in the middle of September.
