= Torre Materita =

Tower in Anacapri, Italy

Coordinates: 40°32′45.67″N 14°12′28.85″E

Torre Materita is an ancient medieval tower converted into a villa located in the comune of Anacapri, Capri.

Built in 1378 by monks of the Certosa di San Giacomo to defend the population from the incursions of the Saracens, the villa is located on the road from the town of Anacapri, leads to the lighthouse at Punta Carena. From 1908 to 1943 it was the residence of the Swedish doctor and writer Axel Munthe. Here the senior doctor wrote his famous book: The Story of San Michele.
