= Santa Maria a Cetrella =

Coordinates: 40.5473°N 14.2291°E

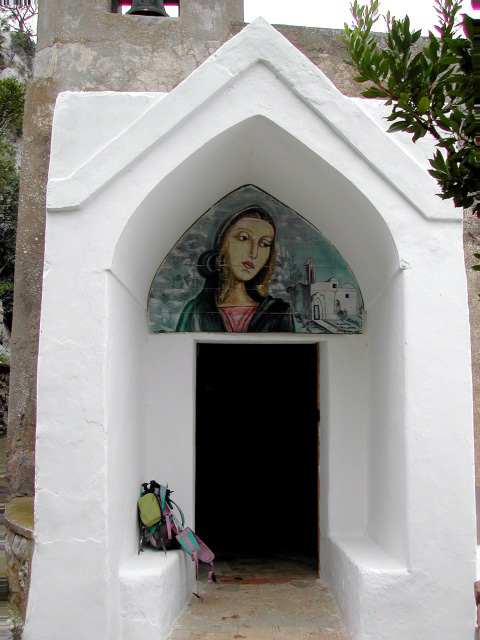
Eremo cetrella

Santa Maria a Cetrella is a Franciscan chapel and hermitage in Anacapri, Capri, Italy. Referred to as "Capri's most otherworldly church", it contains a Madonna statue which is venerated by pilgrims, including Rainer Maria Rilke. Built in the Middle Ages, its features include stucco siding, with a low-vaulted ceiling.

It is located on Mount Solaro's Cetrella region. In the Middle Ages, Capriote residents prayed to Santa Maria a Cetrella to intercede on behalf of the island's fishermen.
