= Marina Piccola =

Coordinates: 40°32′42″N 14°14′6″E

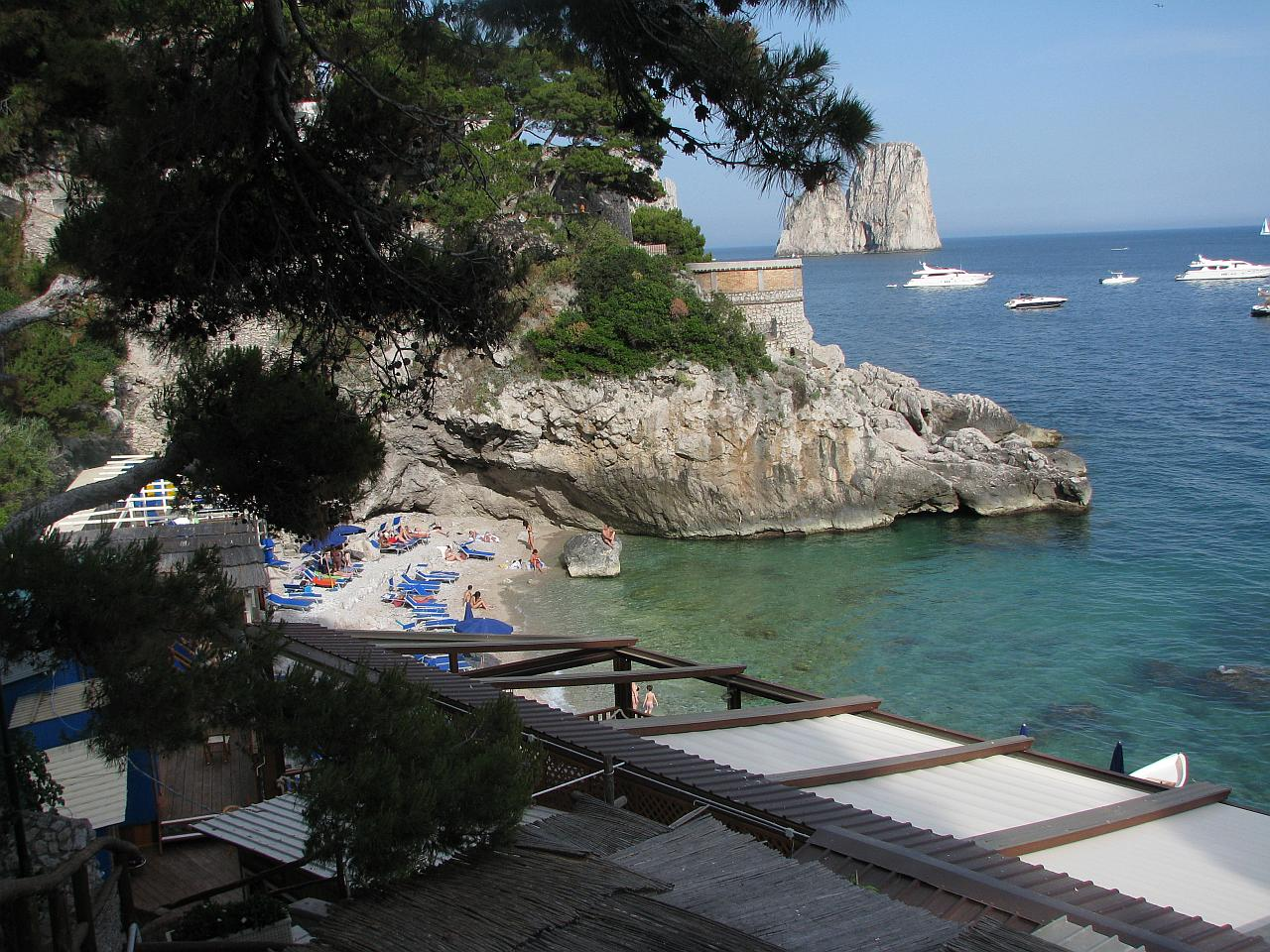
Marina Piccola

Marina Piccola ("little harbor"; also Marina di Mulo) is located on the southern side of the island of Capri. It is near the Faraglioni sea stacks to the southeast. The Via Krupp is a historic switchback paved footpath that connects the Charterhouse of San Giacomo and the Gardens of Augustus area with Marina Piccola.

The Marina Piccola, used by Augustus and Tiberius, preceded the Marina Grande.

== See also ==
- Tyrrhenian Sea
