= Capri Philosophical Park =

Park in Anacapri, Italy

Coordinates: 40°32′25.2″N 14°12′35.78″E

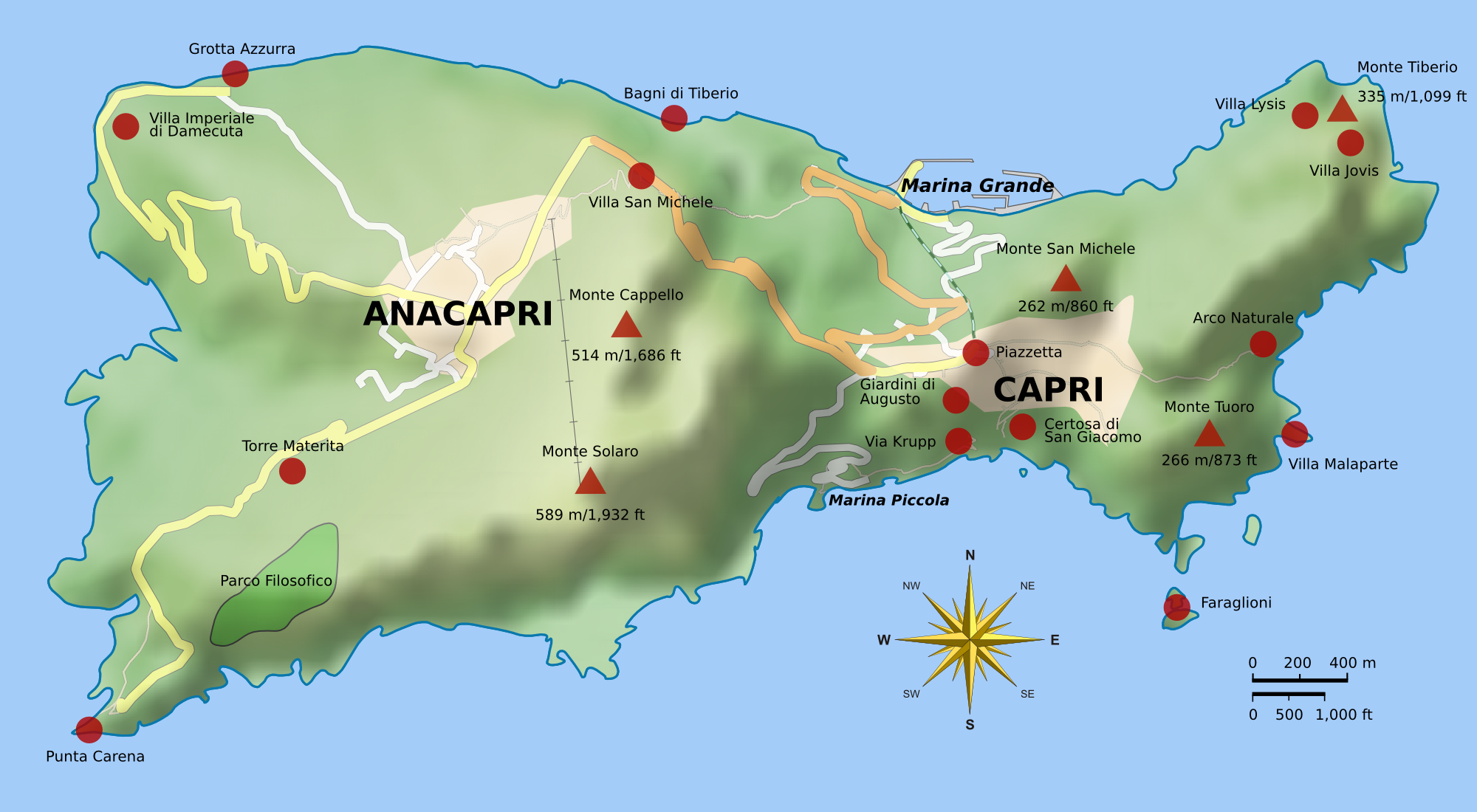
Location of Capri Philosophical Park in the southwest of Capri

Capri Philosophical Park (Italian: Parco Filosofico) is situated on the outskirts of the small town of Anacapri on the Italian island of Capri.

The park was founded in 2000 by the Swedish professor and author Gunnar Adler-Karlsson together with his wife, Marianne Ehrnford.

In the park there are small tablets with quotes by 60 different Western philosophers.
