= Arco Naturale =

Rock gate on the island of Capri, Italy

Coordinates: 40°32′58″N 14°15′21″E

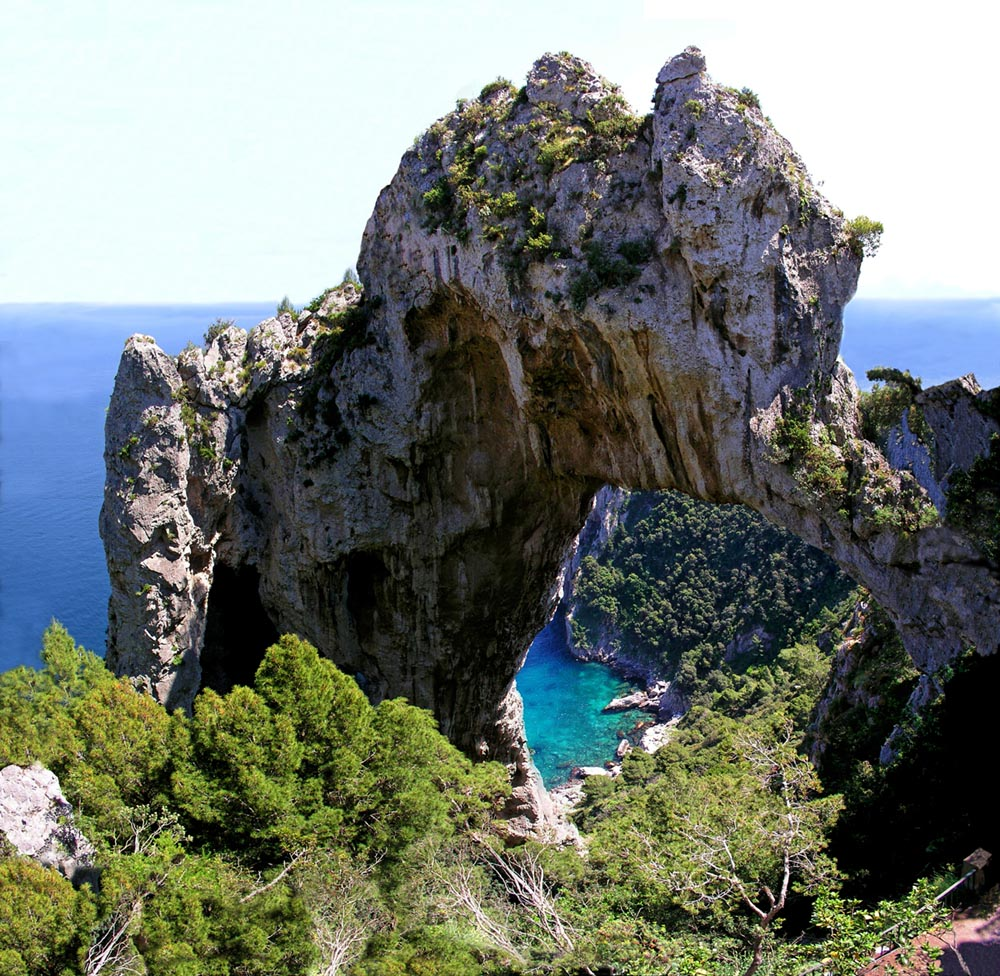
Arco Naturale

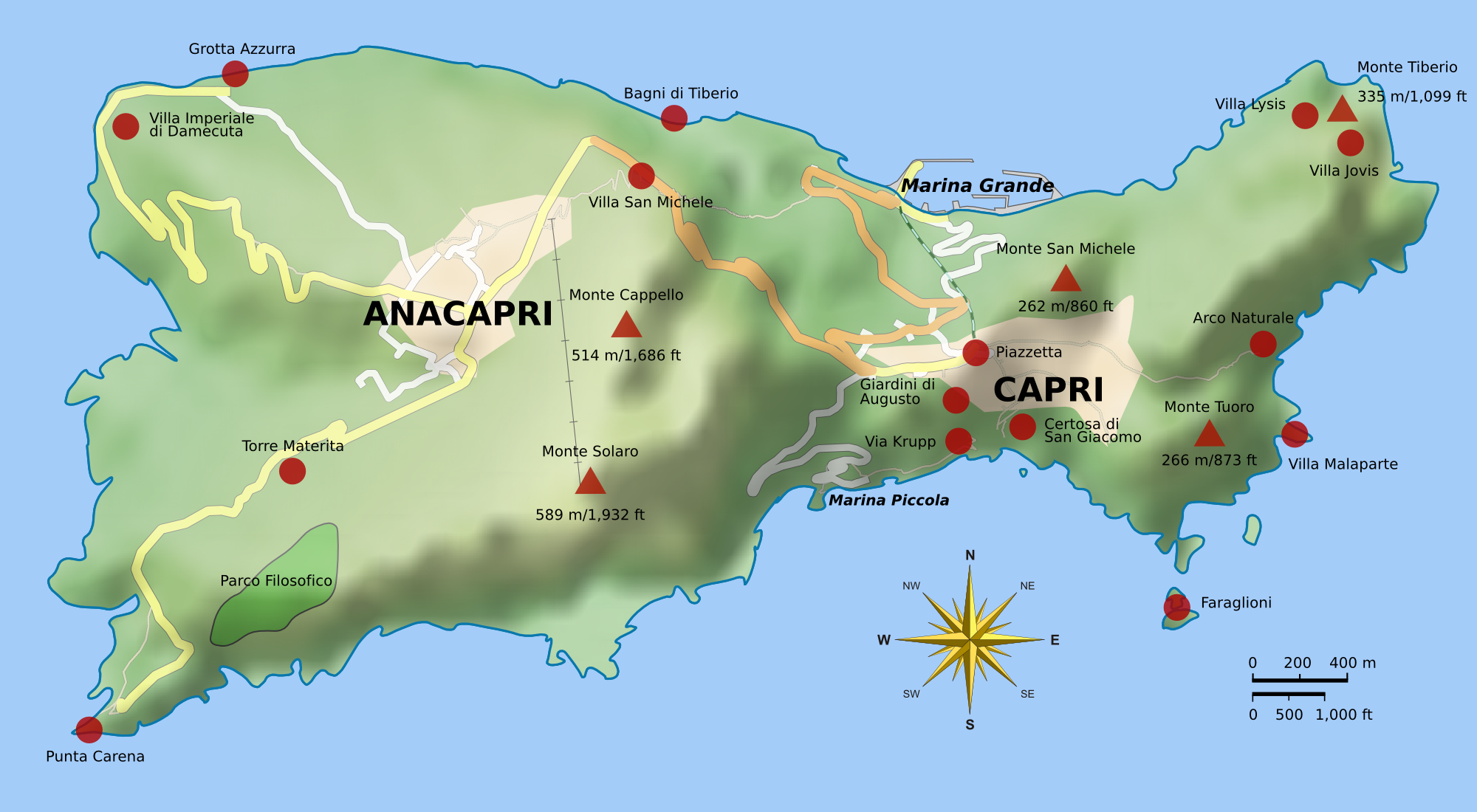
Location of Arco Naturale on the east coast of Capri

The Arco Naturale is a natural arch on the east coast of the island of Capri, Italy. Dating from the Paleolithic age, it is the remains of a collapsed grotto. The arch spans 12 m at a height of 18 m above ground and consists of limestone.

== Gallery ==
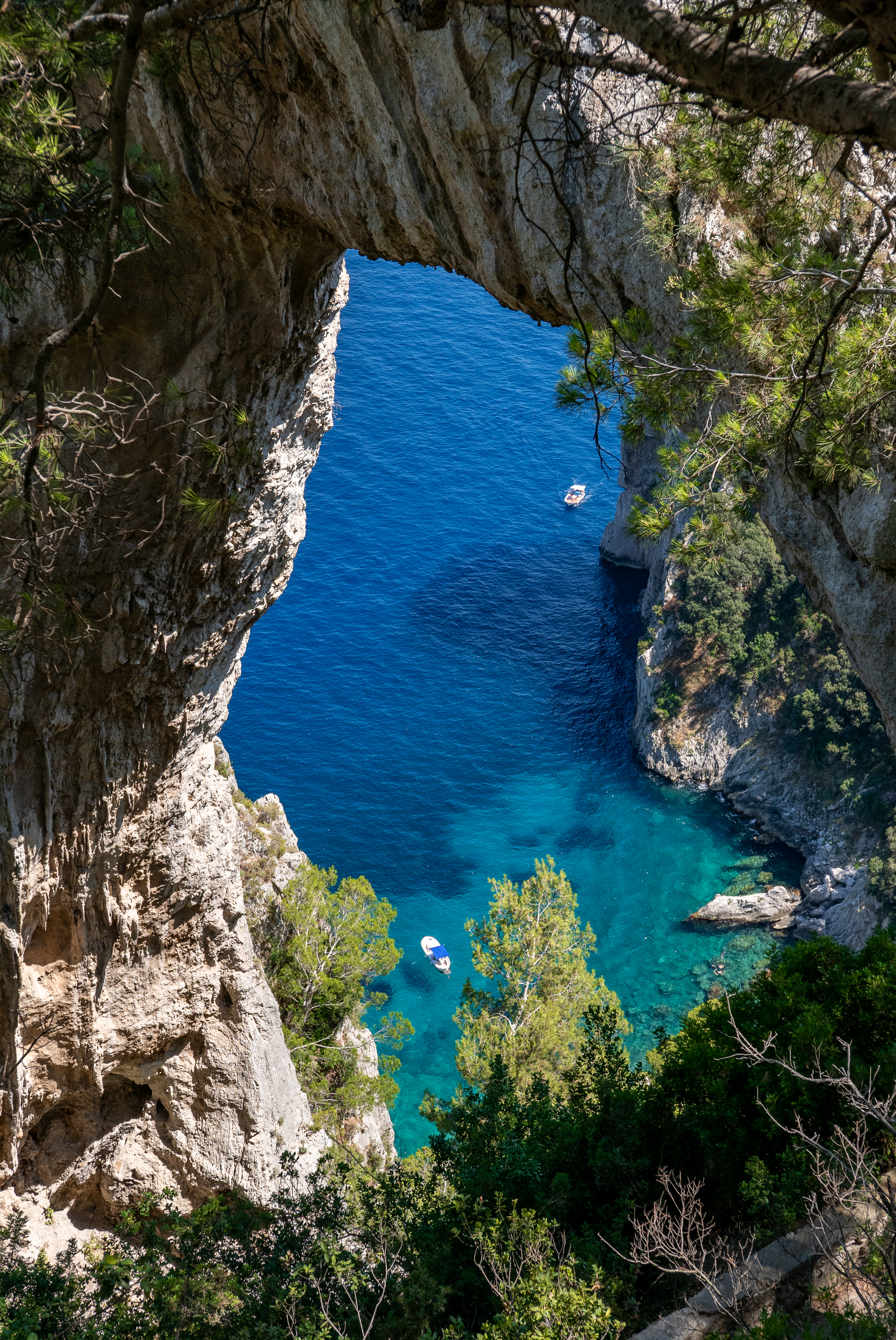

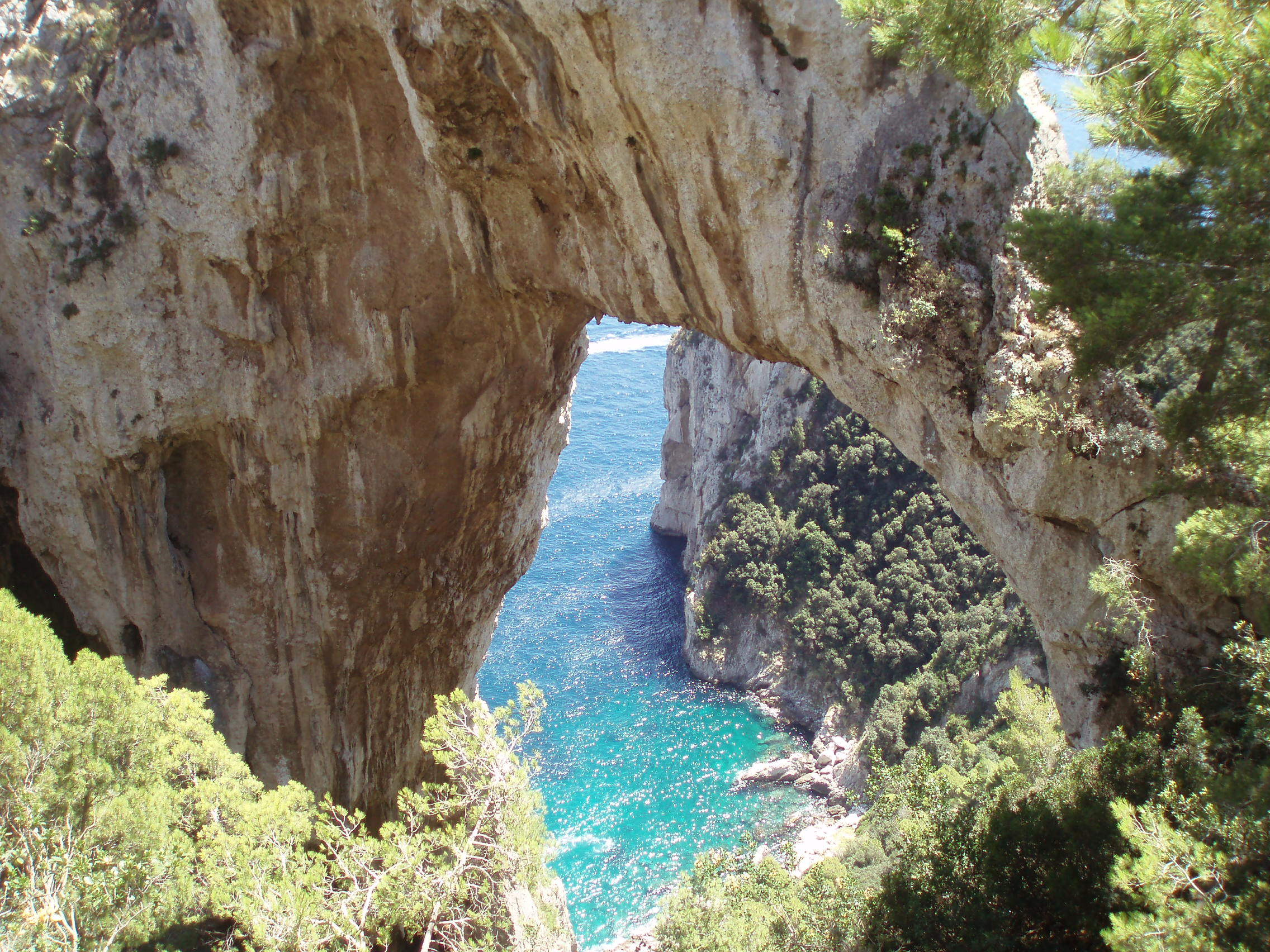

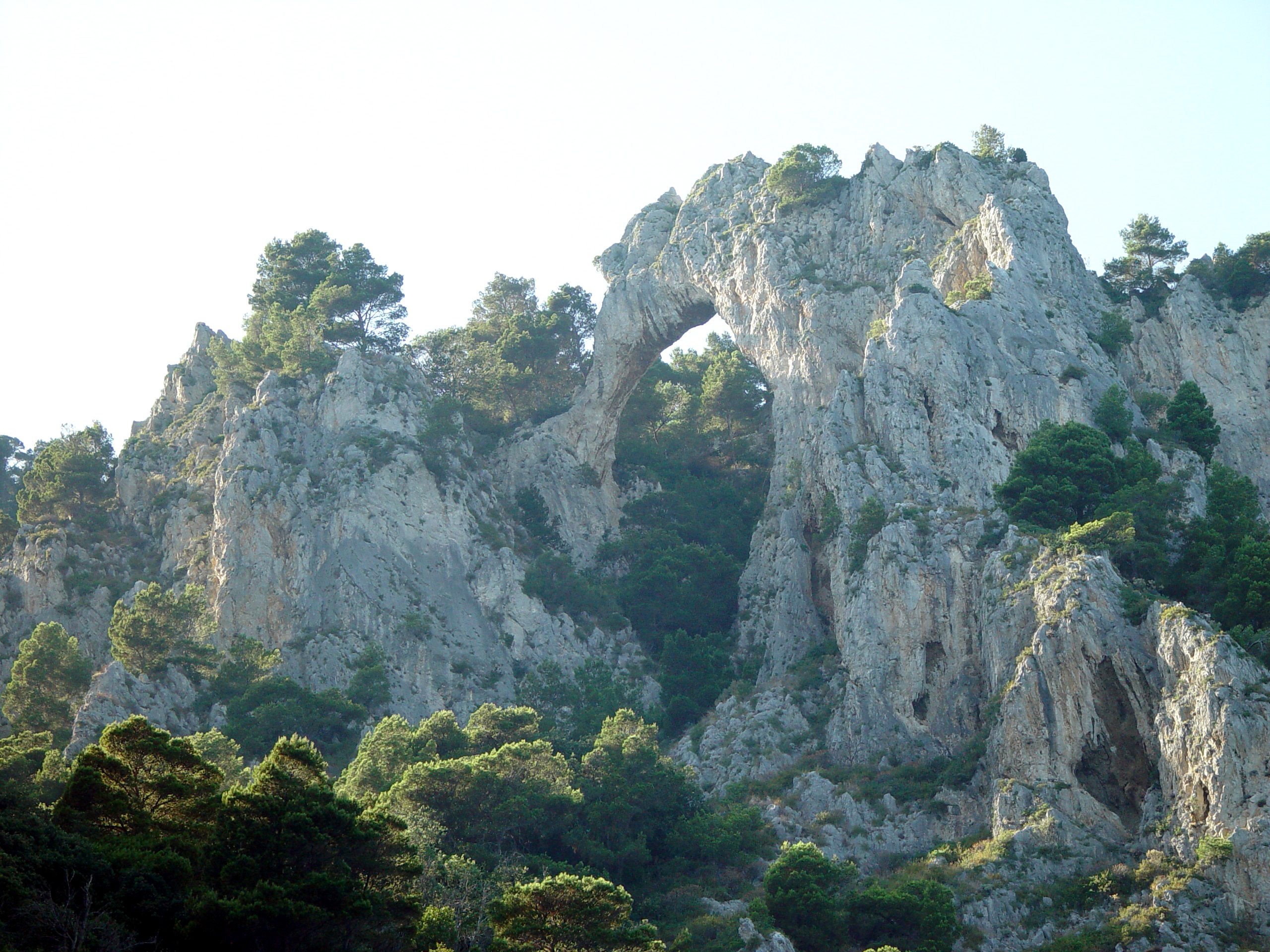
View from below

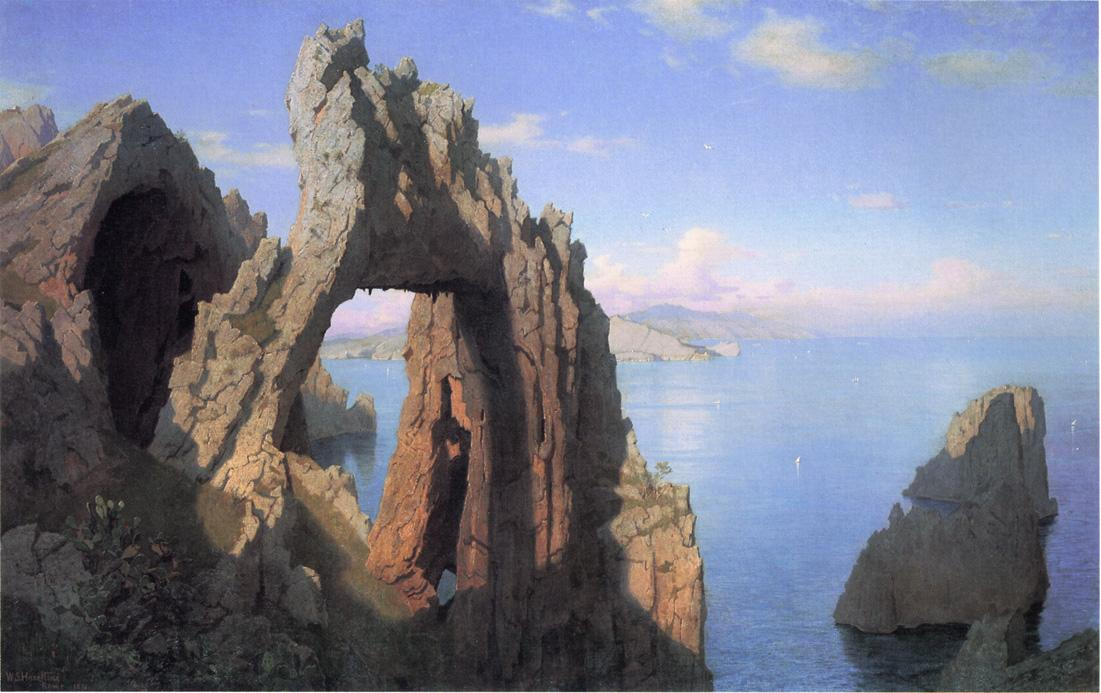
Painting by William Stanley Haseltine
