= Monte Solaro =

Mountain in Italy

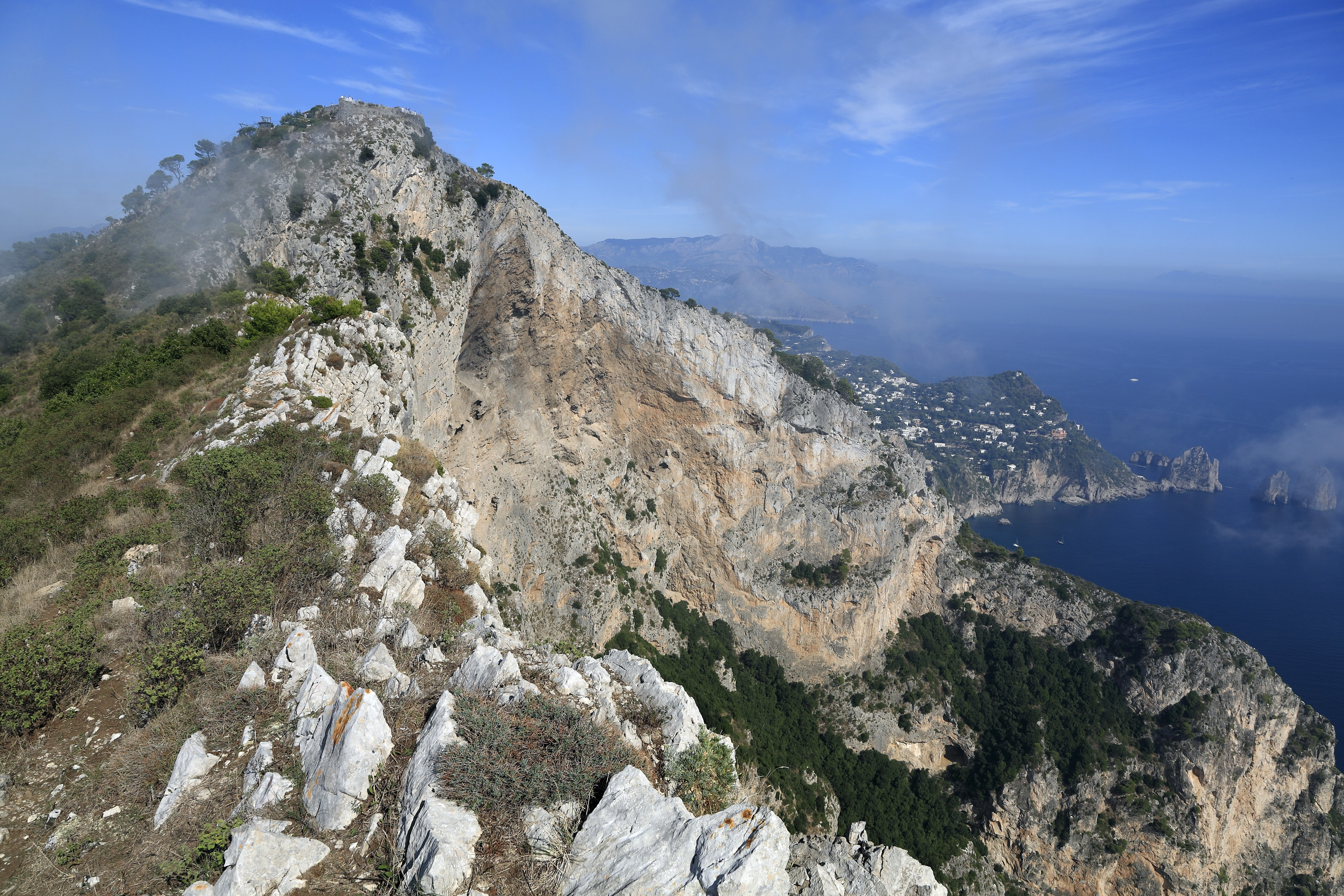
- Mount Solaro

Highest point
- Elevation: 589 m (1,932 ft)
- Prominence: 589 m (1,932 ft)
- Coordinates: 40°32′40″N 14°13′26″E

Geography
- Location within Italy
- Location: Campania, Italy

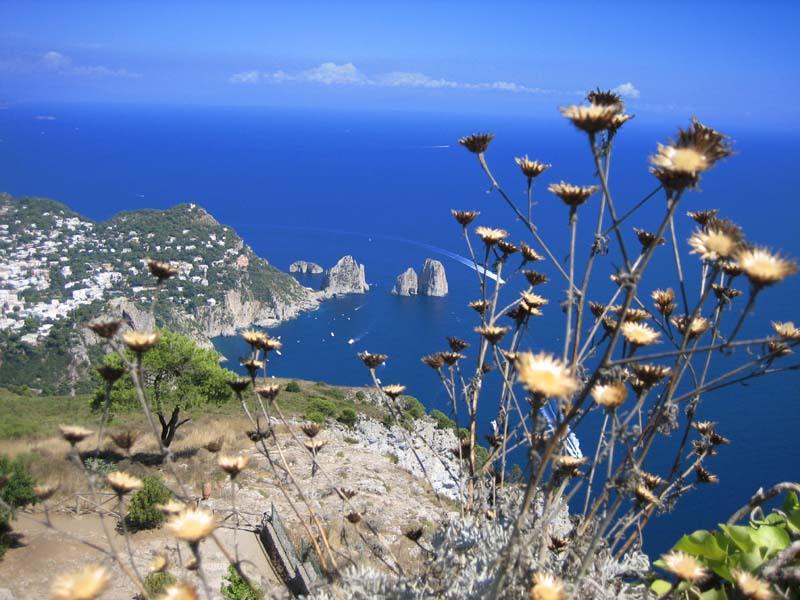
View from Monte Solaro towards the Faraglioni

Monte Solaro is a mountain on the island of Capri in Campania, Italy. With an elevation of 589 m, its peak is the highest point of Capri.

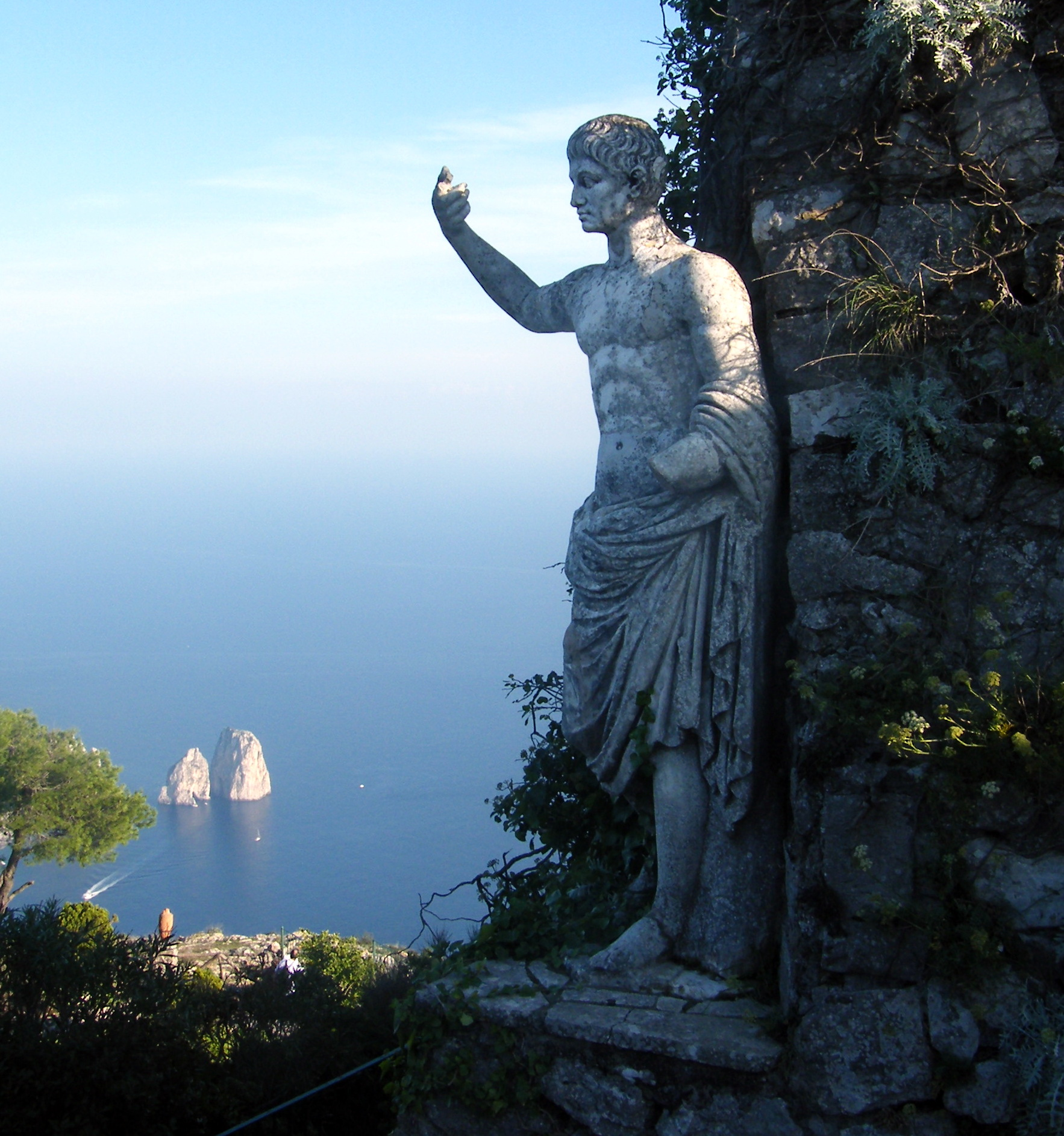
Statue of Emperor Augustus

It contains the "Fortino di Bruto", a blockhouse which was used in battles between Britain and France in the early 19th century. It is characterised by its "sheer dolomitic slopes" which form an "unsurpassable partition" between the eastern and western sides of the island. Marina Grande lies at the foot of the mountain. It became popular with painters due to its "romantic situation, affording extensive and beautiful views to the NW of the Tyrrhenian sea, the gulf of Naples". Up the mount there is a statue of Emperor Augustus who first landed on Capri.

== Geology and Topography ==
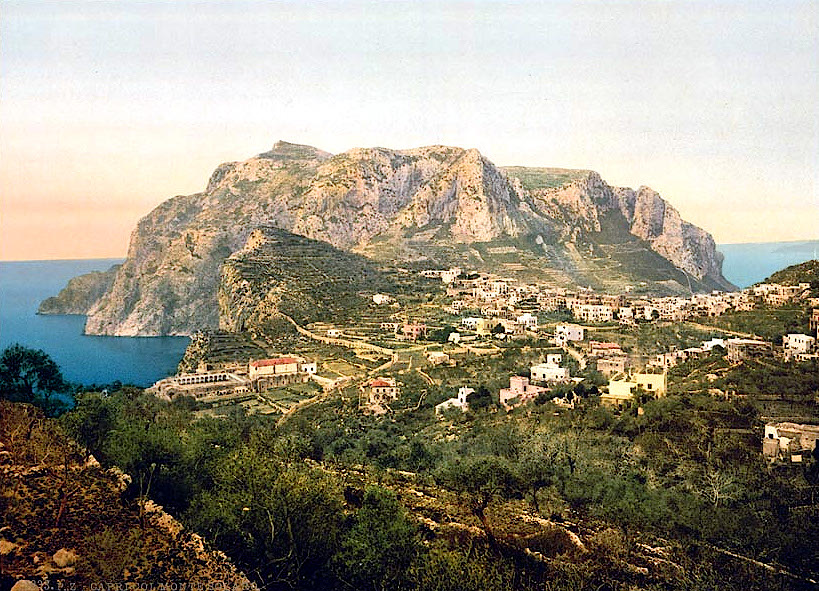
View of the mountain

Monte Solaro (Mount Solaro) is formed from the same limestone that the island is also composed of.

== Flora and fauna ==
=== Flora ===
The area around Monte Solaro is inhabited by over 900 species of vegetation. At higher altitudes, one might find acanthus, arbutus, heather, juniper, broom, ilex, lentisk, litosperma, myrtle and smilace. At lower altitudes, one might find laurels, rock-roses, strawberry trees, Daphne shrubs, Pistacia lentiscus (Mastic), myrtles, narcissus, orchids, and pines and the Lithodora Rosmarinifolia.

=== Fauna ===
The mountain is also visited by many species of birds, including peregrine falcons.

== Hiking ==
The summit is accessible by walking without too much difficulty by either the passetiello or a path that starts from Axel Munthe. Both routes are suitable for walkers in decent physical condition. Notable sites include the Eremo di Santa Maria a Cetrella for its architecture, and the remains of the Fortino di Bruto, a military fort built during the Napoleonic Wars.

From the top of Monte Visto, one can see both the gulfs of Napoli and Salerno.

== Climate ==
Monte Solaro has a typical Mediterranean climate, but with colder winters because of the high altitude.
