= Capri =

Island in the Tyrrhenian Sea, Italy

- View of Capri

- Location within Campania

Geography
- Location: Tyrrhenian Sea
- Coordinates: 40°33′00″N 14°14′00″E
- Area: 10.53 km^{2} (4.07 sq mi)
- Highest elevation: 589 m (1932 ft)
- Highest point: Monte Solaro

Administration
- Italy
- Region: Campania
- Metropolitan City: Naples
- Largest settlement: Anacapri (pop. 6,746)

Demographics
- Population: 13,451 (2026)
- Pop. density: 1,277.4/km^{2} (3308.5/sq mi)

Capri (Note: US: /ˈkɑːpri/ KAH-pree, also /kəˈpriː/ kə-PREE UK: /ˈkæpri/ KAP-ree Italian: [ˈkaːpri]) is an island located in the Tyrrhenian Sea off the Sorrento Peninsula, on the south side of the Gulf of Naples in the Campania region of Italy. A resort destination since the time of the Roman Republic, it is known for its natural beauty, historic sites, and tourism industry. It has 13,451 inhabitants.

The island is characterized by its rugged limestone landscape, sea stacks (faraglioni), coastal grottoes including the renowned Blue Grotto, and high cliffs overlooking the sea. Notable features include the harbours of Marina Grande and Marina Piccola, the panoramic Belvedere of Tragara, the ruins of Roman imperial villas such as Villa Jovis, and the towns of Capri and Anacapri, the latter situated higher up the slopes of Monte Solaro, the island's highest point.

Administratively, Capri is part of the Metropolitan City of Naples within the Campania region. The island is divided into two municipalities: Capri and Anacapri.

== Etymology ==
The origin of the name Capri is uncertain. It may derive from the Ancient Greek κάπρος (kápros), meaning 'wild boar'. Ancient Greek colonists from Magna Graecia were the first recorded inhabitants, calling the island Kapreai (Καπρέαι). Alternatively, the name could come from the Latin capreae, meaning 'goats'. Fossils of wild boars have been found on the island, supporting the Greek etymology. A less likely theory suggests an Etruscan origin meaning 'rocky', referencing the island's limestone terrain.

== History ==
=== Antiquity ===
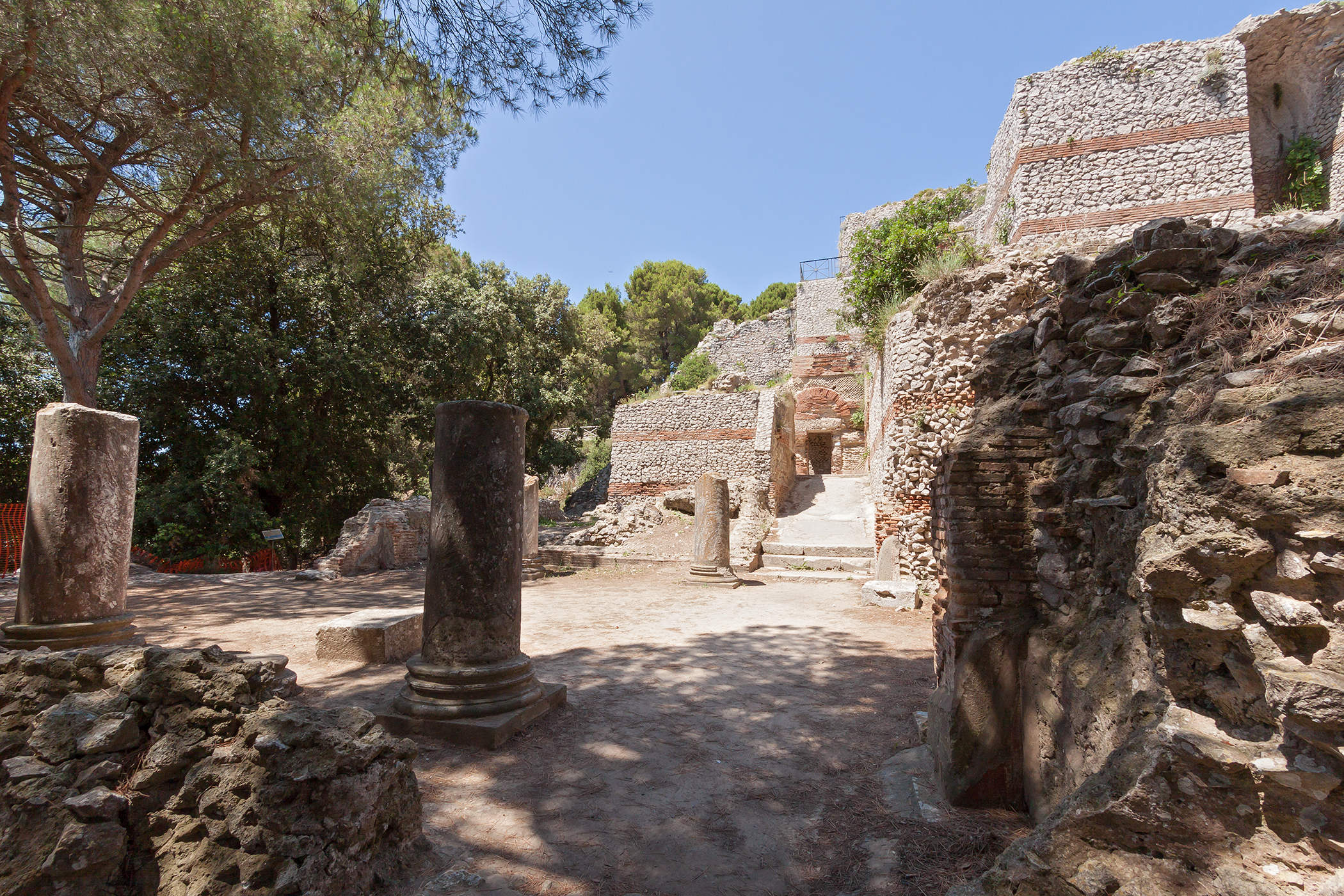
The ruins of Villa Jovis, completed by Emperor Tiberius in AD 27

Archaeological evidence indicates human presence on Capri dating back to the Neolithic and Bronze Age. The Roman historian Suetonius recounts that when workers excavated the foundations for Emperor Augustus's villa, they discovered giant bones and stone weapons, which Augustus displayed in his residence, the Palazzo a Mare. (Modern analysis suggests these may have been fossils of large extinct mammals.)

The Roman poet Virgil, in the Aeneid, referred to the island being inhabited by Greek settlers from the Ionian Islands (the Teleboi). The geographer Strabo noted that Capri anciently had two towns, later reduced to one.

Emperor Augustus developed Capri as a private resort, building villas, temples, and aqueducts, and planting gardens. His successor, Tiberius, constructed twelve villas on the island according to Tacitus. The most famous, Villa Jovis, is one of the best-preserved Roman villas in Italy. In AD 27, Tiberius moved permanently to Capri, governing the Roman Empire from the island until his death in AD 37. Later, in AD 182, Emperor Commodus exiled his sister Lucilla to Capri, where she was subsequently executed.

=== Middle ages and modern era ===
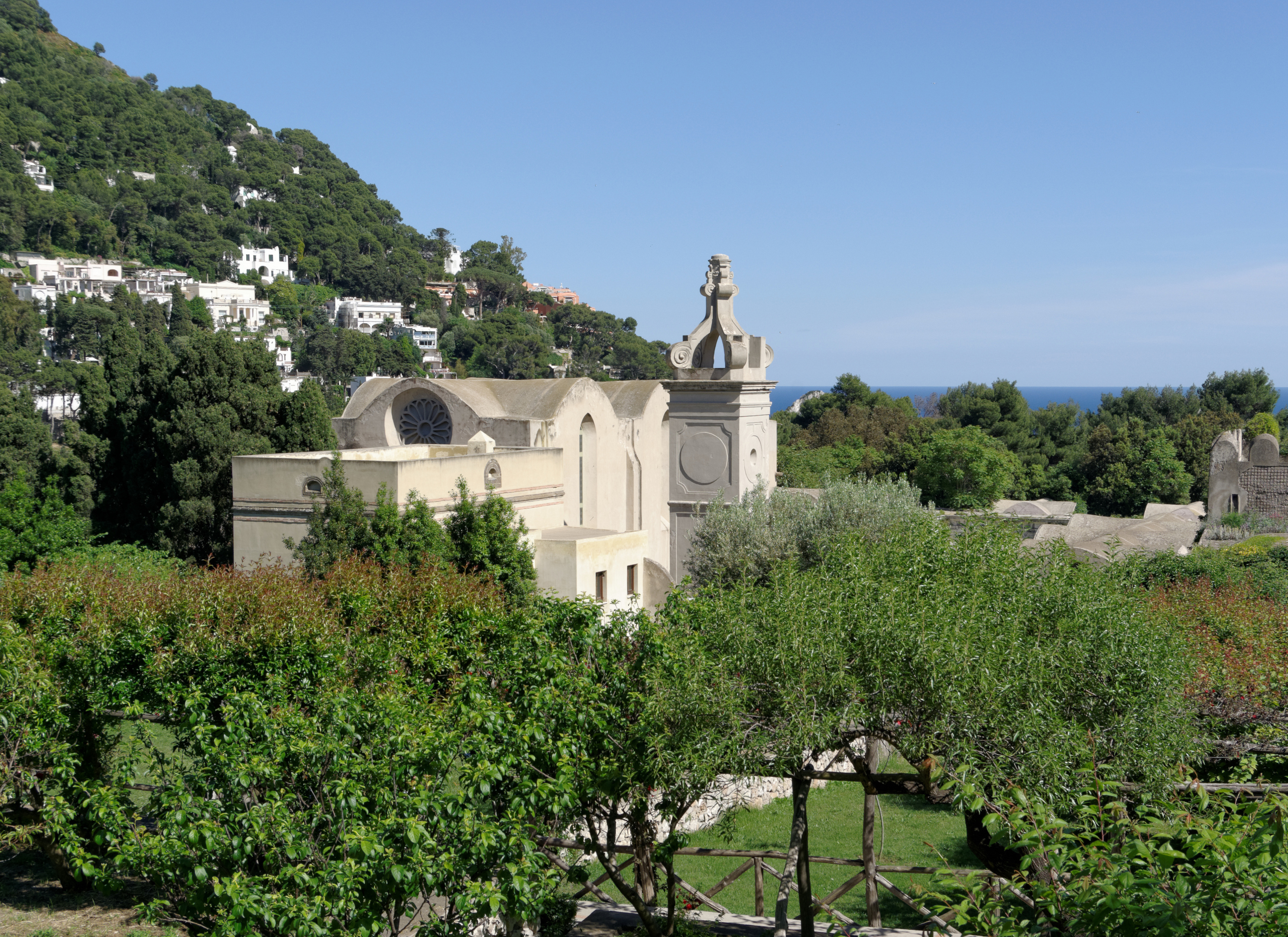
Certosa di San Giacomo, a Carthusian monastery founded in 1363

After the fall of the Western Roman Empire, Capri came under the control of the Duchy of Naples. The island suffered raids by pirates and Saracens. In 866, Emperor Louis II granted the island to the Duchy of Amalfi. In 987, Pope John XV established the Diocese of Capri, initially as a suffragan to the Archdiocese of Amalfi. Capri remained a diocese until 1818, when it was absorbed into the Archdiocese of Sorrento with the Papal bull De utiliori. It is now listed as a titular see.

By the end of the conflict for the kingdom of Naples between Louis II of Anjou and Ladislaus, the fort of Capri, controlled by Louis' garrison, was besieged by Ladislaus' forces and captured in July 1399. The French garrison escaped death by joining French marshal Boucicaut's passing ships on their way to fight the Turks in the Aegean Sea.

In 1496, King Frederick IV of Naples established administrative parity between the settlements of Capri and Anacapri. Pirate raids intensified during the 16th century; admirals Barbarossa Hayreddin Pasha and Turgut Reis captured the island for the Ottoman Empire in 1535 and 1553, respectively.

The French antiquarian Jean-Jacques Bouchard visited in the 17th century and is considered one of the first modern tourists; his diary provides valuable insights.

=== 19th Century to Present ===
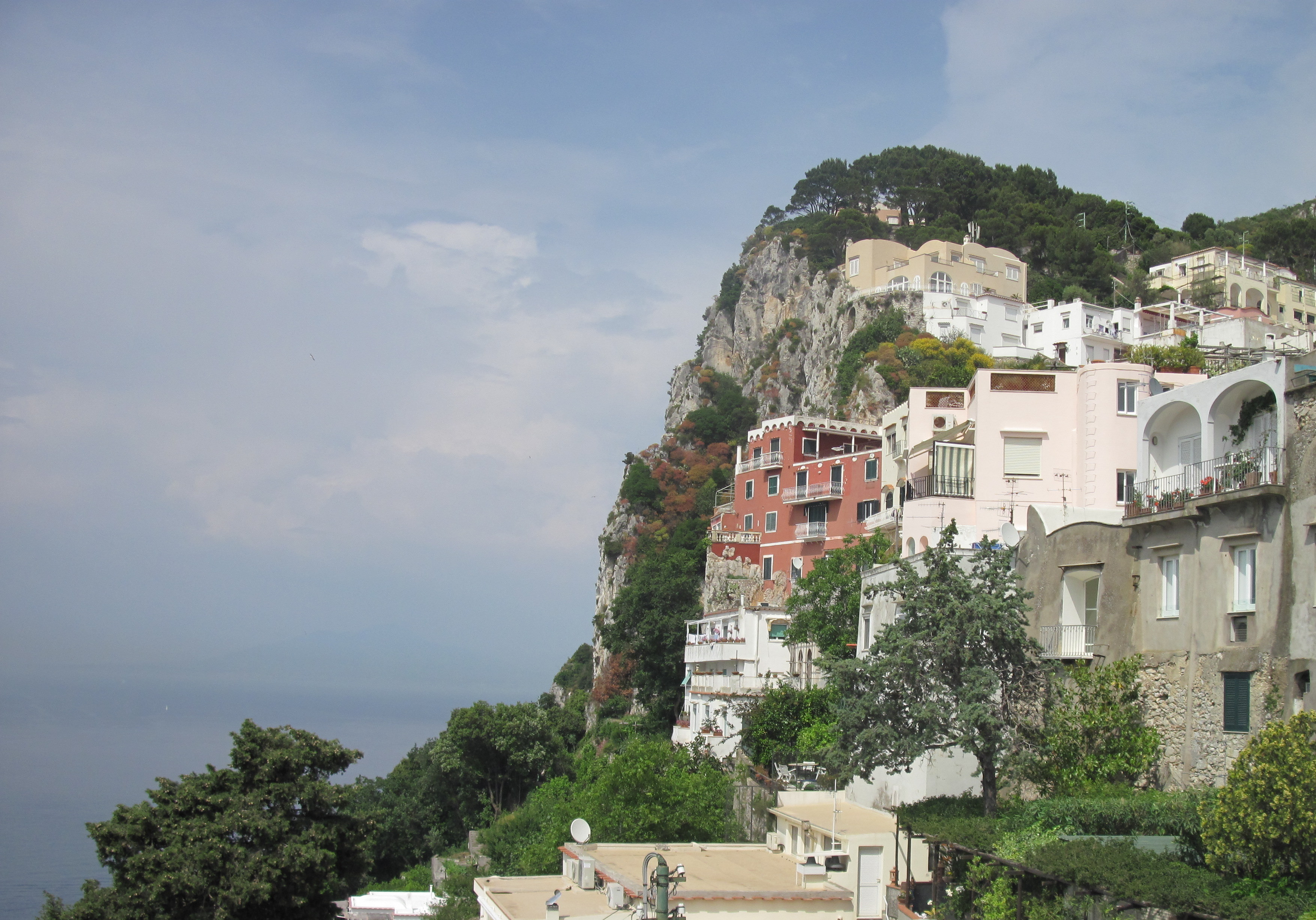
Villa Behring, where Maxim Gorky lived from 1909 to 1911

During the Napoleonic Wars, French troops occupied Capri in January 1806 but were ousted by the British in May. Britain established a naval base (a "Second Gibraltar") but caused damage to archaeological sites during construction. The French recaptured the island in 1808 and held it until 1815, when it was returned to the Bourbon Kingdom of Naples.

In the 19th century, naturalist Ignazio Cerio catalogued the island's flora and fauna. His work was continued by his son, Edwin Cerio, an author and engineer known for his writings on Capri life.

From the later 19th century, Capri became an increasingly popular resort for European artists, writers, and expatriates. It gained a reputation as a tolerant haven, attracting wealthy gay men and lesbians seeking a more open life than elsewhere in Europe. Notable figures who lived or spent significant time on the island include John Ellingham Brooks, Somerset Maugham, Norman Douglas, Jacques d'Adelswärd-Fersen, Christian Wilhelm Allers, Emil von Behring, Axel Munthe, Louis Coatalen, Maxim Gorky, Oscar Wilde (briefly), Compton Mackenzie, Romaine Brooks, Dame Gracie Fields, and Lenin (hosted by Gorky in 1908, establishing a Party School). A monument to Lenin by Giacomo Manzù was erected in 1970. Queen Victoria of Baden was a frequent visitor. German industrialist Friedrich Alfred Krupp funded archaeological work but left after a scandal involving accusations of homosexual orgies.

Today, Capri remains a major tourist destination, particularly popular during the summer months, attracting visitors from Italy and abroad.

== Notable people ==
- Jakob Johann von Uexküll (1864–1944), muscle physiologist, died in Capri

== Geography ==
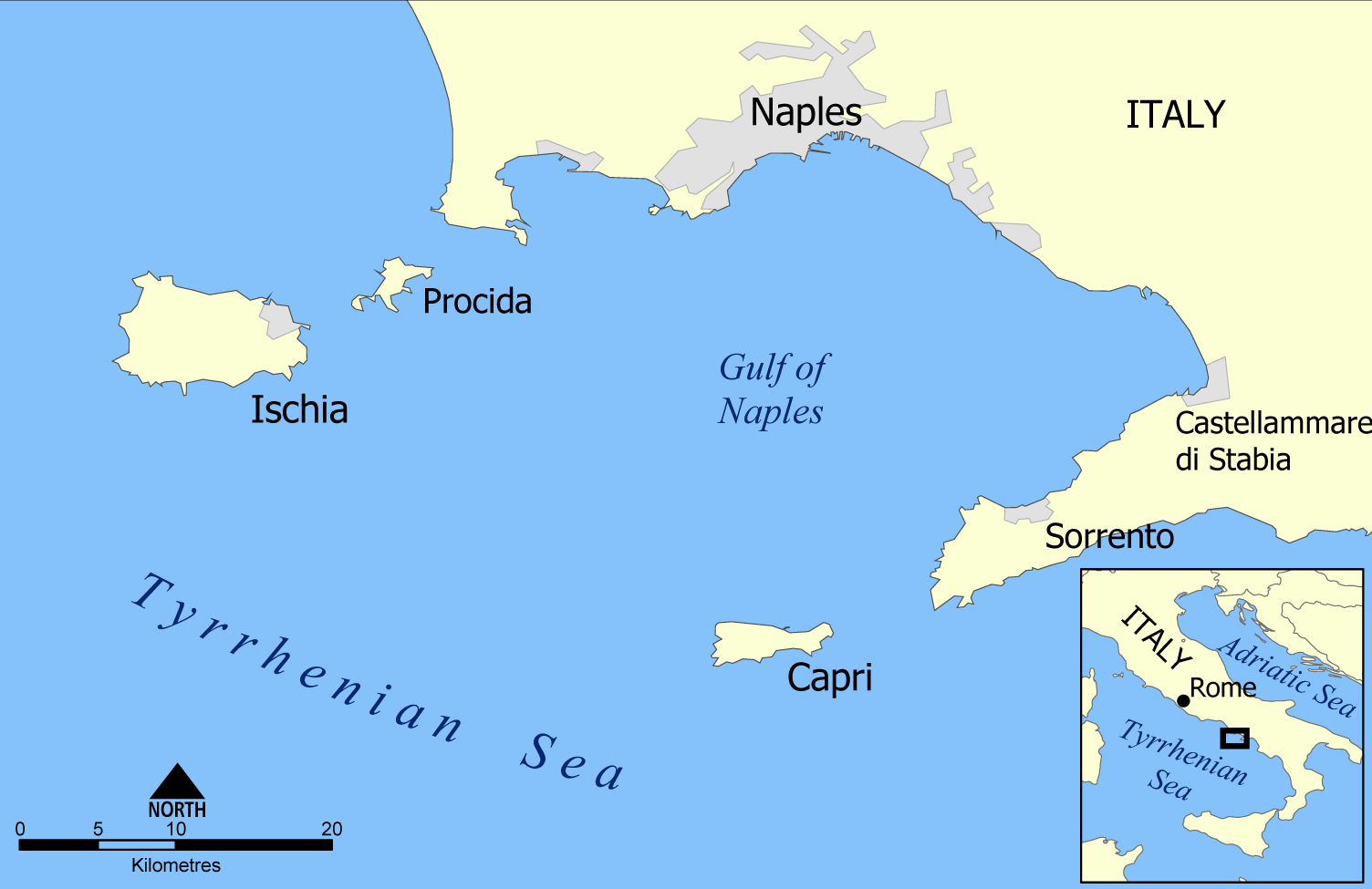
Location of Capri in the Gulf of Naples

Capri is located in the Tyrrhenian Sea at the western entrance to the Gulf of Naples, approximately 5 km from the mainland tip of the Sorrento Peninsula. The island has an area of 10.4 km^{2} (4.0 sq mi). The terrain is mountainous, consisting primarily of limestone and sandstone; steep cliffs dominate much of the coastline.

The highest point is Monte Solaro at 589 m (1,932 ft). The island's western part, culminating in Monte Solaro, is known as Anacapri, distinct from the eastern part centered around the town of Capri. The two main harbours are Marina Grande on the north coast (the primary port) and Marina Piccola on the south coast.

Notable natural features include the famous sea stacks known as the Faraglioni off the southeast coast, the Blue Grotto sea cave on the northwest coast, and the Arco Naturale, a large natural arch on the east coast.

=== Climate ===
Capri experiences a Mediterranean climate (Köppen: Csa). Summers are warm to hot and generally dry, while winters are mild and wet. Sub-zero temperatures are rare.

Climate data for Capri, elevation 160 m (520 ft), (1991–2020 normals)
Month	Jan	Feb	Mar	Apr	May	Jun	Jul	Aug	Sep	Oct	Nov	Dec	Year
Record high °C (°F)	20.8 (69.4)	22.6 (72.7)	28.2 (82.8)	32.2 (90.0)	36.4 (97.5)	38.0 (100.4)	39.8 (103.6)	42.9 (109.2)	36.2 (97.2)	32.2 (90.0)	27.6 (81.7)	21.4 (70.5)	42.9 (109.2)
Mean daily maximum °C (°F)	13.7 (56.7)	14.3 (57.7)	16.8 (62.2)	19.8 (67.6)	24.4 (75.9)	28.7 (83.7)	31.7 (89.1)	32.4 (90.3)	28.3 (82.9)	23.5 (74.3)	18.3 (64.9)	14.6 (58.3)	22.2 (72.0)
Daily mean °C (°F)	10.9 (51.6)	10.7 (51.3)	12.7 (54.9)	15.4 (59.7)	19.6 (67.3)	23.8 (74.8)	26.4 (79.5)	27.0 (80.6)	23.5 (74.3)	19.5 (67.1)	15.3 (59.5)	12.0 (53.6)	18.1 (64.5)
Mean daily minimum °C (°F)	8.7 (47.7)	8.2 (46.8)	9.8 (49.6)	12.1 (53.8)	15.8 (60.4)	19.9 (67.8)	22.3 (72.1)	23.0 (73.4)	19.9 (67.8)	16.6 (61.9)	12.9 (55.2)	9.9 (49.8)	14.9 (58.9)
Record low °C (°F)	−0.2 (31.6)	−0.4 (31.3)	1.2 (34.2)	2.8 (37.0)	8.6 (47.5)	10.0 (50.0)	10.0 (50.0)	14.8 (58.6)	10.8 (51.4)	5.8 (42.4)	0.0 (32.0)	0.0 (32.0)	−0.4 (31.3)
Average precipitation mm (inches)	71.4 (2.81)	58.1 (2.29)	52.7 (2.07)	40.4 (1.59)	25.8 (1.02)	16.2 (0.64)	10.9 (0.43)	23.9 (0.94)	58.4 (2.30)	87.6 (3.45)	95.6 (3.76)	84.9 (3.34)	625.9 (24.64)
Average precipitation days	8.3	6.8	6.7	5.5	3.9	2.3	1.3	1.7	5.5	6.7	9.4	8.9	67
Average relative humidity (%)	70.5	68.6	69.7	69.4	68.4	67.9	67.1	67.4	67.3	70.4	71.9	70.2	69.1
Average dew point °C (°F)	5.5 (41.9)	4.9 (40.8)	7.0 (44.6)	9.4 (48.9)	13.1 (55.6)	17.0 (62.6)	19.3 (66.7)	20.3 (68.5)	16.7 (62.1)	13.9 (57.0)	10.1 (50.2)	6.4 (43.5)	12.0 (53.5)
Source: NOAA/NCEI

== Demographics ==
Historical population
Year	Pop.	±%
1861	4,196	—
1871	4,213	+0.4%
1881	4,848	+15.1%
1901	6,206	+28.0%
1911	6,838	+10.2%
1921	7,496	+9.6%
1931	7,701	+2.7%
1936	7,984	+3.7%
1951	9,292	+16.4%
1961	10,845	+16.7%
1971	11,962	+10.3%
1981	12,112	+1.3%
1991	12,399	+2.4%
2001	12,919	+4.2%
2011	13,377	+3.5%
2021	13,709	+2.5%
Source: ISTAT

As of 2026, the population is 13,451, of which 49.4% are male, and 50.6% are female. Minors make up 13.1% of the population, and seniors make up 24.9%.

=== Immigration ===
As of 2025, immigrants make up 12.8% of the population.

== Administration ==
The island is divided into two municipalities:

- Capri
- Anacapri

These are administratively part of the Metropolitan City of Naples, which is part of the Campania region.

== Main sights ==
Notable sights include:

- Arco Naturale
- Blue Grotto (Grotta Azzurra)
- Capri Philosophical Park
- Certosa di San Giacomo (Charterhouse, contains museum dedicated to painter Karl Wilhelm Diefenbach)
- Faraglioni (sea stacks)
- Gardens of Augustus
- Marina Grande (main port)
- Marina Piccola (small harbour)
- Monte Solaro (highest point, accessible by chairlift)
- Piazza Umberto I (The Piazzetta)
- Punta Carena Lighthouse
- Torre Materita
- Via Krupp (historic switchback path, often closed due to landslide risk)
- Villa Jovis (ruins of Tiberius's main villa)
- Villa Lysis (built by Jacques d'Adelswärd-Fersen)
- Villa Malaparte (modern architectural landmark)
- Villa San Michele (built by Axel Munthe in Anacapri)

== Culture ==
=== In arts and literature ===
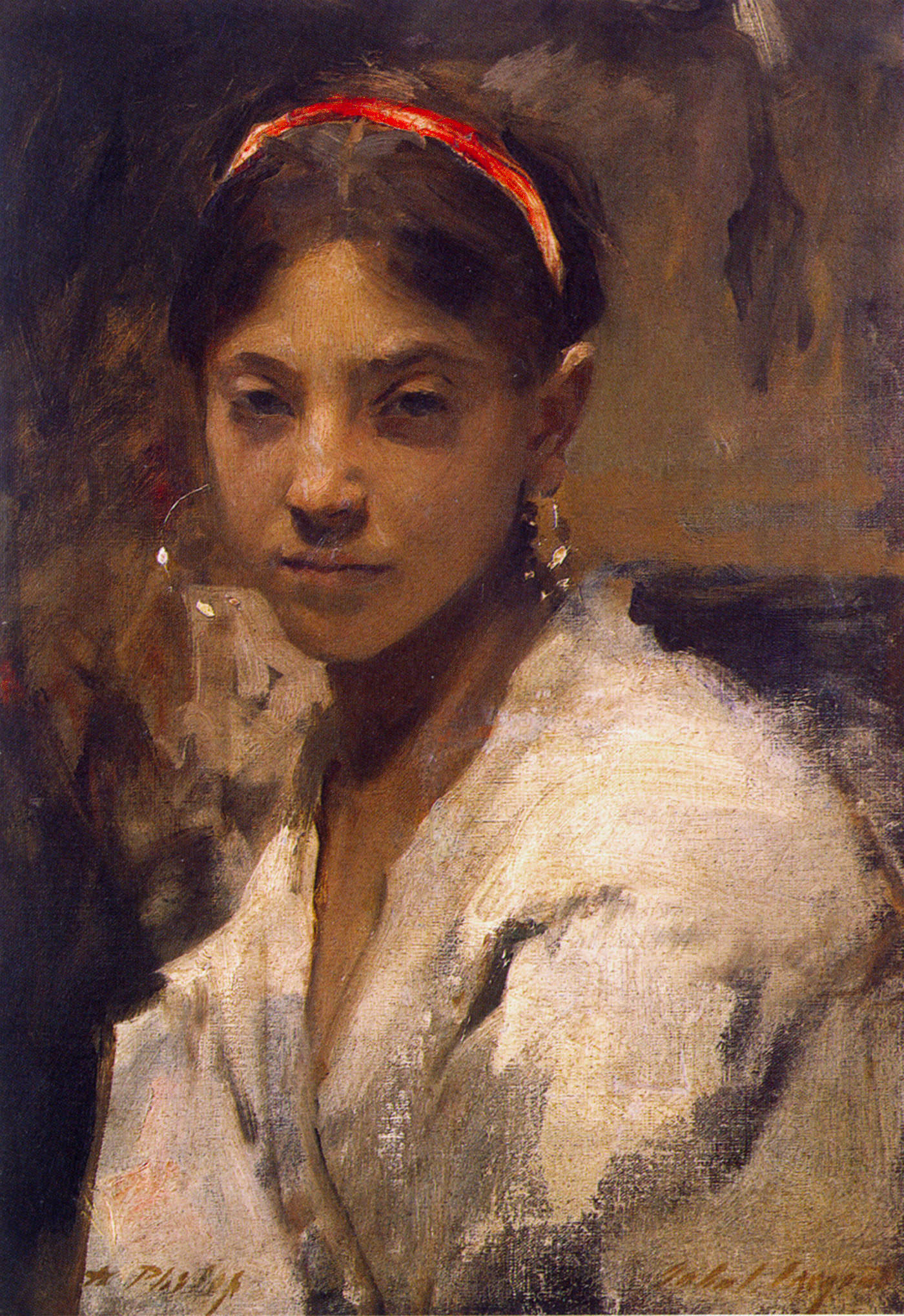
John Singer Sargent: Head of a Capri Girl, 1878

During the latter half of the 19th century and early 20th century, Capri became a popular destination and residence for European artists, writers, and other prominent figures. August Kopisch's account of his 1826 rediscovery of the Blue Grotto significantly boosted the island's profile.

Painters John Singer Sargent, Frank Hyde, and Charles Caryl Coleman worked on the island. Writers who set works on Capri or lived there include Norman Douglas (South Wind), Compton Mackenzie (Vestal Fire, Extraordinary Women), Jacques d'Adelswärd-Fersen (Et le feu s'éteignit sur la mer), Somerset Maugham ("The Lotus Eater"), and Maxim Gorky. Notable memoirs set on the island include Axel Munthe's The Story of San Michele, Edwin Cerio's Aria di Capri, and Shirley Hazzard's Greene on Capri: A Memoir about Graham Greene. Claude Debussy titled one of his préludes Les collines d'Anacapri (1910).

=== Annual events ===
Capri hosts numerous annual events, including religious festivals, cultural happenings, and traditional celebrations. Key events include:

- Festival of San Costanzo (patron saint of Capri town) – May 14
- Festival of Sant'Antonio (patron saint of Anacapri) – June 13
- International Folklore Festival (Anacapri) – August
- Settembrata Anacaprese (Anacapri harvest festival) – September
- Capri Hollywood International Film Festival – Late December/early January
Other local events (may require independent verification of notability)
- Capri Art Film Festival
- Capri Tango Festival
- Capri Hollywood
- Eventi Villa San Michele
- Premio San Michele
- Premio Faraglioni
- Premio Cari dell Enigma
- Maraton del Golfo Capri

=== Food ===
Capri is known in Campania for its marjoram, which has a dominant presence in the famous local dish of caciotta-filled ravioli. Locally, it is held that pasta e piselli (lit. 'pasta with peas') is a specialty, and numerous versions are cooked, including with prosciutto or pancetta, and fats including prosciutto fat, oil or butter. It is almost always made with short tube pasta.

== Economy ==
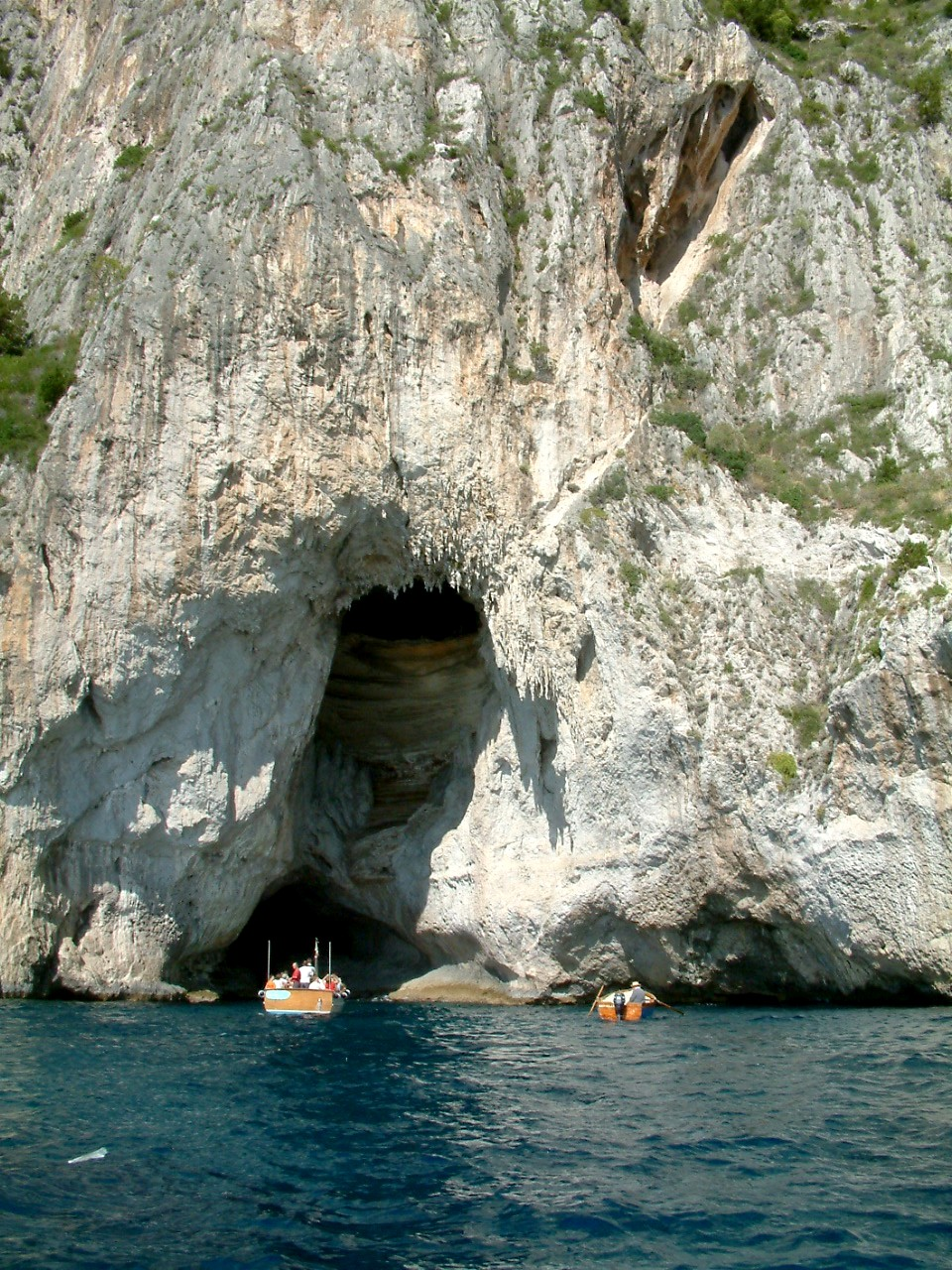
Grotta Meravigliosa sea cave.

Capri's economy is mostly based on tourism. The island has been a major resort destination since the 19th century, attracting visitors from Italy and internationally. During summer, particularly July and August, the island experiences a large influx of tourists, including many day-trippers arriving by ferry from Naples and the Sorrento Peninsula. The central Piazza Umberto I, commonly known as the Piazzetta, is the hub of social life and tourism in Capri town.

The island is known for upscale hotels, shopping (including luxury brands and local products like Limoncello and handmade leather sandals, and restaurants. Agriculture is very limited, though some wine and olive oil are produced locally. Handicrafts also contribute to the economy. The popularity of the island has led to concerns about overtourism, particularly during peak season, with discussions about measures to limit day-tripper numbers. The international luxury linen brand 100% Capri originated on the island.

== Transport ==
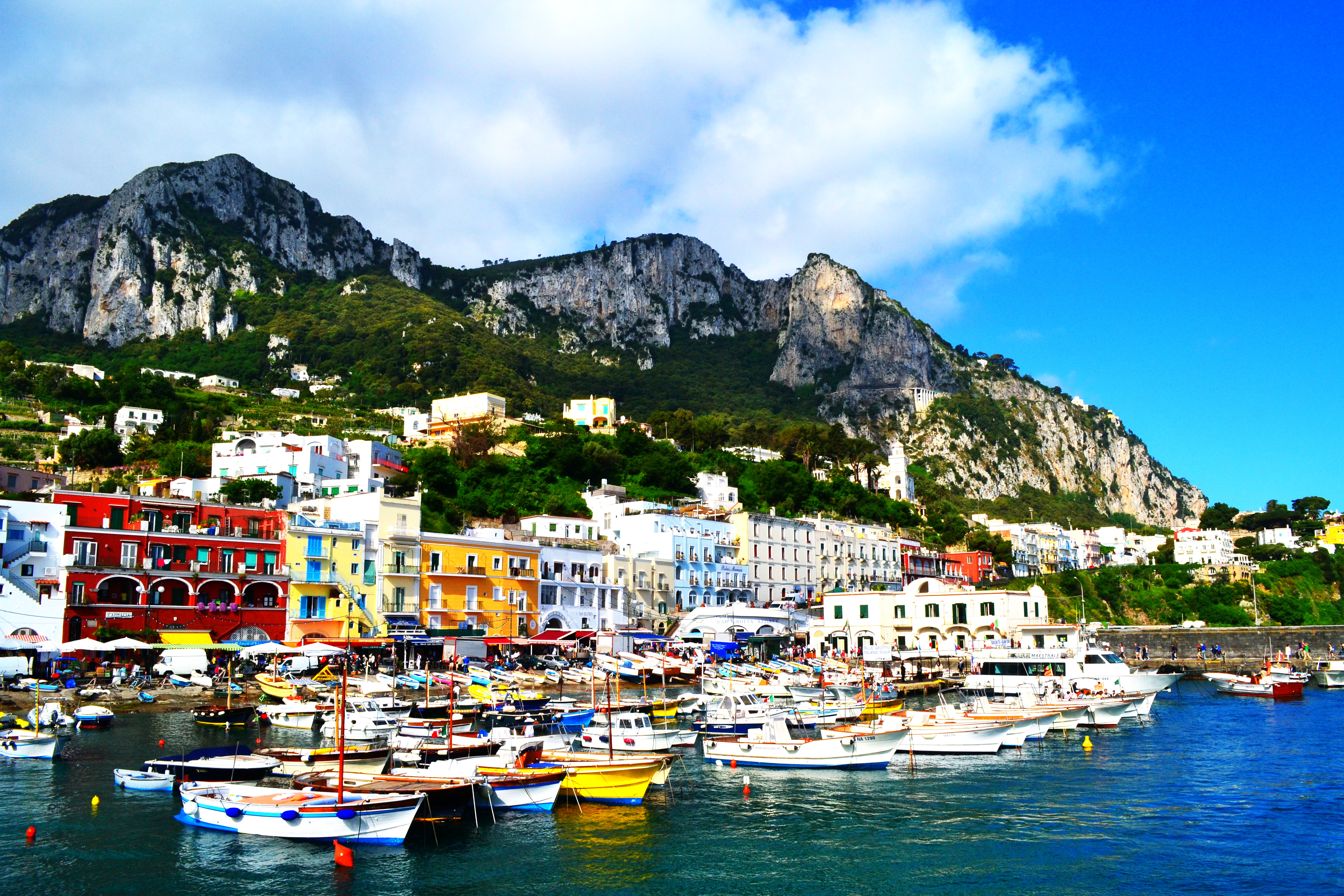
Marina Grande, the main harbour of Capri

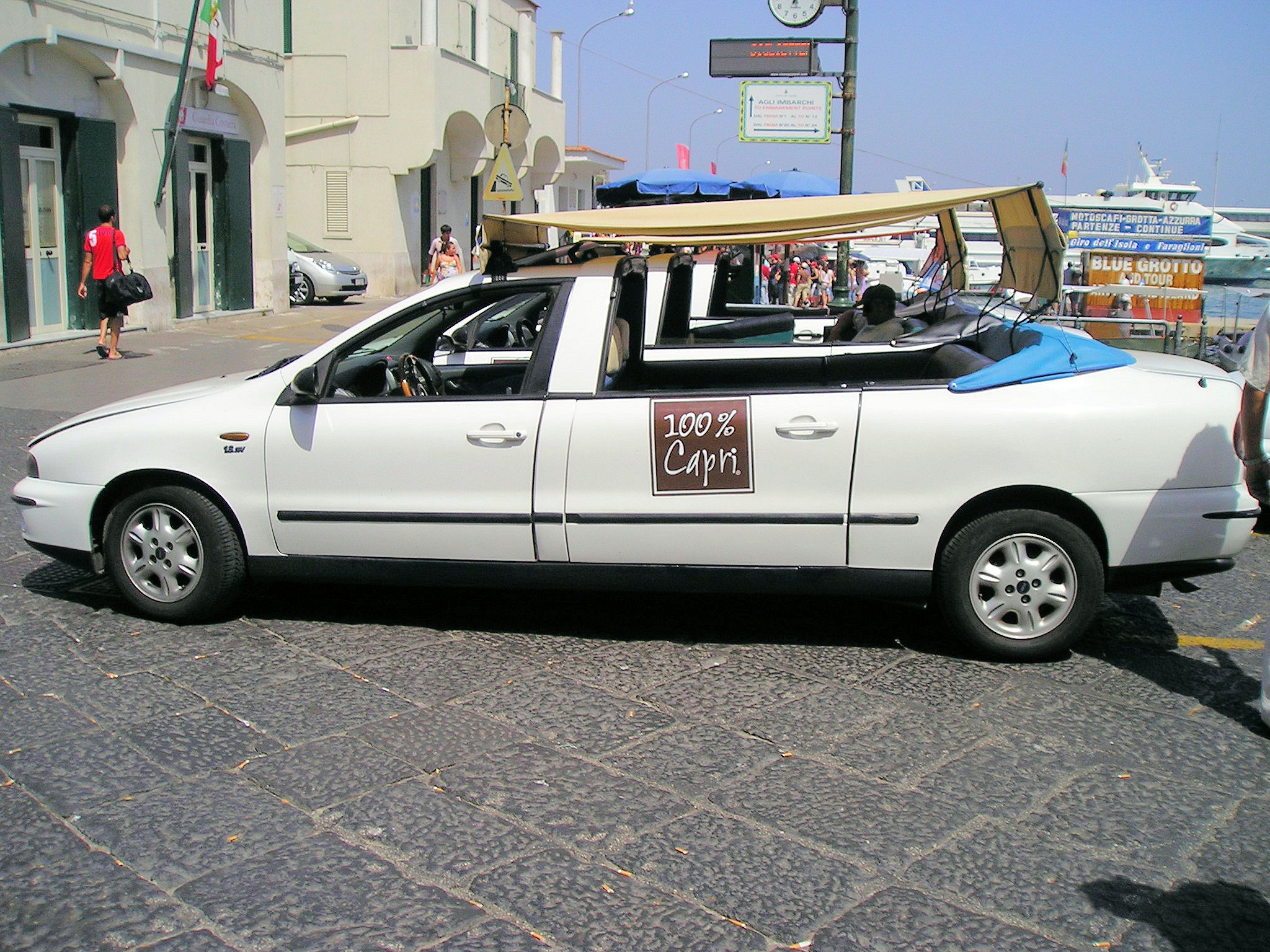
Typical open-top taxi used on the island

Capri is accessible via ferry and hydrofoil services operating from Naples (ports of Molo Beverello and Calata di Massa), Sorrento, Positano, and Amalfi. Services also run from Ischia and other locations during the summer months.

Boats arrive at Marina Grande. From there, the Capri Funicular ascends to Capri town centre (the Piazzetta). A public bus network connects Marina Grande, Capri town, Marina Piccola, Anacapri, the Blue Grotto, and other points. Taxis, often open-top limousine-style cars, are also available.

Vehicle access for non-residents is heavily restricted for much of the year (typically April to November), due to the island's narrow roads. Visitors generally rely on public transport, taxis, or walking.

=== Airports ===
The island does not have an airport. The nearest airports are:

- Naples International Airport (NAP)
- Salerno Costa d'Amalfi Airport (QSR)

== International relations ==
=== Twin towns – sister cities ===
The town of Capri is twinned with:

- Crosby, Merseyside, United Kingdom
- (Palestine) Bethlehem, Israeli-administered regions (Palestinian Authority)

== See also ==
- Amalfi Coast – Coastal area in the Campania region, Italy
- Ischia – Volcanic island in the Tyrrhenian Sea
- List of islands of Italy
- Procida
- Via Vittorio Emanuele III
