= Certosa di San Giacomo =

Museum and former monastery in Capri, Italy

St. James Charterhouse
- Certosa di San Giacomo
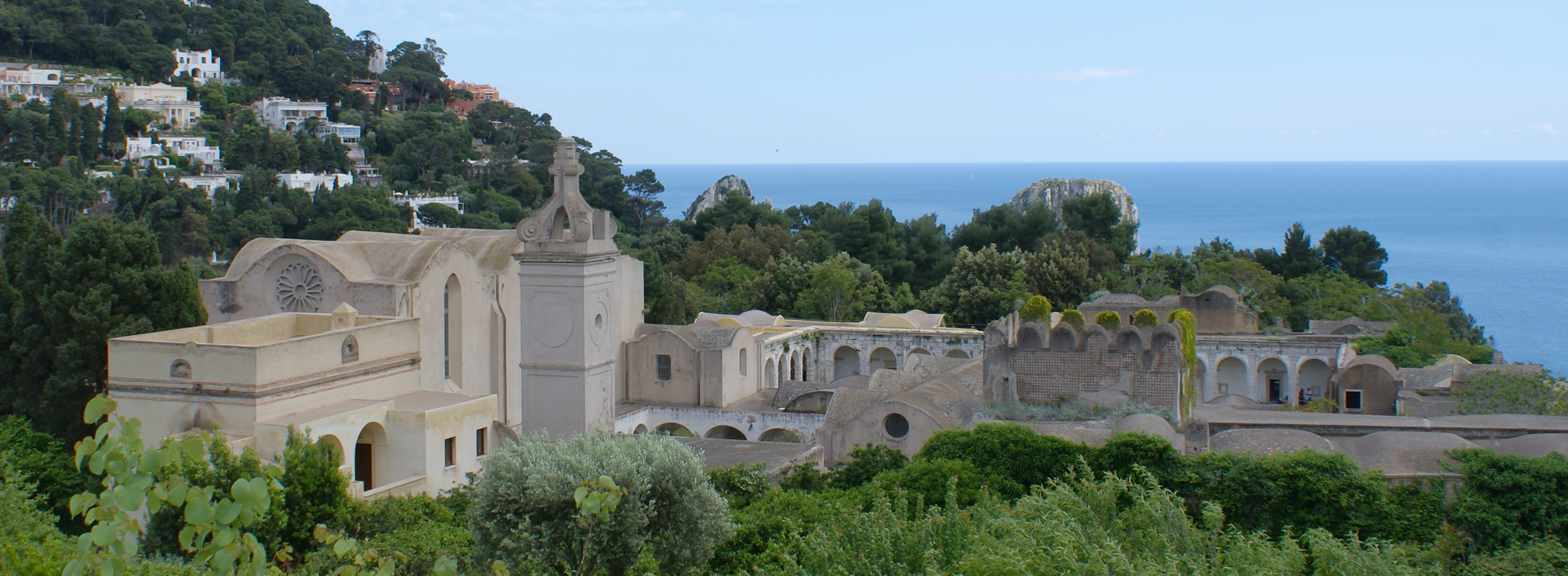
- The charterhouse seen from the Northwest.

- Location within Italy
- Interactive map of St. James Charterhouse

Monastery information
- Order: Carthusian
- Established: 1371
- Disestablished: 1808
- Diocese: Capri

People
- Founder: Giacomo Arcucci

Site
- Location: Via Certosa 10, Capri, Campania
- Country: Italy
- Coordinates: 40°32′51″N 14°14′43″E
- Visible remains: Substantial
- Public access: Yes

The Charterhouse of St. James (Italian: Certosa di San Giacomo) was a Carthusian charterhouse founded in 1363 by Giacomo Arcucci on the island of Capri, in southern Italy. It is now a museum and is used for cultural events.

The buildings that formed the charterhouse have three main areas: the pharmacy and women's church, the buildings for monks, and those for guests. The Great Cloister (Chiostro Grande) is of a late Renaissance design, while the Small Cloister (Chiostro Piccolo) features Roman marble columns.

== History ==
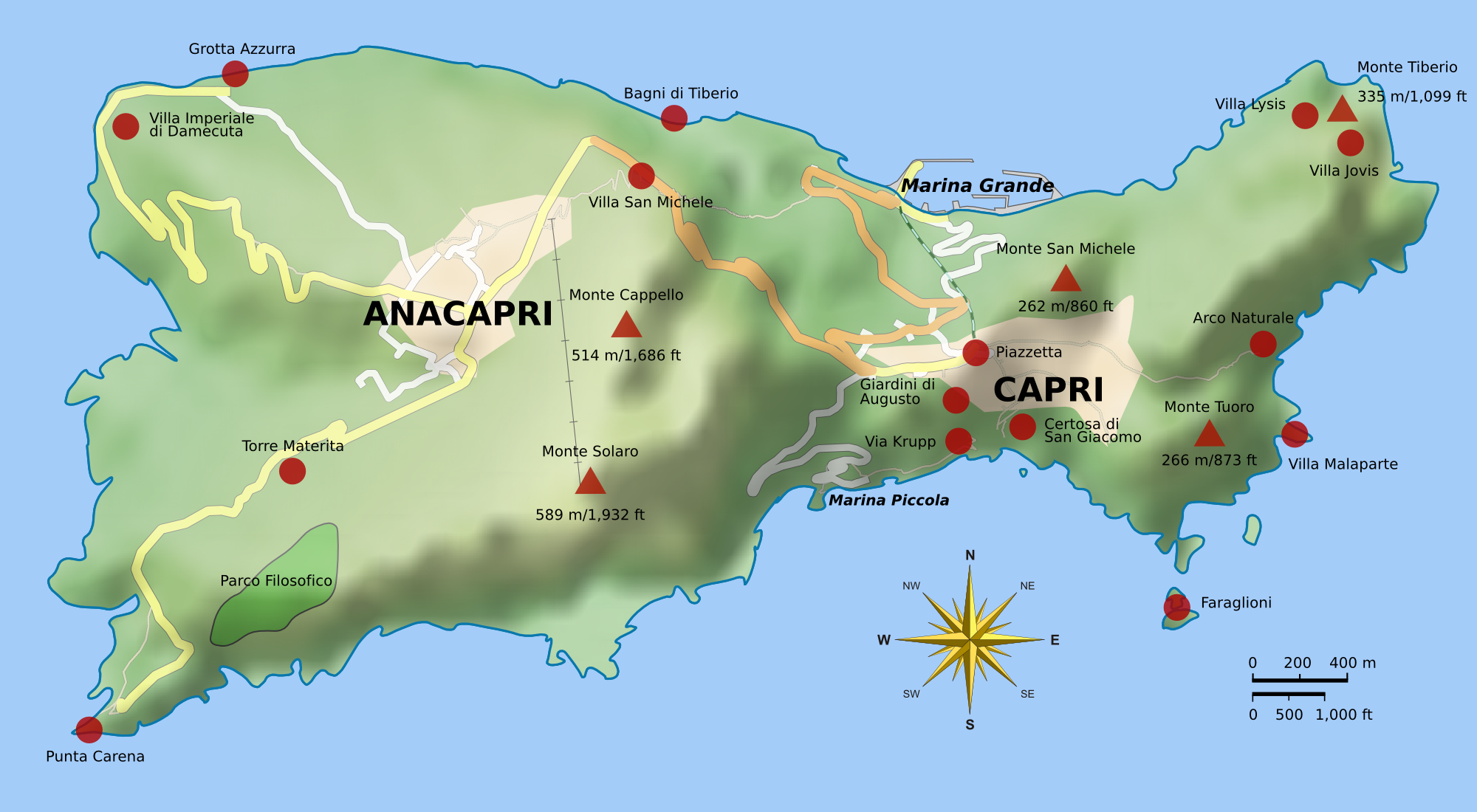
Map showing the location of Certosa di San Giacomo on Capri east of Marina Piccola.

Count Giacomo Arcucci, a secretary to Joan I of Naples, established the charterhouse in 1371. He later became a monk himself in 1386.

In 1553 the monastery was restored and fortified and a tower was erected which collapsed in the 18th century.

There was often conflict between the islanders and the monks, who owned land as well as grazing and hunting rights. During the 1656 plague in Capri, the monks sealed themselves off, whereupon the islanders threw their corpses over the wall of the monastery in retribution.

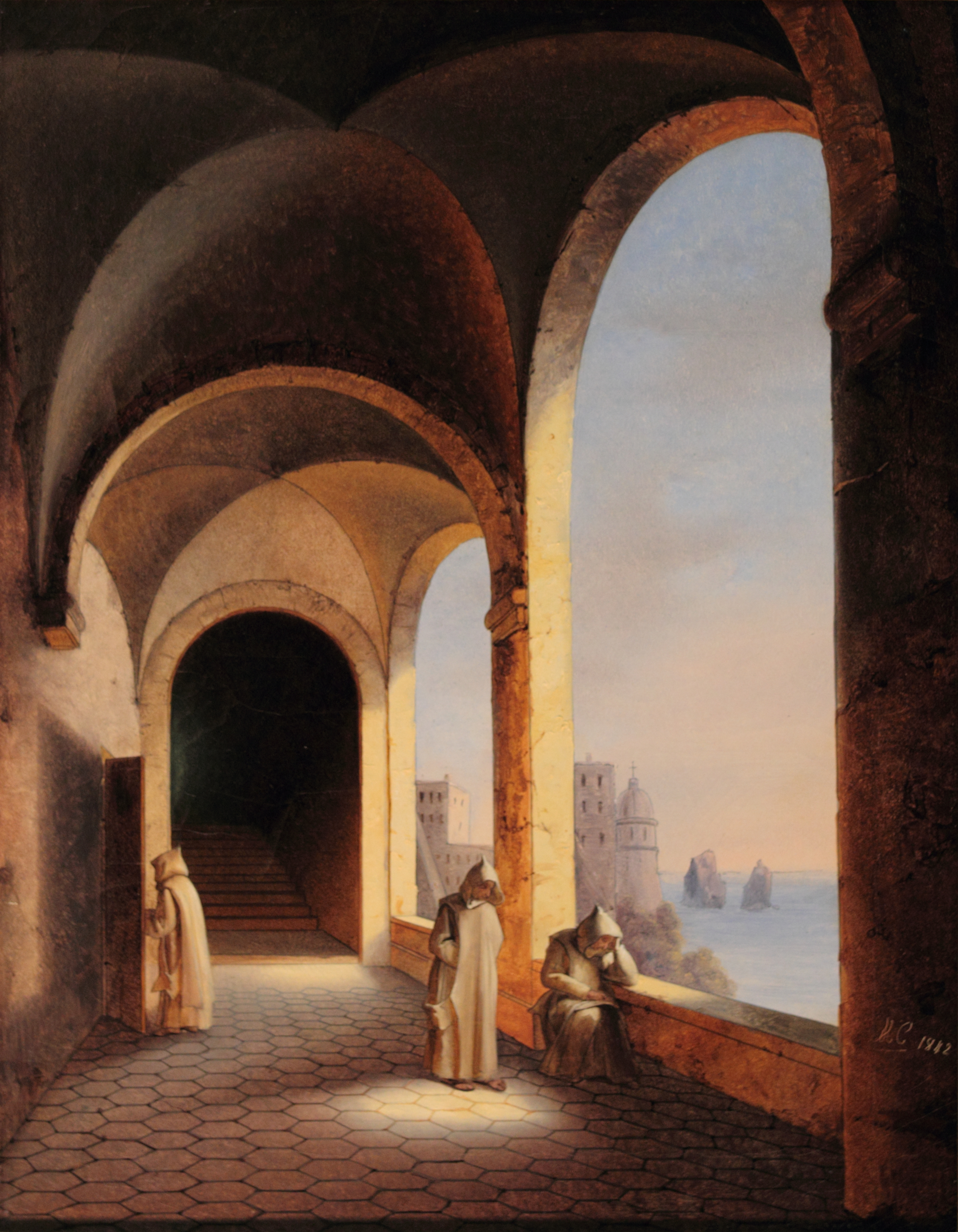
Frères dans la Chartreuse de San Giacomo à Capri, a painting by Princess Caroline of Naples and Sicily.

Since 1974 the charterhouse houses the Karl Wilhelm Diefenbach museum among others and is used for cultural events. A high school is also on the premises.
