= Palazzo a Mare =

Archaeological site in Capri, Italy

Coordinates: 40°33′30.24″N 14°14′5.61″E

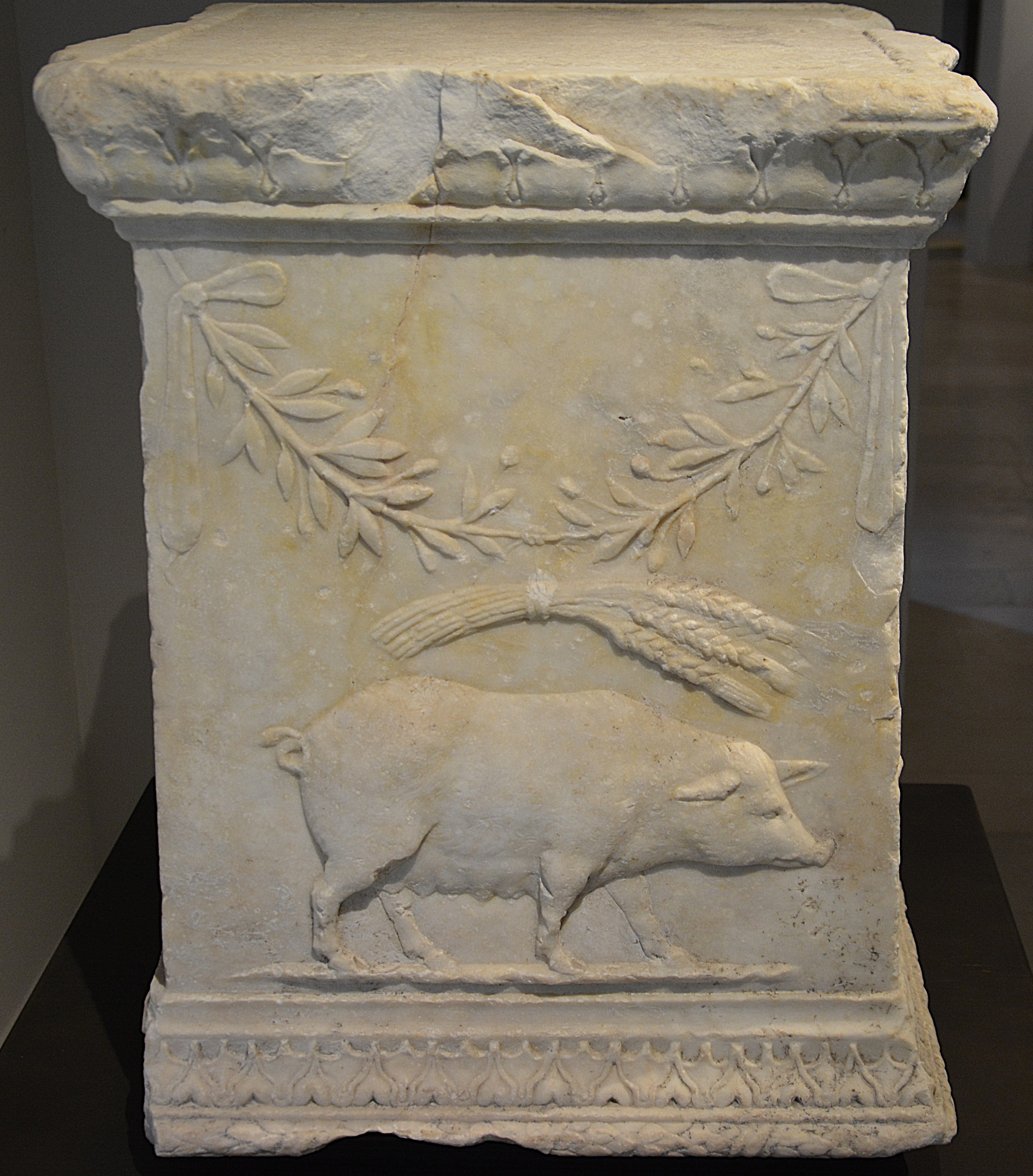
A stone-carved relief from the Palazzo a Mare, now in the Archaeological Museum of Capri

Palazzo a Mare (Italian: [paˈlattso a mˈmaːre]; translation: "Sea Palace"; alternative, Palatium) is a well-preserved ancient Roman archaeological site on the north side of the island of Capri, consisting of an imperial palace built by Augustus and modified by Tiberius. It was one of the supposed twelve villas of Tiberius on the island as described by Tacitus, along with the Villa Jovis, Villa di Gradola and Villa Damecuta. It covers a very large area on several terraces overlooking the sea.

The palace was equipped with a semicircular nymphaeum. The excavations were carried out by Amedeo Maiuri starting from 1932.

In 1903, the Royal Geographical Society described it as:

By far the most extensive Roman remains upon the Capri littoral are those known as the Palazzo a Mare, one of the largest of the twelve villas of Tiberius, and therefore dating from about 27 to 37 A.D. The buildings not only covered considerable ground on the top of the cliffs, which were buttressed by strong walls, but also extended down to the beach, where the north wing was thrown out towards the sea, and must have made a charming abode in summer. As seen from tho sea, a semioiroular exedra of opus reticulatum halfway up the face of the cliff is one of the most conspicuous features of the ruins. It is built so as to cover the middle third of the height of the cliff facing Vesuvius. Many fragments of walls lie in the water below, having been undermined by the sea; but as they have fallen from uncertain levels, they do not supply us with data as reliable as those to be derived from the western portions of the building still in situ.
