= Faraglioni =

Italian term used to refer to rock stacks

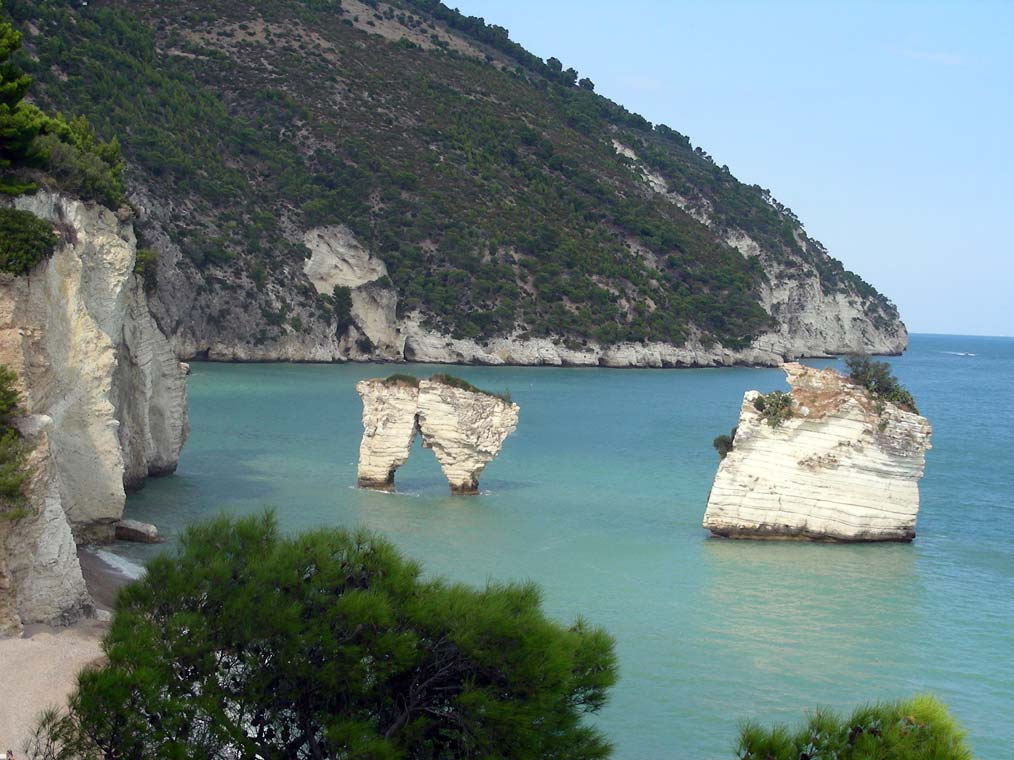
Faraglioni in Zagare Bay, Gargano National Park, Apulia

In Italian, faraglioni (pronounced [faraʎˈʎoːni]; Neapolitan: faragliune [faraʝˈʝuːnə]; singular faraglione in both languages) are stacks, coastal and oceanic rock formations eroded by waves.

The word may be derived from the Greek pháros or Latin pharus ("lighthouse") and is cognate with the Spanish farallón.

They are found at the coasts of several regions of Italy:

== Apulia faraglioni ==
In the Apulia region, examples of faraglioni can be found along the Adriatic coast of the Salento peninsula: Le Due Sorelle (The Two Sisters) in Torre Dell'Orso and the Faraglioni di Sant'Andrea. On the Gargano peninsula, there are two faraglioni in Zagare Bay near Mattinata that are protected within Gargano National Park.

== Capri faraglioni ==
In the Campania region, there are three famous faraglioni in the Bay of Naples, off the island of Capri. Part of the Campanian Archipelago, they are named:

- Stella, connected to the island; 109 metres (358 ft) high.
- Mezzo; 82 metres (269 ft) high.
- Scopolo (or Fuori); 106 metres (348 ft) high. The blue lizard or lucertola azzurra (Podarcis siculus coeruleus) is endemic to this faraglione.

== See also ==
- Stack (geology)
- Coastal and oceanic landforms
- Faraglioni di Capri

== Gallery ==
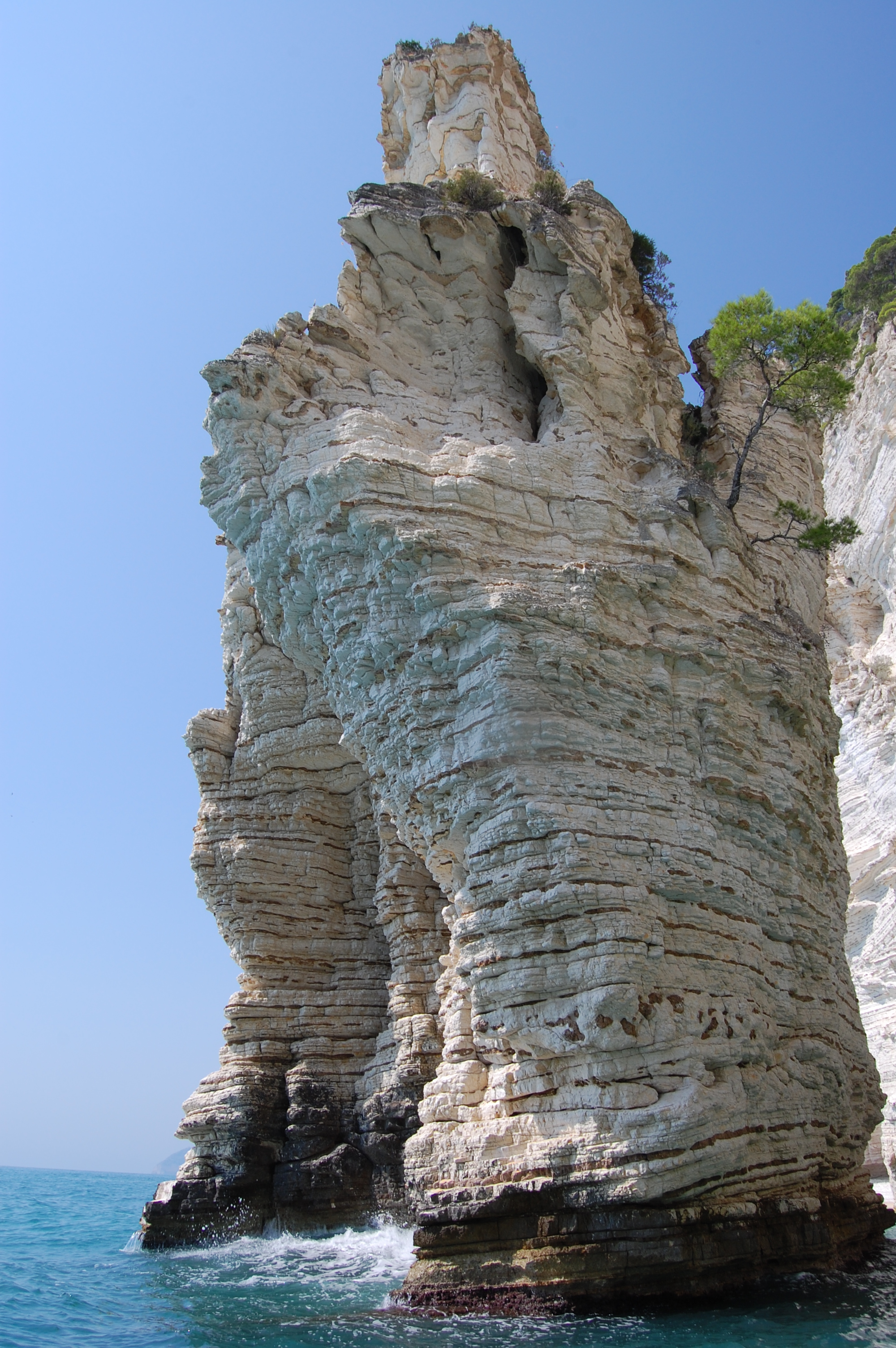
A faraglione in the Gargano National Park, Apulia

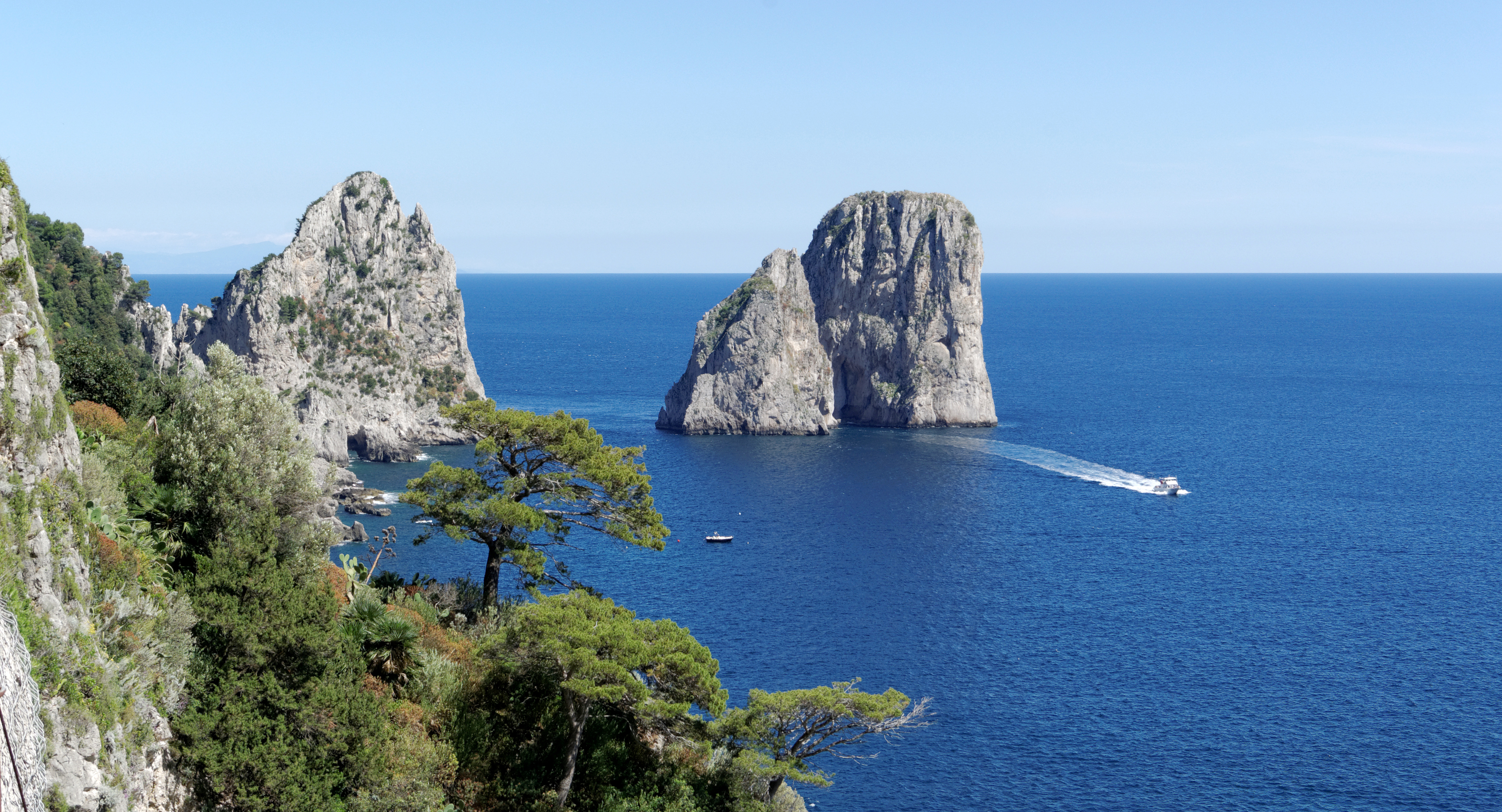
Viewed from west, Capri

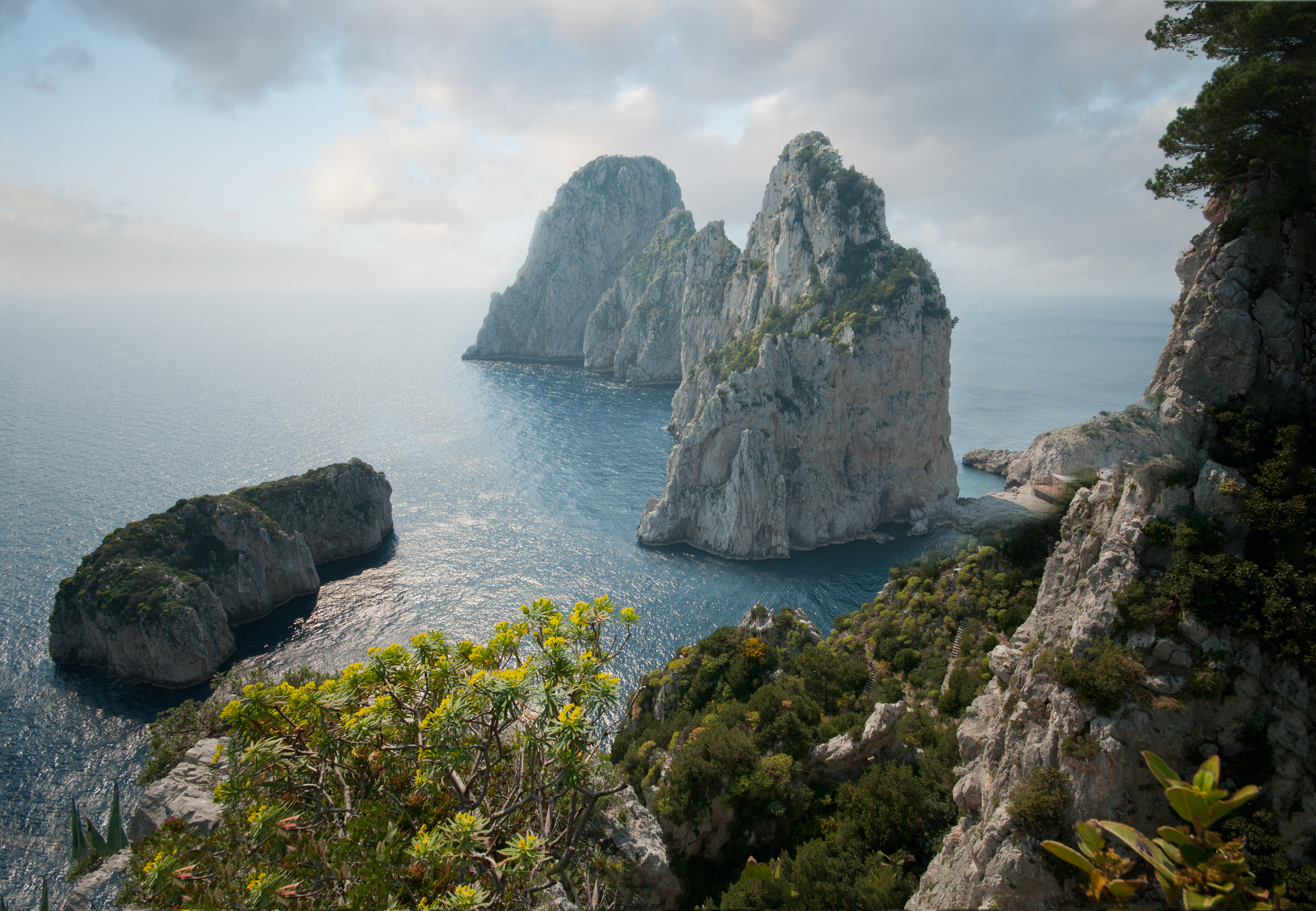
Viewed from east, Capri

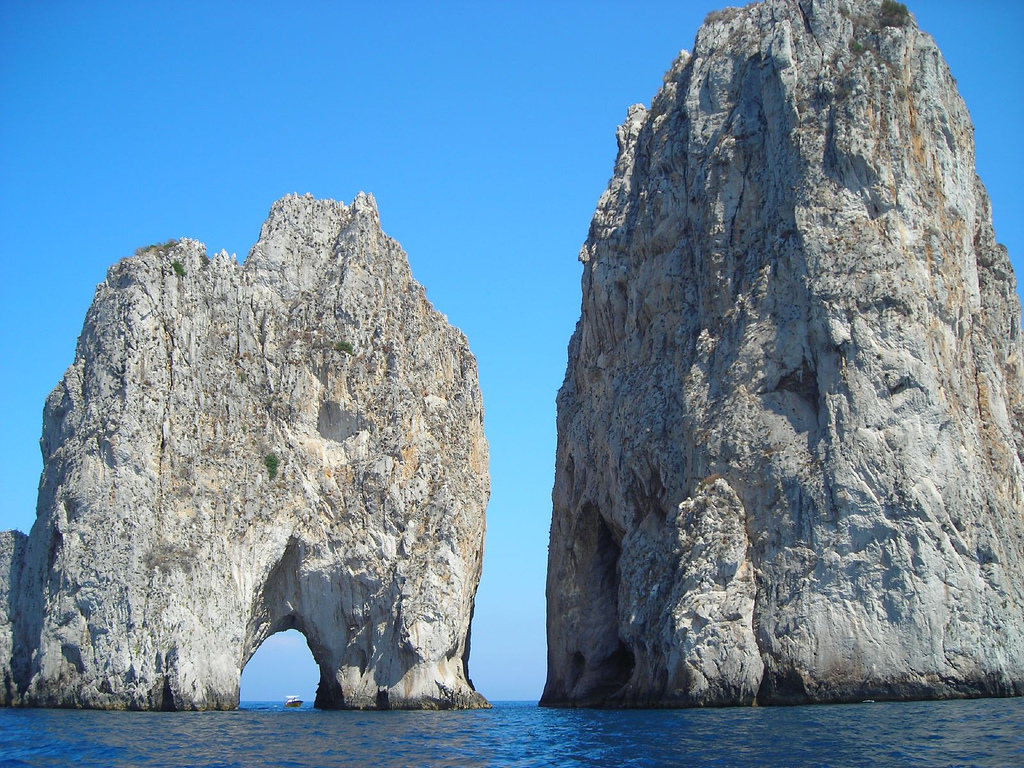
Viewed from a boat, Capri
