= Capri (town) =

Town on the island of Capri, Italy

- Comune
- Comune di Capri
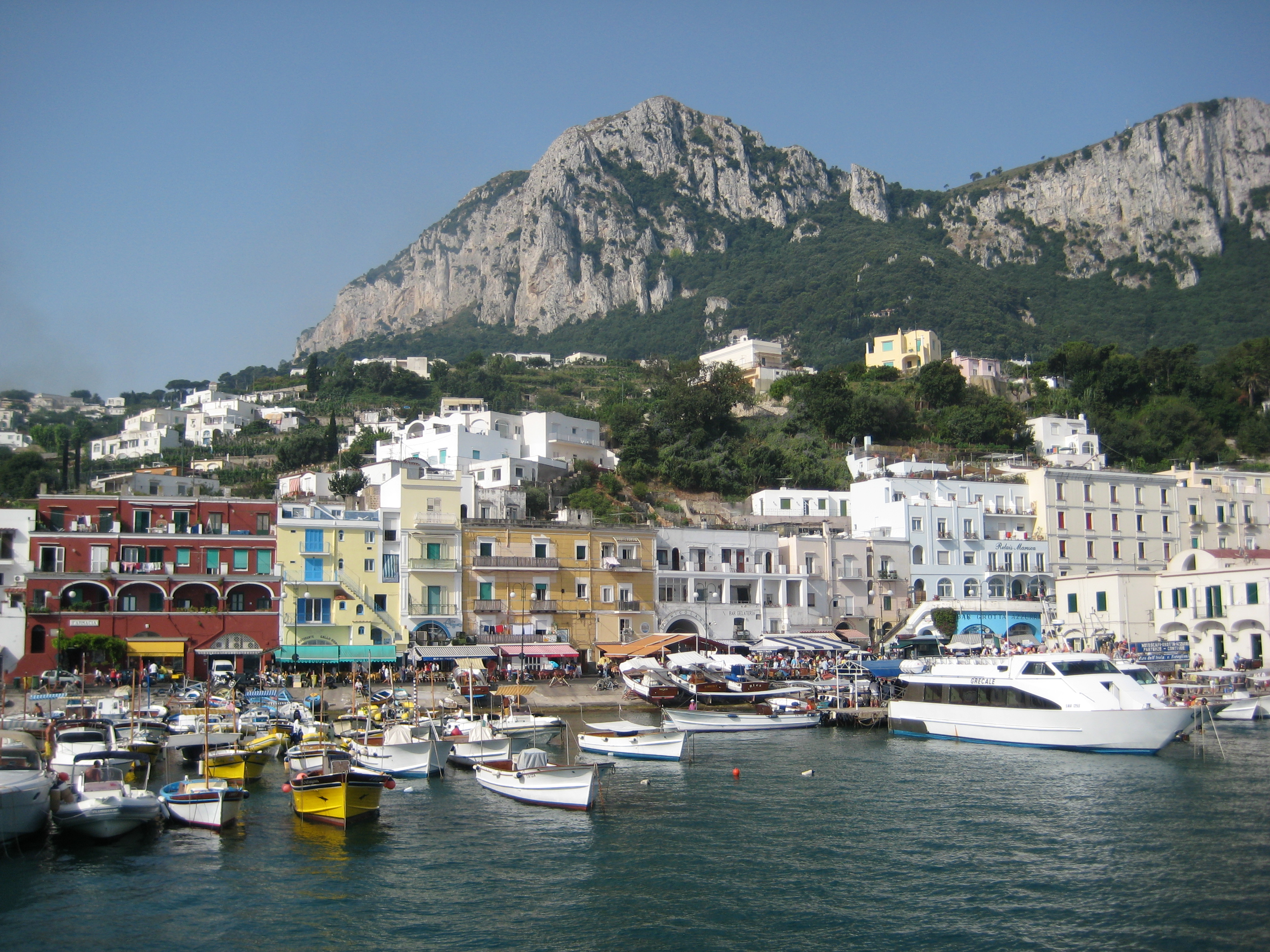
- Capri harbor (Marina Grande) and waterfront

- Coat of arms

- Location of Capri in Italy Capri (Campania)
- Coordinates: 40°33′N 14°15′E
- Country: Italy
- Region: Campania
- Metropolitan city: Naples (NA)

Government
  - Mayor: Paolo Falco

Area
  - Total: 4.06 km^{2} (1.57 sq mi)

Population (2026)
  - Total: 6,705
  - Density: 1,650/km^{2} (4,280/sq mi)
- Demonym: Capresi
- Time zone: UTC+1 (CET)
  - Summer (DST): UTC+2 (CEST)
- Postal code: 80073
- Dialing code: 081
- Patron saint: Saint Constantius of Capri
- Saint day: May 14
- Website: Official website

Capri is a town and comune (municipality) situated on the island of Capri in the Metropolitan City of Naples in the region of Campania in Italy. It comprises the centre and east of the island, while the west belongs to Anacapri. It has 6,705 inhabitants.

== Demographics ==
As of 2026, the population is 6,705, of which 49.8% are male, and 50.2% are female. Minors make up 11.4% of the population, and seniors make up 26.9%.

Historical population

Year	Pop.	±%
1861	2,559	—
1871	2,374	−7.2%
1881	2,827	+19.1%
1901	3,890	+37.6%
1911	4,462	+14.7%
1921	5,059	+13.4%
1931	5,189	+2.6%
1936	5,371	+3.5%

Year	Pop.	±%
1951	6,209	+15.6%
1961	7,266	+17.0%
1971	7,723	+6.3%
1981	7,479	−3.2%
1991	7,075	−5.4%
2001	7,064	−0.2%
2011	6,831	−3.3%
2021	6,827	−0.1%

Source: ISTAT

=== Immigration ===
As of 2025, immigrants make up 15.1% of the population. The 5 largest foreign countries of birth are Sri Lanka, Ukraine, Romania, Albania, and Argentina.

== Main sights ==
Sights in the municipality include Via Camerelle, Via Krupp, Faraglioni, Arco Naturale, Villa Lysis, Villa Malaparte. The Palazzo a Mare are the most extensive Roman remains upon Capri's littoral zone.

- Marina Grande, port of Capri
- Piazza Umberto I, the Piazzetta
- Certosa di San Giacomo, with a view to the port Marina Piccola
- Villa Jovis

=== Churches ===
- Chiesa di San Costanzo
- Chiesa di Santo Stefano
- Chiesa di Sant'Anna
- Chiesa di S. Michele
- Chiesa di S. Maria del soccorso
- Chiesa di S. Andrea
- Chiesa di Costantinopoli
- Cimitero acattolico di Capri

== Economy ==
The international luxury linen clothing brand 100% Capri opened its first boutique in Capri in 2000.

== Transport ==
There are ferries and hydrofoil to the port of Capri from Naples' ports of Mergellina and Molo Beverello, Sorrento, Positano and Amalfi. From the port of Marina Grande, the Capri funicular climbs to Capri town above.

The nearest airport is Napoli-Capodichino Airport (NAP).

== Gallery ==
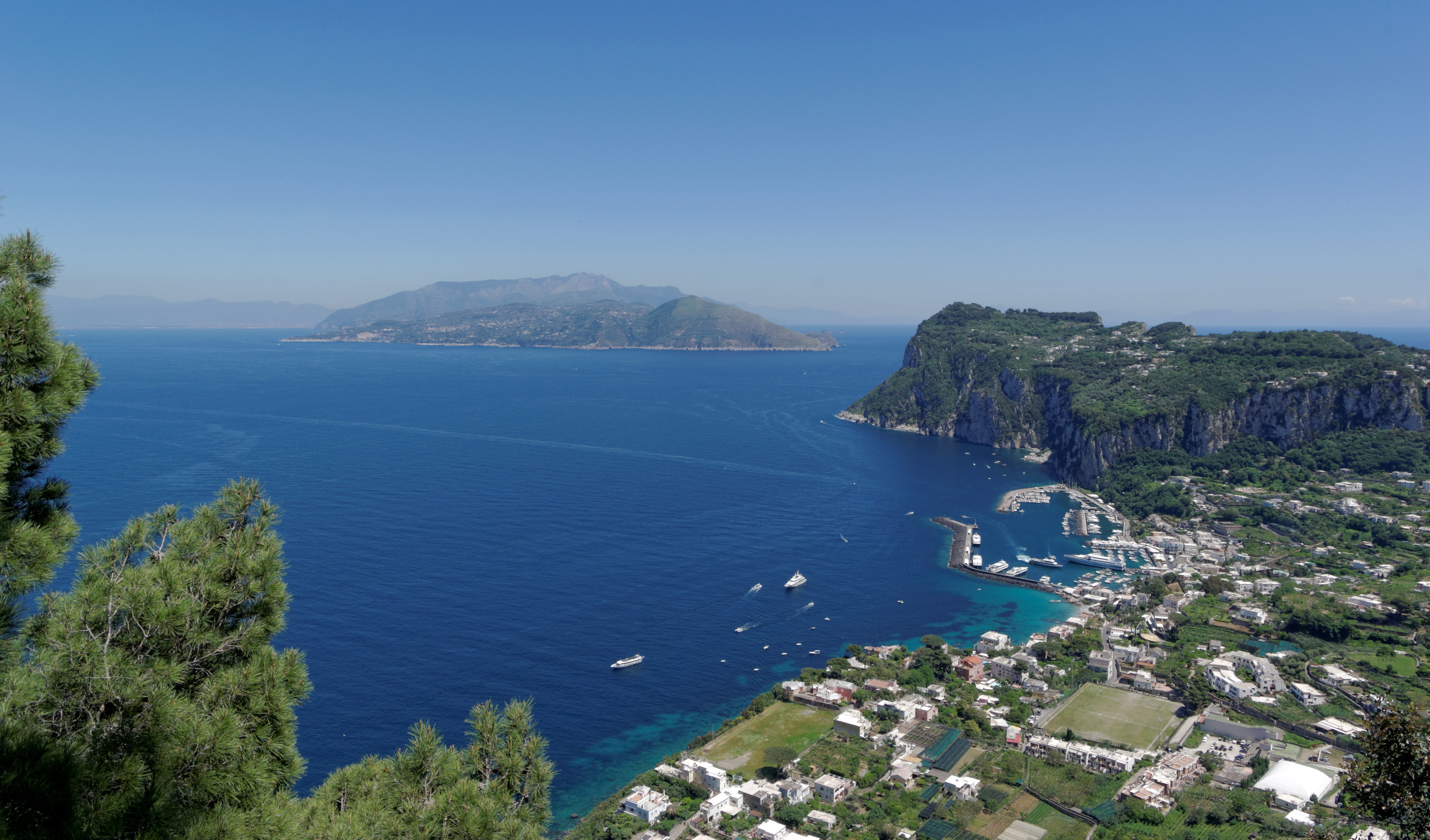
View of Marina Grande from Anacapri

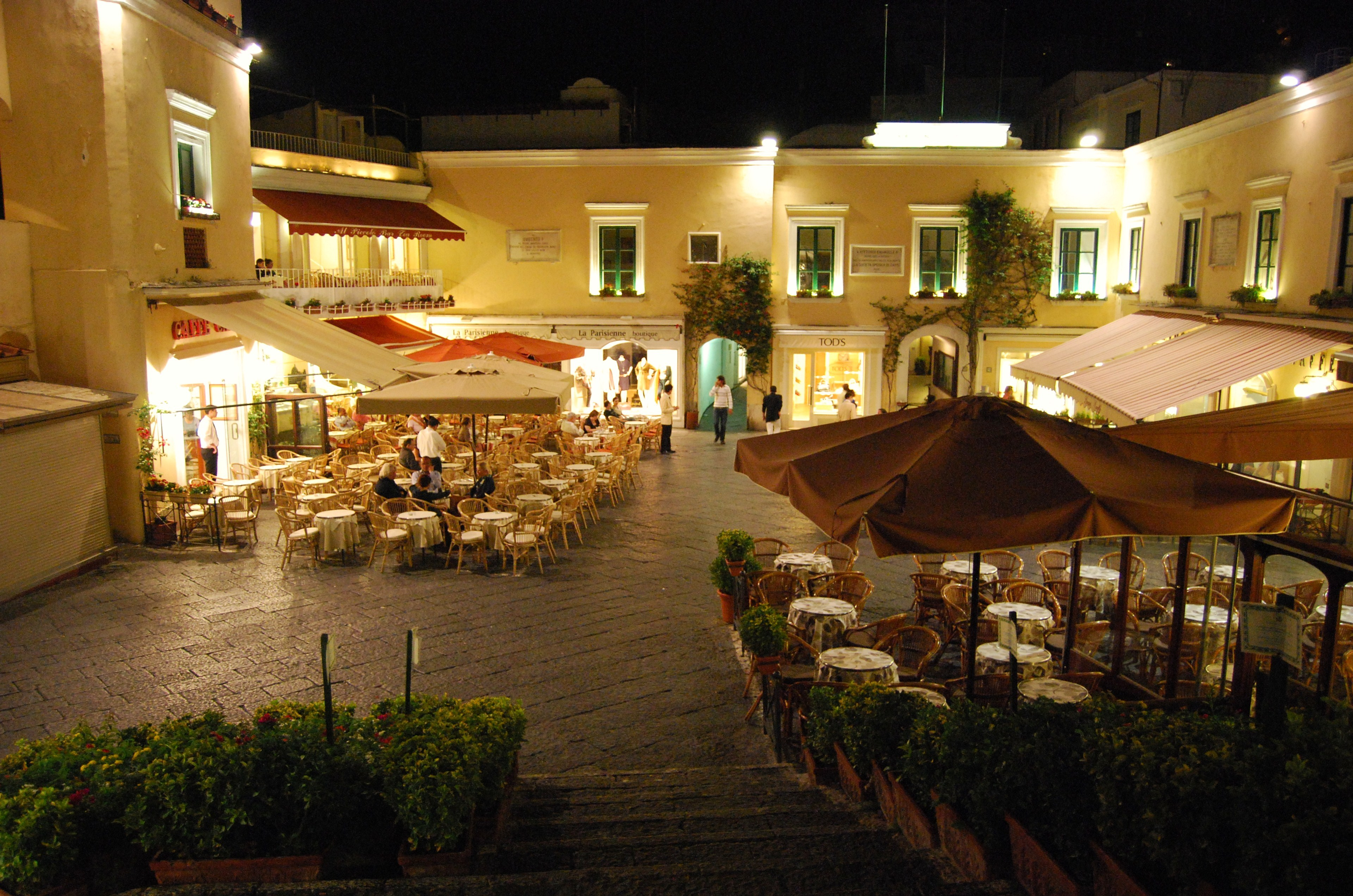
La Piazzetta

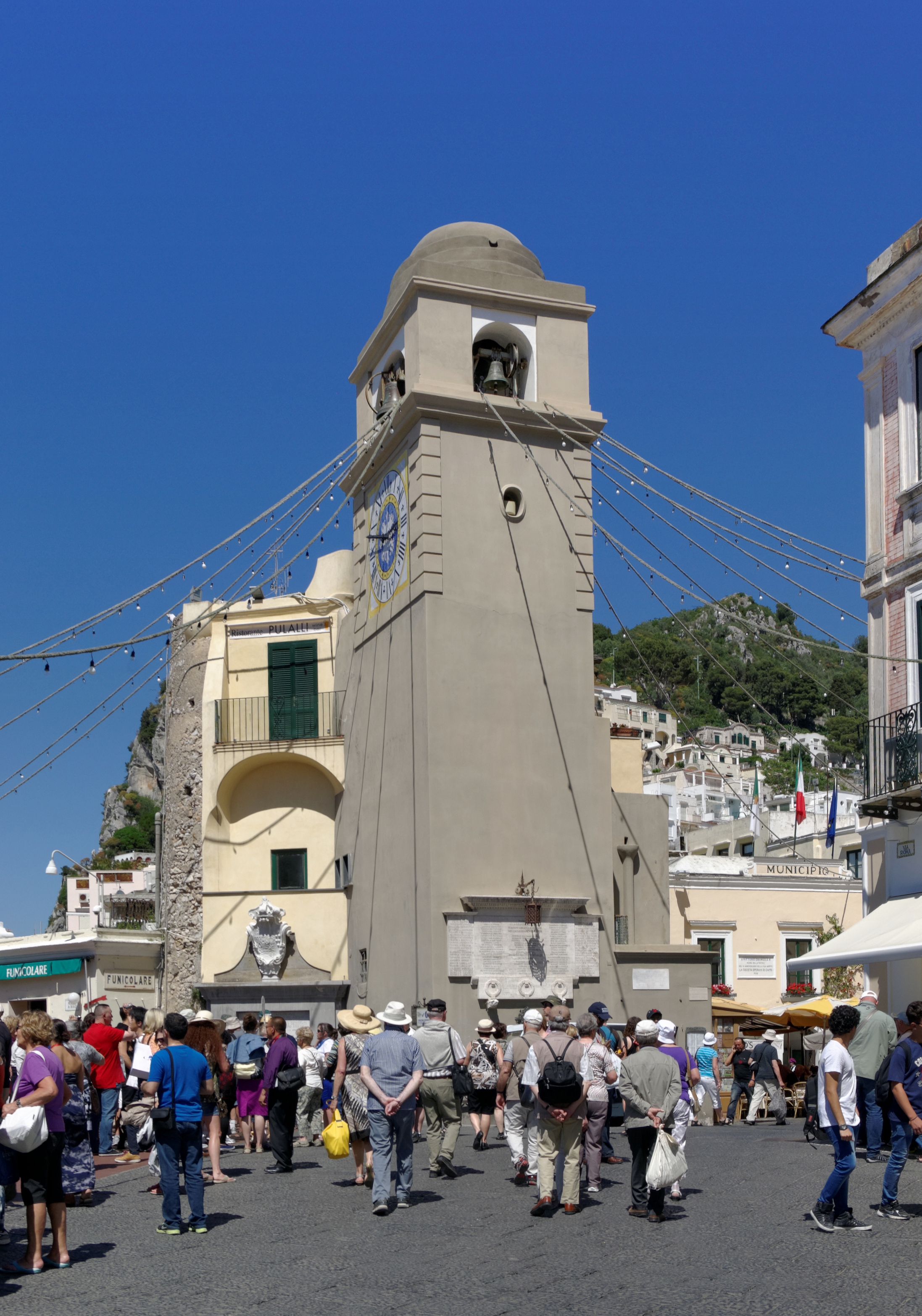
Clock tower at the Piazzetta

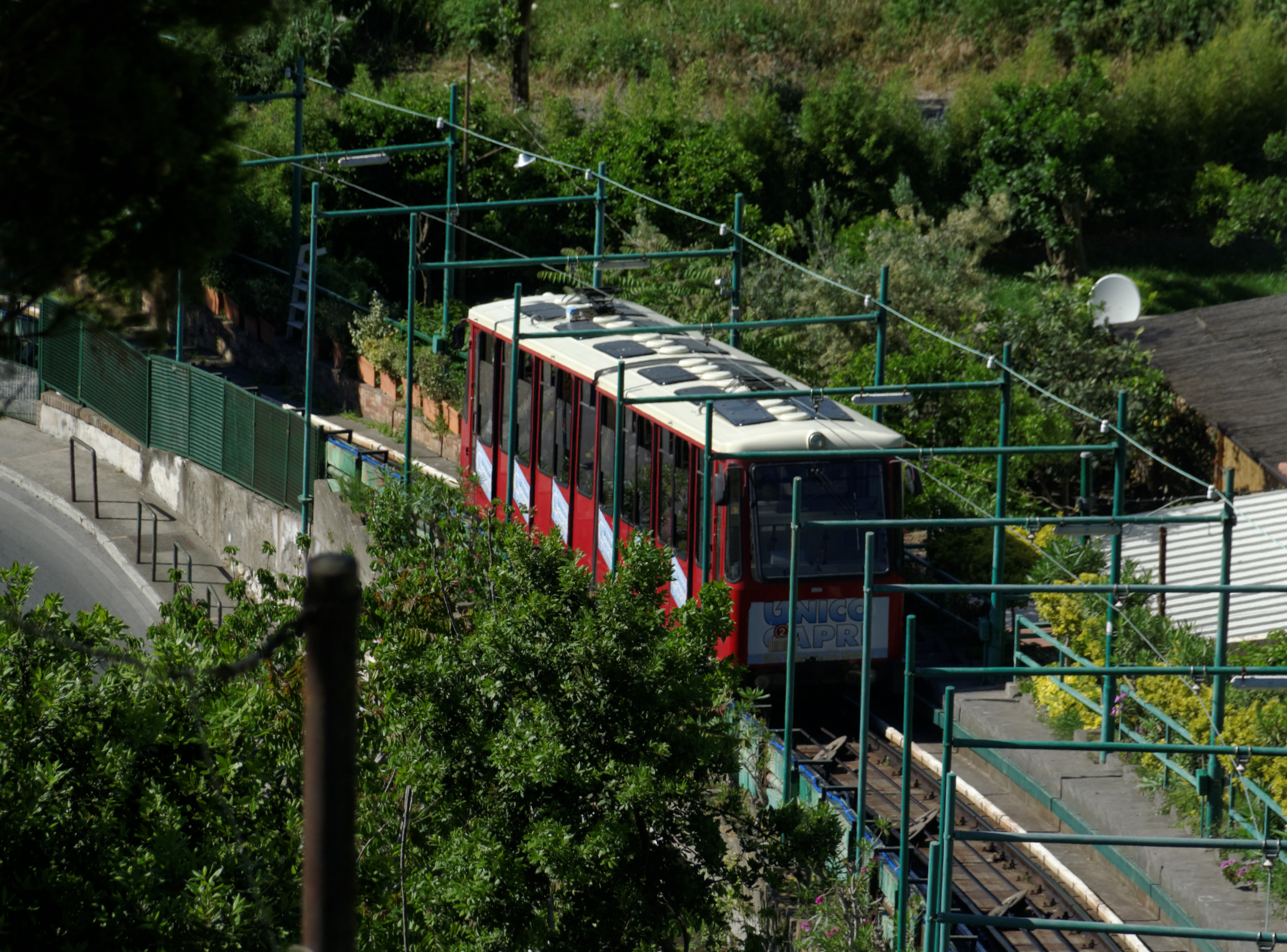
Funicular to Capri town

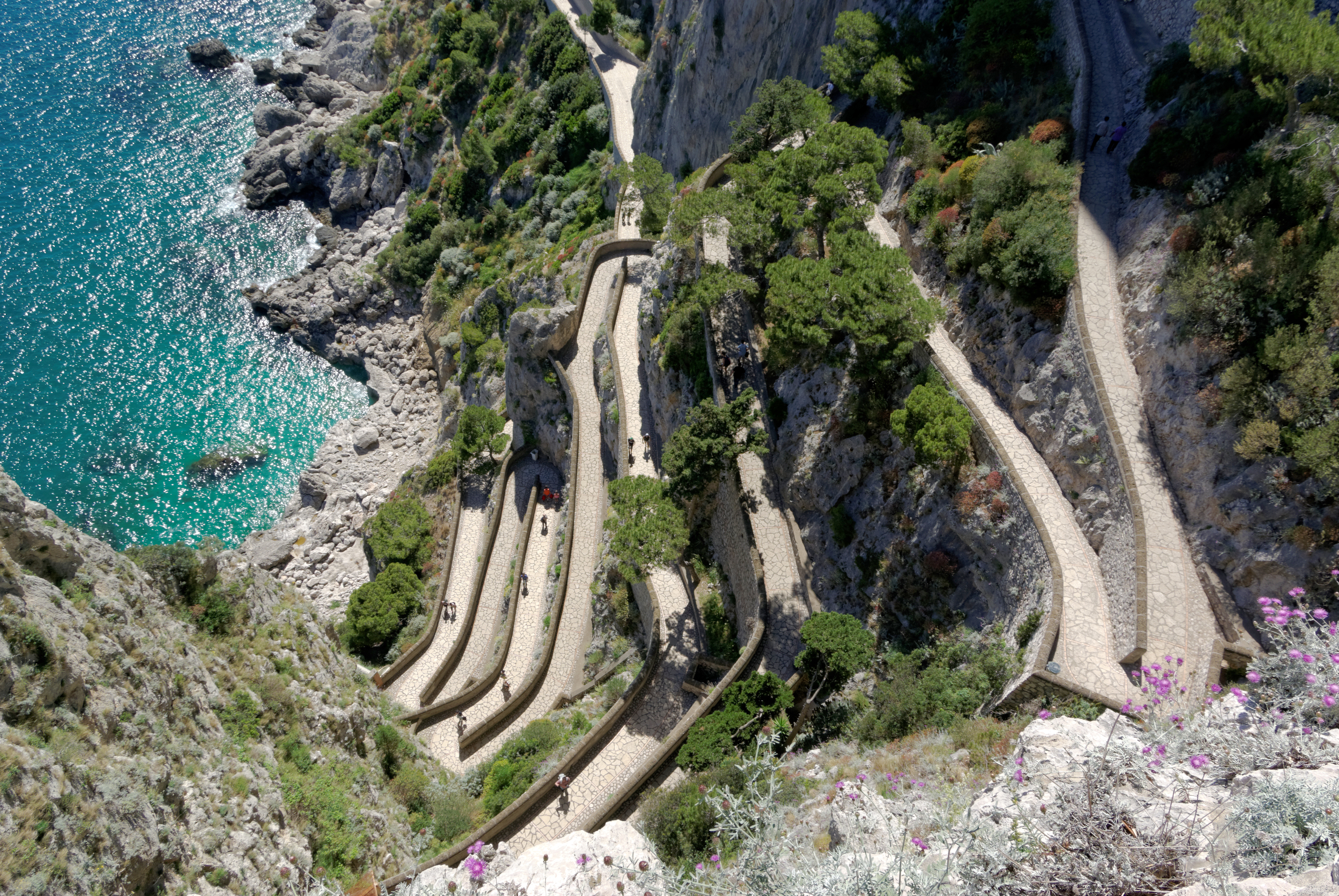
Via Krupp

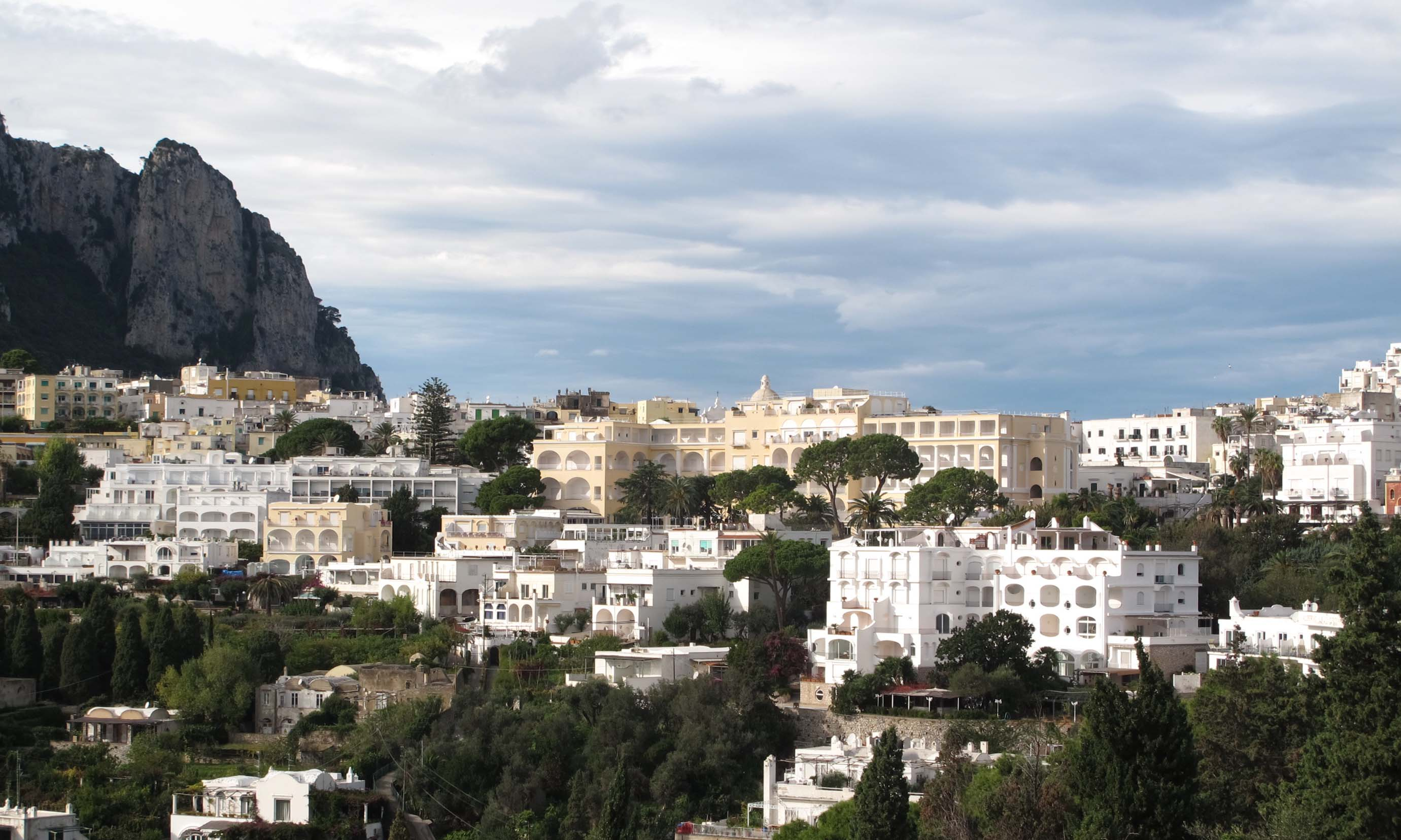
Capri

== See also ==
- Via Camerelle
