= Via Camerelle =

Street in Capri, Italy

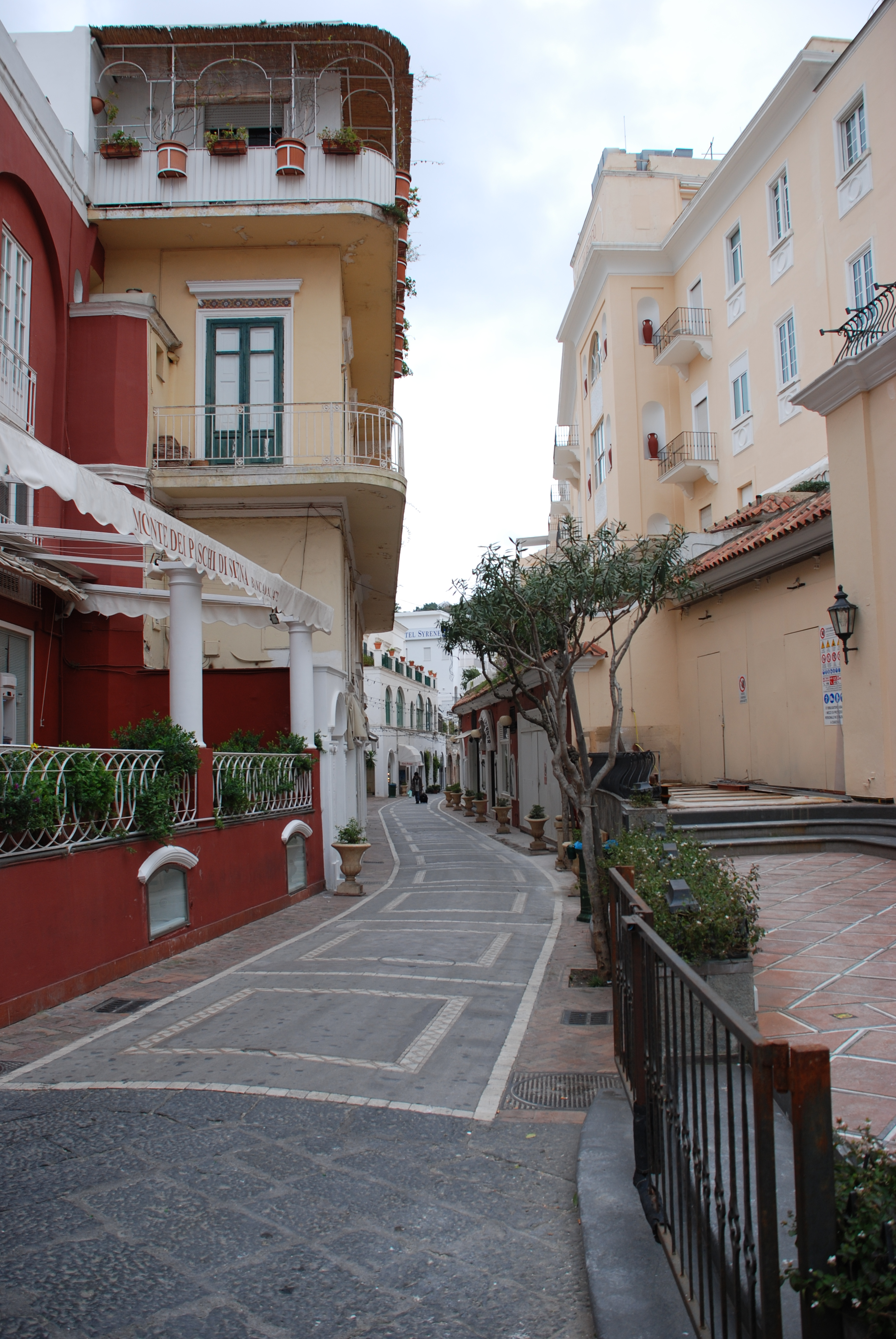
- The beginning of Via Camerelle
- Previous names: Via Anticaglia
- Country: Italy
- City: Capri
- Postal code: 80073
- Type: Pedestrian area
- Length: 273 m
- Naming: The camerelle, ancient Roman cisterns, some still present on the street
- Beginning: Via Vittorio Emanuele III, via Federico Serena
- End: Via Tragara
- Intersections: Via Vittorio Emanuele III, via Tragara, via Ignazio Cerio, via Occhio Marino, via Li Campi, via Federico Serena

Via Camerelle is a street in Capri, Campania, known for being the island's major commercial street.

Formerly known as Via Anticaglia, along its route stand the ruins of forty cisterns that served as the base and terracing for the road designed by the Romans that connected the Castiglione to the imperial villa of Tragara.

The name of the street, which starts from the square of the Grand Hotel Quisisana and proceeds straight to the beginning of Via Tragara, has an uncertain origin: there are numerous theories that justify this toponym.

== Toponymy ==
In ancient times, the street was known as via Anticaglia; the term 'Anticaglia' probably refers to the ruins of the forty Roman cisterns that ran along the route of the street.

This name fell into disuse in the 18th century, when the street began to be referred to as Via Camerelle. Although some hypotheses claim that this name referred to a stony path at the foot of Mount Tuoro, the most widely accepted theory states that this name designates the numerous cisterns built along the route of the street in Roman times.

== History ==
[...] Let the interior of this street serve as a receptacle for water, as is evidently known from the nature of the plaster, which we still see being used in other buildings and other similar constructions of roads in the Island itself.

— Rosario Mangoni

The street, built in Roman times, rested on some forty mighty arches, the bricks of which can still be seen today, neatly arranged next to each other. These mighty arches, closed on one side by the profile of the mountain, formed closed spaces on three sides, the so-called 'camarelle' or 'camerelle'.

Numerous conjectures have been made about the function of these structures. In addition to the hypothesis that they had been a circus or an amphitheatre, which is now believed to be untrue, the opinion has been consolidated that these rooms were formerly used as cisterns. This theory is corroborated both by the discovery of numerous lead pipes and conduits in the area of the structure of the rooms, in the classic barrel shape, typical of cisterns.

As already mentioned, Via Camerelle was built with the intention of connecting the centre of the island with the imperial villa of Tragara, which stood on the belvedere of the same name. Although it played an important role, in imperial times the street was very narrow, poorly maintained and cluttered with bushes, stones and brambles. Suetonius narrates in his work The Twelve Caesars:

On one trip, as Tiberius' litter had become entangled in brambles, he knocked down and nearly clubbed to death the centurion of the first courts who was in charge of scouting the route.

In the Middle Ages, the cisterns were opened on the road frontage and used as various storerooms, in which beasts of burden or draught animals were placed.

The road was studied in the early 18th century. In the 18th century, a century considered to be transgressive and libertine, some research took place that led to the theory that prostitution was practised in the rooms on which the street rested. The camerelle were confused with the so-called "sellariae", which Suetonius cited as rooms decorated with pornographic images where the emperor spent time watching erotic games. This theory, however, was never popular among scholars of the time as Suetonius does not mention the exact location of the sellariae and their identification in the camerelles was never reliably confirmed.

A second theory was also formulated in the same century, which, as already mentioned, saw in those rooms closed on three sides cisterns to collect water, a commodity in Roman times highly sought after on the island, and to run pipes.

Via Camerelle first changed its appearance in the second half of the 19th century. On what Edwin Cerio described as a 'dirt road', the Villa Pompeiana was built in 1879, designed by the German Adolf Kottgen. This dwelling, built on one of the Tiberian cisterns, has a U-shaped profile with a quadrangular patio between two porticoed wings; it is so called because of its features that recall a typical Roman house.

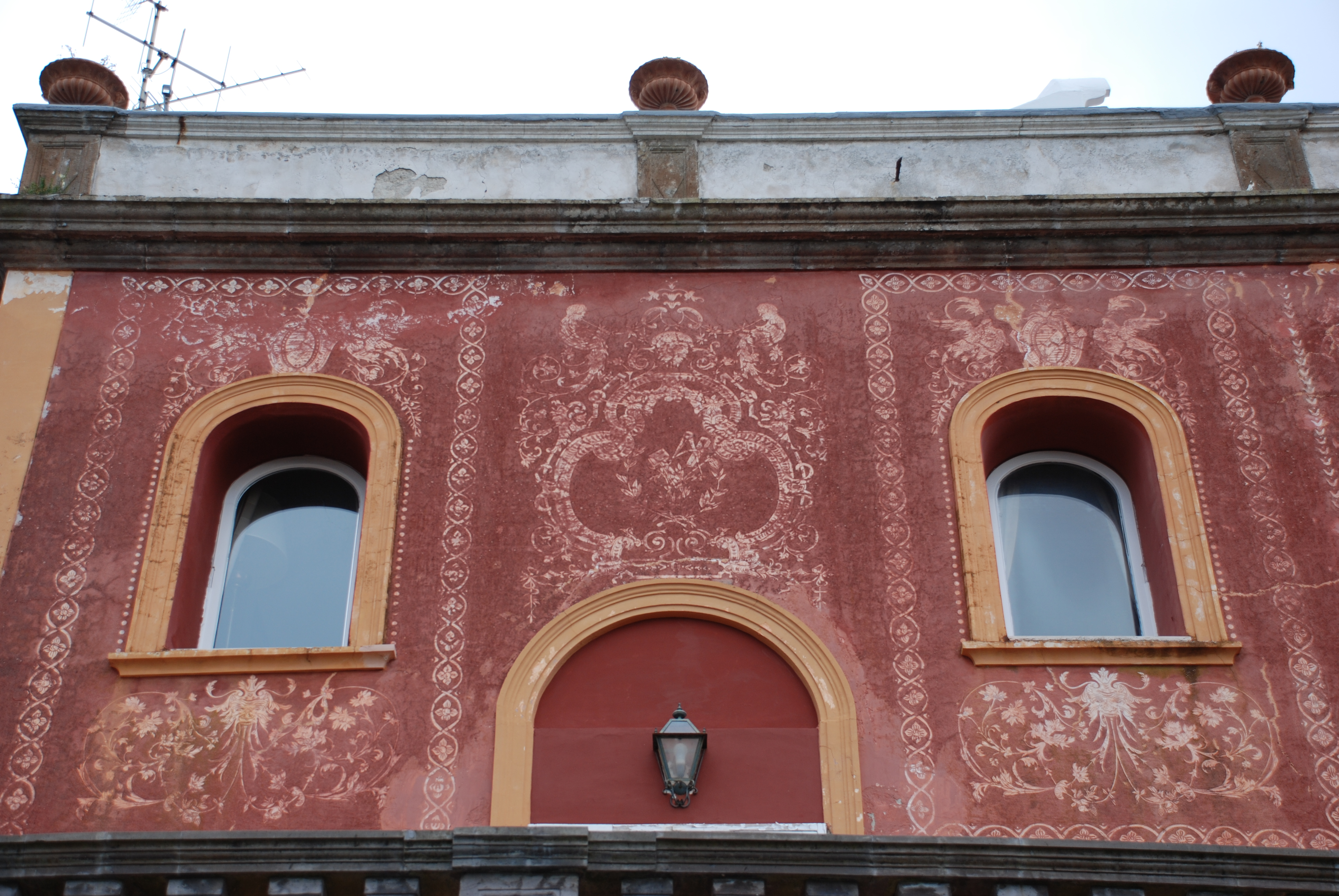
Villa Pompeiana, built to a design by Adolf Kottgen.

Another villa that was built along the route of the street is Villa Jenny, built in 1902 by Giorgio Cerio, who dedicated it to his wife. The villa features a loggia surrounded by numerous columns and a portico paved with polychrome marble of Roman origin.

Via Camerelle remained detached from Capri's frenetic life until the early 20th century, during which the street became bustling with the thousands of tourists who visited the island in the early 20th century. During this period, which can be designated as the "first golden phase" of the street, the well-known Quisisana hotel, whose kitchens overlook the beginning of the street, was inaugurated, and numerous small craft stores were opened; in addition, the large uncultivated space present along the end section of the street, which extended about 2,000 m^{2}, was converted into a lush exotic garden.

The street experienced its "second golden phase" in the 1940s during which the Anglo-Americans, having landed on Capri, fixed their headquarters in some suites of the Quisisana Hotel. The Allies, who had come to the island to "forget the horrors of the war" and to "spend the long-awaited one-week premium leave," devoting themselves to pure enjoyment had numerous stores opened, which would sell them souvenirs or other items. Thanks to them, the Chantecler jewelry store opened in 1943, run by Neapolitan Pietro Capuano, which for about twenty years constituted the only luxury store on the street.

In the 1950s, the island, having accentuated its frivolous and worldly characteristics, became a favored destination for mass tourism; as a result, Via Camerelle became increasingly linked to the big fashion brands, which opened numerous luxury stores there, still present today.

== Route ==
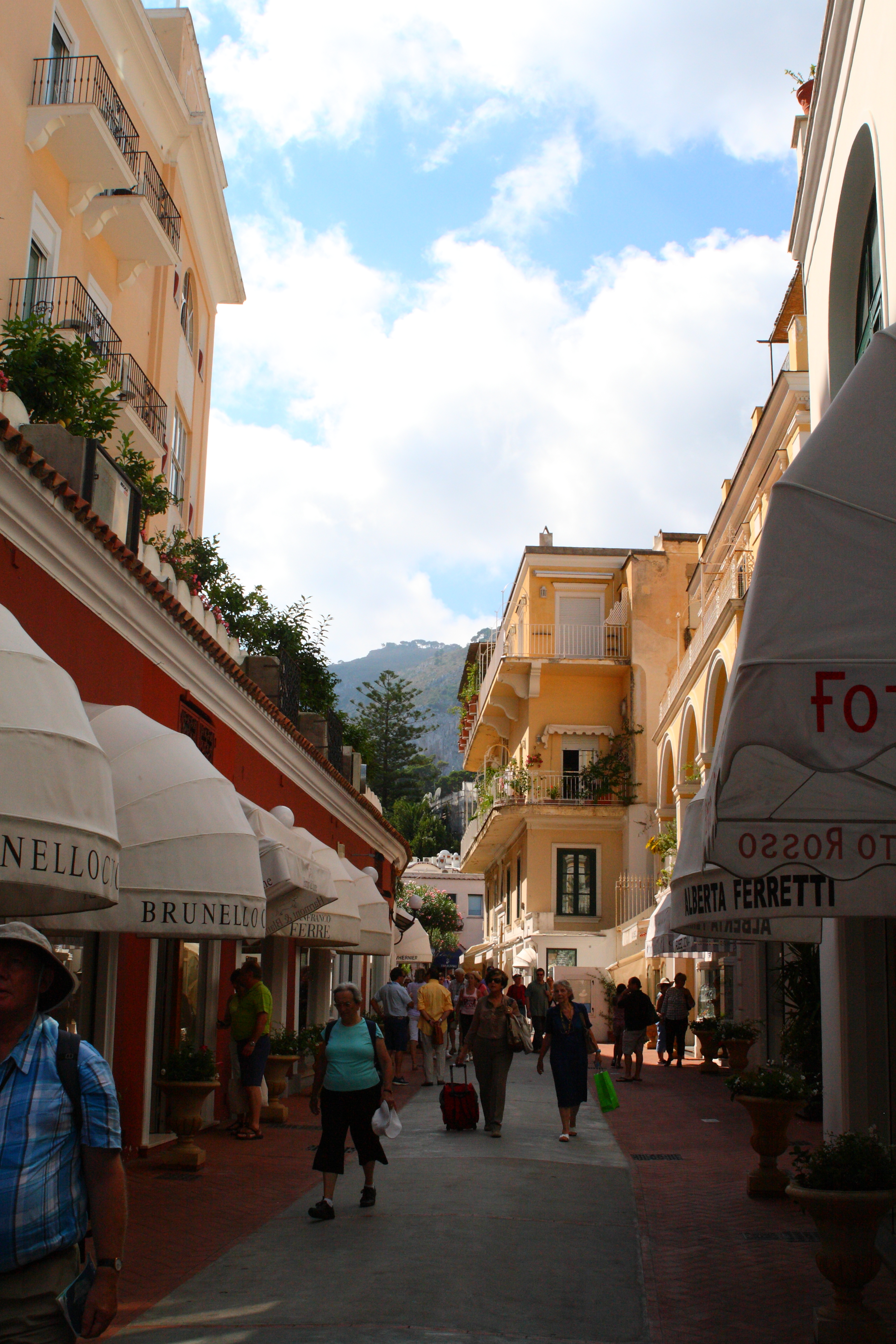
The second section of Camerelle Street.

The modern street course of Via Camerelle connects the town of central Capri, starting from the Quisisana Hotel, to the beginning of Via Tragara and Via Occhio Marino, both of which lead to the southeastern part of the island.

The street, 273 meters long, follows a mostly straight path that can be divided into several sections. The first section includes the entire esplanade overlooked by the Quisisana hotel and is often known simply as the "Quisisana esplanade." The second section, on the other hand, includes the entire stretch between the Quisisana and the beginning of Ignazio Cerio Street. This portion, which includes the beginning of the arches on which the street rests, comprises the majority of the street's boutiques. Finally, the third and final section is enclosed between the Villa Pompeiana and the end of the street. This section, of moderate archaeological importance, includes mostly restaurants and clothing stores.

== Archaeology ==
Camerelle Street is of considerable archaeological importance; however, the few surviving structures are incorporated into the store fronts on the upper side of the street.

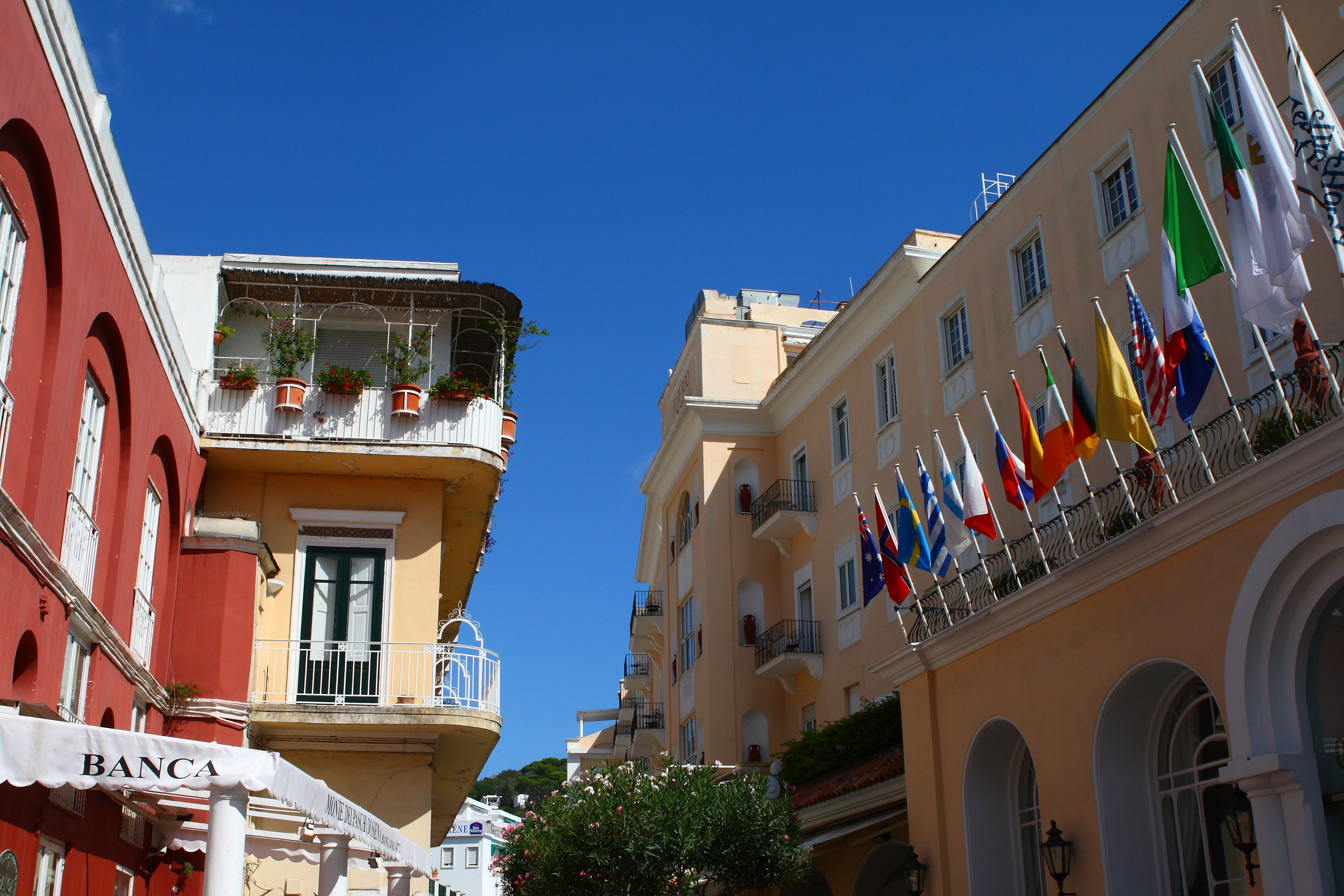
Grand Hotel Quisisana.

=== Piazzola del Quisisana (first section) ===
Originally "at the Quisisana hotel" there were "shapeless parts of ancient masonry" brought to light in 1928 while public works were underway for the construction of "sewer caverns." The structures (which were destroyed, as they were deemed to be of "no importance") are mentioned only in very few archival records, as no further data have been found on their exact location.

Further excavations in the square would unearth additional finds: in 1935 "in the soil adjacent to the small square of the Quisisana" "rough walls in opus incertum" were found while work was being done to build a residential building.

=== Second section ===
At three meters of the footing side, on the northern side of the street, short sections of an east–west oriented wall with brickwork facing remained.

It is also recalled that, in 1952, a wall was found "in opus incertum, with opus signinum plaster underneath," of which there are now only bibliographic records.

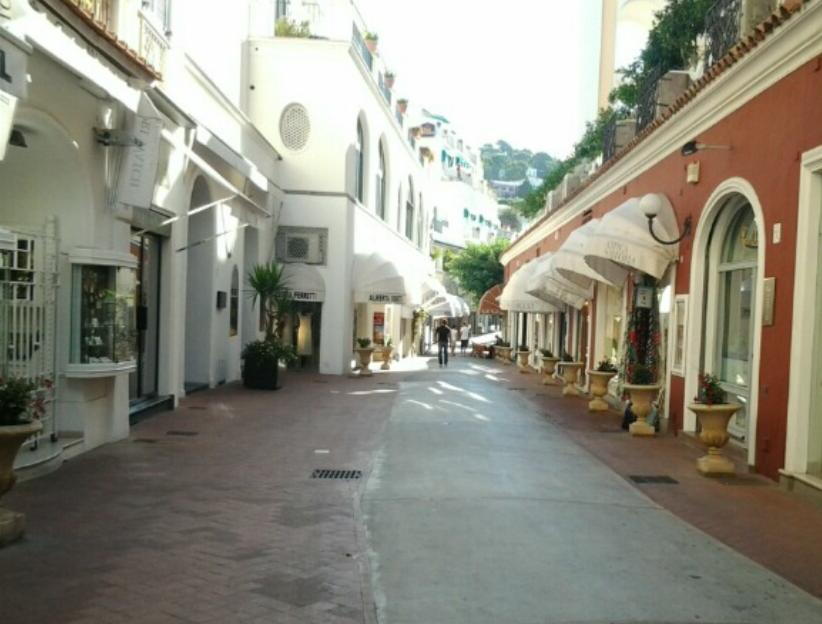
The second section of Camerelle Street.

In the vicinity of the Pompeian villa there are also other finds: in addition to a brickwork wall (visible just ahead of the dwelling), the ruins of a wall orthogonal to the street oriented in a north–south direction are preserved in the southeastern corner of the street. The only surviving element of the structure is the core, incorporated into the modern wall (from which it protrudes out) and made of limestone with pozzolana mortar and lime.

=== Third section ===
After the Villa Pompeiana (more precisely, at the entrance to number 71A) the core of the arched wall structure, which supported the ancient road, and a short section of wall, slightly projecting and oriented in a north–south direction, are preserved.

In section it is also possible to see a layer of plaster, which cuts lengthwise through the structure, to which it is pertinent in its western part. Not far from the latter is the core of a short section of wall, oriented in a north–south direction and included in the modern facade of the street.

Finally, at the end of Camerelle Street there is a portion of the wall, oriented in an east–west direction, two meters long and incorporated into the retaining wall of the natural terrace of the street.

== See also ==
- Capri
- Piazza Umberto I
- Via Krupp
- Via Vittorio Emanuele III
- Phoenician Steps

== Bibliography ==
- Borà, Salvatore (1992). I nomi di Capri. Origine e storia di strade, corti e dintorni. La Conchiglia.
- Borà, Salvatore (2002). Itinerari storici e monumentali di Capri ed Anacapri. la Conchiglia.
- De Angelis Bertolotti, Romana (1990). Capri. La natura e la storia. Zanichelli.
- Federico, Eduardo; Miranda, Elena (1998). Capri antica: dalla preistoria alla fine dell'età romana. La Conchiglia.
- Mangoni, Rosario (1834). Ricerche topografiche ed archeologiche sull'isola di Capri. G. Palma.
