= Faraglioni di Capri =

Rocky islands in the Gulf of Naples, near Capri, Italy

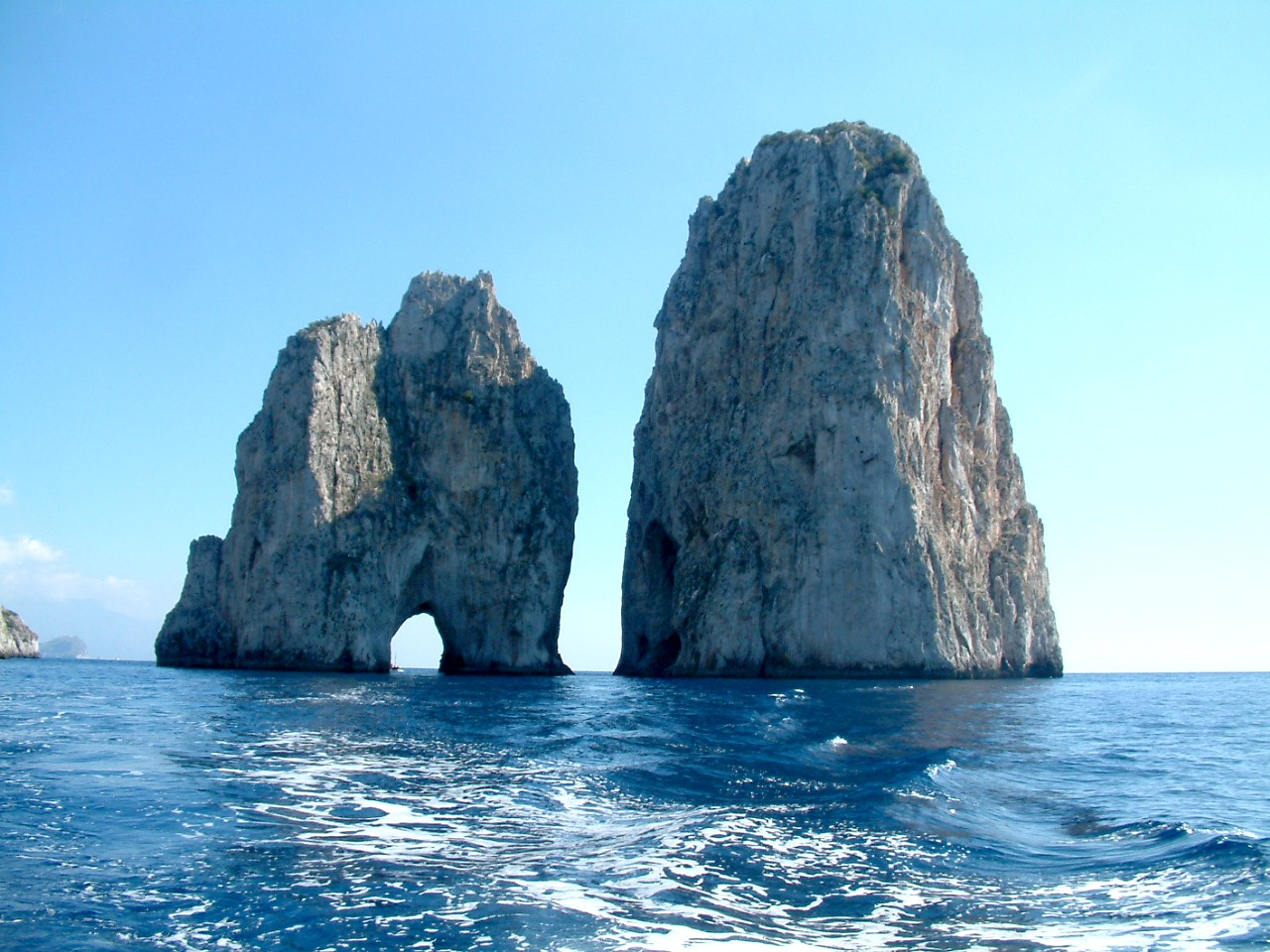

- Location within Italy

Geography
- Location: Tyrrhenian Sea
- Coordinates: 40.540121°N 14.252961°E
- Highest elevation: 109 m (358 ft)

Administration
- Italy
- Region: Campania
- Metropolitan City: Naples
- Comune: Capri

Demographics
- Population: 0

The faraglioni di Capri (Neapolitan: faragliune 'e Capri) are three small rocky faraglioni in the Gulf of Naples, off the island of Capri. Their notable shapes result from erosion due to wind, rain, and sea waves.

== Overview ==
Part of the Campanian Archipelago, they are named:

- Stella, connected to the island; 109 metres (358 ft) high.
- Mezzo; 82 metres (269 ft) high, with a characteristic hole which resembles an arch.
- Scopolo (or Fuori); 106 metres (348 ft) high. The blue lizard or lucertola azzurra (Podarcis siculus coeruleus) is endemic to this faraglione.

Their short distance from the shore create a scenic effect. They are world-famous and can be watched from the sea, or from several viewpoints, such as Via Krupp, Villa Monacone or the Gardens of Augustus.

With the advent of tourism in the 19th and 20th centuries, the faraglioni rose to the status of "natural monuments", as well as the island's most iconic symbols. They were immortalized in numerous paintings by Josef Rebell, Johan Christian Dahl, Albert Bierstadt, Karl Wilhelm Diefenbach, William Stanley Haseltine, and others.

With the advent of chronophotography, Étienne-Jules Marey recorded a short footage of the faraglioni titled Vague, baie de Naples. Later, with the development of cinema and the media, they were featured in several films, among which the most famous are The Emperor of Capri with Totò (1949) and Il secondo tragico Fantozzi with Paolo Villaggio.

== Bibliography ==
- De Angelis Bertolotti, Romana (July 1990). Capri. La natura e la storia (in Italian). Zanichelli. ISBN 88-08-09123-6.
- Pier Andrea De Rosa, Giovanni Schettino (2008). Pittori e dintorni a Capri (in Italian). Wendalina Editrice. p. 149. ISBN 978-88-903769-0-0.
