= Santo Stefano, Capri =

Church building in Capri, Italy

Coordinates: 40°33′1″N 14°14′35″E

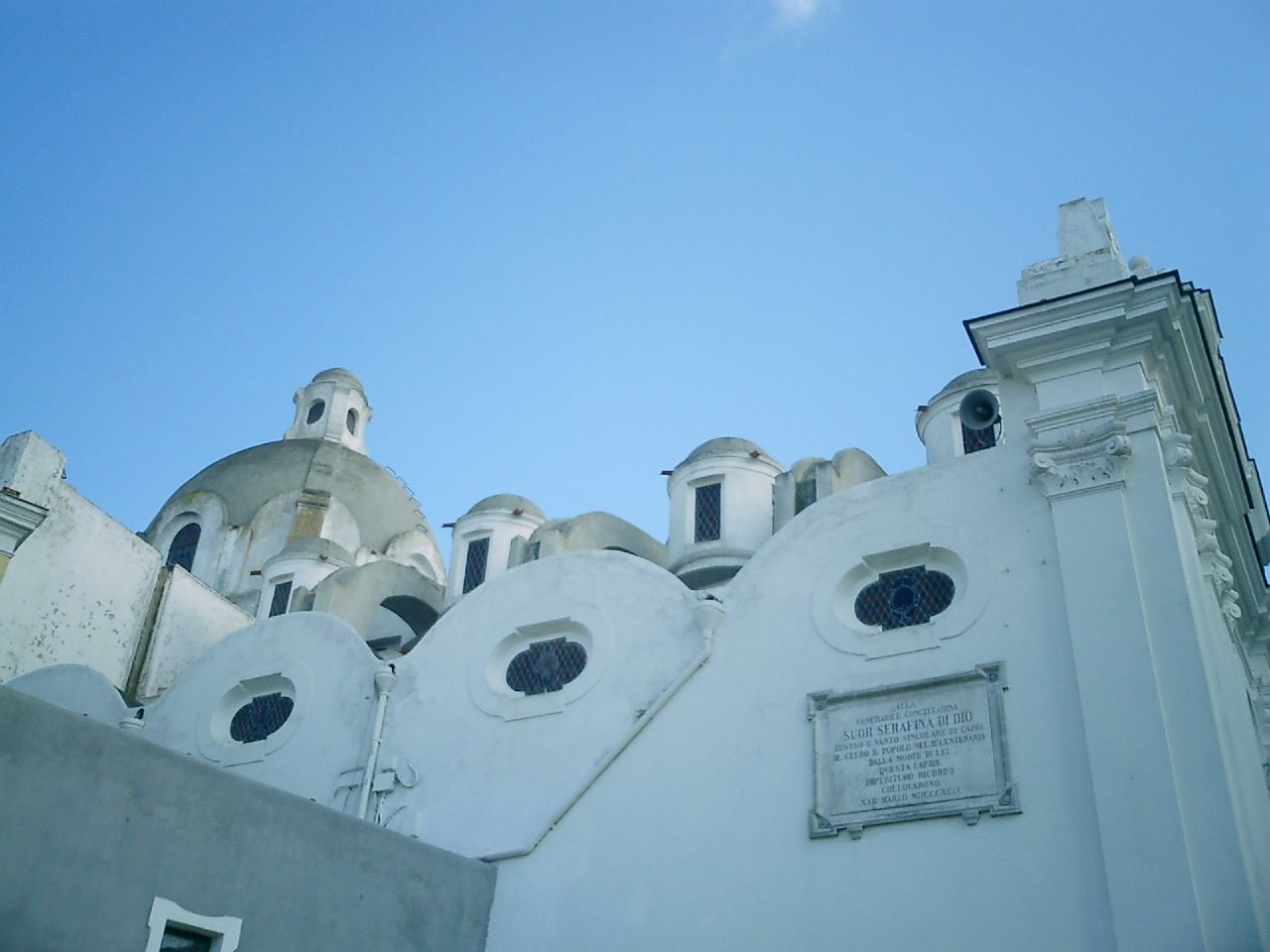
Church of Santo Stefano

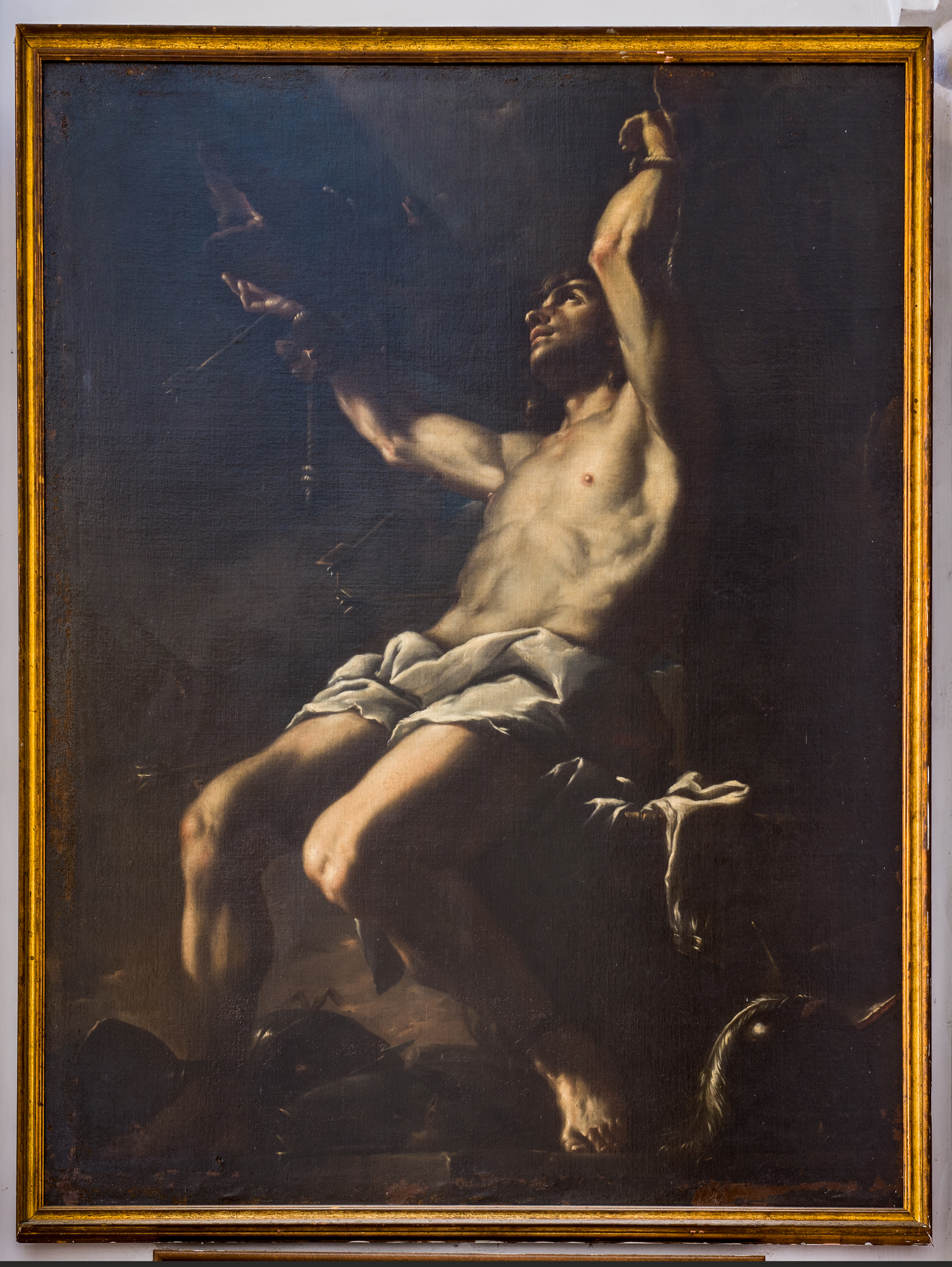
Painting of Saint Sebastian in the Santo Stefano church.

Santo Stefano is a Catholic church and former cathedral on the island of Capri, Italy. Dedicated to Saint Stephen, it is the principal house of worship in the town of Capri. The religious complex was built around the Piazza Umberto I square in the seventeenth century. The archbishop's palace is now used as the town hall ("Municipio"). Santo Stefano and Chiesa di San Costanzo are the island's two oldest churches.
