= Helmet of Fieramosca =

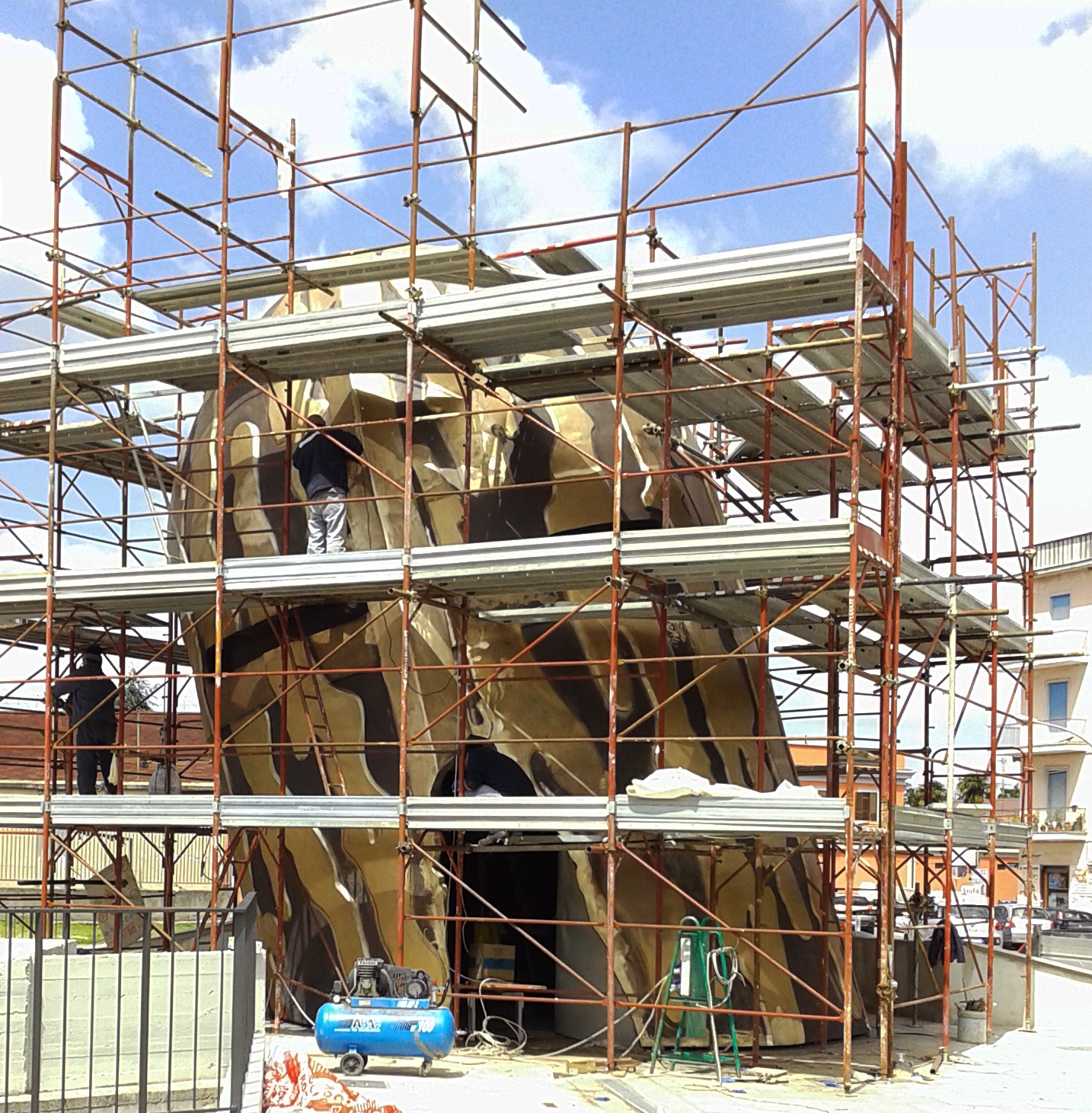
FIERAMOSCA info-point monument fase di montaggio anno 2016

Helmet of Fieramosca (it:l’Elmo di Fieramosca) is the monumental work in bronze created by the sculptor and painter Arturo Casanova for the city of Capua and installed in Piazza Umberto I.

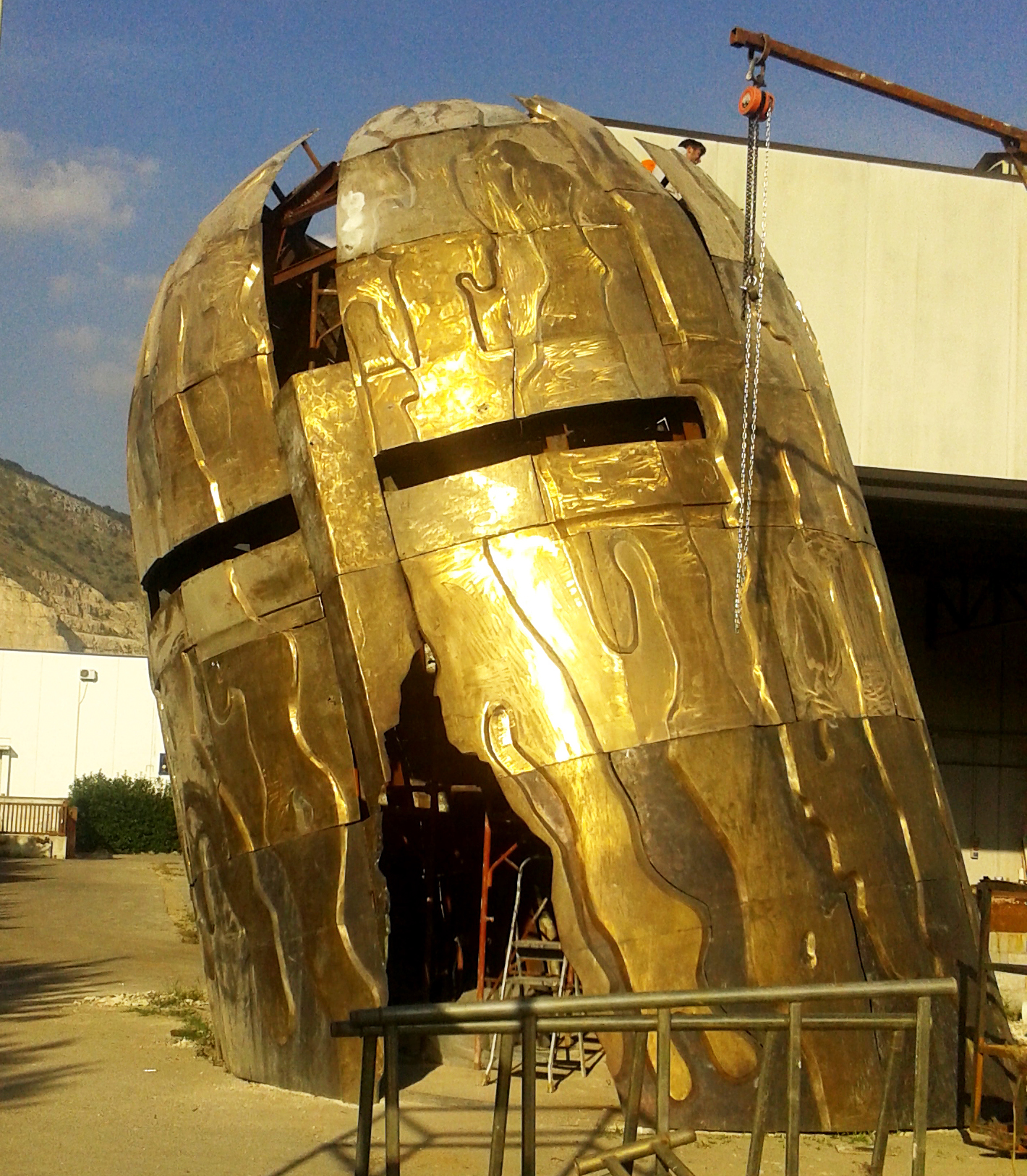
FIERAMOSCA info-point monument Fase di montaggio Anno 2016

The work is a massive helmet made of bronze and steel, notable for its striking 16° tilt relative to its base. It is composed of approximately 150 welded bronze plates and measures 9 meters in height, 6 meters in diameter, and weighs around 15 tons.

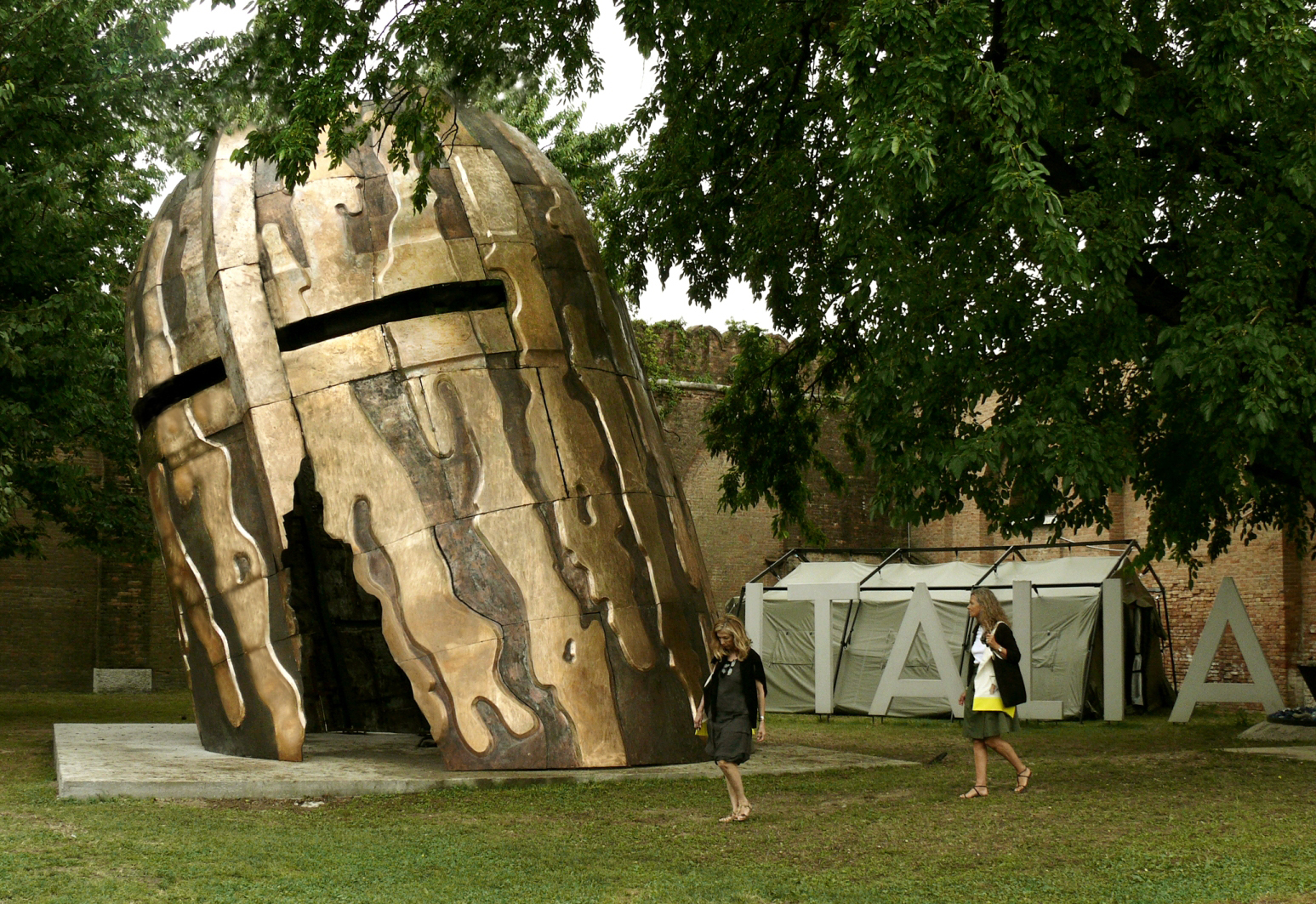
54 Biennale di Venezia 2011

Before its installation in Capua, the helmet was exhibited at the 54th Venice Biennale in 2011, as part of the Italy Pavilion (Padiglione Italia), curated by Vittorio Sgarbi.

== History ==
Designed by the artist as a functional sculpture, the monumental work is opened, therefore, the architecture used to be inhabited and lived, making it the largest facility dedicated to the leader capuano Ettore Fieramosca. It has a height of nine meters, a diameter of six and a weight of 15 tons and will be the place of reception. The helmet itself as a kind of urban-scale structure, the only example in Italy. But Fieramosca Infopoint Monument is also and above all a monumental work in a new context, which is the architectural and urban Cosmo16, a multipurpose space to serve the city and the travelers. Piazza Umberto I becomes an area of services capable of hosting a multi-story car park, from its position and the geometry of space, to serve as a support of the complex knot of collective public activities, trade and services included in the walls of the nearby historic town. The vast space of about 6,000 square meters will house, therefore, a two-level underground parking for a total of about 250 cars.

== Critical aspect ==
As we know the Elmo has already been at the Venice Biennale in 2011, and already is part of the historical and international artistic heritage, and not only of Capua. And so the story is confronted with the contemporary in a very strong allowing everyone to get into this confrontation with contemporary art. Piazza Umberto I with Cosmo16 can certainly hold its own against the major European markets and around the world. " "This project - explained the architect Palmiero - was a real gamble, and in the end thanks to a series of structural tricks you managed to counterbalance the sloping sculpture to make it not just the monument of the square but one of its elements, as an integral part of the reports that it will be created. " And this reaffirms Antonio Piccolo: "This is an ambitious and innovative project. We young local entrepreneurs we believed until the end, we won the race and we managed to achieve it thanks to a real team game. Only in this way it was possible to overcome all the bureaucratic problems. We wanted to give confidence to the younger generation and this new initiative that includes the Elmo and Cosmo16, an open space to the city and for the city. " Finally Marcello Del Giudice stresses the key role of Fonderia Nolana Del Giudice, right by the right arm, which works by four generations with national and international artists. He adds: "This project for its complexity is not only a work of contemporary art, but represented a real challenge, a source of pride for us and for the city itself, considering the use of a very old technique, the technique in investment casting that gave birth in the past in important works such as the Riace Bronzes. A colossal work, therefore, for which realization is directed by the artist and a commitment by the entire team "needed.

== Bibliography ==
- Sgarbi, Vittorio (2011). L'Arte Non E'Cosa Nostra.
- Carmine Antropoli e jolanda Capriglione (curated) Capua le piazze dell'arte (e dintorni) Arturo Casanova L'Elmo di Fieramosca book ARTETETRA edition pg 90-115 ISBN 978-88-99443-16-0
