= Villa Monacone =

Coordinates: 40°32′42.15″N 14°15′7.62″E

The Villa Monacone is located on the island of Capri, Italy. Situated near Pizzolungo and the Faraglioni rocks, its name derives from its location, which faces the Faraglioni's Monacone rock formation. The architectural style is unusual for a Capri villa. Built into the mountain's rocky slope, the columns and cross vaults opening by the porch connects with interior rooms rather than with the kitchen, the more common layout for a Capri villa. The German novelist, Monika Mann, lived at Villa Monacone with her friend, Antonio Spadaro, from 1954 to 1986. The Romanian historian Mircea Eliade stayed at one time in an annex of the villa.

The Villa today comprises three independent units. On the upper floor - with a panoramic porch and a large vaulted room with a fireplace - the two flats once occupied by Monika Mann and Antonio Spadaro, now joined. On the ground floor, along Via Pizzolungo, a flat on one level with columns and cross vaults, which used to be connected to the upper floor by a flight of stairs, now removed. To the right is a building with terraces, which was added to the pre-existing villa in more recent times.
