= Gennaro Arcucci =

Count Gennaro Arcucci (died 1800) was an Italian physician, antiquarian and a hero of the island of Capri and Caprese martyr in the Bourbon Restoration of Ferdinand I. He was said to have been the principal signori of the island who used to "entertain the King during his visits to the island and offer him draughts of his far-famed 'Tears of Tiberius'". He was hanged by the Bourbons in 1800, "as a 'liberal'". A plaque commemorates him on the Piazza Umberto I.
