= Cimitero acattolico di Capri =

Protestant cemetery in Capri

Coordinates: 40°33′05″N 14°14′04″E

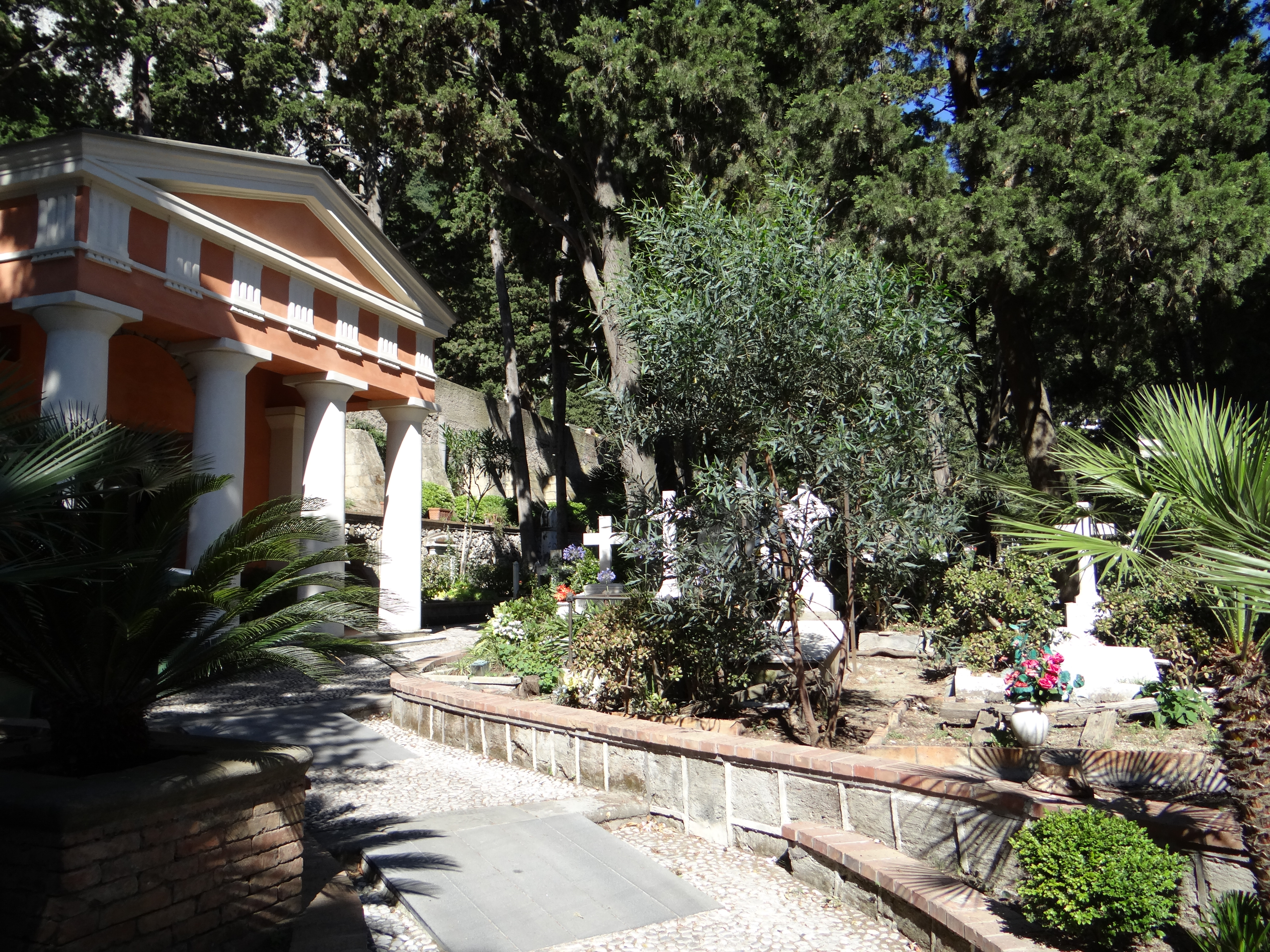
View from the entrance

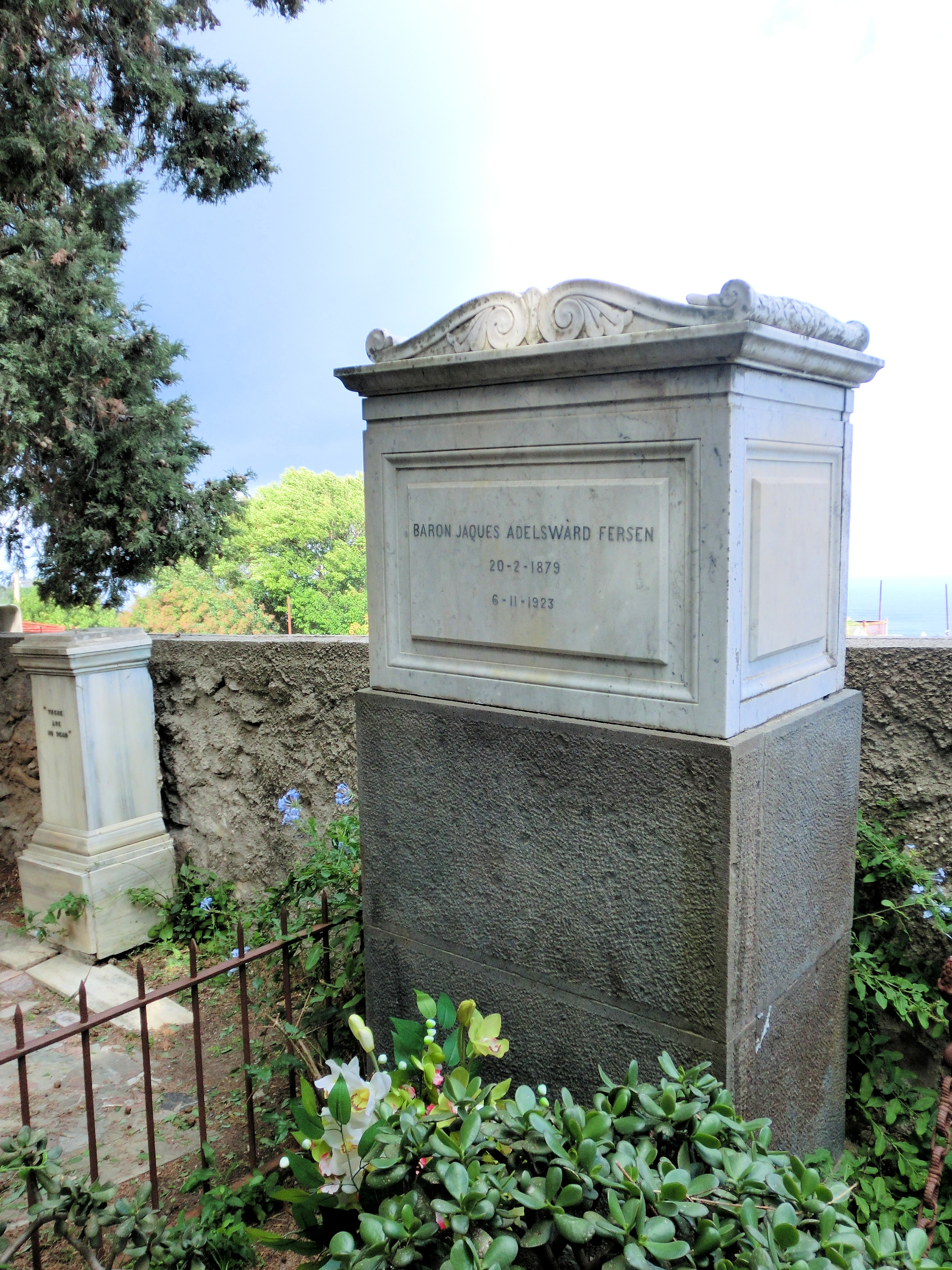
Tombstone of Jacques d'Adelsward-Fersen

Cimitero acattolico di Capri is a non-Catholic cemetery on the island of Capri. Established in 1878 by Englishman George Hayward, it contains 204 graves from a total of 21 different nations. Most of the people buried in the cemetery though are of English nationality, German, Russian or American. Aside from Protestants, also buried in the cemetery are Jews, Orthodox Christians and some Catholics. Notable interments include French Baron Jacques d'Adelsward-Fersen, Lucio Amelio, Günter Ammon, Gracie Fields, Norman Douglas and Jakob Johann von Uexküll.

After the Second World War, the cemetery saw a period of great neglect, which ended in 1986 when the municipality of Capri ensured the preservation and restoration of the cemetery graves.
