= Monika Mann =

German author and feature writer

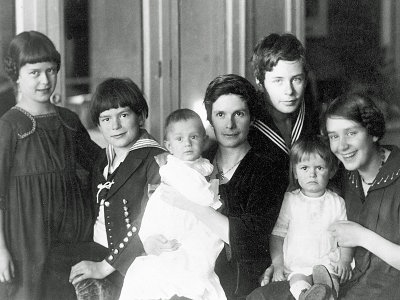
Monika Mann (first left) with her mother and siblings, 1919

Monika Mann (7 June 1910 – 17 March 1992) was a German American author and feature writer. She was born in Munich, Germany, the fourth of six children of the Nobel Prize–winning author Thomas Mann and Katia, née Katharina Pringsheim.

She trained as a pianist and her early attempts at a musical career seemed promising, but were not met with success and she instead pursued a career as a writer. She married in 1939 but lost her husband the following year, when the ship on which they were travelling to Canada was sunk by a German submarine. Later that year she joined her family in Princeton, New Jersey, and was granted US citizenship in 1952.

Between 1954 and 1986, she lived with her partner Antonio Spadaro in Villa Monacone on Capri. This was her most productive time as a writer and her books and several magazine articles were written during this period. After the death of her partner she left Capri and spent her last years until her death with her brother Golo's adopted family in Leverkusen, Germany.

== Family and early life ==
Thomas Mann was already well established as a novelist and short story writer at the time of Monika's birth, although his Nobel Prize came many years later. Her mother, born Katharina Hedwig Pringsheim, was the daughter of the German Jewish mathematician and artist Alfred Pringsheim and the actress Hedwig Pringsheim. Due to her being the granddaughter of Júlia da Silva Bruhns, she was also of Portuguese-Indigenous Brazilian partial descent.

Monika had an elder sister, Erika (1905–1969) and two elder brothers, Klaus (1906–1949) and "Golo" (1909–1994). A year after Monika's birth her mother was ill with a lung complaint and was one of the first patients to be admitted to the Wald Sanatorium in Davos, Switzerland. There was an interval of eight years before the birth of the last two children, a sister Elisabeth (1918–2002) and a brother Michael (1919–1977). Her uncle was the novelist Heinrich Mann.

She was not her parents' favourite. Her father confessed frankly in his diary that, of the six children, he preferred the two oldest, Klaus and Erika, and little Elisabeth. Her mother wrote in 1939 to Klaus that she was determined not to say any more unfriendly words about Monika and to be kind and helpful. In the family letters and chronicles she was often described as weird. ". . . after a three week stay here (in the parental home) she is still the same old dull quaint Mönle (her nickname in the family), pilfering from the larder . . .".

After boarding school at Schule Schloss Salem she trained as a pianist in Lausanne and spent her young years in Paris, Munich, Frankfurt and Berlin. In 1933 when Hitler came to power she emigrated with her parents to Sanary-sur-Mer in southeastern France. In 1934 she studied music and history of art in Florence, taking private piano tuition from the Italian composer Luigi Dallapiccola.

== Later career ==
In Florence she met the Hungarian art historian Jenő Lányi and in 1938 the couple left Italy for London, where they married on 2 March 1939. They left for Canada in 1940 on the SS City of Benares, carrying 90 child evacuees, their ten escorts, 91 paying passengers (including 10 children), and 215 crew. On 17 September the ship was sunk by a torpedo from the German submarine, U-48. The couple managed to climb into Lifeboat 6. As the lifeboat began to lower, the blocks slid out of place, and the stern end of the boat fell, flinging more than two thirds of the roughly sixty people into the sea. The couple fell into the water. Monika grabbed and clung on to a large piece of wood floating nearby. Jenő, however, drowned, and she heard him call to her three times before he went under. She floated around in the sea for several hours, before a lifeboat, the same Lifeboat 6 from which she had fallen, found her drifting in the sea. The lifeboat was heavily waterlogged and only 23 people were still in the lifeboat. Slowly, one by one, 15 of the occupants died. Mann was one of eight people who survived. Only one other woman, Letitia Quinton, in this lifeboat survived. The only child survivor was her son, Anthony Quinton. After 20 hours they were rescued by a British ship and taken to Scotland. Of the 406 people on board the Benares, only 148 had survived. Among the 258 people who had died, were 81 children out of 100. She reached New York on 28 October 1940 on the troopship Cameronia, and joined her parents, who had moved to the US in 1939, at the outbreak of World War II. For a while she lived with her parents, who showed little sympathy for her. Her traumatic loss of her husband and her attempts at a new beginning with them were ignored. Later she moved into her own apartment near her parents.

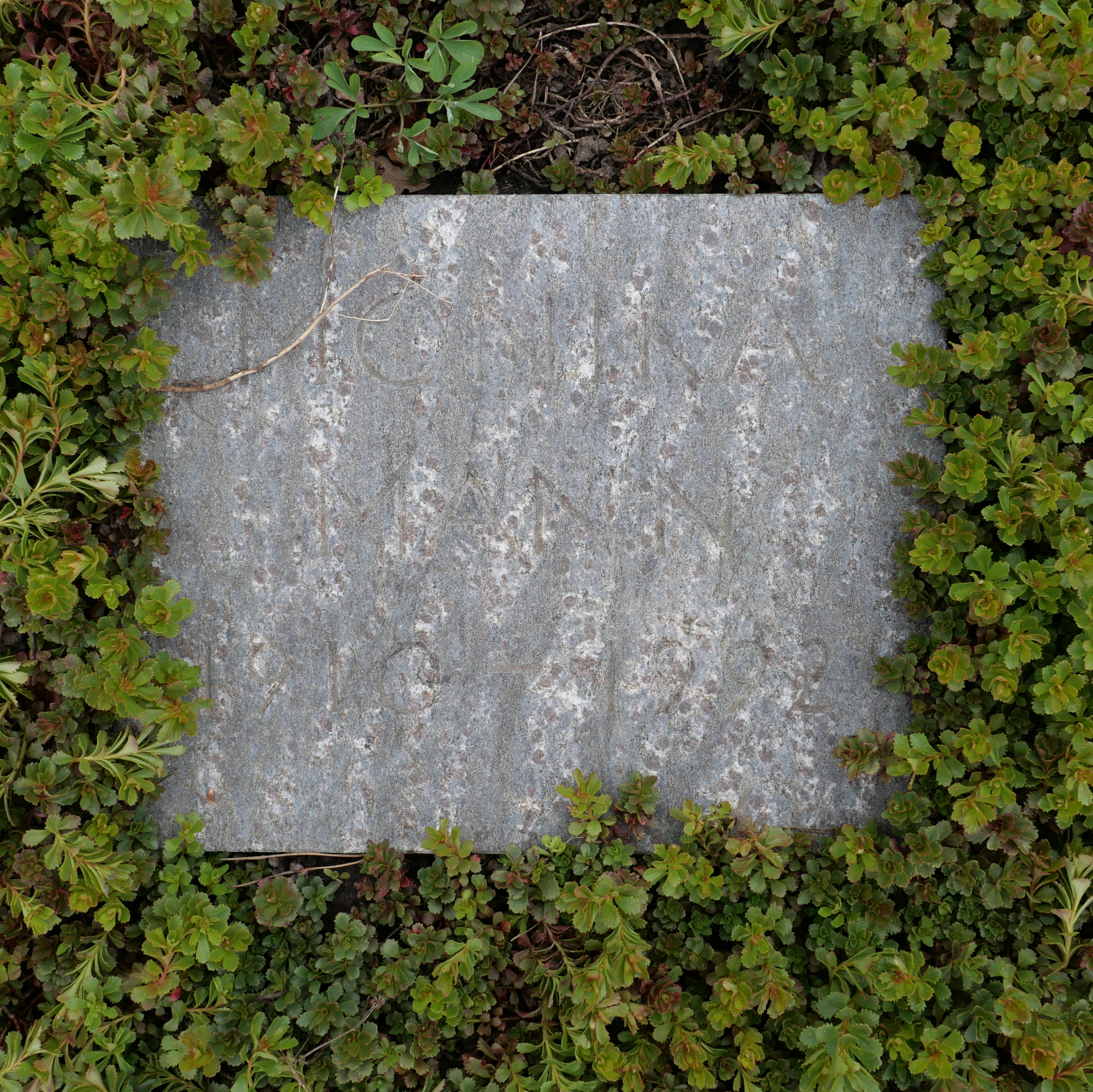
Monika Mann's grave.

From 1943 to 1952, with short breaks, she lived in New York. After attempts to renew her career as a pianist she turned to employment as a writer. In 1952 she was granted US citizenship, but she was already planning her return to Europe. In September she travelled with her sister Elizabeth's family to Italy. After a few months in Genoa, Bordighera and Rome she fulfilled her desire to live in a beautiful region by moving to Capri, where she lived in the Villa Monacone with her partner, Antonio Spadaro. In Capri she blossomed. During this period she wrote five books and contributed regular feature pages to Swiss, German and Italian newspapers and magazines. She remained in Capri for 32 years until the spring of 1986, a few months after the death of Spadaro in December 1985.

She was not able to realise her desire to live in Kilchberg, Zurich with her parents, who had returned to Europe. She spent her last years at Leverkusen, North Rhine-Westphalia, in the care of Ingrid Beck-Mann, the widow of her brother Golo's adopted son, and died on 17 March 1992. She was buried in the family grave in Kilchberg.

== Selected works ==
- Mann, Monika (1956). Vergangenes und Gegenwärtiges – Erinnerungen (in German). Munich: Kindler. ISBN 3-499-23087-9.
- Mann, Monika (2001). Vergangenes und Gegenwärtiges – Erinnerungen (in German) (Paperback ed.). Reinbek, Hamburg: Rowohlt. p. 144. ISBN 9783499230875.
- English translation by Reid, Frances F.; Hein, Ruth (1960). Past and Present – Recollections. New York: St Martin's Press.
- Der Start. Ein Tagebuch. Steinklopfer-Verlag, Fürstenfeldbruck 1960
- Tupfen im All. Hegner, Köln/Olten 1963
- Wunder der Kindheit. Bilder und Impressionen. Hegner, Köln/Olten 1966
- Der letzte Häftling. Eine wahre Legende in onore eines (letzten) Komponisten. Lemke, Lohhof 1967
- Das fahrende Haus. Aus dem Leben einer Weltbürgerin. Hrsg. with an epilogue by Karin Andert. Rowohlt, Reinbek 2007, ISBN 978-3-499-24513-8 (Interviews, Texte und Briefe)

== See also ==
- Dohm–Mann family tree
