= San Costanzo, Capri =

Monumental church of Capri, Italy

Coordinates: 40°33′4″N 14°14′17″E

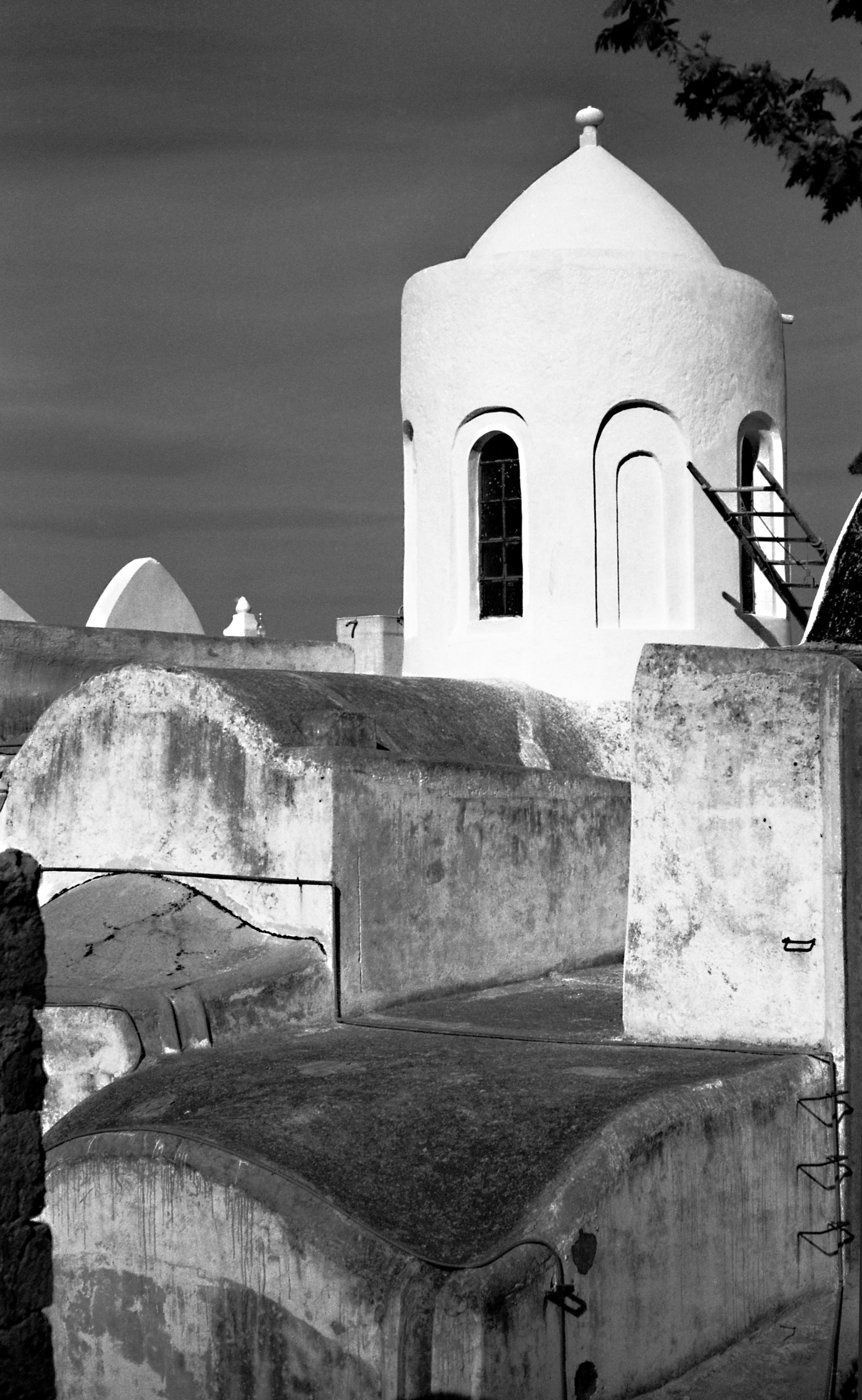
San Costanzo, Capri

The Chiesa di San Costanzo (Church of Constantius) is a monumental church of Capri. Named after the patron saint of the island of Capri, San Costanzo, it was the cathedral of the Roman Catholic Diocese of Capri from 987–1560.

== History ==
The exact date of construction of the church is still unknown but it is one of the oldest on the Island of Capri. Some historians believe its origins could date to the fifth century as it appears to be built on the ruins of a Roman building from the Late Republican period consisting of eight columns and two apses. Others state it may have been built between the ninth and the twelfth centuries. However, an early church certainly existed when the Diocese of Capri was created in 987. At the time, its early Christian character had been completely revamped as a Byzantine church with a plan in the form of a Greek cross. Originally it was dedicated to San Severino and only after the death of San Costanzo, in the seventh century, was it renamed. There were major renovations in 1330 when Count Giacomo Arcucci added a chancel in the typical Gothic style. In 1560, the church lost its status as a cathedral to Santo Stefano.

In 1775 the building was greatly weakened by the removal of three Numidian marble columns for use as flooring in the royal chapel of the Palace of Caserta; other damage occurred in 1928 the priest's house was built, as the front porch was demolished and the facade was altered. As a result, restructuring and consolidation was carried out from 1932 to 1935, giving the church its present look. The old structure can be seen in an 1840 watercolor by Giacinto Gigante.

In 1972, the church was also dedicated to Maria Santissima della Libera (Our Lady of the Free). In 1990, renovation work revealed a Roman opus signinum floor and a section of brick wall from the fifth century. It was not, however, established whether these findings were part of the church or of buildings which existed prior to its construction.

== Description ==
The church of San Costanzo has a very simple façade which dates from the late nineteenth and early twentieth century when the porch and triangular gable were demolished to provide stone for building the priest's house. It is divided in two by a narrow entablature. In the lower part, there is a doorway dating from the fourteenth century, surmounted by the crest of the Counts of Anjou, while in the upper part there are two of the priest's house windows. It reaches up into a small tympanum bordered by volutes.

The church takes the form of a Greek cross extending out from a central square into four groin-vaulted chapels. At the point where the arms intersect, the dome rises above a barrel vault supported by four arches. The perimeter was originally adorned by 12 columns, some removed for use in the Palace of Caserta. To the south, there is a square fourteenth-century sanctuary, to the west, the apse. The original entrance was probably on the eastern side, in line with the apse. Only after restoration work in the fourteenth century was it moved to the north. Outside, there is a small Arabic-styled belltower.
