= Capri funicular =

Funicular railway on the island of Capri

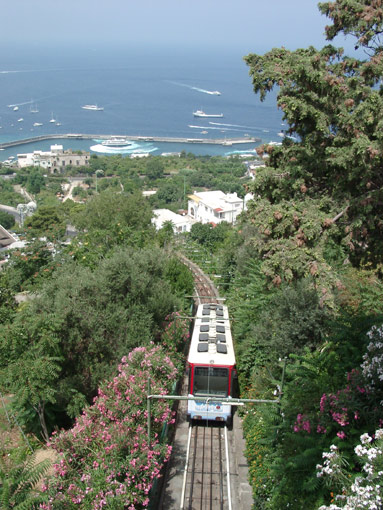

Overview
- Status: Open
- Locale: Capri, Campania, Italy
- Coordinates: 40.553339°N 14.241454°E

Service
- Type: Funicular
- Operator(s): SIPPIC

History
- Opened: 1907

Technical
- Line length: 670 m (2,200 ft)
- Track gauge: 1,000 mm (3 ft 3 3/8 in)
- Maximum incline: 38.6%

The Capri funicular (Italian: Funicolare di Capri) is a funicular railway on the island of Capri, in the Campania region of Italy. The line connects the Marina Grande on the coast with the Piazza Umberto I in the centre of the island. It is 670 metres (2,200 ft) long and includes a 68-metre (223 ft) tunnel and a 50-metre (160 ft) viaduct, climbing a vertical distance of 139 metres (456 ft).

The line was built by Von Roll and opened in 1907, being managed by the Società Imprese Capri (SIC). It was rebuilt in 1958, with the old four-wheeled cars replaced by much larger bogie cars, and the haulage equipment also replaced. A further rebuilding in 1991 again replaced the cars and haulage equipment. The line underwent a four-month upgrade in early 2018, with the work including replacement of the winding motors and a remodelling of the two cars, resulting in a 20% increase in capacity.

The line is now operated by the Società Anonima Imprese Pubbliche e Private Isola di Capri (SIPPIC) and operates every 15 minutes, or more frequently on demand, between 06:30 and 20:30 daily. It has the following parameters:

Capri funicular details
Number of stops	2
Configuration	Single track with passing loop
Length	670 m (2,198 ft)
Height	139 m (456 ft)
Maximum steepness	38.6%
Track gauge	1,000 mm (3 ft 3 3/8 in) metre gauge
Number of cars	2
Capacity	140 passengers per car
Trip time	5 minutes

== See also ==
- List of funicular railways
