= Constantius of Capri =

Catholic bishop

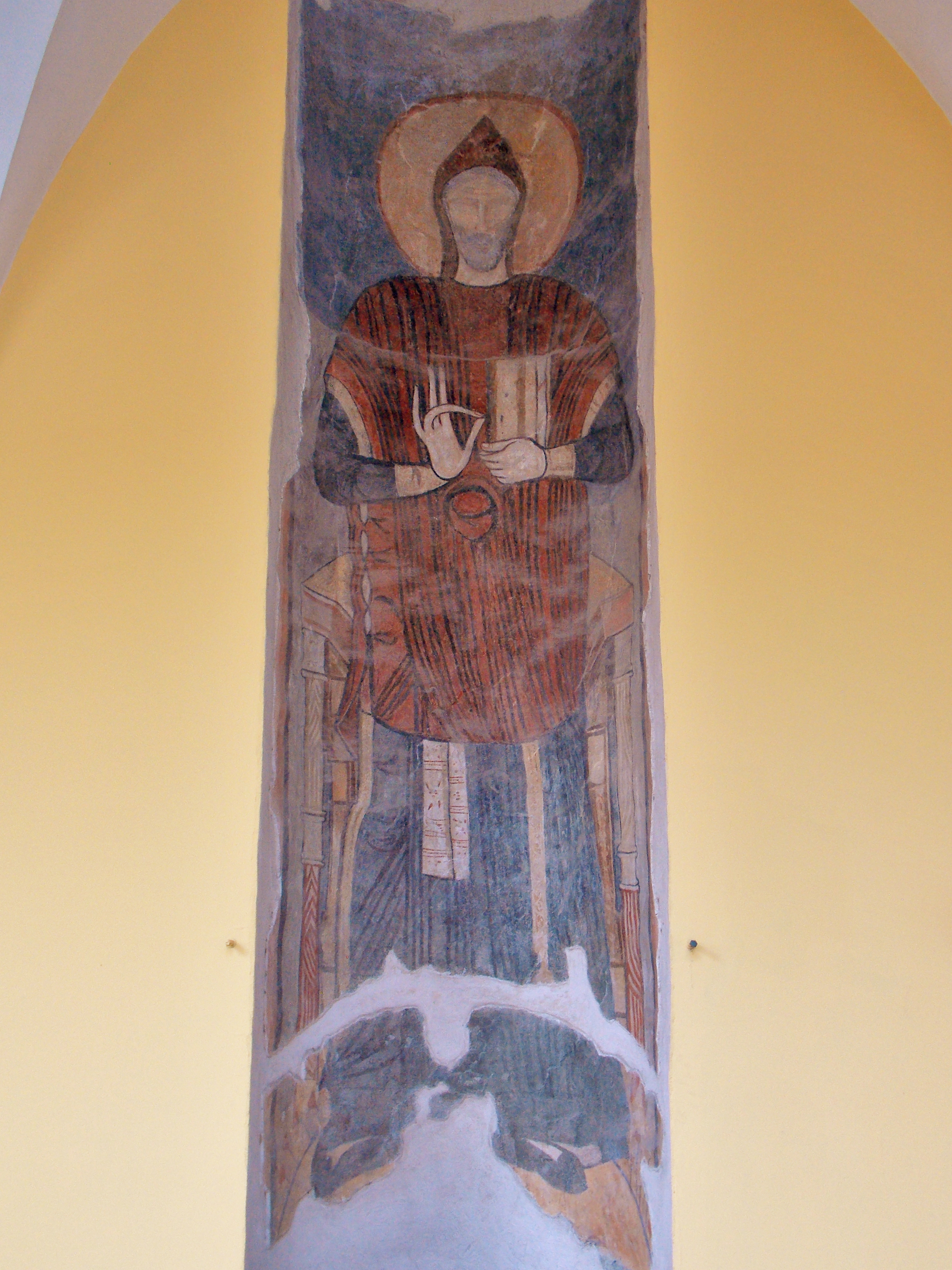
Convent of San Francesco di Benevento. Fresco of the church of San Costanzo

Constantius (born, Antonii de Ripolis; Italian, San Costanzo di Capri) (died 7th or 8th century, near Marina Grande) was a Bishop of the Catholic Church who, after many years wandering, became the patron saint of Capri.

== Biography ==
Little is known about him except that his body was placed in a barrel: the homilies Sermo de virtute Constantii (BHL 1931) and the Sermo de transito s. Constantii date from the end of the 10th century, when the saint's protection was invoked at Capri and Amalfi against Saracen raiders. How he came to be on the island is Capri is undocumented and shrouded in legend. In the Catalogus of monk Filippo Ferrari (died 1626), Constantius was described to be "of imperial lineage and Bishop of Constantinople". He may have been the Arian Constantius II who destroyed idols, or a bishop who fled from Africa to Italy. The Chiesa di San Costanzo is located between Marina Grande and Anacapri. The feast day of St Costanzo is celebrated on May 14 and includes commemoration of his arrival on Capri, which according to tradition, occurred c. 739.

A reliquary at Montevergine contains a bone with the label "Ossa S. Costantio E.C." [Episcopus Confessor].
