= Josef Rebell =

German painter

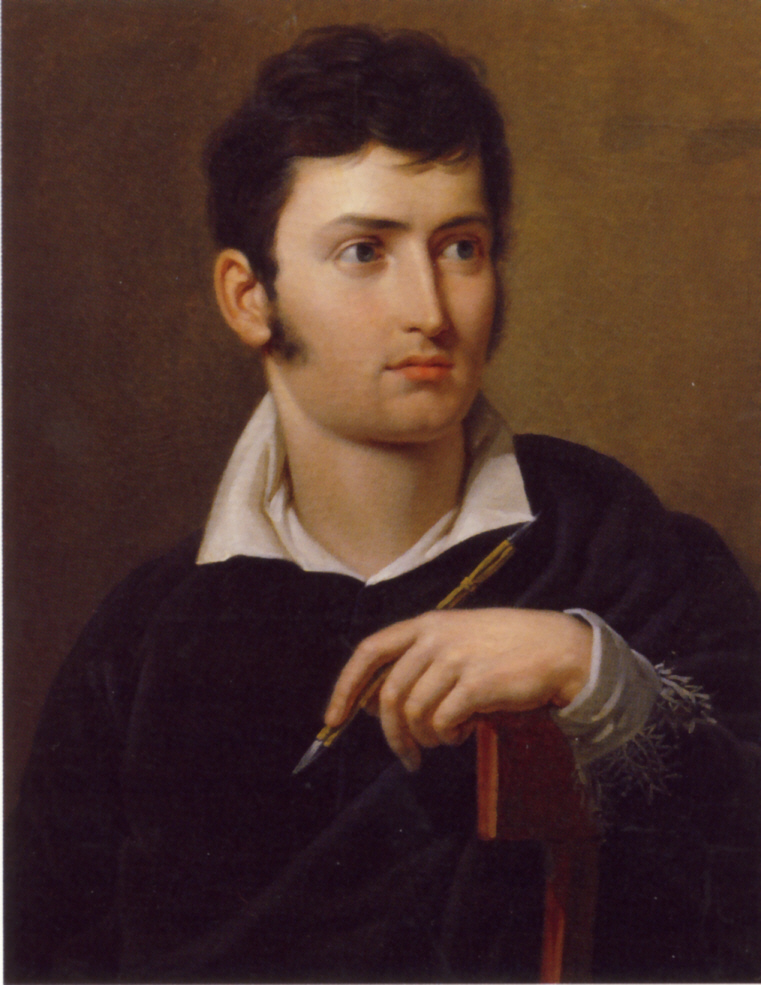
Josef Rebell (self-portrait).

Josef Rebell was a German/Austrian painter, born on 11 January 1787 in Vienna. He was a pupil of Michael Wutky at the Vienna Academy. In 1809 he travelled through Switzerland and proceeded thence to Milan, where for two years he resided at the Court of Eugene Beauharnais. Later on he went to Rome, and from 1811 to 1815 he was at the Court of Murat at Naples. Was appointed Director of the Belvedere Gallery at Vienna. He painted Italian landscapes, three examples of his work being in the Vienna Museum. Others are in the Munich Pinakothek, the Berlin Gallery, National Gallery Prague and the Parma Gallery. He died in Dresden on 18 December 1828.
