= Piazza Umberto I =

Square at Capri, Italy

Coordinates: 40°33′3″N 14°14′33″E

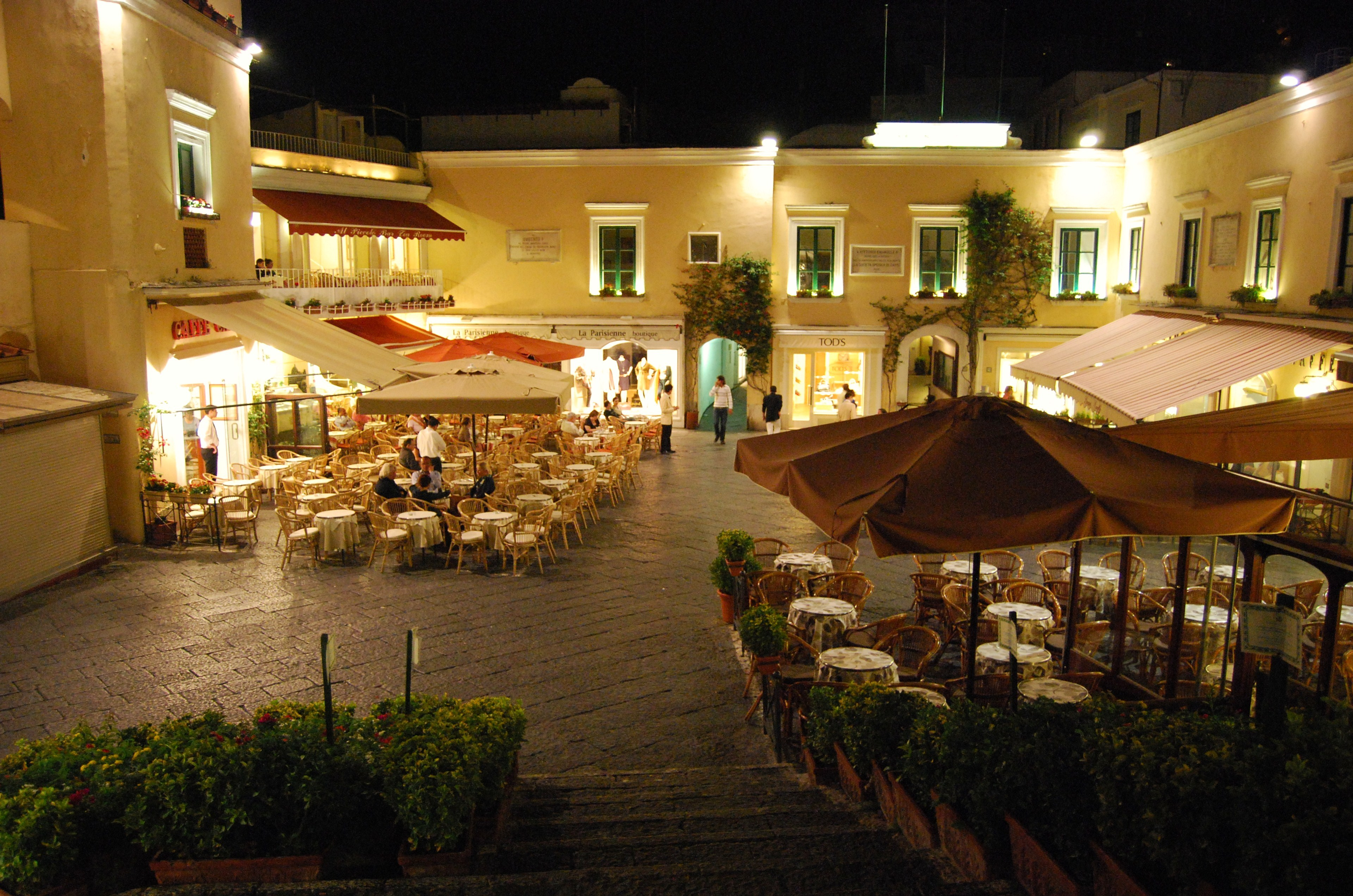
Piazza Umberto I

Piazza Umberto I (or Piazza Umberto Primo from the 1930s, La Piazzetta, meaning "little square"; nicknamed, "the little theater of the world") is the most famous square of the island of Capri, Italy. The square is located in the historic center of Capri, in the eponymous town Capri, on the eastern end of the island, and since Roman times, it has been considered the center of the town and the meeting point of the island by both residents and others.

== History ==
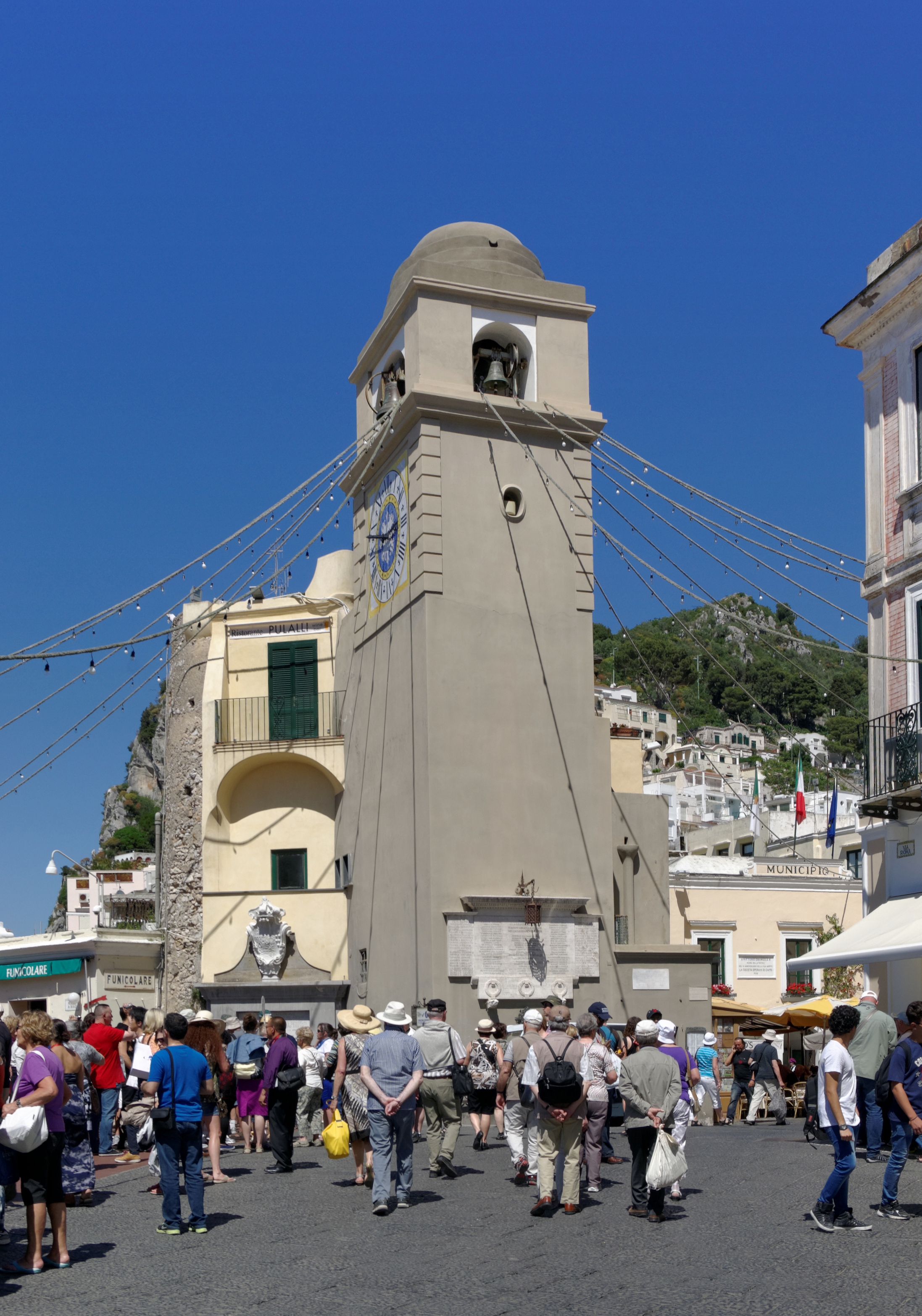
Clocktower

The church of Santo Stefano was built in the eighteenth century and was converted into a cathedral when the Bishop of Capri established his seat there. A staircase was added to connect the church with the square and the bishop's residence, now the town hall. The bishopry remained until 1818 when, by order of Pope Pius VII, the diocese was suppressed and Capri was absorbed into the Diocese of Sorrento.

The square was already well developed as the center of local life when, in 1900, it was home to produce markets of vegetables and fish and meat. The square took on a more worldly character only when Raffaele Vuotto opened his bar, the Grand Café Vuotto between 1934 and 1938, arranging the chairs and tables outside. Afterwards, other islanders opened their own businesses, and from that time on, the Piazzetta became the heart of social life on the island.

== Description ==
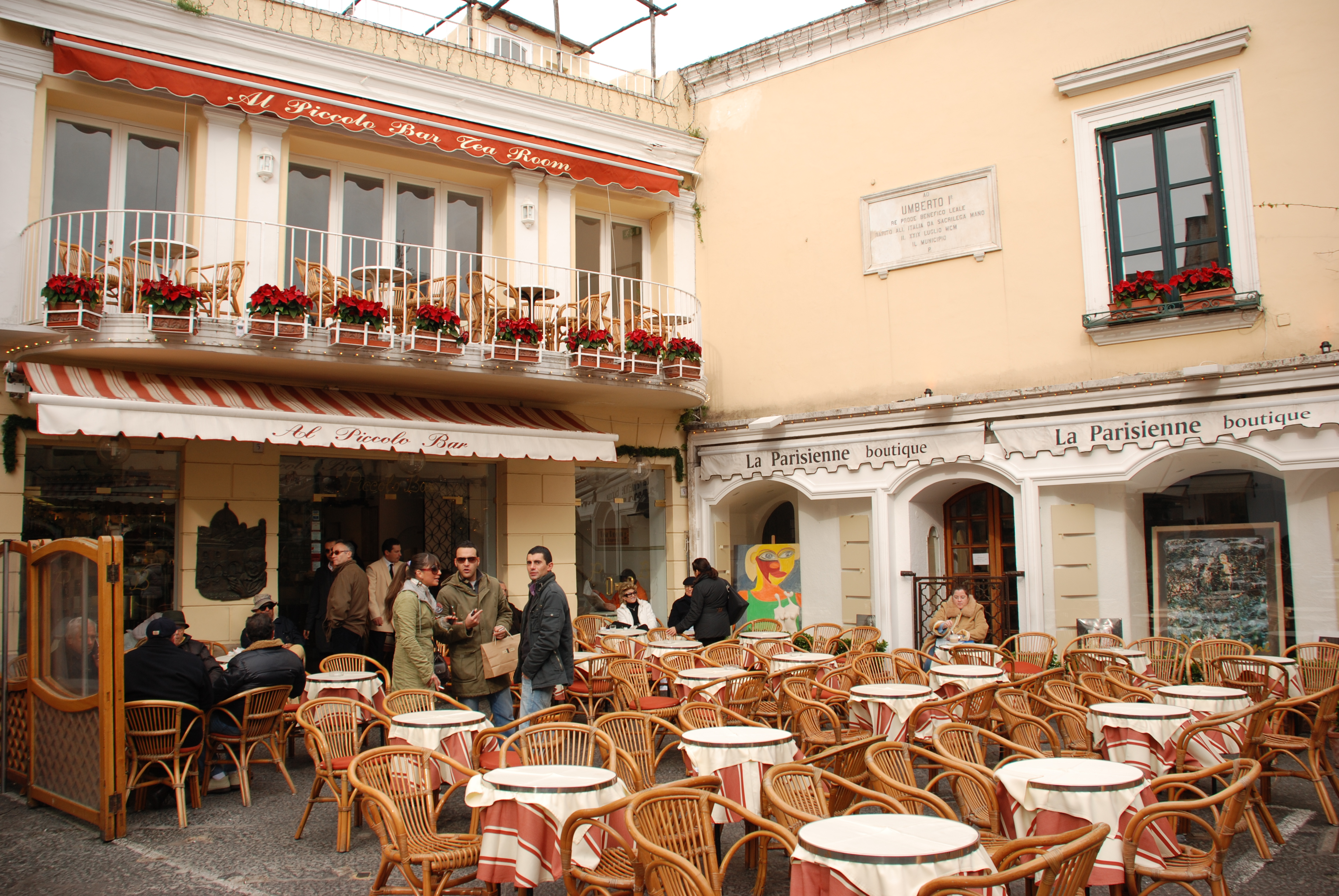
Al Piccolo Bar on the piazza

The main element of the square is the clock tower, which is very often associated with the island of Capri; it may have come the church of Hagia Sophia or a watchtower of the adjacent wall.

There are many inscriptions in the square: for example, outside the town hall there are two marble plaques which resemble Vittorio Emanuele II and Umberto I, another plaque commemorates the Caprese Gennaro Arcucci, martyr of the Bourbon restoration. Replacing one of the four facades of the tower is a plaque commemorating the fallen in World War I.

Other plaques (raised in 1908) are present in the courtyard of City Hall, where two epigraphs remember Henry Wreford, a Times correspondent who came to Capri for a day and decided to settle for fifty years, and the Scot George Sidney Clark, who in 1861 opened the largest hotel on the island, the notable Grand Hotel Quisisana.
