= Via Krupp =

Walking path in Capri

Coordinates: 40°32′49″N 14°14′33″E

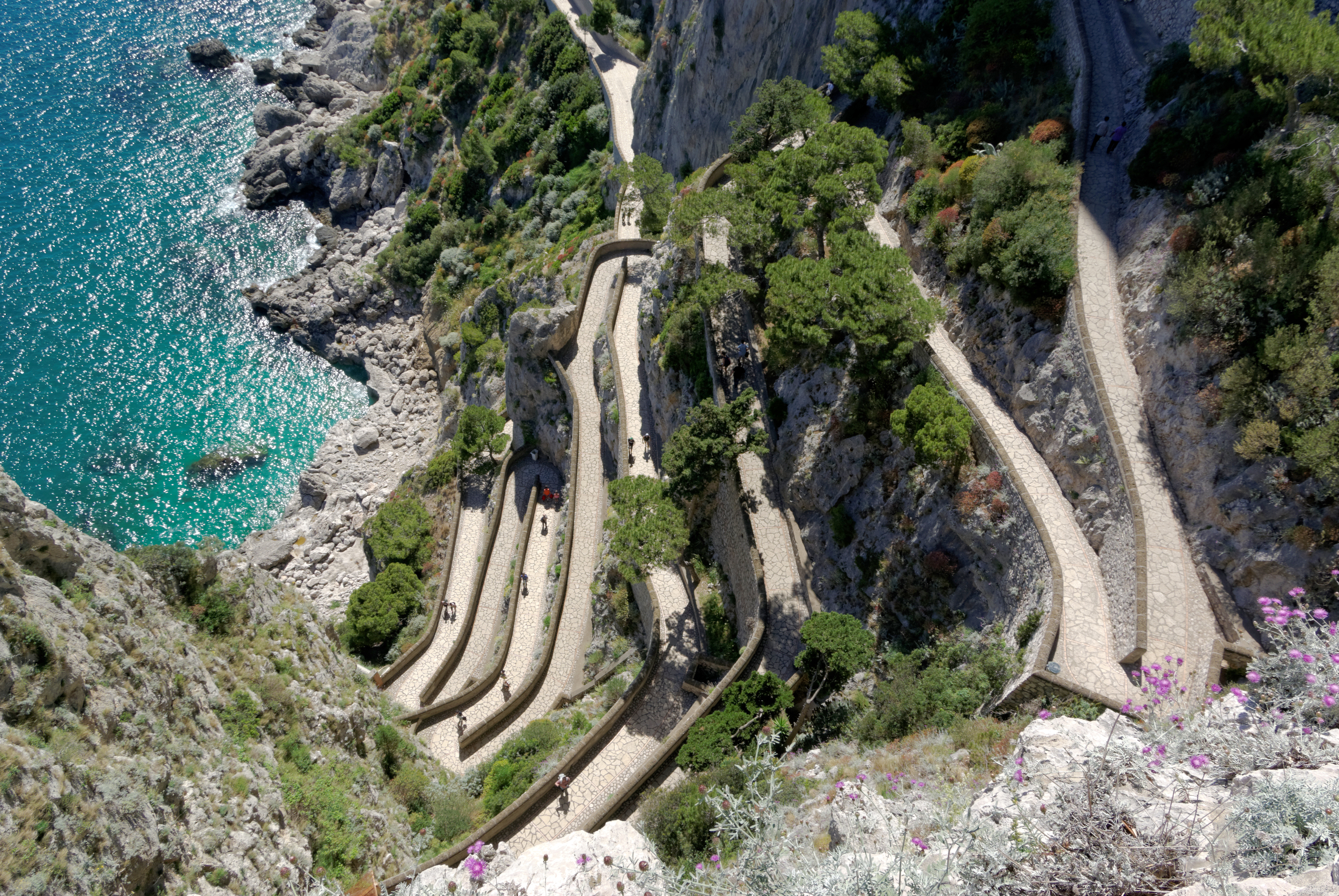

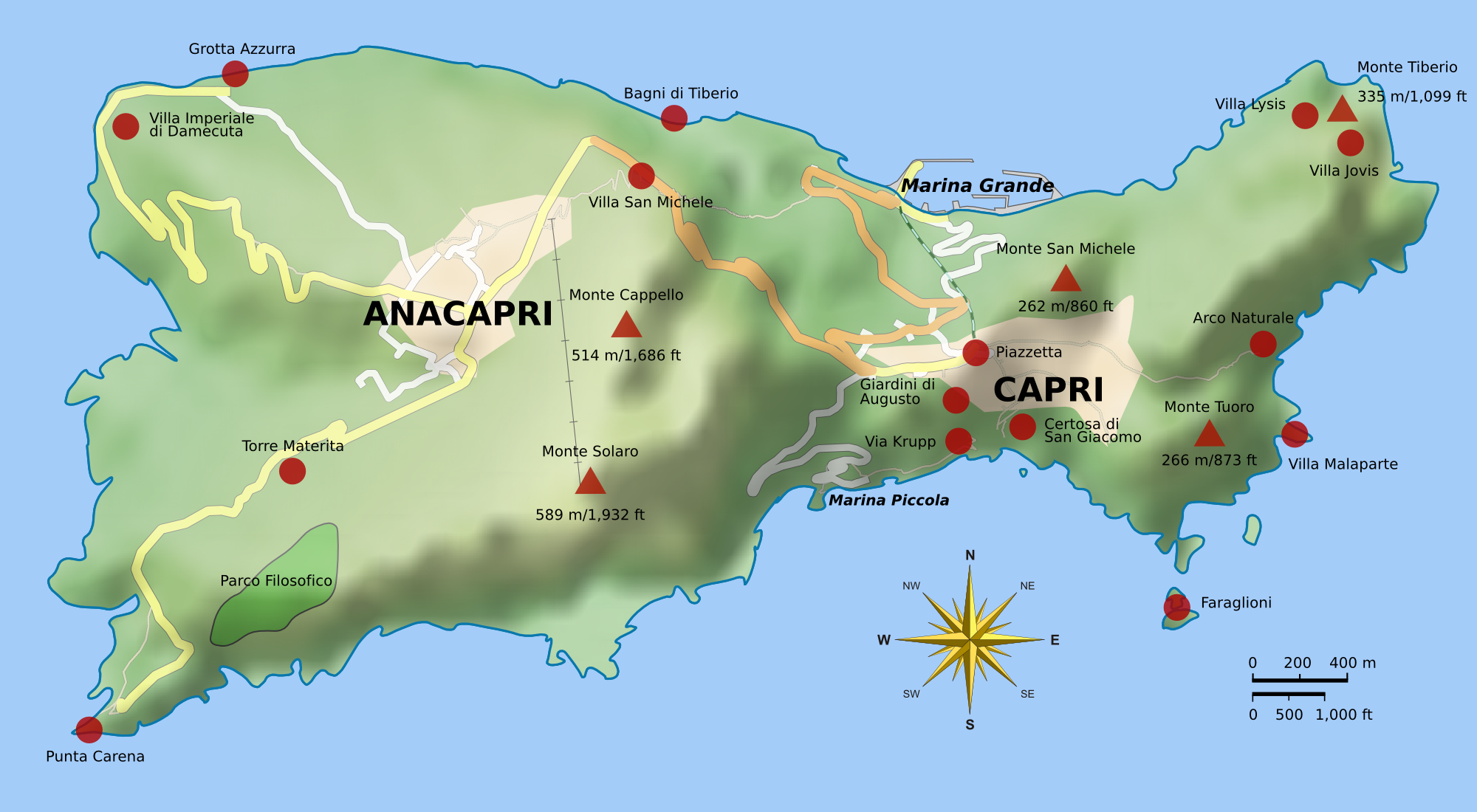
Location of Via Krupp on the south coast of Capri near Marina Piccola

Via Krupp is a historic hairpin turn paved footpath on the island of Capri, connecting the Charterhouse of San Giacomo and the Gardens of Augustus area with Marina Piccola. Commissioned by the German industrialist Friedrich Alfred Krupp, the path covers an elevation difference of about 100 m (330 ft).

Built between 1900 and 1902, Via Krupp was ostensibly a connection for Krupp between his luxury hotel, Grand Hotel Quisisana, and Marina Piccola, where his marine biology research vessel lay at anchor. Secretly, however, this path also conveyed him to the Grotta di Fra Felice, a grotto where sex orgies with local youths took place. When the scandal surfaced, Krupp was asked to leave Italy in 1902.

Since 1976, Via Krupp has been closed most of the time due to the danger of falling rocks.

== See also ==
- Tyrrhenian Sea
- Villa Hügel (Villa Krupp), Germany: built by Friedrich Alfred Krupp's father
- Via Vittorio Emanuele III
