= Grand Hotel Quisisana =

Hotel in Capri, Italy

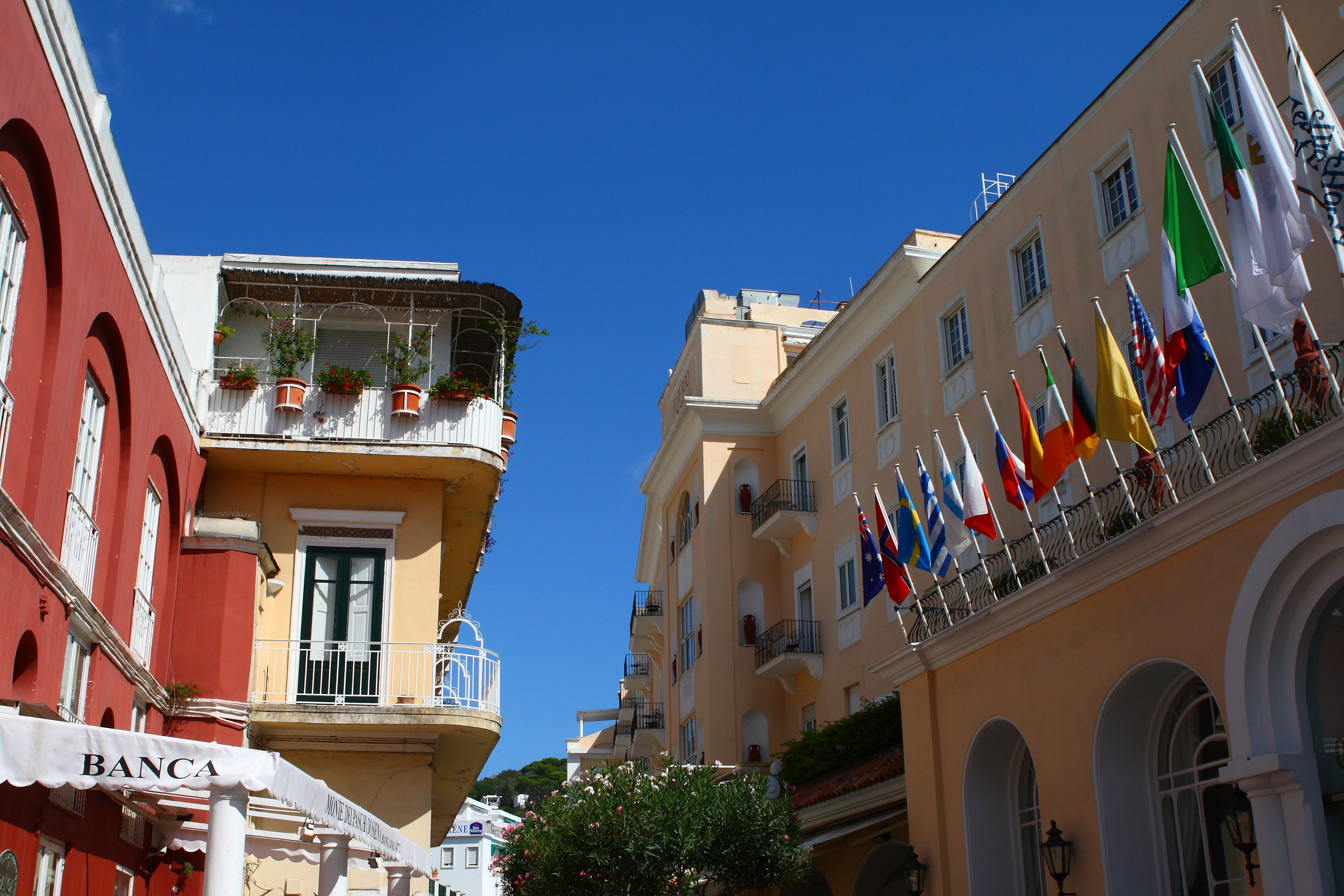

- Location within Italy

General information
- Location: Capri, Campania, Italy
- Coordinates: 40°32′58″N 14°14′39″E
- Opening: 1861

Other information
- Number of rooms: 148
- Number of restaurants: 3

Website
- quisisana.com

The Grand Hotel Quisisana is the largest hotel on the island of Capri. It is located in the old town of Capri, opposite to the Hotel Residenza Capri and the Villa Sanfelice, to the south of the Piazza Umberto I. It was founded as a sanatorium in 1845 by the British doctor George Sidney Clark, who turned it into the Grand Hotel Quisisana in 1861. "Qui si sana" means "here one heals" in Italian.

The hotel contains 148 rooms. It has eight conference rooms, one of which can accommodate up to 500 people. The hotel's indoor restaurant, Restaurant Quisi, serves Italian cuisine and has been cited as one of Italy's finest hotel restaurants.

Notable guests of the hotel include Russian writer Maxim Gorky, Russian singer Feodor Chaliapin, Oscar Wilde (together with Lord Alfred Douglas) and Friedrich Alfred Krupp. Other notable guests have been Tom Cruise, Sidney Sheldon, Gianni Agnelli, Claudette Colbert, Jean-Paul Sartre, Gerald Ford, and Sting. After escaping Egypt in 1952, King Farouk I was a guest of the hotel during part of his exile in Italy.

Since 1986, the Grand Hotel has been a member of The Leading Hotels of the World.
