= Capri Bird Observatory =

Bird observatory in Italy

Coordinates: 40°33′20″N 14°13′37″E

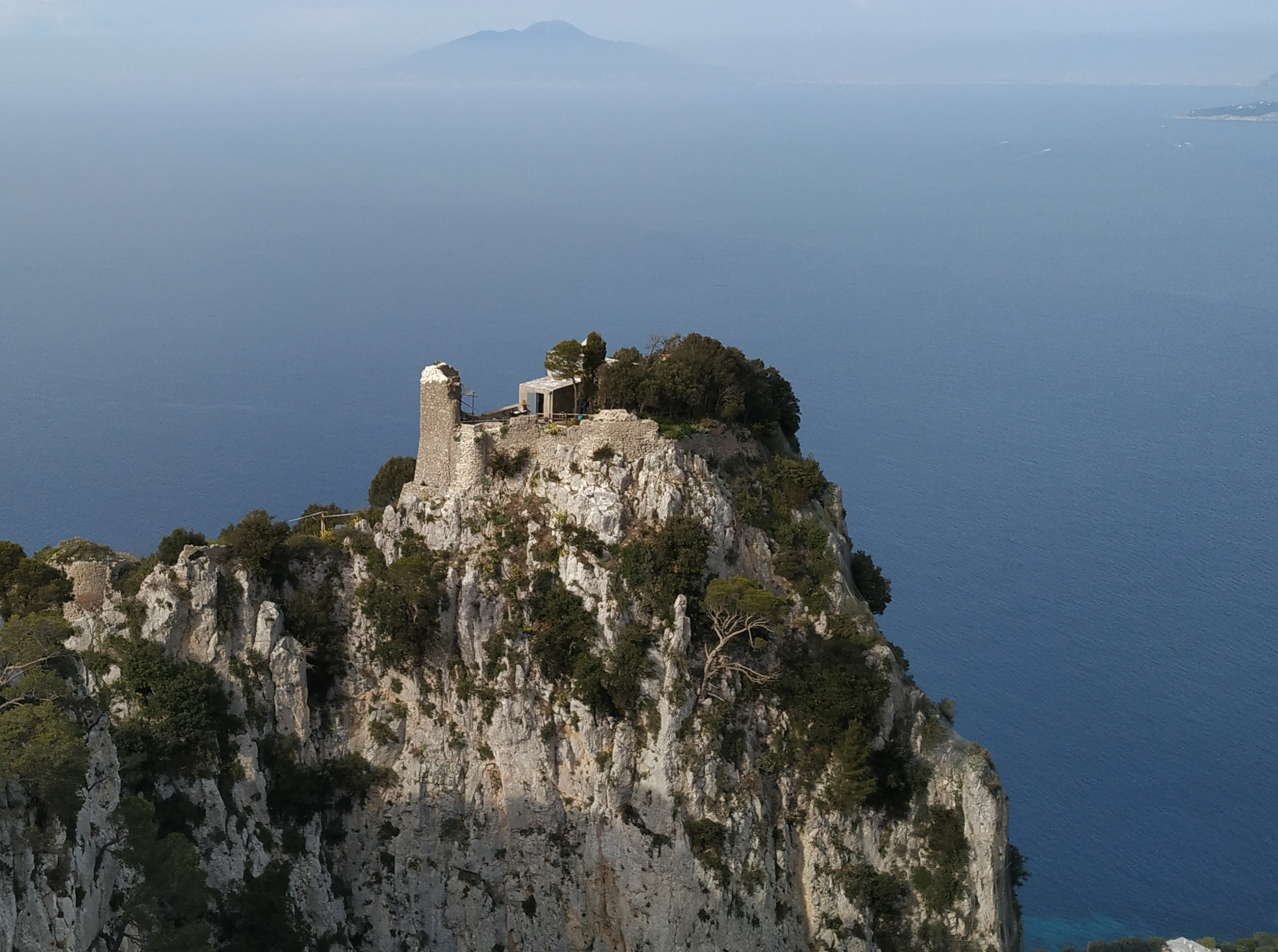
Capri Bird Observatory, housed in the ruins of Castello Barbarossa on a clifftop overlooking the Gulf of Naples

Capri Bird Observatory is a bird observatory on the island of Capri in the Gulf of Naples, Italy. It was established in 1956, on land that had been donated to the Swedish state by physician and socialite Axel Munthe. Until 1983, Swedish researchers conducted bird ringing each spring at the bird observatory. Since 1986, the observatory has been used by both Italian and Swedish researchers.

== History ==
=== Background and foundation ===
The Italian island of Capri, located in the Gulf of Naples, is an important stopover locale for birds migrating across the Mediterranean Sea between Africa and Europe. Its ornithological importance has been known for a long time, and traditionally bird trapping has been an important source of income for the islanders. In particular quail were caught in huge numbers, and sold as foodstuff to places as far away as Rome and Marseille. The Bishop of Capri historically got a part of the tithe in the form of quail and was sometimes called the "Quail Bishop".

A first comprehensive study of the island's birdlife was published by the German naturalist Alexander Koenig in 1886, followed by an Italian account in 1890 by Ignazio Cerio. Koenig's study also described the bird trapping practices and called for its prohibition.

The Swedish physician and socialite Axel Munthe moved to Capri in 1892, and established himself at Villa San Michele. Munthe, who was a lover of birds, became engaged for the protection of the island's birdlife. He bought land adjacent to his villa (including the site of the future bird observatory) in order to shield it from bird hunting, and eventually also convinced the Fascist government to ban bird hunting on Capri. After Munthe's death in 1949, his estate on Capri was donated to the Swedish state. The curator, Josef Oliv, invited the Swedish Ornithological Society (forerunner of BirdLife Sverige) to use the premises to conduct research, particularly of the migration of Nordic birds across the Mediterranean. A first visit to the site was made in 1950 by the head of Ottenby Bird Observatory, but due to a lack on funding a bird observatory could only be set up in 1956. From then on, bird ringing using mist nets has been carried out at the bird observatory. Initially the intention was to use the Punta Carena Lighthouse, but for practical reasons the ruins of Castello Barbarossa, on land bought by Munthe, was used instead.

=== History of the bird observatory ===
From the 1950s until 1979, the bird observatory was administered by the Swedish Ornithological Society, and then by the Swedish Museum of Natural History. During the first decades bird ringing took place regularly at Capri Bird Observatory, but the research resulted in few academic publications. The observatory also played a crucial role in providing on-site learning about Mediterranean bird migration for ornithologists. Between 1983 and 1986 there was no Swedish presence, and instead the observatory was utilised by first the Lega italiana protezione uccelli or LIPU, i.e. the Italian League for Bird Protection, and a bit later by a bird ringing centre in Bologna. The Swedish Ornithological Society returned in 1986, led by the head of Ottenby Bird Observatory in Sweden, and the bird observatory has since been used by both Italian and Swedish researchers.

== Location ==
The bird observatory is located on a rock overlooking the Gulf of Naples, not far from Villa San Michele. It is housed among the ruins of a medieval castle, Castello Barbarossa. The castle originally dates from the 10th or 11th century, but derives its name from Hayreddin Barbarossa, a 16th-century Ottoman admiral and corsair.

== Research ==
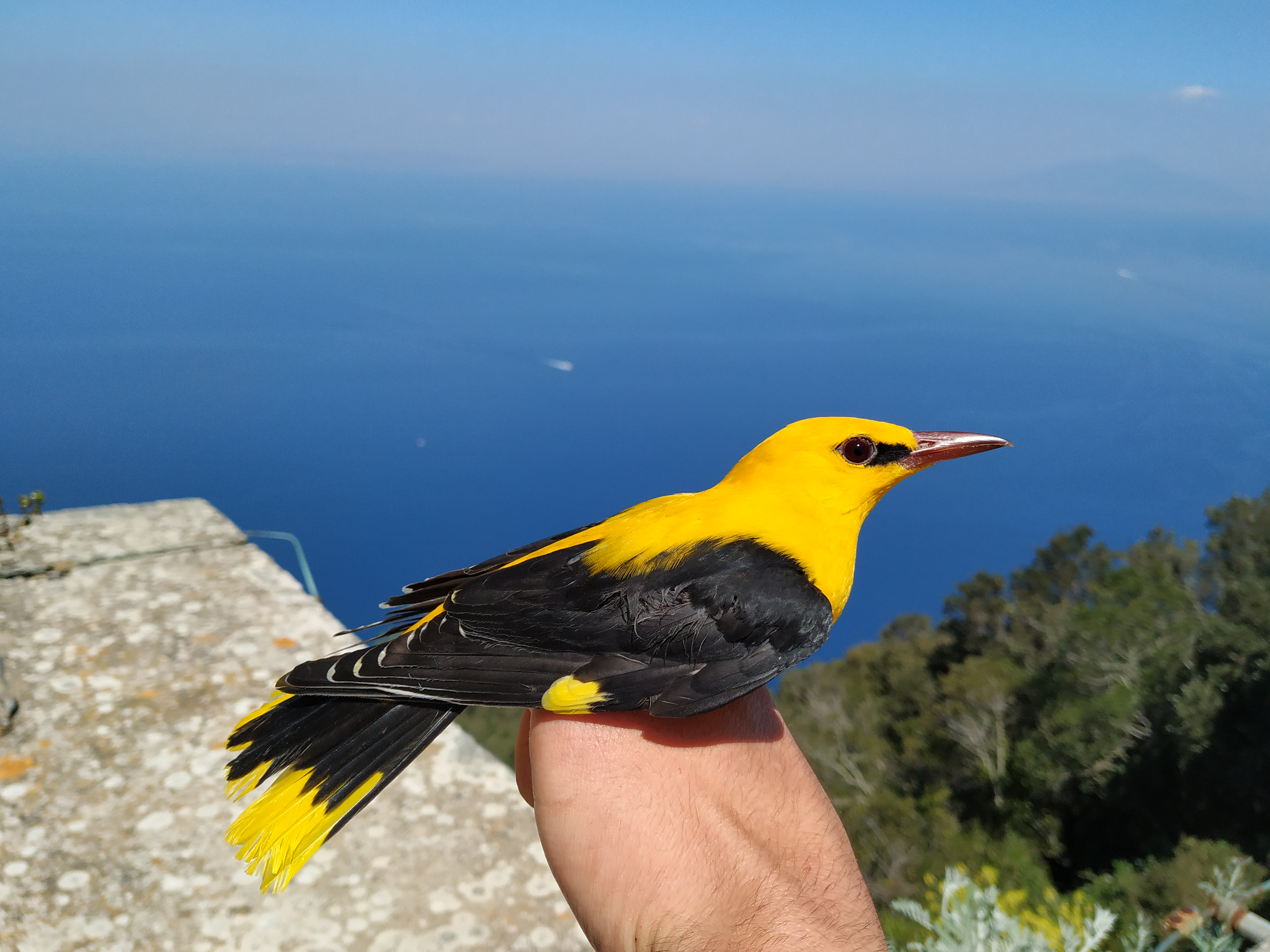
A Eurasian golden oriole ringed at Capri Bird Observatory

The research activity that has been conducted at Capri Bird Observatory can be divided into phases. The first period, from the foundation of the observatory until 1983, the activity concentrated mostly on bird ringing during spring by ornithologists from Sweden, although some ringing during autumn was also done. From 1983, systematic bird ringing in spring has been carried out by Italian researchers; from the mid-1990s, Swedish researchers undertook autumn ringing. Finally, since 2004 the Swedish activity has shifted to various specialised projects and the systematic autumn ringing has stopped. Examples of specialised studies that have used data from Capri Bird Observatory include studies on the possible role of migratory birds in spreading the West Nile virus, and on changes to the timing of bird migration in response to climate change. The observatory has also been used for field work connected to butterfly migration. Capri Bird Observatory has been highlighted as an example of how the study of migratory birds may foster international cooperation in research and conservation.

== Sources cited ==
- Edelstam, Carl; Broberg, Lars; Engström, Boris; Jenning, Wolf; Lundberg, Stig (1963). "Den svenska fågelstationen på Capri och dess verksamhet 1956-61" (PDF). Vår fågelvärld (in Swedish). 22 (4). BirdLife Sverige: 225–270.
- Hagman, Karl; Barboutis, Christos; Ehrenborg, Christian; Fransson, Thord; Jaenson, Thomas G.T. (2014). "On the potential roles of ticks and migrating birds in the ecology of West Nile virus". Infection Ecology & Epidemiology. 4 (1). Taylor & Francis.
- Hjort, Christian (2006). "Capri Bird Observatory – a brief historical overview". Ornis Svecica. 16. BirdLife Sverige: 13–20.
- Hjort, Christian; Andersson, Arne; Waldenström, Jonas (2006). "Wintering birds on the island of Capri, southwestern Italy". Ornis Svecica. 16. BirdLife Sverige: 62–68.
- Jonzén, Niclas; Lindén, Andreas; Ergon, Torbjørn; Knudsen, Endre (2006). "Rapid Advance of Spring Arrival Dates in Long-Distance Migratory Birds". Science. 312 (5782): 1959–1961.
- Spina, Fernando; Piacentini, Dario; Montemaggiori, Alessandro (2006). "Bird migration across the Mediterranean: ringing activities on Capri within the Progetto Piccole Isole". Ornis Svecica. 16. BirdLife Sverige: 20–26.
