= Castello Barbarossa =

Archaeological ruin in Anacapri, Italy

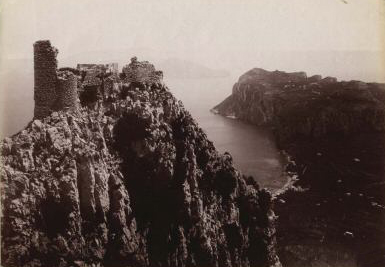
- Photo of Castello Barbarossa from 1890

- Location within Italy
- 40°33′21″N 14°13′37″E
- Type: Fortification
- Location: Anacapri, Province of Naples, Campania, Italy

History
- Built: Approximately 9th century
- Abandoned: 1544

Castello Barbarossa is an archaeological ruin and ornithological station in Anacapri, on the island of Capri, Italy. It is named after the former corsair and Ottoman Kapudan Pasha (Admiral) Hayreddin Barbarossa, who stormed it in 1535 and destroyed it in 1544. The construction date is uncertain but it perhaps dates back to the late ninth century. From 1898, the structure, now in ruins, was owned by the Swedish psychiatrist Axel Munthe who donated it to his foundation. The surroundings, interesting for their botanical features, are home to the island's ornithological station, Capri Bird Observatory.

== History ==
The castle's construction date (ca. late ninth century) is uncertain. It is known to have existed at the end of the tenth century. Taking advantage of local labour, the Dukes of Amalfi built it in order to gain full control over the island of Capri. The manor house was originally owned by Adelferio, son of Sergius II (d. 1028), who called the area Anglum ad Castellum ("the corner near the castle"). On 15 November 988, Adelferio donated the castle, as well as his other possessions in Anacapri (including Artimo, Orrico and Gradola), to Giovanni, Count of Capri. The document refers to "unam silvam ad angulum ipsum castellum" (a wood at the corner of the castle). Protected by the fortress, the area enjoyed a period of stability in the tenth and eleventh centuries.

The Norman conquest of Campania forced the Dukes of Amalfi to modernize the structure to provide greater resistance to the enemy. The interior of the fortress was then extended with new features, including a chapel with a buttressed vault. Other additions from the thirteenth century included a cylindrical tower, two protective walls and other items necessitated by the development of siege techniques and firearms. In the fifteenth century, the island of Capri was subjected to attacks by Muslim pirates. Consequently, the population often used the fortress as a refuge. But after the raids in 1535, led by Ottoman pirates Hayreddin Barbarossa and Dragut, the fortress was destroyed in 1544, and those who had taken shelter there were kidnapped or robbed. Rather than being named after its builder, the castle derives its name from its pirate destroyer. The Angevins attempted to reconstruct the fortress, but without success as the Neapolitans had little building experience. It therefore fell on the inhabitants of Anacapri to care for the fortress which, as a result, was never rebuilt.

Barbarossa Castle was then almost totally forgotten until the eighteenth century when the manor was included in some geographical treaties. At the beginning of the nineteenth century, it was however used for military purposes after reinforcement by both the British (1806), who built embrasures for riflemen and a powder house, and by the French (1808), who built a defensive wall which extended from the castle to the Phoenician Steps. In the mid-nineteenth century, after the growing interest of literary circles in the Mediterranean environment and archaeological findings, itinerant scholars described the castle as "a ruin immersed in wonderfully wild surroundings", and in the first half of the twentieth century the site became a must in all Capri's maps and travel guides.

As already mentioned, the castle with the surrounding land was purchased by Munthe who, as he hated hunting, made it a sanctuary for birds. Throughout his life, Munthe campaigned to abolish hunting and was able to convince Benito Mussolini himself to draw up legislation denying hunters access to the island. As of 1950, a year after Munthe's death, the castle became part of the Axel Munthe Foundation under the ownership of the Swedish Consulate.

== Architecture and fittings ==
The plan of the castle is quadrangular with a semicircular wall. The ruins of the highest part, as well as forming the core of the building, belong to what was once the residential area of the castle. Indeed, there is a chapel with a vaulted apse, a belfry and a cistern that was used as a warehouse. Another area, offset from the chapel, retains many features, including a vaulted roof, a small partly walled embrasure, and an arched opening. Finally, there is a room with an iron-beamed roof. Built of local stone, the fort has vaulted roofs and tiled floors. The most significant architectural features are its two towers, indicating the military function of the castle. One of them, square-shaped, was built in the Swabian period, the other, however, is circular and was built in the Angevin period.

== Grounds ==
Barbarossa Castle is located in Anacapri's Villa San Michele district, not far from the Grotta dell' Arco. It is situated 412 metres (1,352 ft) above sea level on a plateau of 250 square metres (2,700 sq ft), on one side of Mount Solaro.

The area in front of the fort is characterized by low bush or garrigue and by vegetation that can withstand drought as a result of low nutritional requirements. Plants include strawberry tree, coronilla, euphorbia, heathers, gorse and myrtle. In the winter, the anemone, asphodel, brassica, honeysuckle, crocus, and rock rose bloom. Near the castle, there are some Aleppo pines. Indeed, in 1901, Munthe planted a pine forest, part of which was lost during the fires of 1972 and 1987.

== Ornithological station ==
Ornithologists live and work at Barbarossa in the present day. It is a useful location as Mount Solaro is an important stop for migratory birds that nest in Europe and fly to Africa for the winter. The station was established in 1956 by the Swedish Ornithological Society (today BirdLife Sverige). Until 1983, Swedish researchers conducted bird ringing each spring at the bird observatory. Since 1986, the observatory has been used by both Italian and Swedish researchers. The Swedish experts are attached to the bird station on the island of Öland and although they initially concentrated on spring and autumn migrations, they are now involved in specific projects such as the birds' aptitude for orientation during the longest migrations and the causes of diseases transmitted by birds as well as studies on the migration of butterflies.

== Bibliography ==
- Conoscere Capri: Studi e materiali per la storia di Capri. (2006). Capri: Oebalus. Vol. 4. (in Italian) ISBN 888909706X
- Conoscere Capri: Studi e materiali per la storia di Capri. (2008). Capri: Oebalus. Vol. 7. (in Italian) ISBN 9788889097120
