= Cerio (surname) =

Cerio is an Italian surname which has records from 1880s. Notable people with the surname include:

- Edwin Cerio (1875–1960), Italian writer, engineer, architect, historian, and botanist
- Claretta Cerio (1927–2019), Italian writer
- Ferruccio Cerio (1904–1963), Italian film writer and director
- Ignazio Cerio (1841–1921), Italian physician and amateur philosopher
- Iñigo Díaz de Cerio (born 1984), Spanish football player
- Nicholas Raymond Cerio (1936–1998), American martial artist
- Stefano Cerio, Italian photographer and video artist
