= Cerio (disambiguation) =

Cerio can refer to:

- Cerio, a village in Álava, Basque Country, Spain
- Cerio (surname), list of people with the name
