= Villa Solitaria =

Coordinates: 40°32′42.66″N 14°15′15.04″E

Villa Solitaria, also known as Casa Solitaria or La Solitaria, is a national historic house built between 1907 and 1910 via del Pizzolungo on the island of Capri (Naples, Italy) by Edwin Cerio (1875–1960), a prominent Italian writer, engineer, architect, historian, and botanist

Surrounded by cliffs and mediterranean plants, isolated yet a few minutes away from Capri's vibrant central piazzetta, it overlooks the most famous rocky stacks in the Mediterranean, the Faraglioni. The particular shape and the legends that hover around the Faraglioni make them magical and evocative places. Homer, in the Odyssey, describes the stacks as the boulders that the Cyclops Polyphemus threw at Ulysses. In the Aeneid, Virgil speaks of it as the meeting place of the siren : from these imposing rocks came their sweet song that enchanted the sailors.

The house's foundations and its theater-shaped garden's walls likely date from the middle-age or possibly earlier. The antique Roman imperial port of Tragara, and the Scoglio del Monacone where Masgaba, the architect of Emperor Augustus, was buried, are in the immediate vicinity of the house.

Edwin Cerio built the house without predetermined plans, together with the skills and feelings of local masons, so that each window would become “a painting signed by God”. It filled it with lilies and thistles ceramic floors, and quotes inspired by the biblical Song of Songs’ poetry.

Filippo Tommaso Marinetti, founder of the Futurism movement in 1909, and credited with spurring the rise of Italian modern architecture and city planning, described La Solitaria as one of the first futurist house of Italy for its verticality, spatial and visual innovations.

Edwin Cerio rented the house from 1914 to 1924 to Sir Edward Compton MacKenzie, a famous Scottish writer of fiction, biography, history. During this time, La Solitaria became the central meeting point of the English writers living or transiting in Capri, such as Norman Douglas, Francis Brett Young, William Butler Yeats, David Herbert Lawrence, as well as the Scottish music critic and composer, Cecil Gray. Compton MacKenzie shared with Douglas a passion for botanics, and did plant pines and cypress as well as exotic plants brought back from their numerous overseas trips.

At the end of the 1920s, when the MacKenzies had already left the Capri Island, Edwin Cerio sold the Solitaria to the well-known neuro-radiologist Mario Bertolotti from Turin and to his son Sergio Bertolotti who in the 1960s designed and realized the first TV networks of RAI.

In the first 1930s, Mario Bertolotti, with the design of Edwin Cerio, made at the higher floor of the Solitaria a small addition for the purpose of making the house more comfortable, after which the original Cerio plan was not modified any more.

In September 1948, when the RAI invited to Capri for a meeting all the representatives of the European Broadcasting Houses to establish on the island a radiophonic concourse of international radiophonic productions – later named Premio Italia – Sergio Bertolotti invited the participants for a party on the terrace of the Solitaria, in front of the Faraglioni, that together with the “piazzetta” are the most emblematic places of the island, as everybody knows. The admiration for the house was unanimous.

“The exceptionality of this house – has written professor Fabio Mangone – notably increased not only because professor Mario Bertolotti built in the garden a kind of small sanctuary of Knosso to mask a cistern, but also because with an exceptional decision he realized in this word angle outside time, near a dolomitic wall, a family burial ground, which was authorized in 1938 and effectively realized only in 1947, for himself and his family members where he is buried together with his wife Bice Lupo, president of the Pro Cultura in Turin, an extraordinary organizer of musical concerts with performers and conductors of international level - and the nephew Elena, actress, young pupil of the Accademia di Arte Drammatica.

In the years during which the Bertolotti inhabited the house a number of people were hosted as Edwin Cerio, Leonardo Bistolfi, Raffaele La Capria, Roberto Pane, Lamberti Sorrentino, Letitia Cerio, Roger Peyrefitte, Curzio Malaparte, Marino and Ilari Barendson, Diego Cortez, Bruno Racine, Tommaso e Giuliana Setari.

For avoiding that the Solitaria and the nearby space as it was consolidated during the time could be in any way modified and twisted, in 1993, the owners asked and obtained from the State a monumental constrain “over the Solitaria and the nearby space known as “Pizzolungo zone”.

The house has been inhabited by the Bertolotti’s family until 2022 when it has been sold to two young intellectuals, Benoit Duplat and Cristiano Leone, and maintaining - according to the law - a right of way to reach the graves that the buyers are obliged to make practicable.

Before the sale, in 2022, the owner wrote a book on the history of the house and of its inhabitants with the title “Capri. Casa Solitaria, Una tomba vicino al mare e una casa fra le rocce” dedicating it to her daughter Elena “who loved Capri and the Solitaria, and to all Bertolotti who for one hundred years have been the owners of this extraordinary house.”
