= Anna Grima =

Maltese artist (born 1958)

Anna Grima (born 1958) is a Maltese artist whose works have been exhibited in several European countries. Some of her work is held permanently in the National Art Collection of Malta through the Fondazzjoni Kreattività Art Collection.

== Early years ==
Her earliest formative influence, starting at age nine, was her aunt Blanche Ellul Sullivan (1907–2002), who studied under Edward Caruana Dingli.

Grima started her career as an illustrator and graphic artist. She was granted a scholarship by the Italian Cultural Institute at the Accademia di Belle Arti in Perugia, Italy in 1982. There she focused her studies on the nude under the direction of Bruno Orfei.

== Career ==
After taking part in collective exhibitions in Malta and Italy, her first solo exhibition was at Fontainebleau's Galerie Ripard in Paris, France, in 1984.

Her work appears on the front cover of the 1989 publication The Cultural Identity of Malta National Congress, which was published by the Government of Malta as part of the twenty-fifth anniversary celebrations of Independence Day.

In 1995 she was commissioned by the Government of Malta to design a set of stamps featuring Anniversaries and Events.

In 2010, Grima's abstract paintings were exhibited as part of the Berlaymont Summa Artis II Collection at the Berlaymont Building, House of the European Commission in Brussels Two of her paintings were chosen to be displayed for a period of five years until 2015.

Grima's work was exhibited at the Mdina Biennale in 2015 along with artists like Dario Fo, Francesco Infante, and Richard England.

In 2017 she was invited to teach at the University of Malta's B.A. program in Digital Arts with Vince Briffa, after she had recently gained a Master of Fine Art in Digital Arts from the same department.

In 2018 and 2019, her works were exhibited as part of the Art+Feminism exhibition held at Spazju Kreattiv, Malta.

== Exhibitions ==
Since 1984 Anna Grima participated in solo and group exhibitions in various countries. These include Maltese Landscape and Still Life - Museum of Fine Arts, Valletta, Malta in 1992, Earth & Sky - International Woman's Day, United Nations, Geneva, Switzerland in 1995, Marine Life - Watercolour Esplenade Plaza Hotel, Fremantle, W Australia in 1986, Sacred Footprints - Neolithia Foundation and Peninsula Arts, Plymouth University, UK in 2005., 70/2000, The Road to Meikel Seiggie - DEA Foundation - Gallery Vilnius, Lithuania in 2001, Temples Malta - N. Foundation - Californian Institute of Integral Studies, San Francisco, USA in 2000, The Scottish Rites Temple, Oakland, and the Bade Gallery University of California, Berkeley, USA in 2000. Sacred Journeys - DEA Foundation - Matthew Gallery, Edinburgh Arts Festival, Scotland in 1999 among many others.
