= Renata Lucas =

Brazilian artist (born 1971)

Renata Lucas (born 1971) is a Brazilian artist.

She was born in Ribeirão Preto. Lucas received a BFA and MFA from the University of Campinas and a PhD from the University of São Paulo. In 2001, in partnership with a group of artists, she opened a gallery "10.20 x 3.60" where she held her first solo exhibition. She lives and works in São Paulo.

Her work has been exhibited at the Tate Modern in London, at the 2006 São Paulo Art Biennial, at the Institute of Contemporary Art, Boston, at the 2008 Biennale of Sydney and at the Venice Biennale in 2009.

In 2009, she received the art award from the Ernst Schering Foundation in cooperation with the Kunst-Werke Institute for Contemporary Art. Also in 2009, she received The_Dena_Foundation_Art_Award. Lucas received the PIPA Prize in 2010. In 2011, she was given a residency at the Gasworks Gallery in London.

Her work is included in the collections of the Museu de Arte de Ribeirão Preto, the Museu de Arte Contemporânea do Paraná, the Museu de Arte Moderna Aloísio Magalhães, the Museum of Modern Art, Rio de Janeiro, the Barcelona Museum of Contemporary Art, the Zabludowicz Collection and the Fundación Botín.
