= Luca Pozzi =

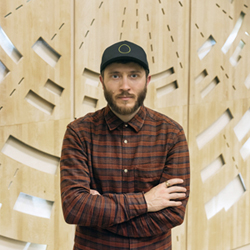
Luca Pozzi at CERN (Main Auditorium) During the "Blazing Quasi-Stellar" Lecture Performance, 2017.

Luca Pozzi (Milan, 31 January, 1983) is an Italian artist.

Inspired by the worlds of art, physics, multi-messenger cosmology and computer science, after graduating with a degree in painting at the Brera Academy and specializing in computer graphics and systems, he collaborates with visionary scientific communities, including the Loop Quantum Gravity (PI), the Compact Muon Solenoid (CERN) and the Fermi Large Area Telescope (INFN, NASA).

Studying quantum gravity, entanglement, time travel, cosmology, and particle physics, his holistic approach converts the theoretical research in a series of hybrid installations characterized by magnetized sculptures, levitating objects, light drawings and a performative use of photography based on a strange feeling of frozen time and multidimensionality.

His work has been exhibited in major museums and galleries in Italy and abroad, and his pieces are part of public and private collections, including the MART of Rovereto, the MAMbo of Bologna, the MEF of Turin, the Italian Ministry of Foreign Affairs “LA FARNESINA” and the Archive of Spatial Aesthetics and Praxis of New York.

He is known for his photographic series “Supersymmetric Partners”, that shows real jumps in front of the Renaissance paintings by Paolo Veronese, and for the use of electromagnetic levitation technologies in futuristic installations such as the “Schröedinger’s cat through Piero Della Francesca influence" (Museo Marino Marini, 2010), the “9 Churches 9 Columns” (Moscow Biennale, 2011) and “The Star Platform” (Marrakech Biennale, 2012).

In 2013, he presented the "ORACLE" device to draw with light by remotely during DLD - Digital Life Design, at Haus der Kunst, in Munich; In 2015 he published “The Messengers of Gravity” monograph at Museo Ettore Fico, in Turin, including interviews and texts by Hans Ulrich Obrist, Gianluigi Ricuperati, Ute Meta Bauer, Carlo Rovelli and Sabrina Tarasoff.

In 2017 he activated the cross-disciplinary “Blazing Quasi-Stellar Object” project at the European Organization for Nuclear Research (CERN, Geneva) as the third chapter of The Internet Saga curated by Francesco Urbano Ragazzi, and he attended “Documenta 14” as part of the “Eternal Internet Brotherhood community” (Kassel).

In 2018 he creates "The Grandfather Platform" an immersive installation in direct connection with fresco cycle "History of the foundation of Rome" depicted by the Carracci Brothers in 1590, at Palazzo Magnani.

In 2019 he had a lecture performance on the "Art in the era of Quantum Gravity and Multi-Messenger Cosmology" at TEDx Roma.

In 2009 he won the Dena Foundation for Contemporary Art at the Centre International d’accueil et d’échanges de Récollets in Paris and was artist in residence at PROGRAM (Initiative for Art + Architecture collaborations) in Berlin and in 2011 at Mazama, Winthrop (WA), in the United States.

He has been honored with the Ettore Fico Award (Turin, 2012), Premio Icona (Verona, 2010) and the Premio Internazionale Scultura Piemonte in 2006.
