= Grotta dell'Arco =

Cave in Italy

The Grotta dell' Arco is a large, shallow cave on the island of Capri, Italy. It faces east, and is situated about 240 m above sea level, under the cliffs which are south-east of the Castello Barbarossa. The cave is about 85 feet (26 m) in height and may have resulted from the great landslide which occurred at the east of Monte Solaro.
