= Giuliana Setari Carusi =

Giuliana Setari Carusi (Pescara (I), 1947) is an Italian contemporary art collector and a major figure in the international art world. After many years in Brussels, New York and Milan, she currently lives between Paris and Brussels. Together with her husband Tommaso Setari she started in the early 80s collecting contemporary art: their collection is now well known internationally. She is the founding President of the non-profit charity organization Dena Foundation for Contemporary Art.

== Biography ==
After a Baccalaureate in Human Sciences in Pescara (I), Giuliana Setari Carusi studied French literature and sociology at the Sorbonne University in Paris and at the Université Libre de Bruxelles, then English literature and language in London. She graduated and became Professor in Literature and Philosophy in Italy and obtained a master's degree in European Administration Studies from the College of Europe in Bruges.

In 1979, while living in New York, Setari Carusi collaborated with exhibition projects promoting Italian artists in North American institutions such as the Art Gallery of Ontario, Toronto, the Guggenheim Museum, the P.S.1 Contemporary Art Centre and the Metropolitan Museum in New York. Back to Italy, first in Rome in 1989, then in Milan in 1990, she co-founded Zerynthia Association for Contemporary Art, to which she actively collaborated throughout the years.

In 1998, she accompanied Italian artist Vettor Pisani in the creation of the Virginia Art Theatrum (Museum of Catastrophe) in Serre di Rapolano, nearby Siena. A homonymous book edited by Charta was later published. The same year, Michelangelo Pistoletto asked her to become President of Cittadellarte Fondazione Pistoletto in Biella(I), a position that she still holds today. She is particularly involved in Cittadellarte's movement Love Difference.

In 2000, she founded the Dena Foundation for Contemporary Art for which she serves as president, promoting emerging visual artists on the international scene: she launched a scholarships for young Italian artists at the Omi International Arts Center, in Ghent, New York, and a Residency Program for artists and curators at the Centre International d’Accueil et d’Echanges des Récollets in Paris. The foundation provides an international prize: the Dena Foundation Art Award for socially and politically engaged young artists. Among the activities of the foundation are also the conception and organization of exhibitions, rounds tables and seminaries on crucial contemporary cultural issues.

Setari Carusi has been and is member of several art institutions associations worldwide. She regularly participates in international meetings and conferences to report her experiences as a collector and professional actor of the international art scene.

In 2007, she was nominated by Il Sole 24 ore as one of the 40 Italian ambassadors of Culture in the international art world.

Three major exhibitions have been dedicated to Giuliana and Tommaso Setari's art collection: Corpus Delicti a dialogue North-South at Städelicke Museum of Ghent in Belgium in 1995, Retour à l’intime, la collection Giuliana et Tommaso Setari at the Maison Rouge foundation Antoine de Galbert/Paris in 2012 and "Intime Conviction, oeuvres de la collection de Giuliana et Tommaso Setari" at Château de Villeneuve – Fondation Emile Hugues, Vence, in 2014.

== Publications ==
The True Story of Monsieur E. or the importance of being silent, Cittadellarte Edizioni and The Dena Foundation for Contemporary Art, 2010
