= Zerio =

Hamlet in Álava

- Concejo
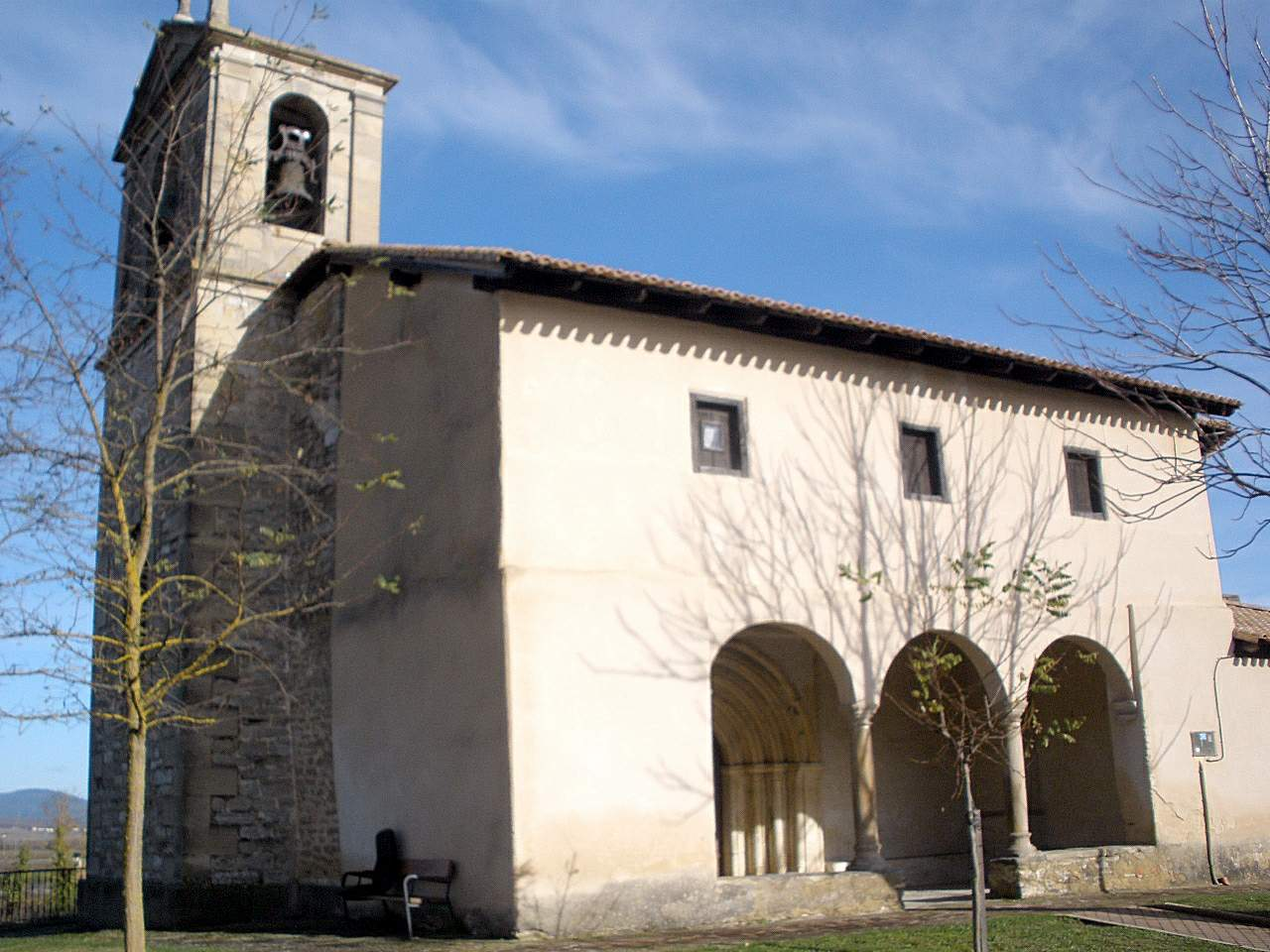
- Church of Santiago Apóstol

- Coat of arms

- Location within Álava Location within the Basque Country Location within Spain
- Coordinates: 42°51′12″N 2°35′27″W
- Country: Spain
- Autonomous community: Basque Country
- Province: Álava
- Comarca: Vitoria-Gasteiz
- Municipality: Vitoria-Gasteiz

Area
  - Total: 1.72 km^{2} (0.66 sq mi)
- Elevation: 535 m (1,755 ft)

Population (2022)
  - Total: 43
  - Density: 25/km^{2} (65/sq mi)
- Postal code: 01192

Zerio (Spanish: Cerio) is a hamlet and concejo located in the municipality of Vitoria-Gasteiz, in Álava province, Basque Country, Spain.
