= Villa San Michele =

House in Capri, Italy

Coordinates: 40°33′26″N 14°13′30″E

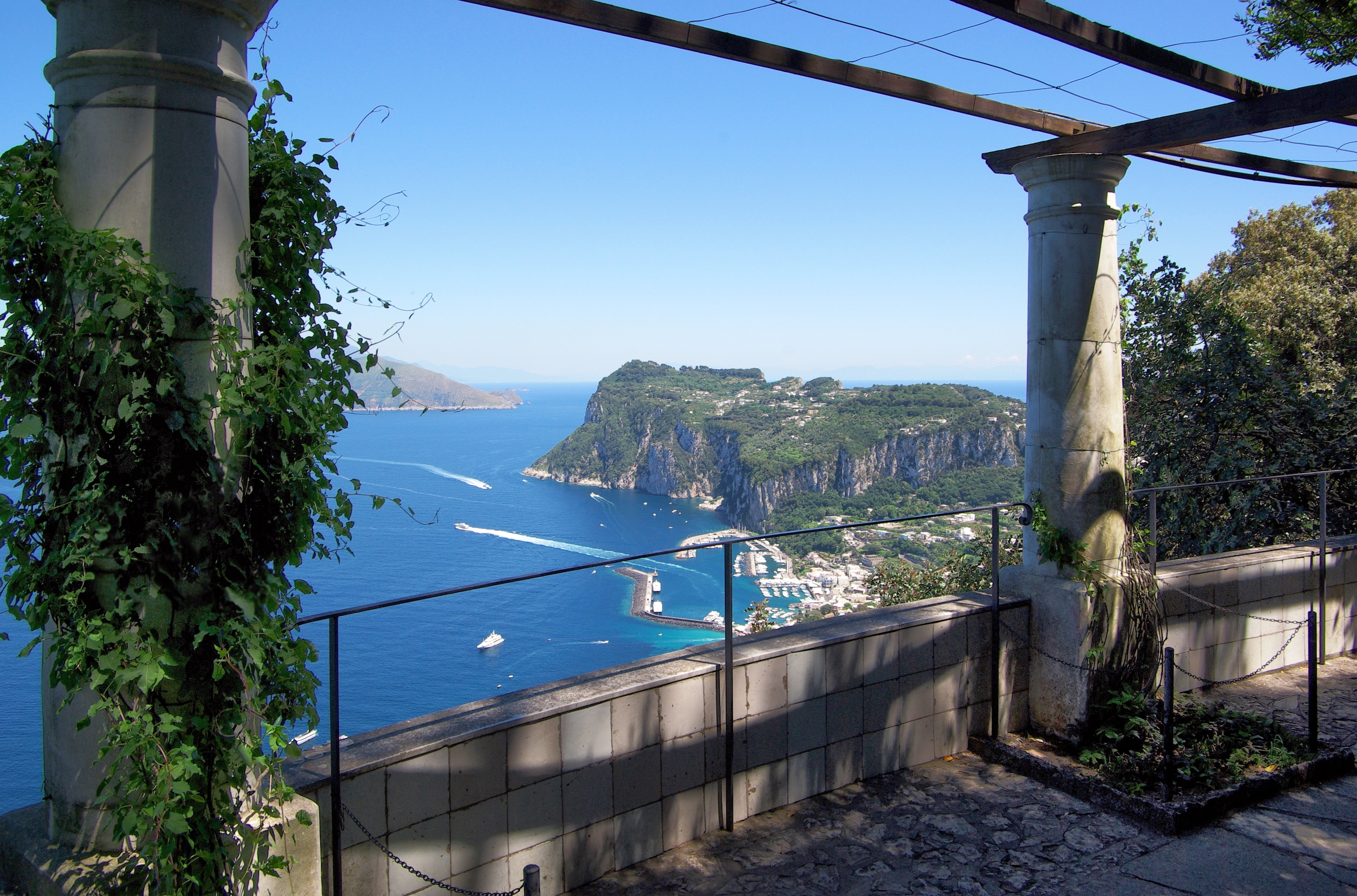
Looking east from Villa San Michele towards Capri harbor (Marina Grande)

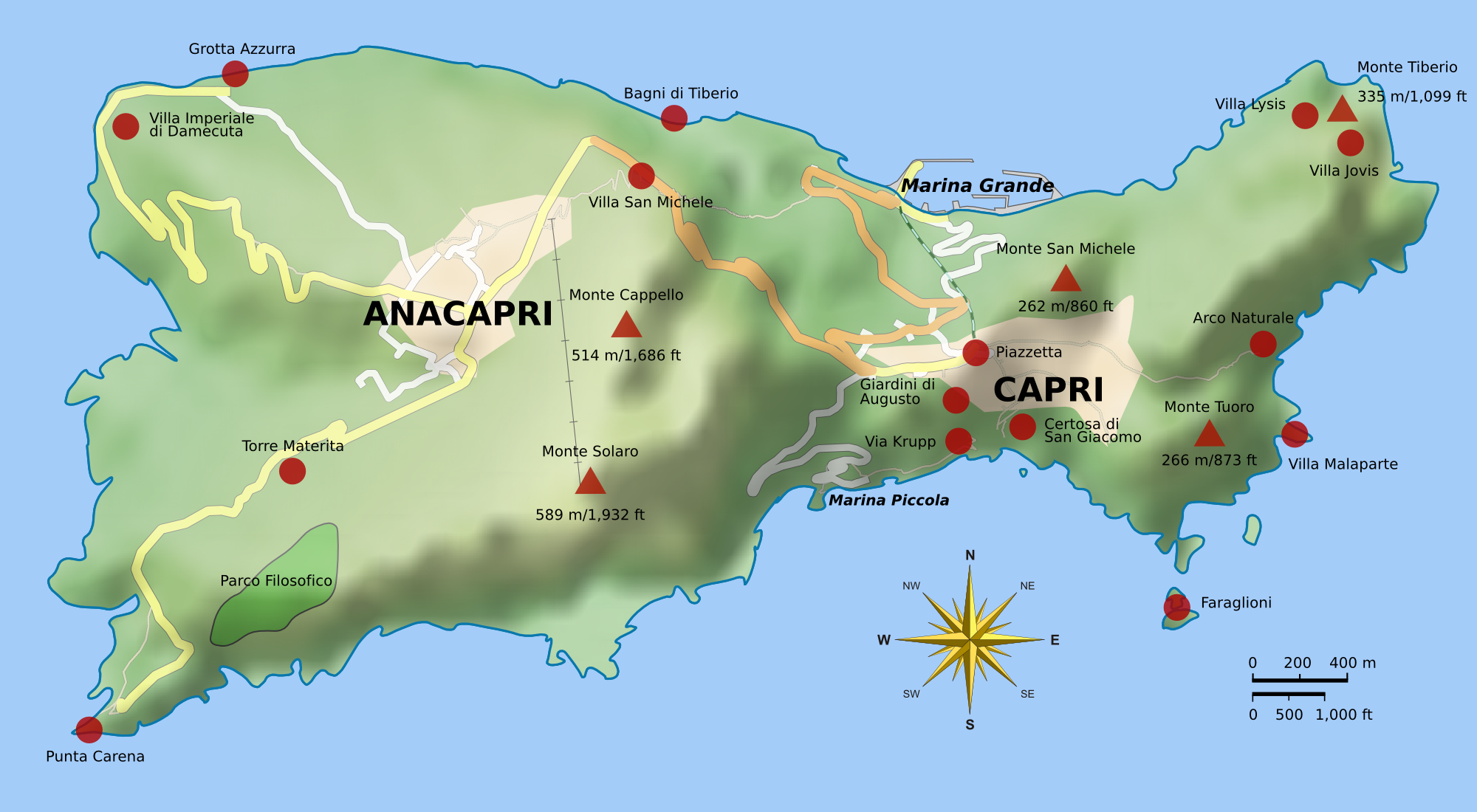
Map of Capri with Villa San Michele shown north-east of Anacapri

The Villa San Michele was built about the end of the 19th century on the isle of Capri, Italy, by the Swedish physician and author Axel Munthe.

== Description ==
The villa's gardens have panoramic views of the town of Capri and its harbour, the Sorrentine Peninsula, and Mount Vesuvius. The villa sits on a ledge at the top of the Phoenician Steps, between Anacapri and Capri, at a height of 327 metres (1,073 ft) above sea level.

San Michele's gardens are adorned with many relics and works of art dating from ancient Egypt and other periods of classical antiquity. They now form part of the Grandi Giardini Italiani.

In his later years, Axel Munthe wrote his youthful memoir The Story of San Michele, which describes how he first visited the island and built the villa, decorated with the remains of palaces built by the Ancient Romans which he found on his land. This colourfully written book was first published in 1929 and became an immediate worldwide success, being translated into many languages. It has been reprinted many times since then.

Between 1919 and 1920, Munthe was an unwilling landlord to the outrageous socialite and muse Luisa Casati, who took possession of Villa San Michele. This was described by the Scottish author Compton Mackenzie in his diaries.

After the death of Munthe, the villa was donated to the Swedish state. Capri Bird Observatory, a Swedish-Italian bird observatory, operates on land belonging to the estate.

== Gallery ==
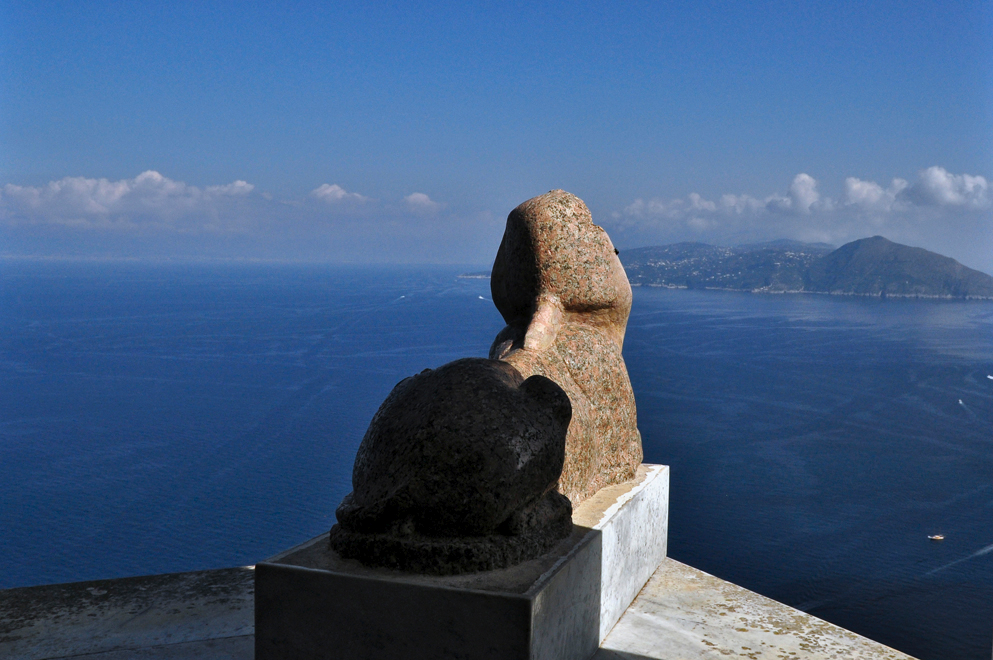
Sphinx

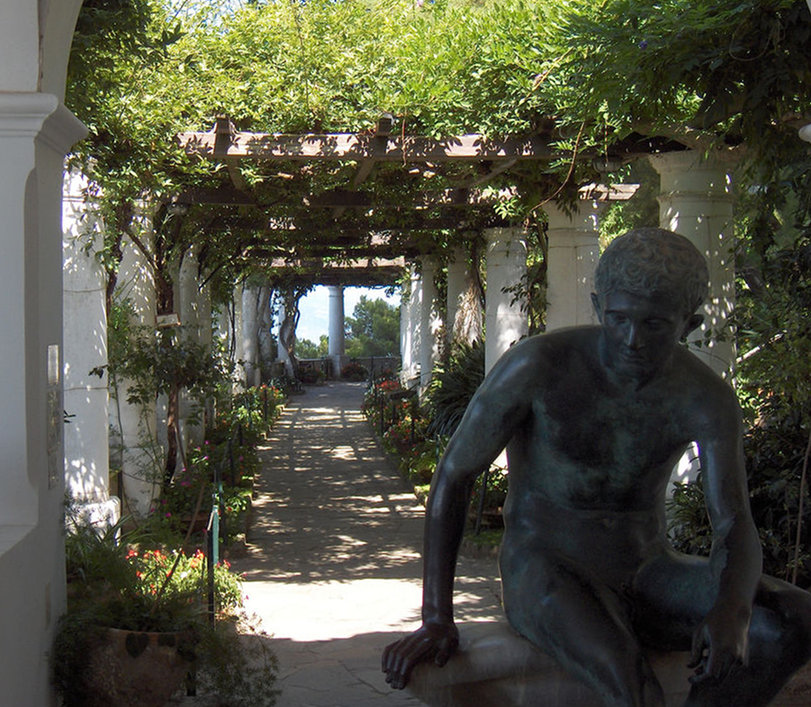
Pergola with Roman statue

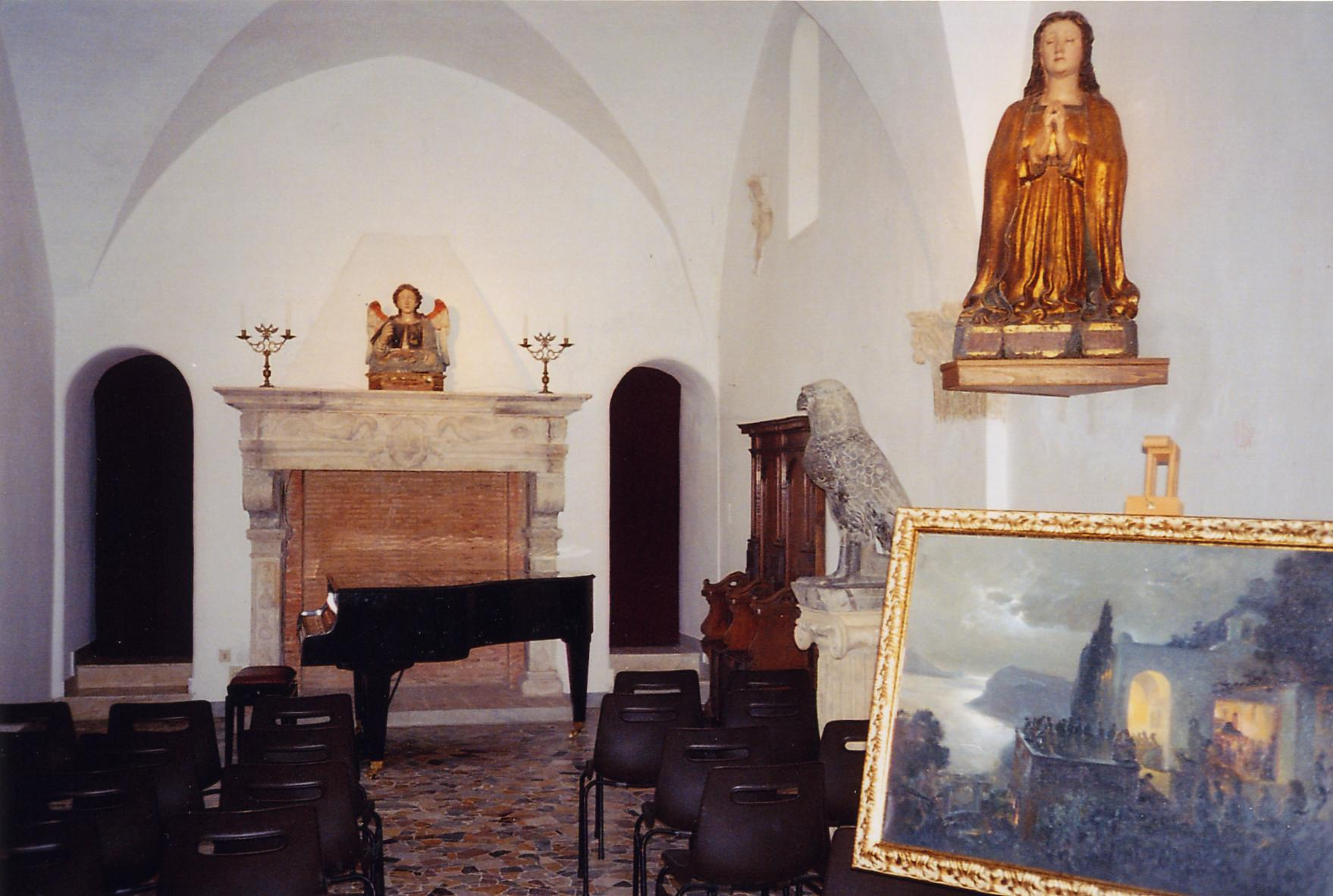
Chapel

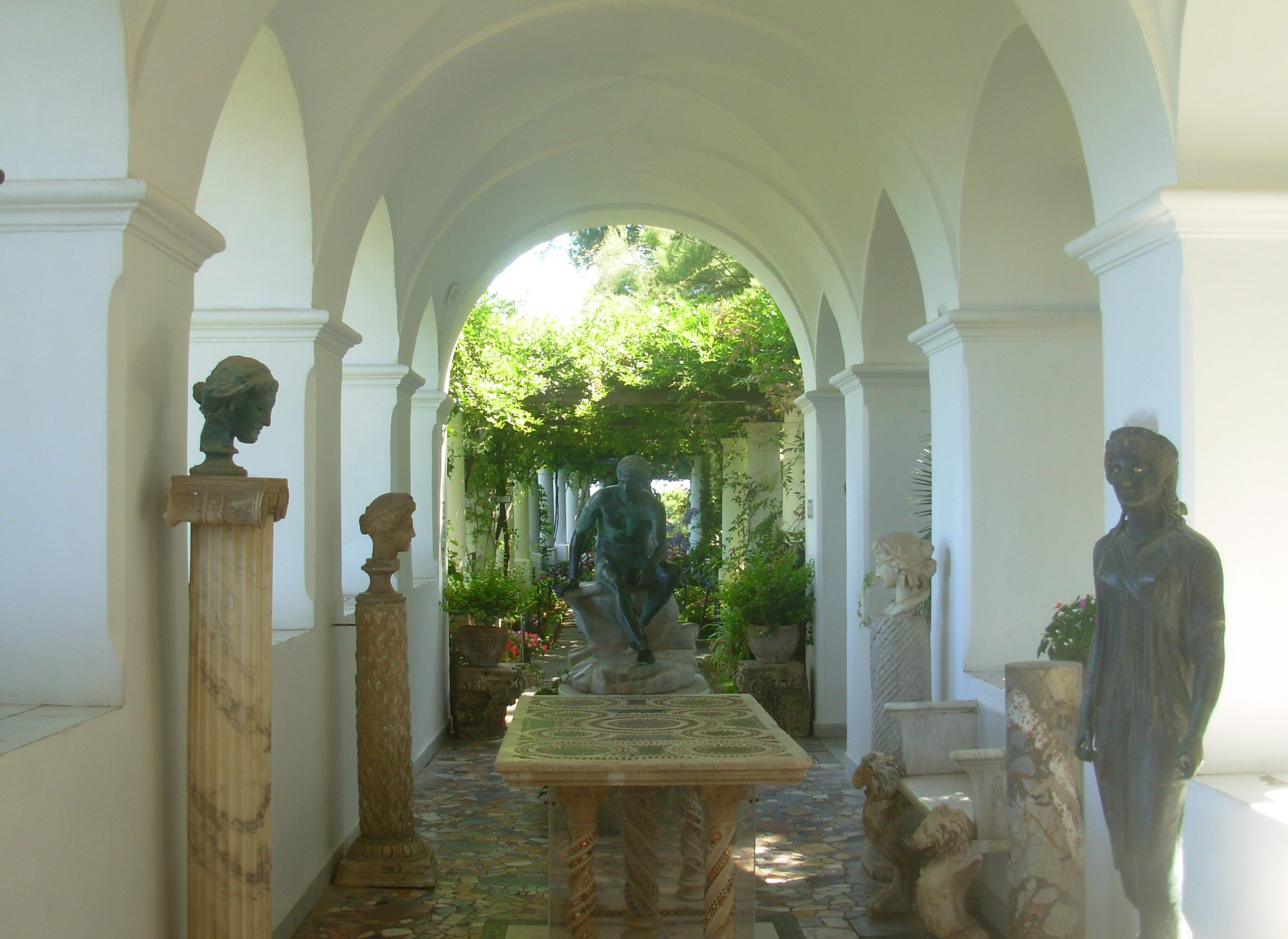
Loggia with statues

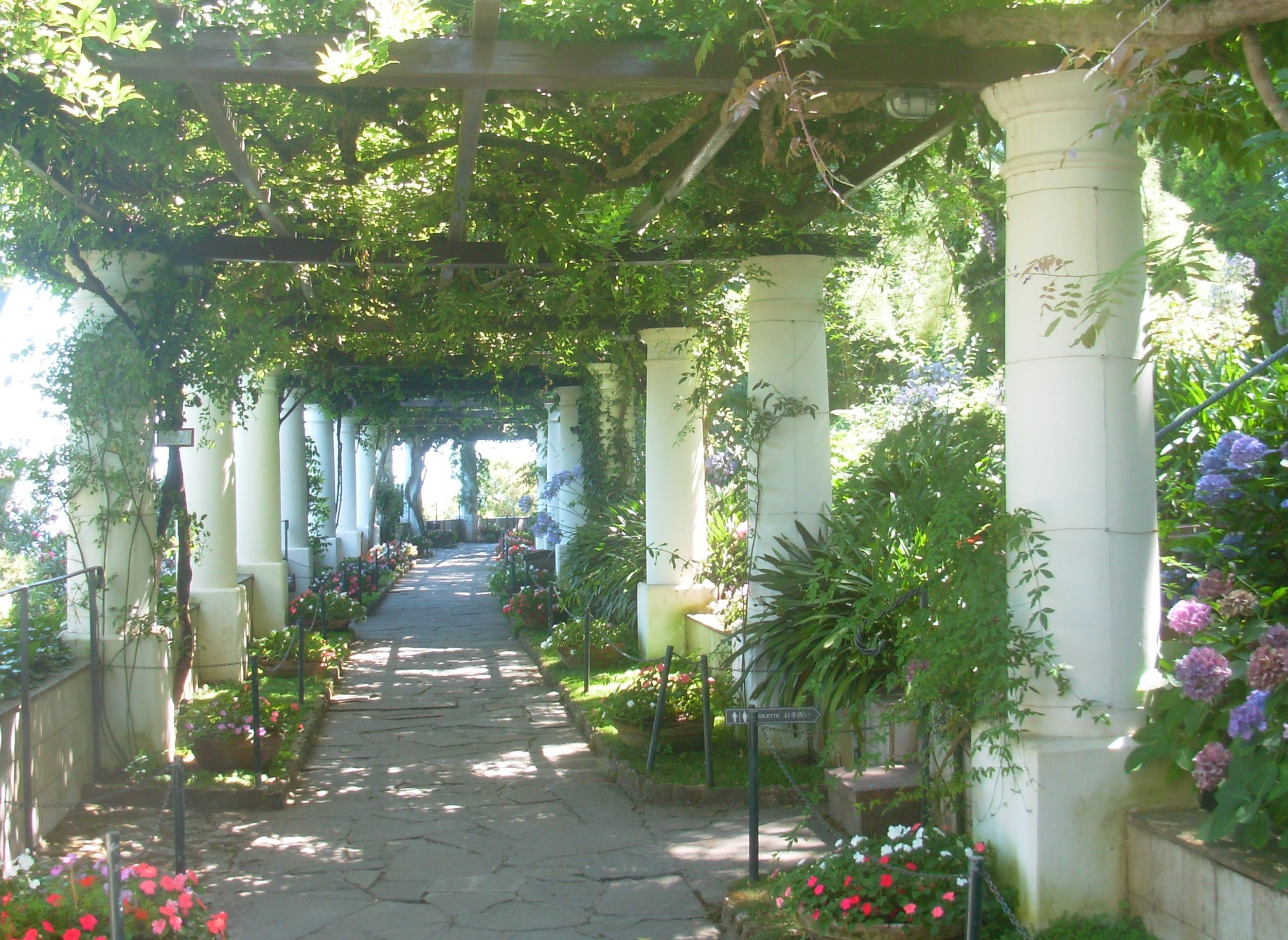
Pergola

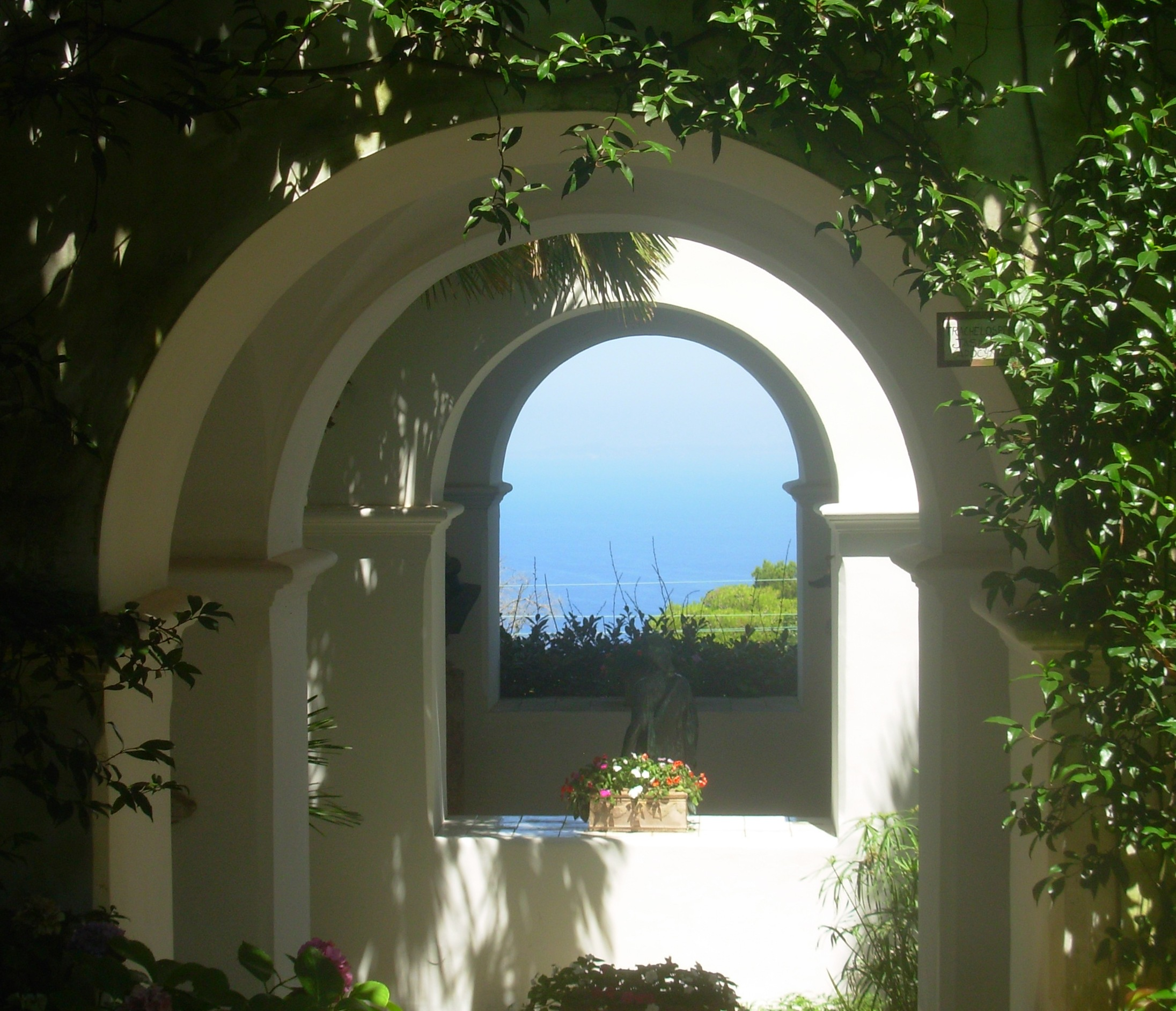
View of the sea from Villa San Michele
