= Stefano Cerio =

Italian photographer and video artist

Stefano Cerio is an Italian photographer and video artist. He is known for photographing deserted amusement parks. He has exhibited his photographic collections both in solo shows and group exhibitions.

== Life and work ==
Stefano Cerio was born in Italy.

His book Aqua Park (2010) shows empty waterparks. Vice Versa (2013) shows empty Italian tourist places. Chinese Fun (2015) shows theme parks in Beijing, Shanghai, Qingdao, and Hong Kong while empty of spectators. Night Games (2017) shows recreational and amusement spaces such as cruise ships, amusement parks, and ski resorts, after they have closed for the night. In 2019 he produced L'Aquila, consisting of inflatable structures located in the L'Aquila area.

Wired has commented that his work largely focuses on “lonely artificial environments”. Business Insider wrote of his work that, “Five major themes recur in Cerio's work: representation, illusion, vision, expectations, and reality.”

== Publications ==
- Aqua Park (2010)
- Vice Versa (2013)
- Chinese Fun (2015)
- Night Games (2017)
- L'Aquila (2019)

== Exhibitions ==
- Chinese Fun, Fondazione Volume!, Rome, 2015; Villa Pignatelli, Naples, 2018
- Night Ski, Villa Pignatelli, Naples, 2018
- MAXXI L'Aquila (an outpost of MAXXI in Rome), L'Aquila, Italy, 2020
