= Dena Foundation for Contemporary Art =

The Dena Foundation for Contemporary Art (DFCA) is an American non-profit organization that promotes contemporary visual arts and young artists in that field.

DFCA was founded in New York in 2001 by art collector Giuliana Setari Carusi. It has another office in Paris.

== Mission ==
DFCA is dedicated to strengthening the ties and the interactions between Italian culture and that of other countries, with a particular interest in the United States and France. DFCA helps artists living in Italy who participate in the Artists Residency Programs in New York and in Paris.

DFCA creates collaborations between artists, museum directors, directors of research programs and professionals of the art world. It organizes and supports roundtables, conferences, seminars and exhibitions.

DFCA created Dena Foundation Art Award for young artists who have created a work with social relevance for a public space. DFCA supports the publication of artist’s books and art magazines and provides production grants for artist participation in International artistic events.

== Artists and curators Residency Programs ==
DFCA promotes artists in residence programs and provides scholarships for these programs.

=== DFCA Scholarship at the Omi International Arts Center ===
The Art Omi International Artists Residency is a three-week residency program in July for visual artists at the Omi International Arts Center in Ghent, New York. The DFCA program is handled each year by a different critic-in-residence and gathers a group of artists from different countries and nationalities.

In 2001, For this program, DFCA establish a scholarship to an artist from Central Italy or Southern Italy.

Because Omi is close to New York City, DFCA participants benefit from visiting art critics, gallery owners and artists. In the evenings the group gathers for lectures, slide presentations and panel discussions. At the end of the residency, the DFCA artists share their projects with an audience of art professionals.

Previous DFCA residents include: Nicoletta Agostini (2003), Stanislao di Giugno (2005), Matteo Fato (2010), Francesco Jodice (2002), Domenico Mangano (2004), Luana Perilli (2008), Corrado Sassi (2006), Marinella Senatore (2009), Donatella Spaziani (2001)

Since 2011, DFCA has partnered with the MARCA Museum in Catanzaro and the Province of Catanzaro to reward an artist from Calabria. Domenico Cordì was the recipient of the 2011 scholarship.

=== The DFCA Scholarship at the Centre International d'Accueil et d'Echanges des Récollets ===
Since 2003, the DFCA promotes an Artists and curators Residency Program at the Centre International d’Accueil et d’Echanges des Récollets in Paris. The DFCA residency takes place in the fall. The DCPA program gathers a group of artists selected by scientific committees, by invitation only, and is managed by a director.

The DFCA program introduces artists to the French and international art scene. The artists receive advice and feedback from art critics and curators, directors of international institutions, gallery owners, collectors and artists. The artists participate in DCPA activities and round tables or exhibitions.

The DFCA Paris program is supported by public and private partners, principally the city of Milan.

The artists involved in the DFCA Paris program include: Rebecca Agnes (2003), Nicoletta Agostini (2004), Meris Angioletti (2005), Paola Anziché (2008), Lucia Barbagallo (2010), Michele Bazzana (2009), Valerio Berruti (2007) Dafne Boggeri (2004), Alessandro Bulgini (2004), Assila Cherfi (2010), Dafni & Papadatos (2003), Martina della Valle (2007), Cleo Fariselli (2009), Matteo Fato (2011), Michael Fliri (2008), Francesco Fossati, Linda Fregni Nagler (2008), Giovanni Giaretta (2010), Antonella Grieco (2008), Invernomuto (2007), Diego Marcon (2009), Federico Peri (2007), Alessandro Piangiamore (2007), Luca Pozzi (2009), Richard Sympson (2009), Angelo Sarleti (2006), Ester Sparatore (2004), Donatella Spaziani (2003), Alberto Tadiello (2008), Alice Tomaselli (2010), Coniglio Viola (2008)

DFCA has established a three-year agreement for the Premio d’Artista of the Fondazione Sparkasse in Bolzano, Italy initiated by Fondazione Museion. The artists selected were Michael Fliri (2008) and Ignaz Cassar (2010)

In 2011, the NAC-National Arts Council of Singapore ask DFCA to establish a partnership aimed at promoting emerging Singaporean artists through a residency in Paris: Hafiz B Osman and Debbie Ding are the 2012 grant recipients.

== Partners ==
DFCA has developed partnerships in order to promote its activities. Among them Accademia delle Belle Arti di Brera, Youth Department of the Municipality of Milan, Centre culturel français of Milan, Prime Minister Department of Youth, Ministry for Heritage and Cultural Activities PARC - General Directorate for Quality and Protection, GAI, Accademia Albertina delle Belle Arti in Turin, Museion, Municipality of Turin, Fondazione Spinola Banna per l’Arte, Unicredit Private Banking, Fondazione Sparkasse, Fondazione Cariplo, Free Undo, RAM / Zerynthia Accademia Albertina, Museion and Sparkasse Foundation.

== The DFCA Art Award ==
In 2001 DFCA established the Dena Foundation Art Award, awarded to young artists who have created a socially-relevant project in a public space. The prize is accompanied by the publication of a book conceived by the artist.

DCPA Art Award recipients have been: Ryan Gander (2007), Great Britain, presented by Hans Ulrich Obrist, Renata Lucas (2009), Brazil, presented by Carolyn Christov-Bakargiev, Michael Rakowitz (2003), United States, presented by Carolyn Christov-Bakargiev, Michael Sailstorfer (2005), Germany, presented by Helmut Fridel, Fabien Verschaere (2001), France, presented by Hans Ulrich Obrist, Luca Vitone (2002), Italy, presented by Roberto Pinto.

== Exhibitions and events ==
DFCA promotes contemporary art through round tables, conferences and exhibitions, in different cities in collaboration with European institutions in the context of cultural events. Among the others, the exhibitions Beyond the Dust – Artists’ Documents Today (2010–2011), Inhabituel (2005), the round table Ubiquity as a paradigm of contemporary culture and life (2004), the conference Jeune photographie italienne contemporaine: une géographie des talents naissants (2008), the Journées Portes Ouvertes at the Centre International d’Accueil et d’Echanges des Récollets (2009–2011)

== Special projects ==
Top 100 by Davide Bertocchi since 2003.

== See also ==
- Giuliana Setari Carusi
