= Ornis Svecica =

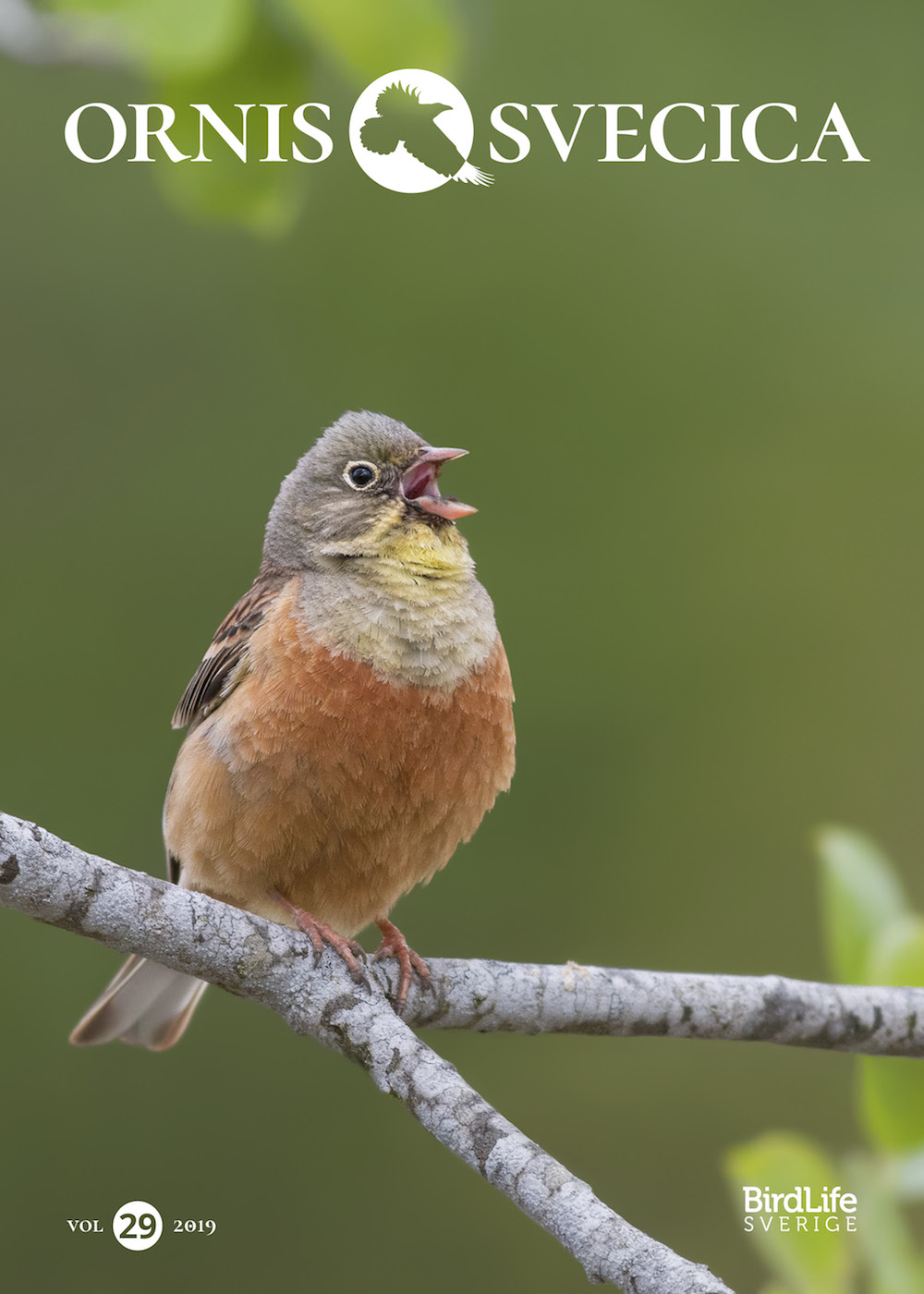
- Discipline: Ornithology
- Language: English, Swedish
- Edited by: Jonas Waldenström

Publication details
- History: 1991–present
- Publisher: BirdLife Sverige (Sweden)
- Frequency: Continuous
- Open access: Yes
- License: CC BY 4.0

Standard abbreviations
- ISO 4: Ornis Svec.

Indexing
- ISSN: 1102-6812 (print); 2003-2633 (web)
- OCLC no.: 635671070

Links
- Journal homepage; Online access; Online archive

Ornis Svecica is a peer-reviewed scientific journal covering all aspects of ornithology. It was established in 1991 and is published by BirdLife Sverige. Sören Svensson (Lund University) was editor-in-chief 1991–2019, succeeded by Jonas Waldenström (Linnaeus University) in 2020. Until 2018 the journal appeared in print, after that it is published online only. The journal originally focused on Swedish birds and Swedish ornithology, but soon changed to primarily deal with the European bird fauna, and the current geographic scope is global. Articles are published in English or Swedish, with an extensive summary in the other language.

The journal was published quarterly until 2018, but as an online journal publication is now continuous.

== Abstracting and indexing ==
The journal is abstracted and indexed in:

- Aquatic Sciences and Fisheries Abstracts
- Biological Abstracts
- BIOSIS Previews
- GEOBASE
- ProQuest databases
- Scopus
- The Zoological Record
