= Claretta Cerio =

Italian writer (1927–2019)

- Born: 22 April 1927
- Died: 26 August 2019 (aged 92)
- Occupation: writer

Claretta Cerio (née Wiedermann; 22 April 1927 – 26 August 2019) was an Italian writer and the second wife of the writer Edwin Cerio (1875–1960).

== Life ==
Clario was born on 22 April 1927 in Capri. Her life and work revolved around the island of Capri. Her grandfather, the painter August Weber from Munich, had settled on Capri around 1880, married a Caprese woman and opened a boarding house. Claretta's German-Italian mother married a German from Sylt. In her memoirs "Mit Bedenken versetzt" ("Moved with misgivings"), Claretta Cerio described her childhood between the two islands of Capri and Sylt and her attendance at the German school in Rome during the Second World War.

After graduating from high school, Cerio studied philology at the University of Naples and wrote her doctoral thesis on the subject of "Capri in German literature". Her encounter with Edwin Cerio was decisive for her career. Cerio, author of numerous books on the history of Capri and its temporary mayor, was at the center of the island's artistic life. The two married in 1953. Claretta described the international art scene on Capri in various books. She also wrote novels, crime stories and texts for photo books about the island. Most of her books were written in German.

Claretta Cerio had lived in Tuscany since 1970. She died on August 26, 2019.

== Works ==
- Capri. Together with Yvonne Meyer-Lohr and Umberto D'Aniello (photographer), Prestel Verlag Munich 2007, ISBN 978-3-7913-3864-4
- Sehnsucht nach Capri. Orbis Verlag, Munich 2000.
- In the light of Tuscany. Harenberg Verlag Dortmund 1992
- Der Nanno stirbt und andere Kriminalgeschichten. Rowohlt, Reinbek near Hamburg 1984, ISBN 3-499-42663-3.
- Arietta di Capri. Stories. Brockhaus, Wiesbaden 1981, ISBN 3-7653-0323-2.
- Mit Bedenken versetzt. Autobiography. Schneekluth, Munich 1981, ISBN 3-7951-0648-6.
- Blood in Chianti. Crime stories. Rowohlt, Reinbek near Hamburg 1979, ISBN 3-499-42493-2.
- Rome and your love. Novel. Schneekluth, Munich 1977, ISBN 3-7951-3010-7.
- Einen heissen Sommer lang. Novel. Schneekluth, Munich 1974, ISBN 3-7951-0270-7.
- Chrysanthemen auf Capri. Crime novel. Schneekluth, Munich 1970, ISBN 3-7951-0202-2.
- My Capri. Mareverlag, Hamburg 2010
