= Phoenician Steps =

Stone stairway connecting Capri and Anacapri, in Italy

Coordinates: 40°33′23″N 14°13′41″E

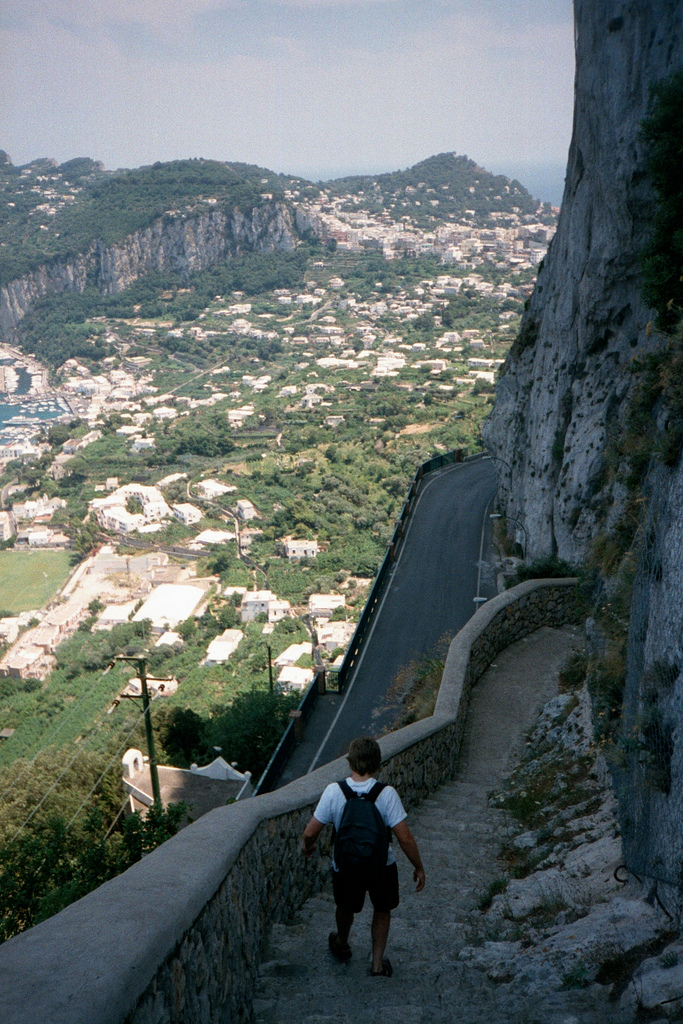
Looking down the steps with the town of Capri in the background

The Phoenician Steps (La Scala Fenicia) of Capri is a long and steep stone stairway that unites the population center of Capri with that of Anacapri. The stairway was made probably by ancient Greek colonists, however, rather than by Phoenicians.

Before the completion of a road, the Steps formed the only means of reaching Anacapri, which is located hundreds of feet above the Mediterranean Sea (the prefix ana- in the name of the place comes from classical Greek and signifies "above").

The upper terminal of the Phoenician Steps lies near the Villa San Michele, which Axel Munthe built at Anacapri.
