= Axel Munthe =

Swedish doctor and psychiatrist

Axel Martin Fredrik Munthe
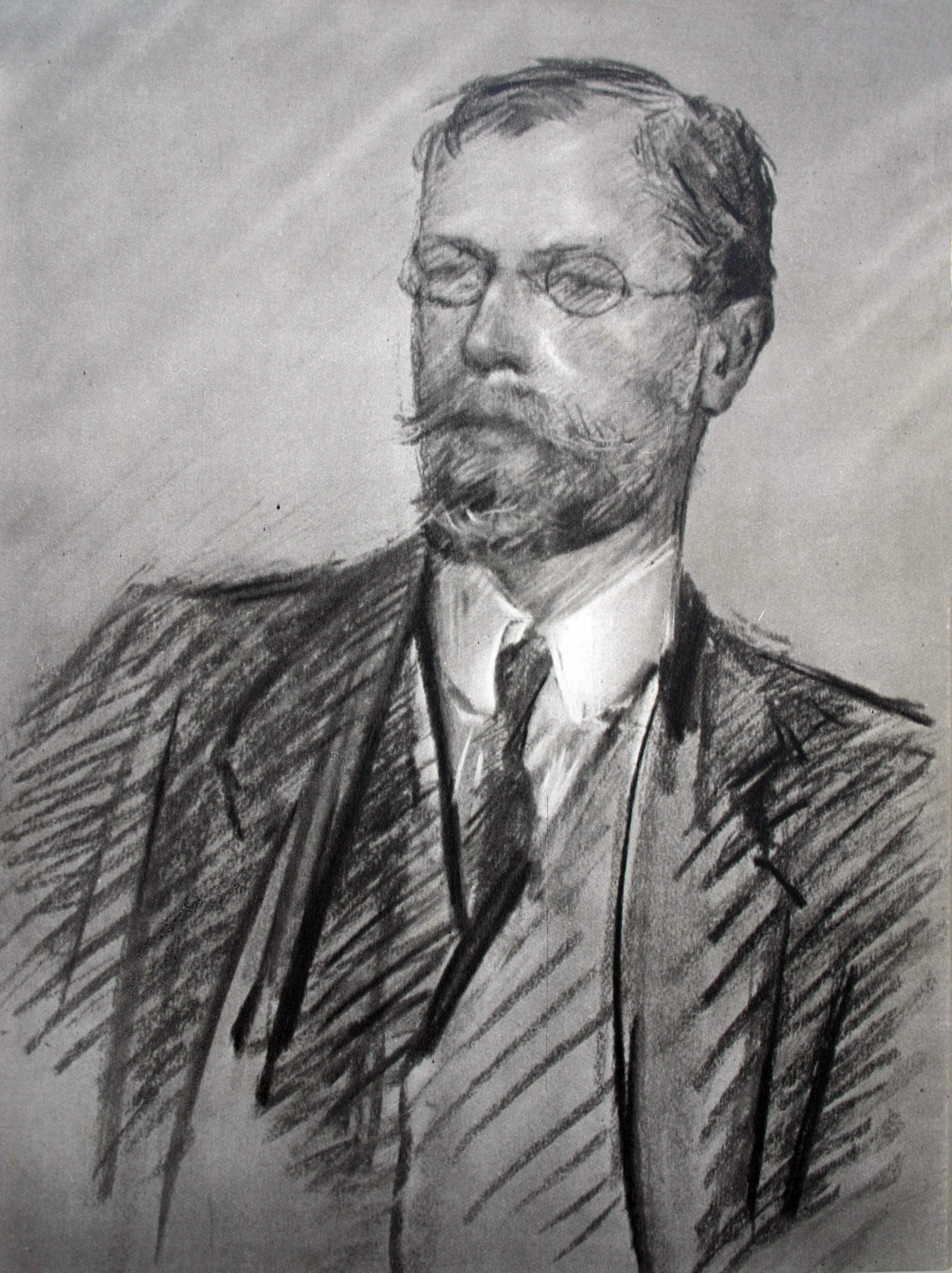
- Axel Munthe, by Feodora Gleichen
- Born: 31 October 1857; Oskarshamn, Sweden
- Died: 11 February 1949 (aged 91); Stockholm, Sweden
- Education: Uppsala University
- Occupations: Physician, psychiatrist, author
- Known for: The Story of San Michele
- Spouse(s): Ultima Hornberg; Hilda Pennington-Mellor
- Children: 2
- Awards: Honorary Commander of the Royal Victorian Order

Axel Martin Fredrik Munthe (31 October 1857 – 11 February 1949) was a Swedish-born physician and psychiatrist, best known as the author of The Story of San Michele, an autobiographical account of his life and work. He spoke several languages (Swedish, English, French, Italian fluently, and German at least passably), grew up in Sweden, attended medical school there, then studied medicine in Paris and opened his first practice in France. He was married to a wealthy Englishwoman and spent most of his adult life in Italy.

His philanthropic nature often led him to treat the poor without charge, and he risked his life on several occasions to offer medical help in times of war, disaster or plague. As an advocate of animal rights, he purchased land to create a bird sanctuary near his home in Italy, argued for bans on painful traps, and himself kept pets as diverse as an owl and a baboon, as well as many types of dog. His writing is light-hearted, being primarily memoirs drawn from his real-life experiences, but it is often tinged with sadness or tragedy, and often uses dramatic licence. He primarily wrote about people and their idiosyncrasies, portraying the foibles of both the rich and the poor, but also about animals.

== Early life ==
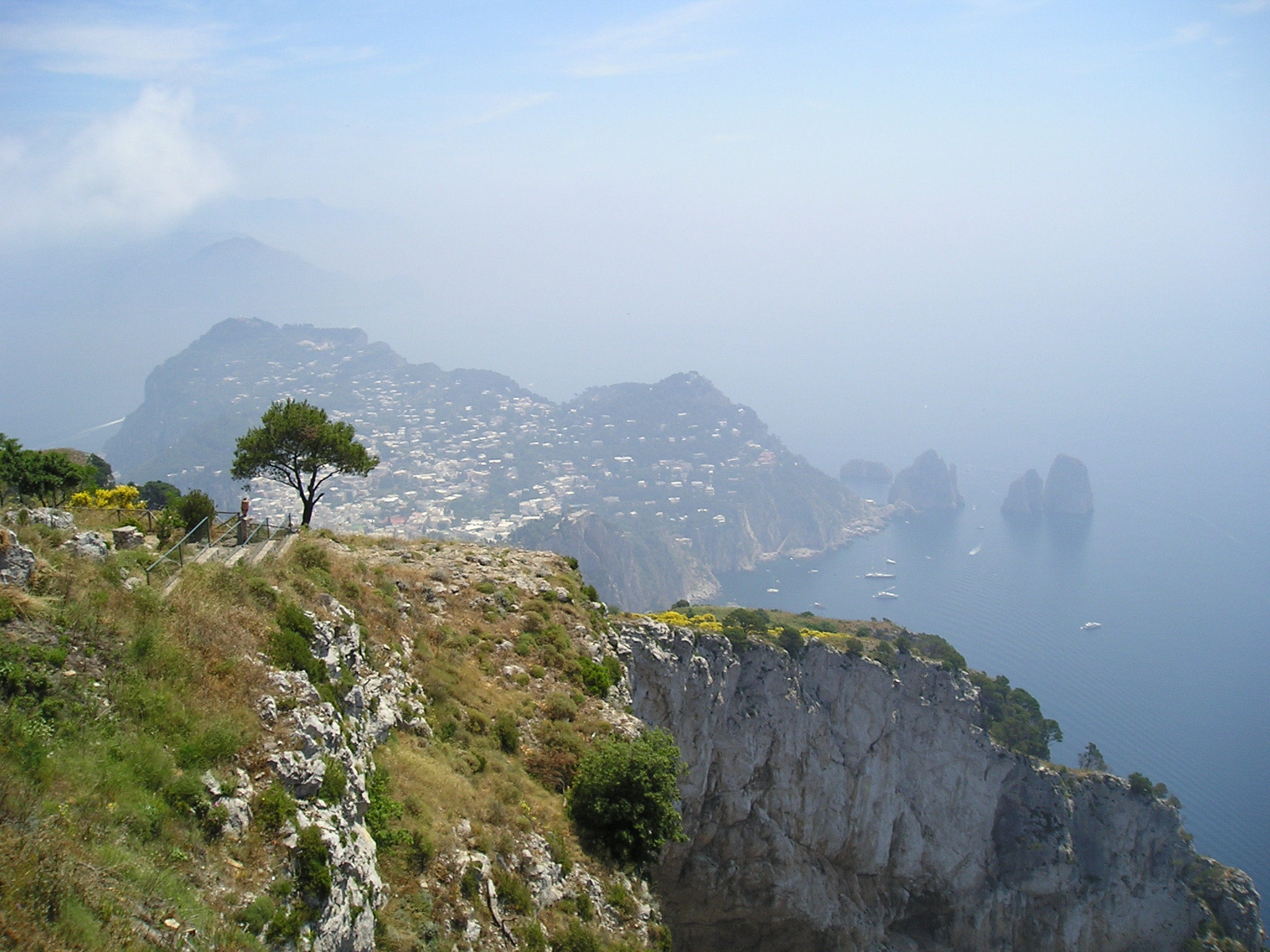
Anacapri, 2004

Axel Munthe was born in Oskarshamn, Sweden, his family's home. His family was originally of Flemish descent, and settled in Sweden during the 16th century.

His parents were Martin Arnold Fredrick Munthe (died 1877) and his second wife Louisa Aurora Ugarph (1819 - 1878). Munthe's mother was the daughter of the attorney Carl August Ugarph and his first wife Johanna Fredrika Meurling The Ugarph family had its roots in Poland.

Munthe's father supported the family through his profession as a chemist and later buying and operating a pharmacy in Vimmerby.

Munthe was the youngest of three siblings, the eldest was Anna (b. 1854) who married twice. At 21 she married the painter Reinhold Norstedt, during which times her flower paintings were exhibited in the National Galleries and other galleries. After Norstedt's death in 1911, she married Frans Siberg, a veterinarian.

The second child was Arnold a future Artist, Author, playwright and Retired Swedish Naval Captain (# - 1927) who served with the French Imperial Fleet produced and wrote several renown plays Magnus Stenbok, Magdalena Rudenskiold and The March over the Belt. Arnold also wrote the several Naval books including Charles XII and the Russian Navy and the textbooks Swedish Naval Heroes series.

== Education ==
Munthe was educated in the local school in Vimmerby. As a young boy his grades in subjects such as mathematics were middling but he excelled in other subjects such as history, geography and Swedish.

As the school did not offer education beyond the fourth grade it was decided in 1868 that the family should move to Stockholm where there were more educational opportunities. The Munthe brothers were enrolled at the Stockholm Lyceum. Munthe's grades started improving significantly and soon he was at the top of his class.

Munthe then in 1871 continued on to high school at Stockholm Gymnasium from which he graduated in 1874

Munthe began college in 1874 at Uppsala University. While travelling in Italy in 1875, Munthe sailed in a small boat from Sorrento to the island of Capri. Climbing the Phoenician Steps to the village of Anacapri, he came upon a peasant's house and the adjacent ruin of a chapel dedicated to San Michele, and was immediately captivated by the idea of rebuilding the ruin and turning it into a home.

Munthe studied medicine in Uppsala, Montpellier and Paris (where he was a student of Charcot), and graduated as M.D. in 1880 at the age of 23. Though his thesis was on the subjects of gynaecology and obstetrics, Munthe was deeply impressed by Professor Jean-Martin Charcot's pioneering work in neurology, having attended his lectures at the Salpêtrière hospital. He later had a falling out with Charcot, and left the Salpêtrière denouncing his former teacher's work on hypnotism as fraudulent and scientifically unsound.

== Paris and Italy ==
After graduation, Munthe opened a medical practice in Paris, largely catering to the members of the Scandinavian art colony there. He for example rented a Paris apartment to Finnish painter Albert Edelfelt and his wife. In 1884 he travelled to Naples to offer medical assistance in a cholera epidemic.

In 1887, he moved to Capri, bought the Villa San Michele and began restoration, doing much of the work himself, but also employing local residents, including three brothers and their father.

In 1890, running low on money for the project, he opened a practice in Rome which catered to foreign dignitaries as well as the local population. From this point onwards he divided his time between Rome and Capri.

== Queen Victoria of Sweden ==
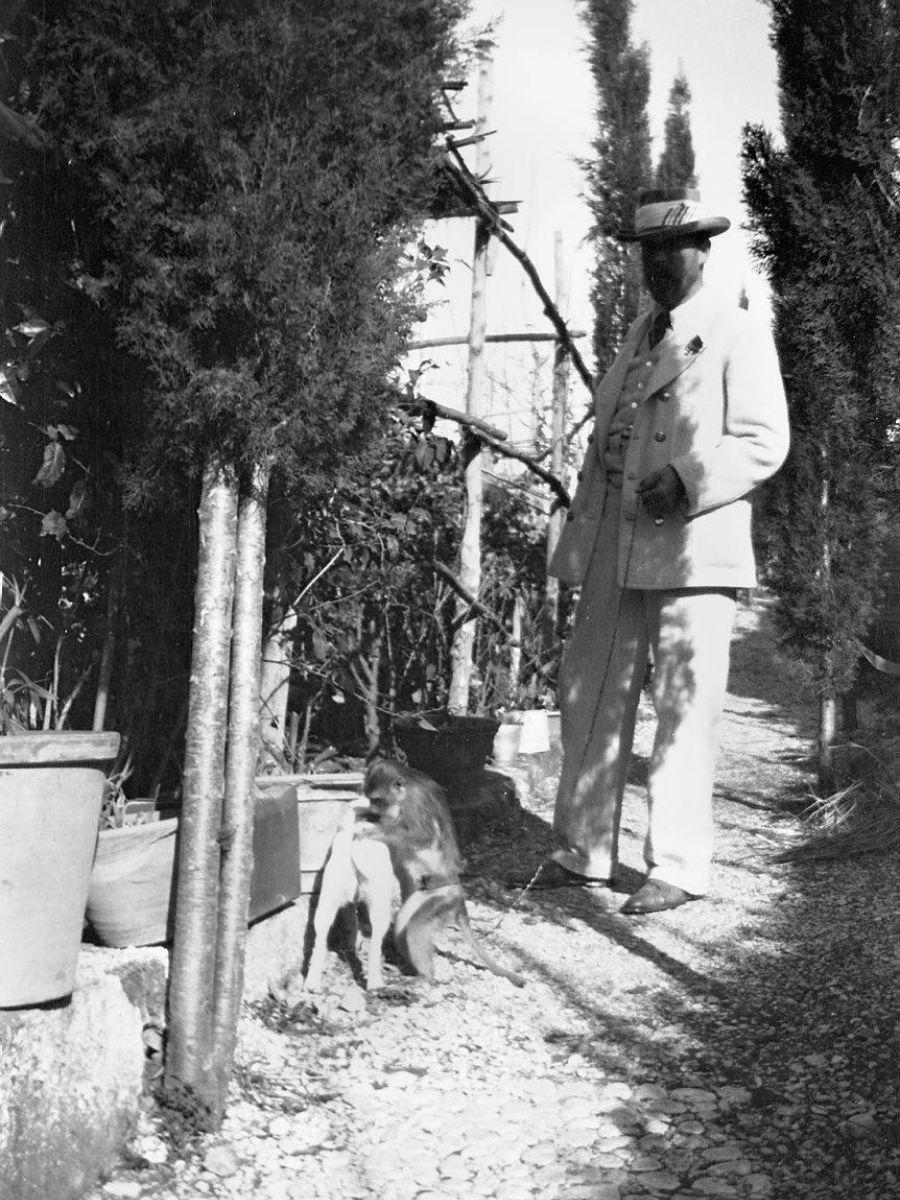
Axel Munthe with his pet monkey and pet dog, photographed by Queen Victoria of Sweden

In 1892, Munthe was appointed physician to the Swedish royal family. In particular, he served as personal physician of the Crown Princess, Victoria of Baden, continuing to do so when she became Queen consort, and until the time of her death in 1930, although this did not mean that he was in constant attendance.

Victoria suffered from severe bronchitis and possibly also tuberculosis. Munthe recommended that she spend her winters on Capri for her health. While initially hesitant, in the autumn of 1910 she travelled to Capri, and from then onwards, except during the First World War and for a few years towards the end of her life, she spent several months each year there.

While in residence the Queen often visited the Villa San Michele to join Munthe for morning walks around the island. Munthe and the Queen also arranged evening concerts at San Michele, at which the Queen played the piano. The Queen shared Munthe's love of animals, owning a pet dog herself, and helped support his efforts to purchase Mount Barbarossa to establish it as a bird sanctuary. Perhaps inevitably, given the small local population and their close friendship, it was rumoured that Munthe and the Queen were lovers, but this has never been substantiated.

Young Princess Maria, who by request of King Gustaf V of Sweden twice stayed with her mother-in-law the Queen and Munthe at Capri, found his influence damaging and his powers hypnotic. Years later she asserted that he wanted her to be his patient at age 23 and made physical advances toward her, and that the horror she then felt toward the Swedish royal family, because of their unlimited support of Munthe, was the main reason she fled them and filed for divorce from Prince Wilhelm.

Munthe has been described as less interested in the health of his patients than in his own convenience and fame, and his having Victoria travel to Capri, and stay there for months in that particular climate, has been considered more detrimental than beneficial to her health.

Other indication of his passionate nature concerns an affair he is believed to have had with the English socialite Lady Ottoline Morrell, beginning when they first met in July or August 1898. Ottoline was then an unmarried 25-year-old member of the privileged London social scene, while being at the same time slightly contemptuous of it. Her intellectual and spiritual interests drew her to more mature men, such as H. H. Asquith, particularly if they had a reputation for iconoclasm. She and Axel Munthe were drawn to each other, and managed to spend much private time together on Capri.

== Marriages ==
Axel Munthe married Ultima Hornberg, a Swede, on 24 November 1880, whom he met while she was studying art in Paris. They divorced in the late 1880s, and in 1892 she married a Swedish manufacturer named Gustaf Richter, and gave birth to a son in 1893, before dying in 1895.

In 1907, Munthe married Hilda Pennington-Mellor (1876–1967). They had two sons, Peter and Malcolm.

There is an anecdote that Munthe was discussing The Story of San Michele with his publisher, John Murray, in the garden at Southside, Munthe's house near Wimbledon Common. During this conversation, Murray told him that his ancestor and namesake John Murray (1778–1843) had sat in the same garden with Lord Byron to discuss publication of Byron's works.

During 1910–1911, Munthe had a 14-room summer home built in Sweden as a gift to his wife. It was originally called Stengården (The Stone Court), but has been known as Hildasholm since her death. It is set amongst trees on the shore of Lake Siljan in Dalarna, and the architect was Torben Grut, who also designed the Stockholm Stadium used for the 1912 Summer Olympics. Hilda landscaped the home with an English garden as part of the dramatic rocky surroundings, and furnished it with 17th, 18th and 19th-century art and furniture from Italy, England and France.

The family usually stayed in the house during the summer, but Munthe was more often at the San Michele.

== First World War ==
During the First World War, Munthe became a British citizen and served in the ambulance corps. His wartime experiences were the basis for his book, Red Cross, Iron Cross.

== Later life ==
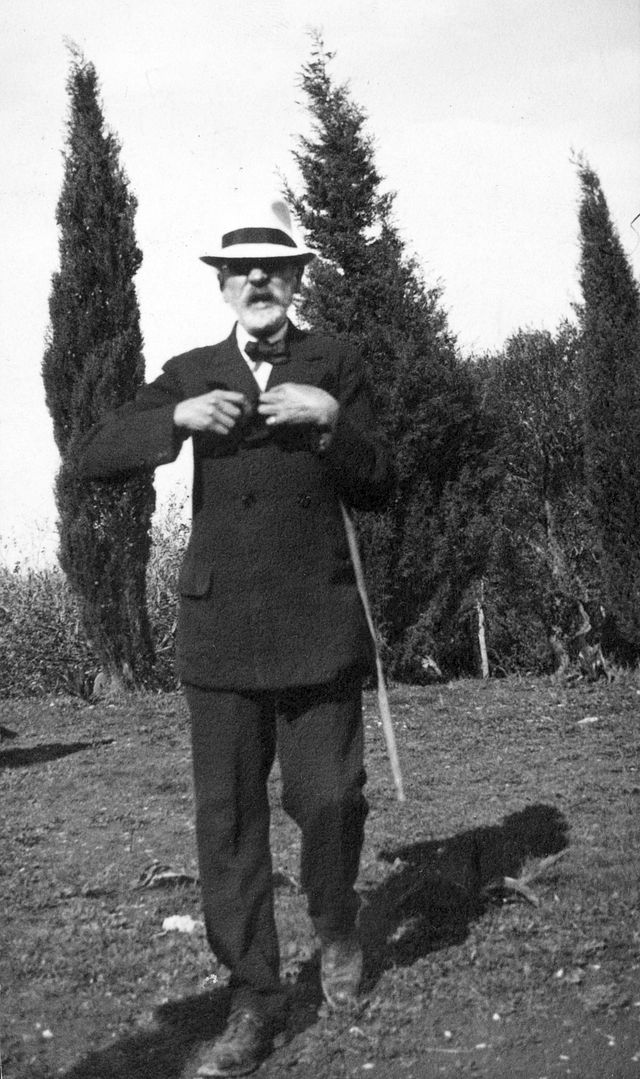
Munthe, early 1930s

In 1919–1920, Munthe was an unwilling landlord to the outrageous socialite and muse Luisa Casati, who took possession of Villa San Michele. This period was described by Scottish author Compton Mackenzie in his diaries.

Munthe developed an eye condition which eventually made him virtually blind and unable to tolerate the bright Italian sunlight. At that point he returned to Sweden for a number of years and wrote The Story of San Michele (published in 1929), which was well received, having been translated into at least 45 languages and said to be one of the best-selling books of the 20th century.

An operation restored his sight, and he spent several more years at San Michele before returning to Sweden in 1942. He spent the final years of his life as an official guest of the King of Sweden.

During the Second World War, Munthe's son Malcolm Pennington Mellor Munthe served with the Special Operations Executive, working behind Nazi lines in occupied Scandinavia, and later participating in the Allied invasion at Anzio. Malcolm Munthe was seriously wounded during the war, and later developed reclusive tendencies.

Munthe died at Stockholm Palace aged 91. His body was cremated and the ashes were scattered into the North Sea. A memorial plaque about him and his family can be found at the Protestant Cemetery in Rome.

== Medical outlook ==
Munthe tried to avoid prescription medication for his psychological cases whenever possible, often recommending hypnosis, music, and other alternative medical approaches. He was peripherally involved in Louis Pasteur's search for a rabies vaccine. He advocated euthanasia for hopeless medical situations such as rabies, where the patient is condemned to a prospect of intense pain and mental anguish.

== Publications ==
The Story of San Michele overshadows all Munthe's other publications, and includes material from some earlier works. His earlier work can be very difficult to find and often commands high prices.

Aside from his doctoral thesis, his first publications consisted of accounts of his travels which appeared in the Stockholms Dagblad newspaper, and which described his experiences of relief work during the cholera epidemic in Naples. These articles were published in 1887 as a book translated into English by Maude Valerie White. The second edition of 1899 was translated by Munthe himself.

Vagaries was first published in London in 1898. It was retitled Memories and Vagaries in a second edition printed in 1908. In 1930 there was a third edition, containing an added preface and a slightly different selection of stories in a different order.

Munthe's reminiscences of his time in the ambulance corps, Red Cross, Iron Cross was published anonymously – "by a doctor in France" – in London in 1916, with all proceeds being donated to the French Red Cross. A second edition, credited to Munthe, was published around 1930.

=== Publications in languages other than English ===
- Små Skizzer, Stockholm, 1888
- Bref och Skizzer, Stockholm, 1909
- Letters From A Mourning City was published in Swedish in 1885, and in Italian in 1910.
- Memories and Vagaries seems to have very different titles in other languages, often roughly translating as An Old Book of Man and Beasts; see that article for more information.

== Legacy ==
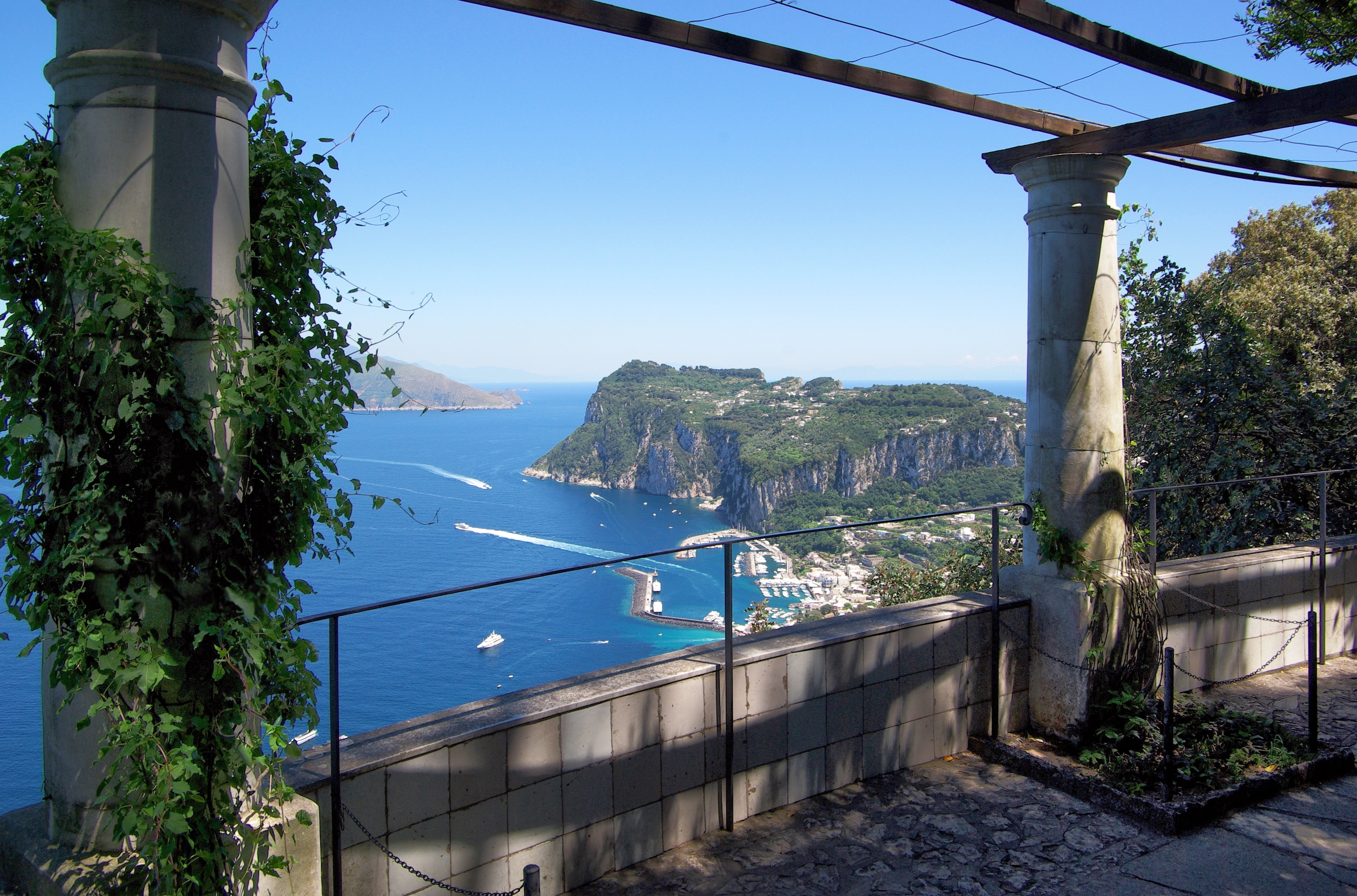
Capri harbour, from rotunda, Villa San Michele

Munthe died in 1949 aged 91, in Stockholm. Several of his properties are now museums and cultural centres. He willed Villa San Michele to the Swedish nation, and it is maintained by a Swedish foundation. The complex functions as a cultural centre, hosting concerts, visiting Swedish scholars, and the local Swedish consulate. The foundation also maintains the Mount Barbarossa bird sanctuary, which covers over 55,000 square metres.

In 1980, a foundation (Stiftelsen Hildasholm) was established to care for Hildasholm, the Munthes' Swedish home. Malcolm Munthe donated the home and the art and antiques it contains to the foundation, which operates it as a museum. It was designated a historic building in 1988, and underwent extensive restoration between 1995 and 1999. In addition to tours, the museum hosts art classes and concerts.

Malcolm Munthe spent much of his life after the Second World War remodelling the family's two mansions in England. His children formed the Pennington-Mellor-Munthe Charity Trust which maintains both Southside and Hellens Manor and operates them as museums, also hosting cultural events such as concerts, lectures and literary events. Members of the family still sometimes reside at them.

There have been at least two international symposia on Munthe, the second being held at Hildasholm in Leksand, Sweden, on 13 September 2003. Speakers included Dr. Ian McDonald, Levente Erdeos (architect, and former curator of San Michele), the Swedish author Bengt Jangfeldt, Dr. Peter Cottino (from Capri), Mårten Lindståhl, Dr. Katriona Munthe-Lindgren, and Professor Alden Smith from the Department of Classics at Baylor University.

He was the subject of a 1962 biopic Axel Munthe, The Doctor of San Michele, based on his memoirs.

== Awards and decorations ==
- (United Kingdom) Honorary Commander of the Royal Victorian Order

== Films ==
- Axel Munthe, der Arzt von San Michele, directed by Rudolf Jugert, starring O. W. Fischer (as Axel Munthe), 1962.
