= Ignazio Cerio =

Italian physician and writer

Ignazio Cerio (1841 – 1921) was an influential but eccentric physician and amateur philosopher on the island of Capri, in Italy. His father, imprisoned for his liberal beliefs, had spent his time in jail devising chemical concoctions and mechanical constructions that would never be made; Ignazio continued the family traditions of both liberalism and idiosyncratic inventiveness. Ignazio even coined the word disutilità to refer to a human life lacking a sense of purpose but full of tension and reflection, mixing passionate pursuit of ideas with periods of lovesickness and ennui.

He worked for fifty years as a medical doctor on Capri, a profession he followed with his characteristically unconventional flair. On one occasion, for example, he established a sanitorium at Pozzuoli, claiming that the sulphurous gases would cure tuberculosis. The only patient to arrive at the sanitorium rejected the doctor's contention that both sulphur and arsenic would be good for the health.

Nevertheless, he remains a well-remembered and much-loved figure on the island of Capri, his memory immortalised both in the writings of his son, Edwin Cerio (particularly in La vita e la figura di un uomo (1921)) and in the cultural Centro Caprense Ignazio Cerio, established in his name to organise conferences and meetings on medicine, Italian and foreign literature, archaeology, palaeontology, and international and local history.

Palazzo Cerio, close to the Piazzetta, hosts the Ignazio Cerio museum about Capri's natural history.
