= BirdLife Sverige =

Swedish ornithological society

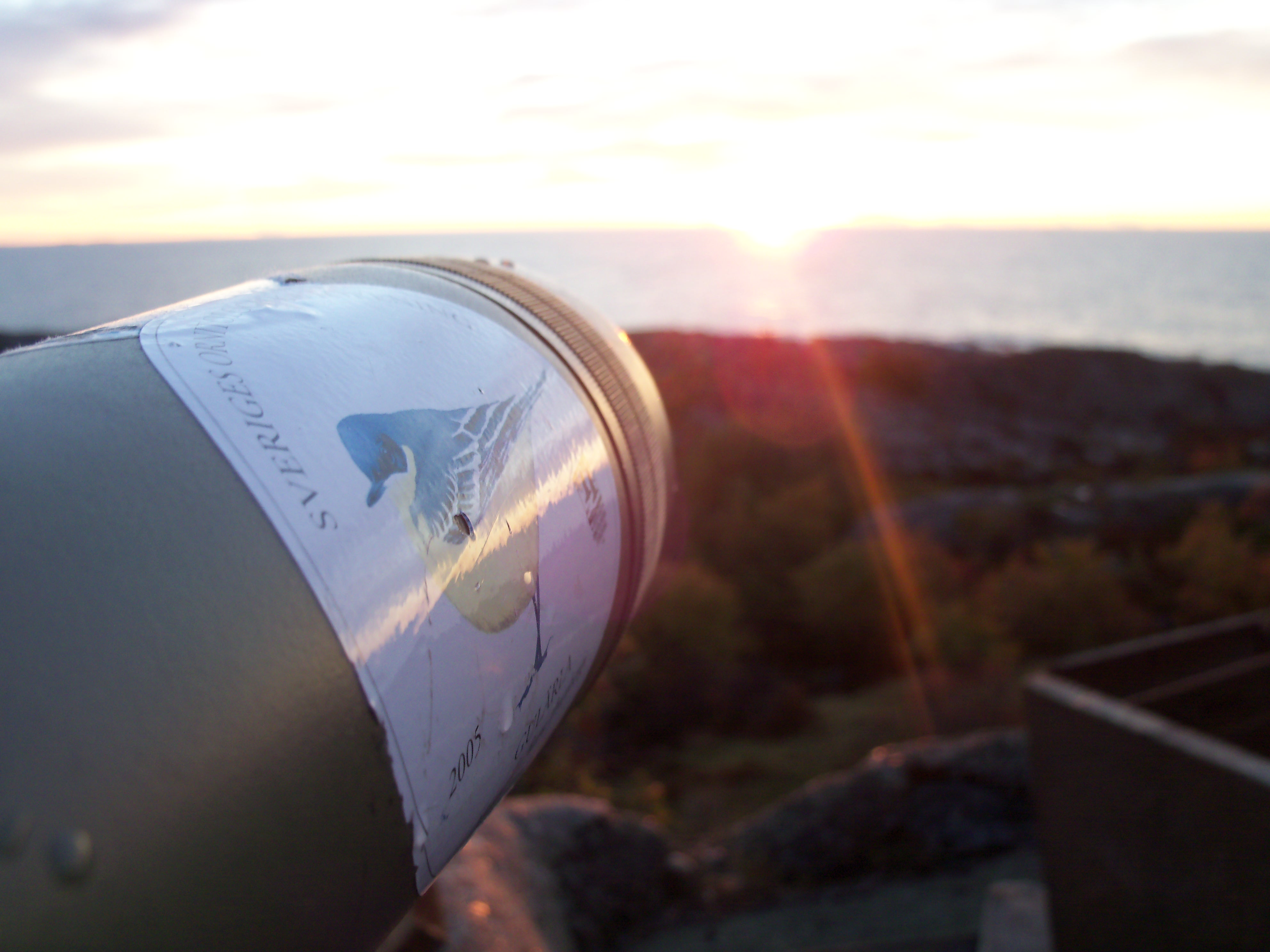
Birdwatching in sunrise, a spotting scope with a sticker from the Swedish Ornithological Society

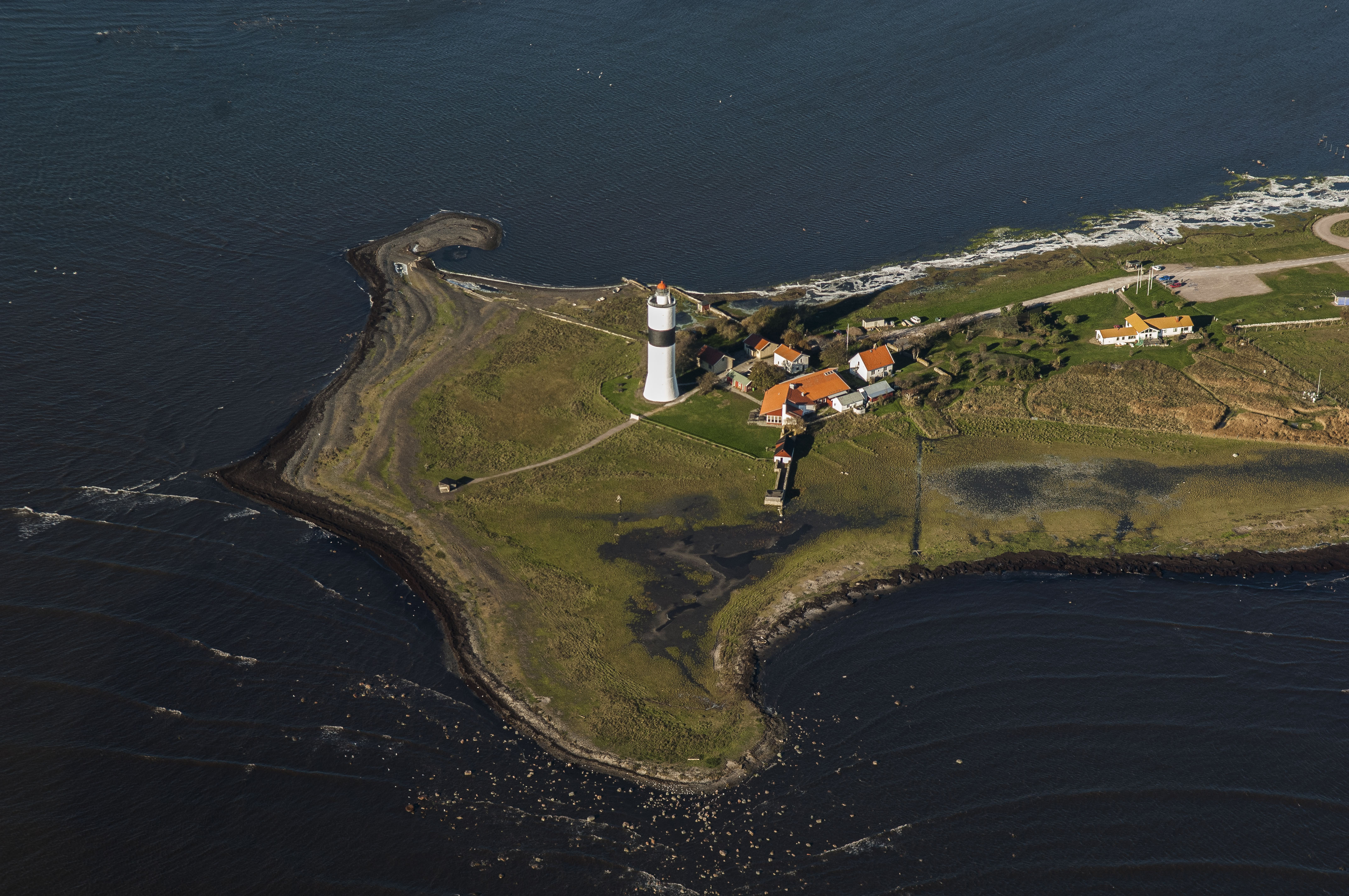
Ottenby Bird Observatory, owned by the SOF at Långe Jan lighthouse on Öland

BirdLife Sverige (known as the Swedish Ornithological Society, Sveriges ornitologiska förening, or SOF before 2014) is a Swedish ornithological society founded in 1945 and a BirdLife partner. It currently has 16,500 members, 24 regional branches, and a staff of 24.

The main three goals of the organization are:

- bird conservation;
- to carry out investigation and documentation;
- to promote interest in birds and birdwatching.

BirdLife Sverige develop an electronic, internet-based bird reporting system called Artportalen, used by thousands of Swedish bird watchers to report sightings.

The organization also publishes three magazines: Vår Fågelvärld, Ornis Svecica and Fågelvännen.
