= Edwin Cerio =

Italian writer and architect (1875–1960)

- Born: 28 June 1875; Capri, Italy
- Died: 24 January 1960 (aged 84)
- Known for: politician, architect, botanist and local historian of Capri
- Political party: Liberal
- Parent: Ignazio Cerio

Edwin Cerio (28 June 1875 – 24 January 1960) was a prominent Italian writer, engineer, architect, historian, and botanist. He was born on the island of Capri to an English artist mother and a well-known local physician, Ignazio Cerio.

== Early life ==
With doctorates in both shipbuilding and mechanical engineering, Cerio initially found employment in Germany with the Krupp dynasty in Kiel, and from 1902 to 1915 designed shipyards and ships throughout Italy, Germany and Argentina. Fluent in six languages, he oversaw the construction and sale of German warships to South America, but with the outbreak of the First World War he became disillusioned, and resigned his post to return to his native island, where he would remain for the rest of his life.

Abandoning his former career as a naval engineer, Cerio began to deal in both horses and property on his native island - where he had already founded and edited a literary magazine (published in three languages) even while he had been working overseas. The magazine (known by its shortened form of "Tra", for Tra il riso e il pianto, or Between laughter and tears) was packed with poems, short stories, and satirical pieces about life in Capri.

== Political career ==
In 1920, as a self-proclaimed Liberal at a time when the Fascists were gaining ground in the rest of Italy, he was elected as Mayor of Capri. Although he held this post for just three years, he made an enormous impact on the way that the island would be governed for the rest of the century. To prevent Milanese property developers from destroying the traditional ambience of Capri, he organised (in 1922) a "conference for the defence of the landscape", whose planning groundrules continue to influence the government of Capri to this day. His passionate opposition to what he called the "sharks" who were building hotels, apartment blocks and department stores was not popular with everyone, however, and in 1923 he was voted out of office.

== Published works ==
For his next projects, Cerio began to catalogue the local flora and fauna, and he published a series of books on the history and wildlife of Capri, including an excellent account of seventeenth century life in Capri nel seicento (1934), alongside other works such as Flora privata di Capri (1939)' and L'ora di Capri (1950). In English, his best-known work is The Masque of Capri (1959), which is currently out of print.

== Cerio and Neruda ==
In 1950, Cerio invited Chilean author Pablo Neruda to stay at one of his villas - a sojourn that was later part-fictionalised in the film Il Postino (1994), although the action of the film was based on the novel Ardiente paciencia by Antonio Skármeta which deals with a later period of Neruda's life (when the poet was living at Isla Negra, in Chile).

== Personal life ==
Cerio was married to Claretta Cerio.
