= Forts of Capri =

- Anacapri, Campania in Italy
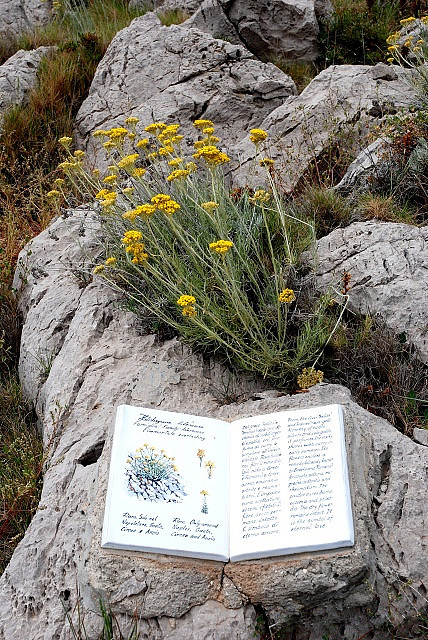
- A tile installed near one of the four forts

Site information
- Type: Fortification
- Condition: Can be visited from the trail of the same name

Site history
- Materials: Stone
- Battles/wars: Invasion of Capri
- Events: Transformation of the structures and the trail into an ecomuseum

The forts of Capri, also called coastal forts of Anacapri or Bourbon forts, are located on the island of Capri in Campania, Italy.

The structures, built between the 9th and 15th centuries, were initially used as watchtowers, since Capri was continually subjected to pirate raids. Destroyed by Saracen pirates, these ancient military constructions were rebuilt by the British or the French, who separately came into possession of the island, during the early 19th century. In 2004, the forts became an ecomuseum, with the restoration of their structures and the affixing of tiles describing their flora and fauna.

Today, it is possible to easily reach the forts thanks to a path that also connects the Blue Grotto with the Punta Carena lighthouse. The vegetation along the path of the forts is sparse, discontinuous and able to survive a harsh environment, being repeatedly hit by the ocean. On the other hand, there are not many animals, which generally live in the sparse forests or in the sea.

== Textual and graphical sources ==
The forts of Capri are first mentioned in a document in 1808, when Pietro Colletta, originally an officer of the Bourbon Corps, published the Journal of the Conquest of Capri. Colletta described in detail the last battles of the Invasion of Capri, which Joachim Murat had witnessed from Massa Lubrense.

The forts are first included on a map in 1808, when Captain Zannoni compiled an accurate map of the island of Capri. This was later reproduced in black and white in numerous twentieth-century books, whose authors assumed it to be proof that the forts were the work of the British. In contrast, the original color map bears the following caption at the bottom:

The short shots that can be seen marked around the perimeter of the island, as still on Mount Solaro, are the rifle defenses that are practiced [sic] in these countryside works, built on the occasion of the appearance of the British fleet in the Gulf of Naples, distinguishing that the lines of fire from whence these shots depart, if they are all in all red in color they denote the entrenchments for the advance made by the British, and the others marked with two parallel lines, are the motifs built by the French.

The first historiographical account of the forts was written by Rosario Mangoni who, in his work Ricerche topografiche ed archeologiche sull'isola di Capri, described their location, strategic function, wartime actions and users:

On the west coast of Anacapri three are built, the one called Pino to the north of the tip of Carena on a cape of the same name. Next to this along the same coast there is a second on another little cape called Campitello, and the last one is on the tip of Niglio called Batteria di Orico: a place still renowned because the French landed there in 1808 when they took this island. The forts are still well armed and suitable for the defense of this coast.

— Mangoni

Mangoni published a second work in the same year, Ricerche storiche ed archeologiche sull'isola di Capri, in which he again mentioned the four military structures. The French general and historian Mathieu Dumas also mentioned the forts in a few pages of one of his essays, pointing out how hard it is to reach them.

The forts are then unmentioned by historians until after World War II, when authors such as Umberto Broccoli and Carlo de Nicola discuss them. Similarly, Roberto Ciuni mentions the forts in his book, La conquista di Capri. Other authors who mentioned the forts include Salvatore Borà, Romana de Angelis Bertolotti and Eduardo Federico.

In 2005, the cultural association Oebalus mentioned the forts in the third volume of the collection Conoscere Capri. Here, Borà describes them "through the maps, cartographies and statements of people who witnessed the historical events that took place on the island between 1806 and 1808." One of the most comprehensive textual sources concerning the forts was published in 2004, when the municipality of Anacapri distributed a paper document containing an accurate description of the forts and the flora and fauna of the path joining them.

== History ==
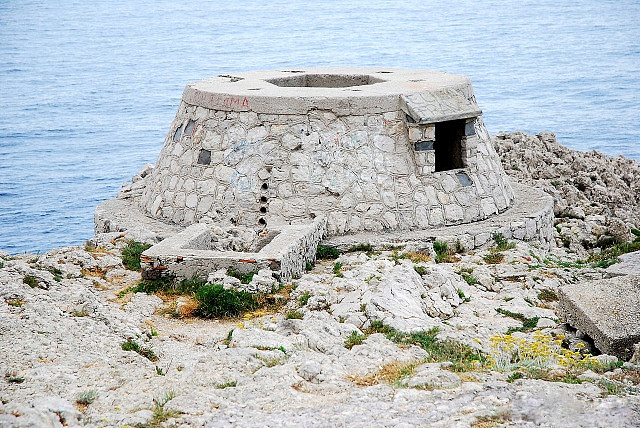
The forts were built as watchtowers to counter the danger of pirate raids.

=== Middle Ages ===
Given its strategic location within the Gulf of Naples, Capri was subjected to the constant raids of pirates for a long time. The phenomenon of piracy and privateering has characterized the island's history since the ninth century, when the Saracens raided the Mediterranean coast.

As the island was subjected to repeated attacks by Barbary raiders, the decision was made to build more watchtowers along the eastern coast of Anacapri. These would catch sight of corsair ships from afar and give timely warnings to the defenseless populations, who then had the opportunity to take refuge in safer places, such as Barbarossa Castle.

However, these forts, like the other coastal towers and castles on the island, were destroyed at an unspecified point by the captains of the various raiders who, during the retreat, destroyed all the resources they were unable to take with them.

=== Napoleonic era ===
When Napoleon took the city of Naples from Ferdinand IV in 1806 and forced him to flee to Sicily, Napoleon appointed his brother, Joseph Bonaparte, as king of Naples. The Neapolitan ruler twice made an attempt to retake the island from England, which had settled on the island in May of that year, but failed both times. On October 3, 1808, Joachim Murat, who had been named king of Naples in August, ordered General Jean Maximilien Lamarque to organize the fleet to be led to Capri.

According to the archaeologist Umberto Broccoli, the expedition consisted of "sixty transports [...] escorted by the entire war flotilla, commanded by Giuseppe Correale and consisting of the frigate Ceres, commanded by Bausan, the corvette Fama, twenty-six gunboats and ten armed fishing boats."

Murat, meanwhile, went to Posillipo in Naples to observe the landing operations; during the final effort, he moved to Massa Lubrense, a town on the Sorrento peninsula, where he watched the last battles.

After deceiving the British troops by pretending to target Marina Grande, Marina Piccola and Tragara, the French landed at Anacapri, which was poorly guarded as it was considered inaccessible from the sea. Lamarque's men, once landed near Orrico, hoisted themselves, using ladders, up a vertical slope overhanging the sea. Then, surprising the British, the French quickly captured Anacapri and the town of Capri below, which had previously been under siege. The British signed surrender pacts on October 16; the following day, the Franco-Napolitans victoriously entered the island.

During this time, the forts were recovered and turned into short-firing artillery redoubts. It is still unclear, however, who precisely rebuilt the various forts. The British forts, built to protect the emplacement from which the British armed forces were pulling, usually have massive walls and face the sea. By contrast, forts facing the mountain, with thinner walls equipped with loopholes and some covered rooms intended for the maintenance of foodstuffs, are generally attributed to the French.

=== Contemporary age ===
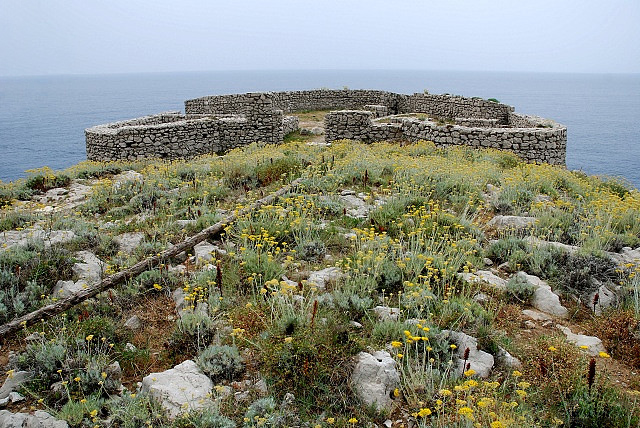
Nowadays, after a restoration in 2003, the forts constitute the world's first open-air ecomuseum.

After the capture of Capri, the forts were abandoned and were then neglected for almost all of the twentieth century despite their high historical and scenic value. It was not until 1972, with the restoration project of the Orrico fort, that people began to think about a project that would include the restoration of all the existing forts along the west coast of Anacapri and the related paths. This project was taken up by the municipal administration beginning in 1996, based on an organic design by architect Enrico Lucca. The municipality of Anacapri sponsored the work with the financial contribution of the European Union; work began in 1997 and ended in 2004.

During the restoration work, work was also carried out to "make all aspects of the area legible": more than two hundred majolica tablets, produced by ceramist Sergio Rubino and describing its history, flora and fauna, were placed along the path. The botanical, historical and geological texts were made by Tullia Rizzotti and the texts on fauna were written by Gennaro Aprea.

The forts and the trail, after restoration work carried out in 2003, became the world's first open-air artistic-didactic ecomuseum.

== Descriptions ==
=== Orrico Fort ===
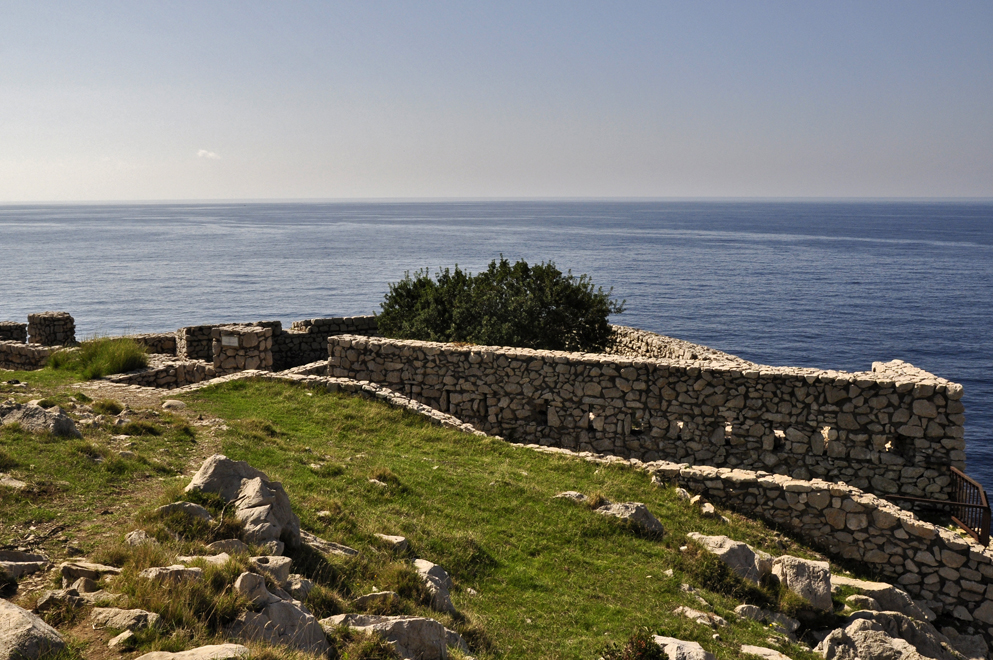
View of the Orrico fort

The Orrico fort opens onto the tip of the Miglio, about thirty meters above sea level, and has a semicircular wall with a radius of ten meters and a thickness of two meters.

The reconstruction of the Orrico fort is traditionally attributed to both the British and the French. The British placed two white stone blocks inside the fort, on which the cannons were placed, and created a moat with loopholes for the riflemen in the back section of the building. The French, on the other hand, built the fort's defense works upstream.

The toponymy of the term "Orrico" is unknown, but it most likely has a Hellenic origin. It has been claimed to come from the Greek word orrica, meaning "flowering field", as, in springtime, the dry meadows and rocky slopes in the area burst into flower.

=== Mesola Fort ===
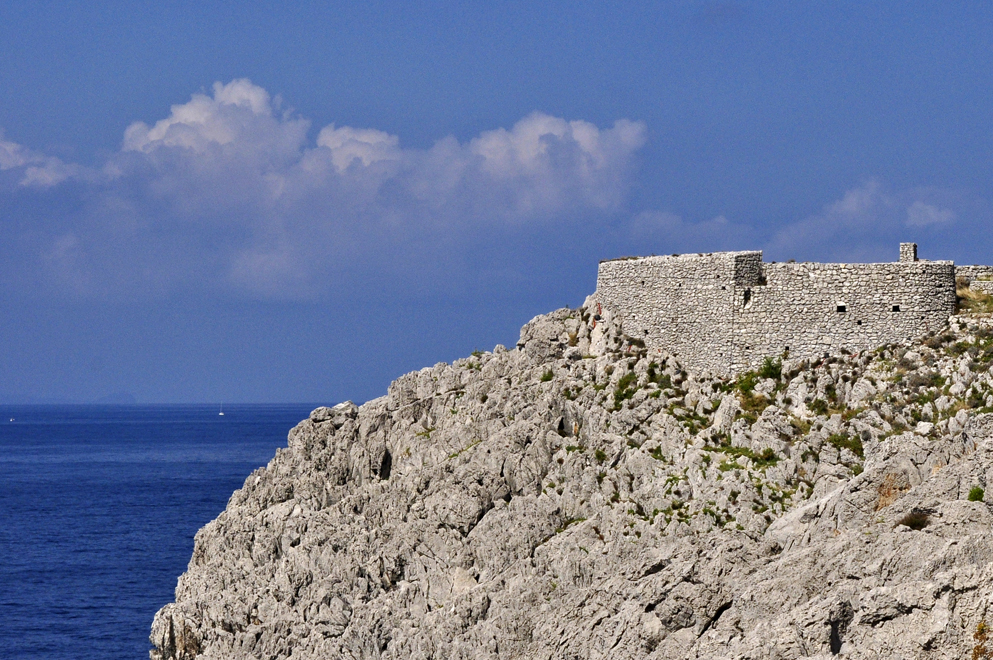
View of the Mesola fort

The Mesola fort opens onto the Campetiello peninsula, from which its other name, "Fort of Campetiello", originates. This name refers to the De Campetiello family, originally from Tramonti, who owned the area in 1129, when the island was still part of the Amalfi Republic.

The Mesola fort was built in a strategic position, allowing the control of the entire coastal strip between Cala di Mezzo and Cala del Lupinaro. The fortification has a rougher structure and a larger curved wall, built to protect the firing position. It also has four upper rectangular compartments symmetrical to the entrance, and a basement compartment where wounded soldiers were probably treated. The fort also has an outer perimeter moat facing upstream.

The Mesola area has probably been inhabited since prehistoric times; some obsidian tools, fragments of vases and other artifacts have been unearthed in the area. Human presence in this area was possible, according to Friedlander, due to the existence of some water rivulets that have now disappeared or gone underground. In Greek and Roman times, there was a landing spot in the area, and the remains of a staircase carved into the rock can still be seen today.

=== Pino Fort ===
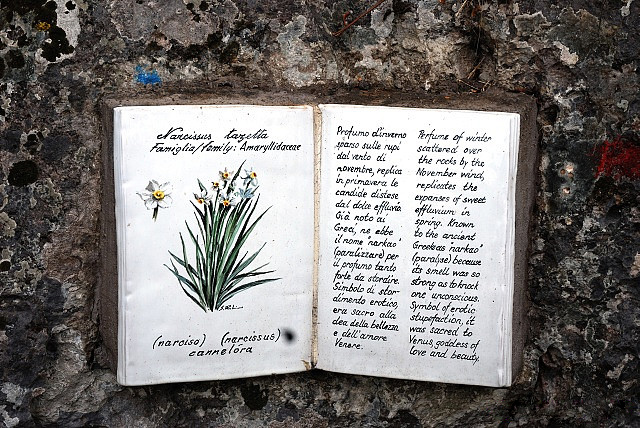
The majolica depicted here features a description of the daffodil.

The Pino fort sits on the rugged cliffs of Cala di Mezzo and overlooks the Cala di Tombosiello, forty meters above sea level. The fort, larger in size than Orrico and Mesola, was built for the purpose of controlling a large portion of territory; it was able to guard the Cala di Mezzo to the north and the Cala del Limmo to the south.

This structure, attributed to the French, consists of two centrally located high rooms: one features a vaulted ceiling, while the other is covered by a flat wooden surface. A third room, later collapsed, was also present. The fort, also equipped with a cistern for water supply, was modified by the British, who added a firing square overlooking the sea.

The location constituted the end of a fortified wall that originated from the watchtower; nowadays, this same wall, although still partly visible, has been cut off by the carriage road that connects the lighthouse with the center of the municipality. The wall, about 180 meters long and equipped with loopholes for riflemen, closed the gap between the heights of the watchtower and the precipice of the Limmo Cove. The wall was bordered by a trench into which enemies plunged and were then impaled by sharp nails set into the rock.

=== Cannon Fort ===
The Cannon Fort, not far from the Punta Carena lighthouse, opens onto the Tombosiello Cove, from which its other name, "Tombosiello Fort", originates. The building, erected by the British, has a conical shape and a radius of three meters; these small dimensions are due in par to the rugged nature of the area and in part to its proximity to other military structures, such as the Pino Fort and the Guard Tower.

== Flora and fauna ==
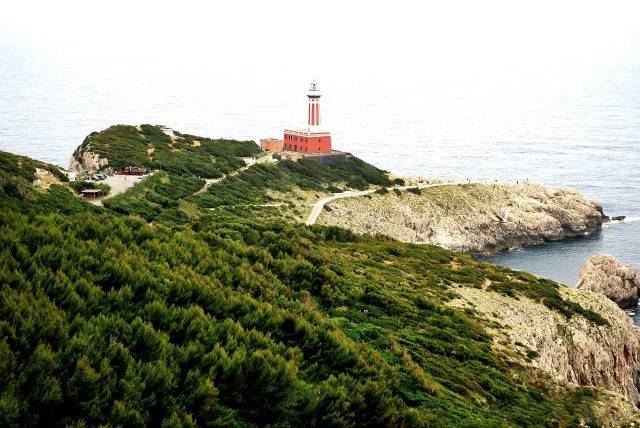
Trail of the forts
End of the trail at the Punta Carena lighthouse.
Location	West coast of the island of Capri, Anacapri
Length	5.2 km
Beginning	Grotta Azzurra street, near villa Galatà
End	Via Nuova del Faro
Direction	North-South
Elevation gain	120 m
Walking time	4–5 hours
Difficulty	E
Elevation map

Flora and fauna of the trail
Flora
Narcissus	Pistacia lentiscus	Myrtus communis	Rhamnus alaternus
Ruta graveolens	Euphorbia	Asphodelus	Spartium junceum
Muscari comosum	Quercus ilex	Pistacia lentiscus	Nerium oleander
Ceratonia	Foeniculum vulgare	Gladiolus	Quercus pubescens
Juniperus phoenicea	Asphodelus	Campanula fragilis	Pinus halepensis
Acanthus	Arum italicum	Arisarum vulgare	Cyclamen
Agave	Crithmum maritimum	Helichrysum	Lotus cytisoides
Limonium johannis	Anthyllis barba-Jovis	Centaurea cineraria	Matthiola incana
Fauna
Scolopax rusticola	Falco ardosiaceus	Falco peregrinus	Balaenoptera physalus
Physeter macrocephalus	Delphinus	Streptopelia turtur	Coturnix coturnix
Cerambyx cerdo	Otus scops	Luscinia megarhynchos	Mus musculus
Epinephelinae	Muraenidae	Mugilidae	Diplodus
Scorpaenidae	Echinoidea	Gekkonidae	Chiroptera

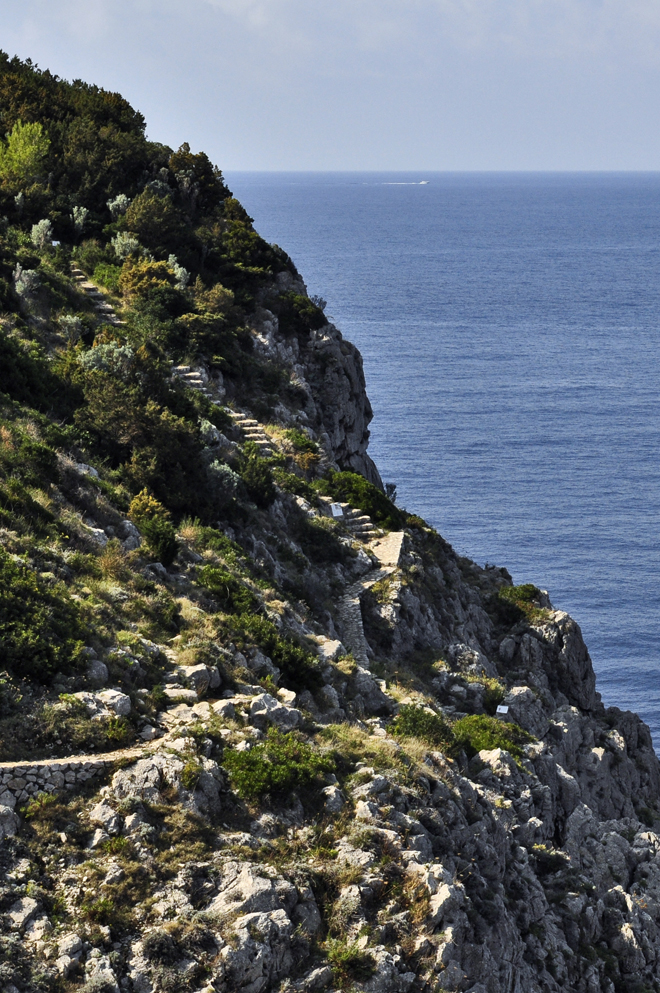
Part of the trail near Orrico

The trail of the forts, usually divided into three sections, connects the Punta Carena lighthouse with the Blue Grotto, passing through all four defensive structures along the entire western coast of the island of Capri.

The vegetation along the route is sparse and discontinuous, and consists mainly of dwarf shrubs that manage to survive in a hostile environment because they are continually watered by ocean spray. In fact, only plants capable of exploiting the rare soil accumulated between the rocks and the little moisture present in the cracks in the rocks take root. The plants here include wild fennel and sea lavender.

Behind this sparse and discontinuous vegetation begins a denser and more complex flora that fades into a shade of green typical of the Maquis shrubland. These are below 3 metres (9.8 ft) in height and are composed mainly of juniper, myrtle and mastic trees. There are not many animal species in the area; most of them live in the sparse forests along the path or in the sea.

=== From the Blue Grotto to Orrico ===
The trail begins at the height of Villa l'Arcera with two panels that provide a general explanation of the path. It then heads close to the coast, away from the carriage road. At the beginning of the trail, there are a few rare specimens of tassel hyacinth, which was once quite common, and woodcocks, which have fallen victim of the hunting tradition that was strongly active in the area.

Continuing on, the path is overlooked by the promontory of Damecuta, known for being the place where Tiberius built one of his twelve villas and from which kestrels and peregrine falcons can be seen flying. The lane, beside which lentisk, myrtle and buckthorn grow, then leads to a scenic lookout carved between low scrub and sheer cliffs. Around the latter there is a copious flowering of rue, spurge and asphodel; further on, there is also Spanish broom.

From the lookout point, one can already catch a glimpse of the Orrico fort, which overlooks the tip of the Miglio. In the sea, it is possible to see fin whales, sperm whales and dolphins; these species are sometimes passing the island on their voyage from the Sorrento peninsula to the island of Ischia. Near the fort is a small square, the Largo Sculture del Vento, where some species of birds, such as turtle doves, woodcocks and quails, brought to the area by the breeze, used to be hunted.

After the Orrico Fort, the path runs along the edge of a forest of holm oaks, mastic trees and oleanders; wild asparagus grows prosperously in its shade. Continuing on, it is possible to reach the Beach of the Goats, so called because it is not uncommon to find goats there. After the shore, the trail, bending to the left, turns away from the sea and enters a wooded area.

=== The wooded path towards Mesola ===
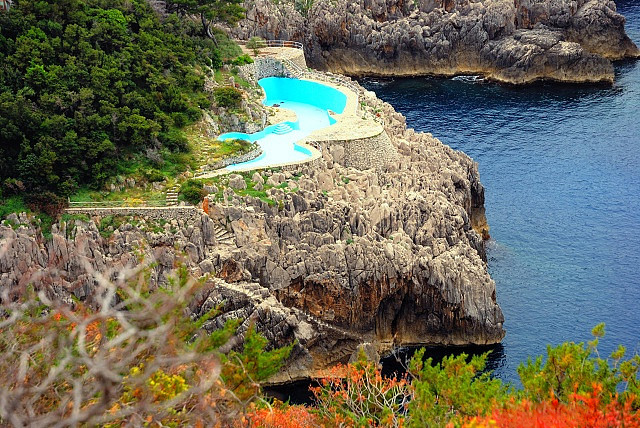
The lobed silhouette of the swimming pool at the former Villa Rovelli

After the Beach of the Goats, the Fortini path enters a once cultivated wooded area where terraces, supported by crumbling walls and hidden by wild vegetation, are still visible. Many songbirds stop in the area and carob, fennel and gladiolus thrive.

Going further on, there is a small oak forest which houses species including the great capricorn beetle, the rhinoceros beetle, the scops owl, the nightingale and the wood mouse. At this point, the path, flanking the fence wall of a villa, is surrounded byMediterranean buckthorn, myrtle and Phoenician juniper; the latter gives its name to this portion, the Street of the Old Junipers.

Continuing on, the scrub thins out and it is possible to see the sea again. At this point, a glimpse of a lobate-shaped pool forming part of the private Villa Rovelli, which opens onto an unnamed peninsula between the Lupinaro and Rio creeks, appears. A flight of living stone steps leads to a wider, rural road, often known as Via Passo della Capra or Slargo dei Rosmarini e degli Asfodeli; asphodel, rosemary and rock campanula bloom copiously here. The trail is then concealed by a forest of Aleppo pines, extending close to the Villa Rovelli, where a few hoopoes can be encountered.

The trail continues on to the Acanthus Gorge, where the plant of the same name, as well as species of arum and larus, grow. In the next section, there is an ilex forest where, in autumn, there is a copious flowering of cyclamens. Leaving the forest, one reaches the Agave Plot, where agave and scilla, a species rare in the rest of the Mediterranean basin but quite common on the island, are present. Helichrysum and sea fennel, which fights aridity by accumulating liquids through its succulent leaves, also grow among the cliffs. Noticeably, the bushes here generally appear domed and flattened against the ground, in order to defend themselves from the wind, which is quite violent in this area.

Proceeding along the Path of the Wind, there is the cove of Rio Latino, near which stands the Mesola fort. In this place, where Lotus cytisoides and marine static sprout and where there is a strong community of geckos and bats, there are the remains of a lime kiln, in which marble from Roman villas and ground limestone rock were melted. Rio Cove also includes a particularly rich stretch of sea, where octopuses, groupers, moray eels, mullets, scorpion fishes and sea urchins breed.

=== From Mesola to Pino ===
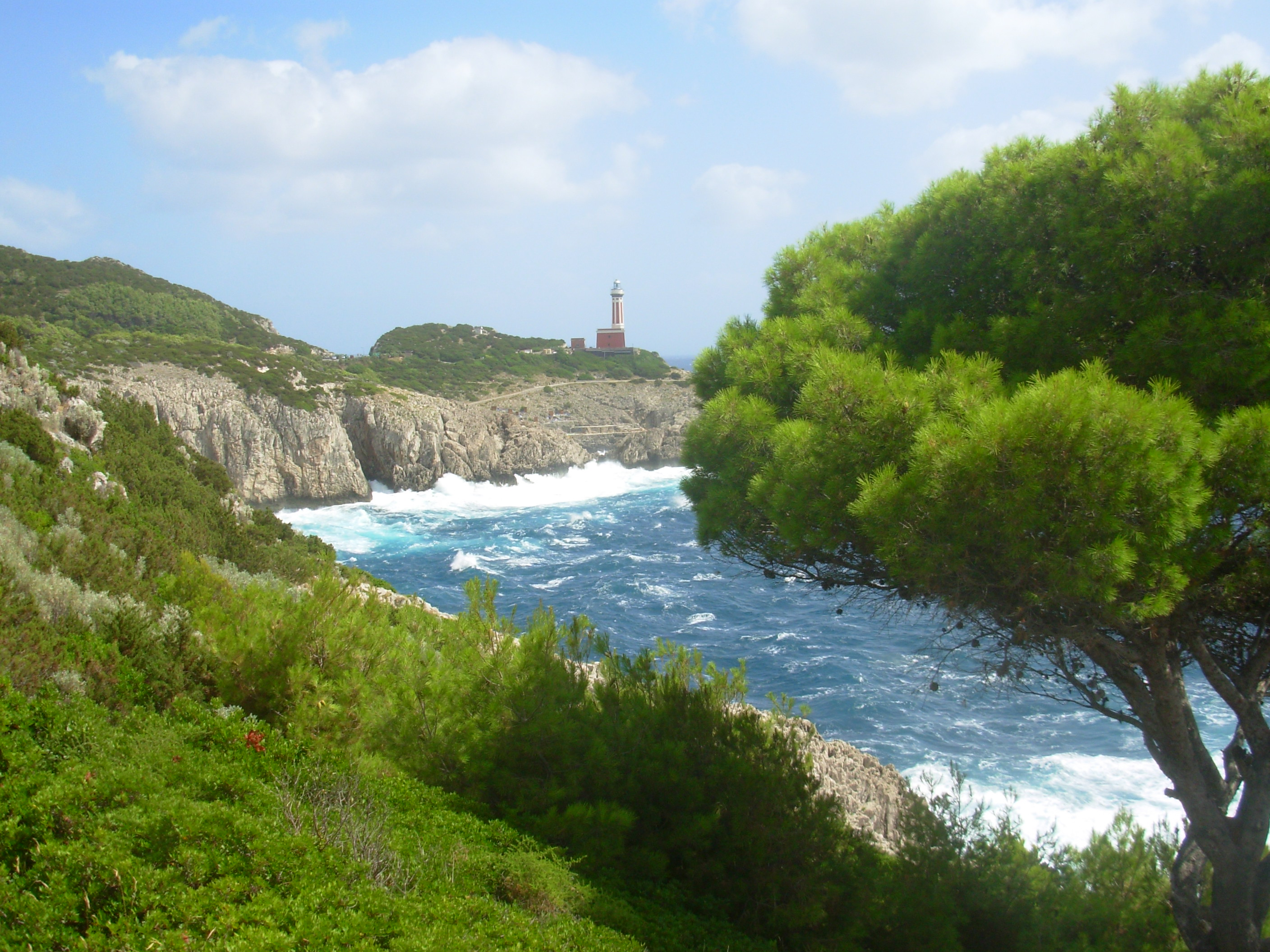
Pineta del Faro, a forested area present at the end of the trail.

The path then passes the Mesola fort and crosses a small thicket of anthyllis referred to as the "Flowering Moon", which anticipates the silvery reflections of the Campetiello peninsula, whose rock is corroded by karst, water and wind. Next, there is Mezzo Cove, also known as the "Silver Fjord", a long fjord squeezed between rock walls on which numerous floral species, such as cliff cornflower and gilly-flower, sprout.

Further along, the trail descends and reaches Tombosiello Cove, an area made up of gray limestone, where the Phoenician juniper and the Maquis shrubland thrive. The trail passes the Pino fort, detours past the Cannon fort and ends at a fork whose branches lead to the carriage road and the Faro pine forest.

== Initiatives ==
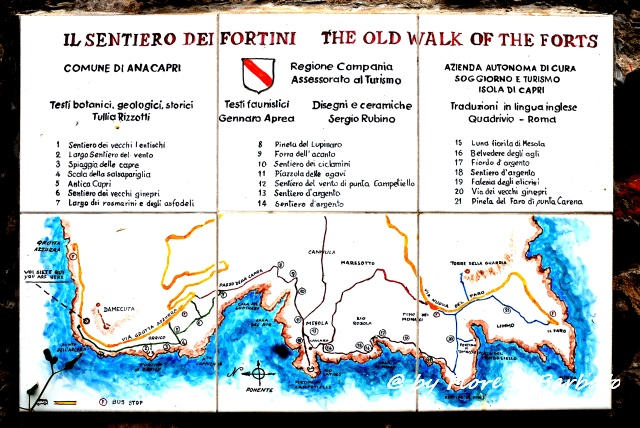
Explanatory map of the forts trail

The forts and the path are experiencing new uses that are quite unusual given their military purpose; they are being used to illustrate Capri's history, flora and fauna. Due to its considerable scenic and naturalistic value, the trail of the forts today is often involved in numerous guided hikes promoted by entities such as the Centro Caprense Ignazio Cerio and the Italian Alpine Club or by smaller cultural associations.

These walks generally include numerous stops at the forts and the Ruby Tiles. The Italian environmental association, Legambiente, has also organized a bicycle trip to Orrico fort.

The Fortini Trail also occasionally hosts sunset concerts by local singer-songwriter Almartino; it has also thus becomes a venue for musical events.

== See also ==
- Castello Barbarossa
- History of Capri

== Bibliography ==
- Andrén, Arvid (1991). Capri. Dall'età paleolitica all'età turistica. Roma.
- Bonetto, Cristian; Quintero, Josephine (2010). Napoli e la Costiera Amalfitana. EDT. ISBN 978-88-6040-540-1.
- Borà, Salvatore (1992). I nomi di Capri. Origine e storia di strade, corti e dintorni. La Conchiglia.
- Borà, Salvatore (2002). Itinerari storici e monumentali di Capri ed Anacapri. la Conchiglia.
- Broccoli, Umberto (1963). Cronache militari e marittime del Golfo di Napoli e delle isole pontine durante il decennio francese (1806-15). Ministero della difesa.
- Cerio, Edwin (1983). Flora privata di Capri. Alla scoperta di una vegetazione spontanea. Milano: Rizzoli.
- Ciuni, Roberto (1990). La conquista di Capri. Sellerio.
- De Angelis Bertolotti, Romana (July 1990). Capri. La natura e la storia. Zanichelli.
- de Nicola, Carlo; Ricci, Paolo (1963). Diario napoletano: dicembre 1798-dicembre 1800. Giordano Editore.
- Dumas, Mathieu (1838). Cenno su gli avvenimenti militari, ovvero Saggi storici sulle campagne dal 1799 al 1814. Stabilimento letterario-tipografico dell'Ateneo.
- Federico, Eduardo; Miranda, Elena (1998). Capri antica: dalla preistoria alla fine dell'età romana. La Conchiglia.
- Knowles, Sir Lees (1918). The British in Capri, 1806-1808 (PDF). John Lane Company.
- Mangoni, Rosario (1834). Ricerche storiche sull'isola di Capri. Palma.
- Mangoni, Rosario (1834). Ricerche topografiche ed archeologiche sull'isola di Capri. La Biblioteca Pubblica Bavarese.
- Rizzotti, Tullia (2003). Capri in Fiore. Editoriale Giorgio Mondadori.
- Capri. Casa Editrice Bonechi. 2002.
