= Carena =

Carena may refer to:

- Carena, Ticino, a hamlet within the municipality of Sant'Antonio in the Swiss canton of Ticino
- Carena (trademark), a trademark for the drug Aminophylline
- Felice Carena (1879–1966), Italian painter
- Marcela Carena (born 1962), Argentine physicist
- Punta Carena Lighthouse, a lighthouse on the Italian island of Capri
