= Anacapri =

Anacapri Ronnacràpe (Neapolitan)
- Comune
- Comune di Anacapri
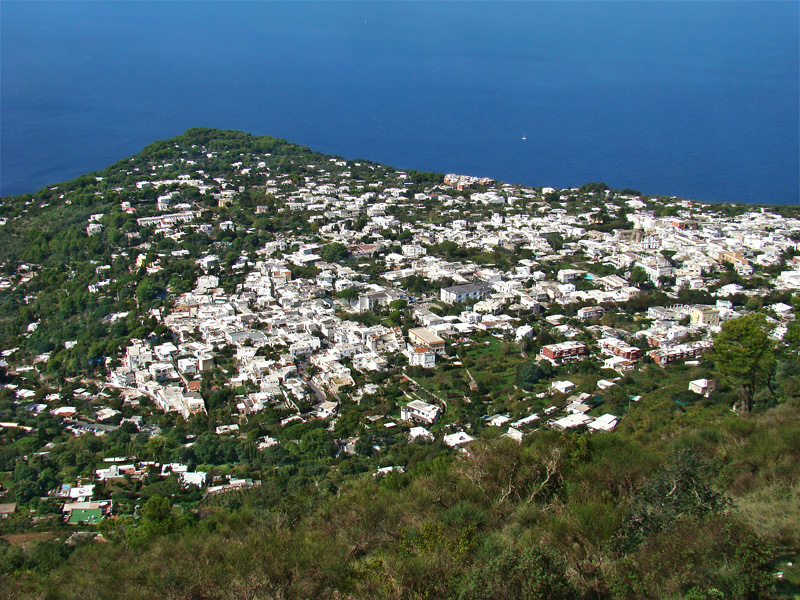
- View from Monte Solaro towards Anacapri

- Coat of arms

- Location within Italy Location within Campania
- Coordinates: 40°33′N 14°13′E
- Country: Italy
- Region: Campania
- Metropolitan city: Naples (NA)

Government
  - Mayor: Mario Staiano

Area
  - Total: 6.47 km^{2} (2.50 sq mi)
- Elevation: 275 m (902 ft)

Population (2026)
  - Total: 6,746
  - Density: 1,040/km^{2} (2,700/sq mi)
- Demonym: Anacaprese
- Time zone: UTC+1 (CET)
  - Summer (DST): UTC+2 (CEST)
- Postal code: 80071
- Dialing code: 081
- Patron saint: St. Anthony of Padua
- Saint day: 13 June
- Website: Official website

Anacapri (Italian: [anaˈkaːpri]) is a town and comune (municipality) on the island of Capri, in the Metropolitan City of Naples in the region of Campania in southern Italy. It has 6,746 inhabitants.

Anacapri is located higher on the island than Capri (about 150 m (490 ft) higher on average)—the Ancient Greek prefix ana- meaning "up" or "above". Administratively, it maintains a separate status from the comune of Capri.

== Climate ==
Climate data for Anacapri (1991–2020)
Month	Jan	Feb	Mar	Apr	May	Jun	Jul	Aug	Sep	Oct	Nov	Dec	Year
Record high °C (°F)	20.8 (69.4)	22.6 (72.7)	28.2 (82.8)	32.2 (90.0)	36.4 (97.5)	38.0 (100.4)	39.8 (103.6)	42.9 (109.2)	36.2 (97.2)	32.2 (90.0)	27.6 (81.7)	21.4 (70.5)	42.9 (109.2)
Mean daily maximum °C (°F)	13.7 (56.7)	14.3 (57.7)	16.8 (62.2)	19.8 (67.6)	24.4 (75.9)	28.7 (83.7)	31.7 (89.1)	32.4 (90.3)	28.3 (82.9)	23.5 (74.3)	18.3 (64.9)	14.6 (58.3)	22.2 (72.0)
Daily mean °C (°F)	10.9 (51.6)	10.7 (51.3)	12.7 (54.9)	15.4 (59.7)	19.6 (67.3)	23.8 (74.8)	26.4 (79.5)	27.0 (80.6)	23.5 (74.3)	19.5 (67.1)	15.3 (59.5)	12.0 (53.6)	18.1 (64.6)
Mean daily minimum °C (°F)	8.7 (47.7)	8.2 (46.8)	9.8 (49.6)	12.1 (53.8)	15.8 (60.4)	19.9 (67.8)	22.3 (72.1)	23.0 (73.4)	19.9 (67.8)	16.6 (61.9)	12.9 (55.2)	9.9 (49.8)	14.9 (58.8)
Record low °C (°F)	−0.2 (31.6)	−0.4 (31.3)	1.2 (34.2)	2.8 (37.0)	8.6 (47.5)	10.0 (50.0)	10.0 (50.0)	14.8 (58.6)	10.8 (51.4)	5.8 (42.4)	0.0 (32.0)	0.0 (32.0)	−0.4 (31.3)
Average precipitation mm (inches)	71.4 (2.81)	58.1 (2.29)	52.7 (2.07)	40.4 (1.59)	25.8 (1.02)	16.2 (0.64)	10.9 (0.43)	23.9 (0.94)	58.4 (2.30)	87.5 (3.44)	95.5 (3.76)	84.9 (3.34)	625.7 (24.63)
Average precipitation days (≥ 1.0 mm)	8.3	6.8	6.7	5.5	3.9	2.3	1.3	1.7	5.5	6.7	9.4	8.9	66.9
Average relative humidity (%)	70.5	68.6	69.7	69.4	68.4	67.9	67.1	67.4	67.3	70.4	71.9	70.2	69.1
Average dew point °C (°F)	5.5 (41.9)	4.9 (40.8)	7.0 (44.6)	9.4 (48.9)	13.1 (55.6)	17.0 (62.6)	19.2 (66.6)	20.2 (68.4)	16.7 (62.1)	13.9 (57.0)	10.1 (50.2)	6.4 (43.5)	12.0 (53.6)
Source: NOAA

== Demographics ==
As of 2026, the population is 6,746, of which 49.1% are male, and 50.9% are female. Minors make up 14.7% of the population, and seniors make up 22.9%.

Historical population

Year	Pop.	±%
1861	1,637	—
1871	1,839	+12.3%
1881	2,021	+9.9%
1901	2,316	+14.6%
1911	2,376	+2.6%
1921	2,437	+2.6%
1931	2,512	+3.1%
1936	2,613	+4.0%

Year	Pop.	±%
1951	3,083	+18.0%
1961	3,579	+16.1%
1971	4,239	+18.4%
1981	4,633	+9.3%
1991	5,324	+14.9%
2001	5,855	+10.0%
2011	6,546	+11.8%
2021	6,882	+5.1%

Source: ISTAT

=== Immigration ===
As of 2025, immigrants make up 10.5% of the population. The 5 largest foreign countries of birth are Sri Lanka, Ukraine, Romania, Argentina, and Albania.

== Sights ==
- Casa Caprile
- Castello Barbarossa
- Belvedere della Migliera (or Migliara)
- Casa Rossa
- San Michele Arcangelo, Anacapri
- Chiesa di Santa Sofia
- Eremo di Santa Maria a Cetrella
- Le Boffe
- Sentiero dei fortini
- Phoenician Steps (Scala Fenicia)
- Monte Solaro
- Punta Carena Lighthouse
- Casa Cernia di Luigi Cosenza
- Villa Damecuta
- Blue Grotto

== Transport ==
Bus and taxi services connect Marina Grande to Capri and Anacapri via the numerous hairpin turns of Via Giuseppe Orlandi.

A chairlift (seggiovia) in Anacapri connects Piazza Vittoria to the 589 m (1,932 ft) Monte Solaro, providing wide views of the south-facing coast.

== In popular culture ==
French composer Claude Debussy named one of the pieces from his first book of preludes—No. 5, "Les collines d'Anacapri" ("The Hills of Anacapri")—in homage to the community.

== Gallery ==
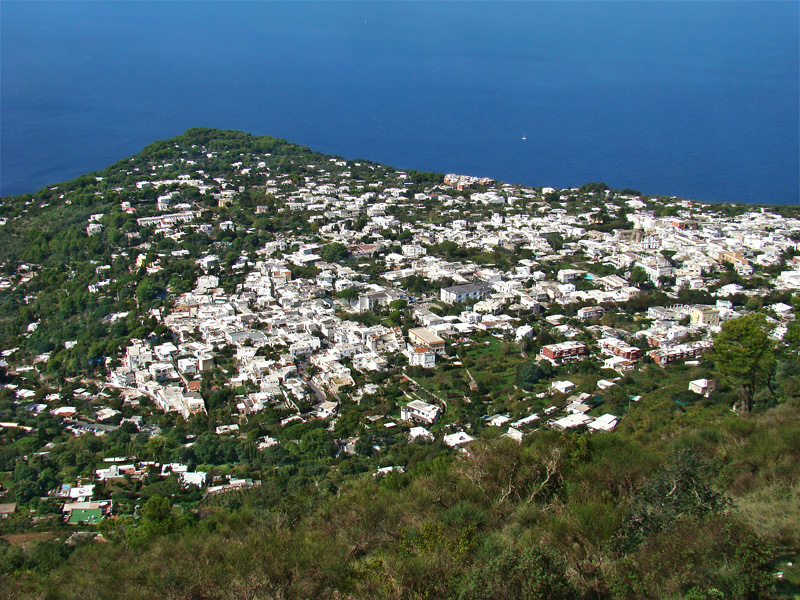
Anacapri viewed from the chairlift to Monte Solaro

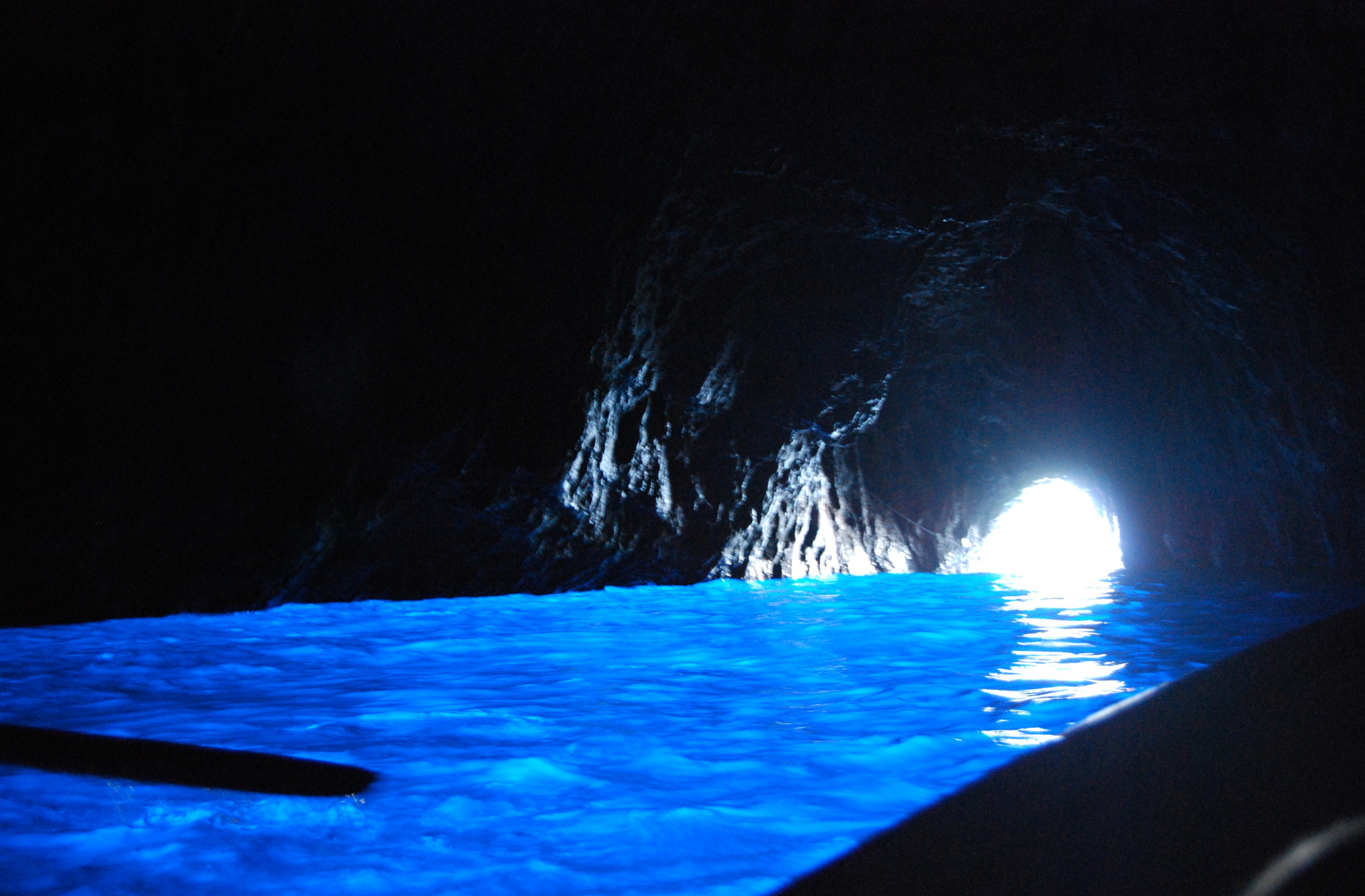
The Blue Grotto

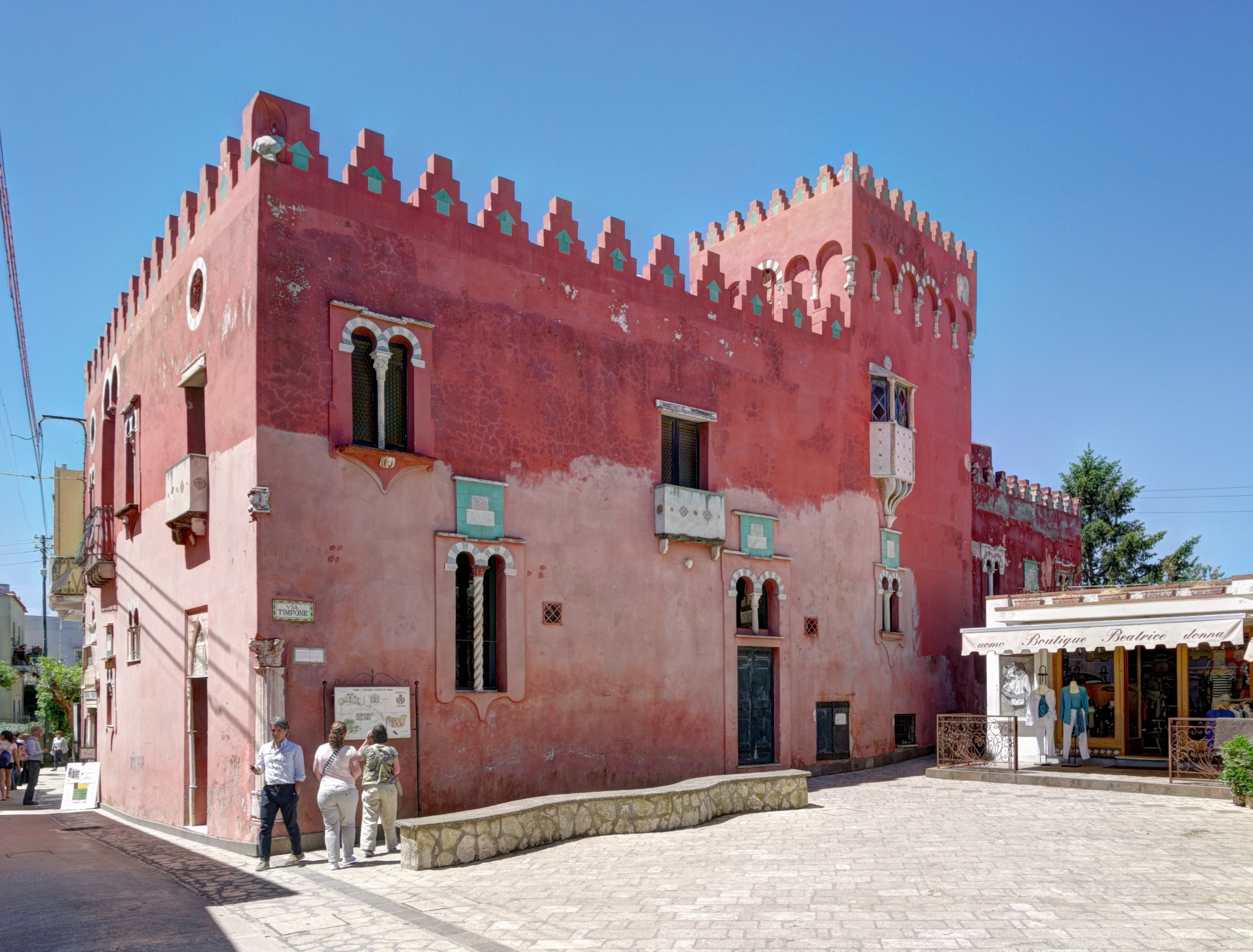
Casa Rossa

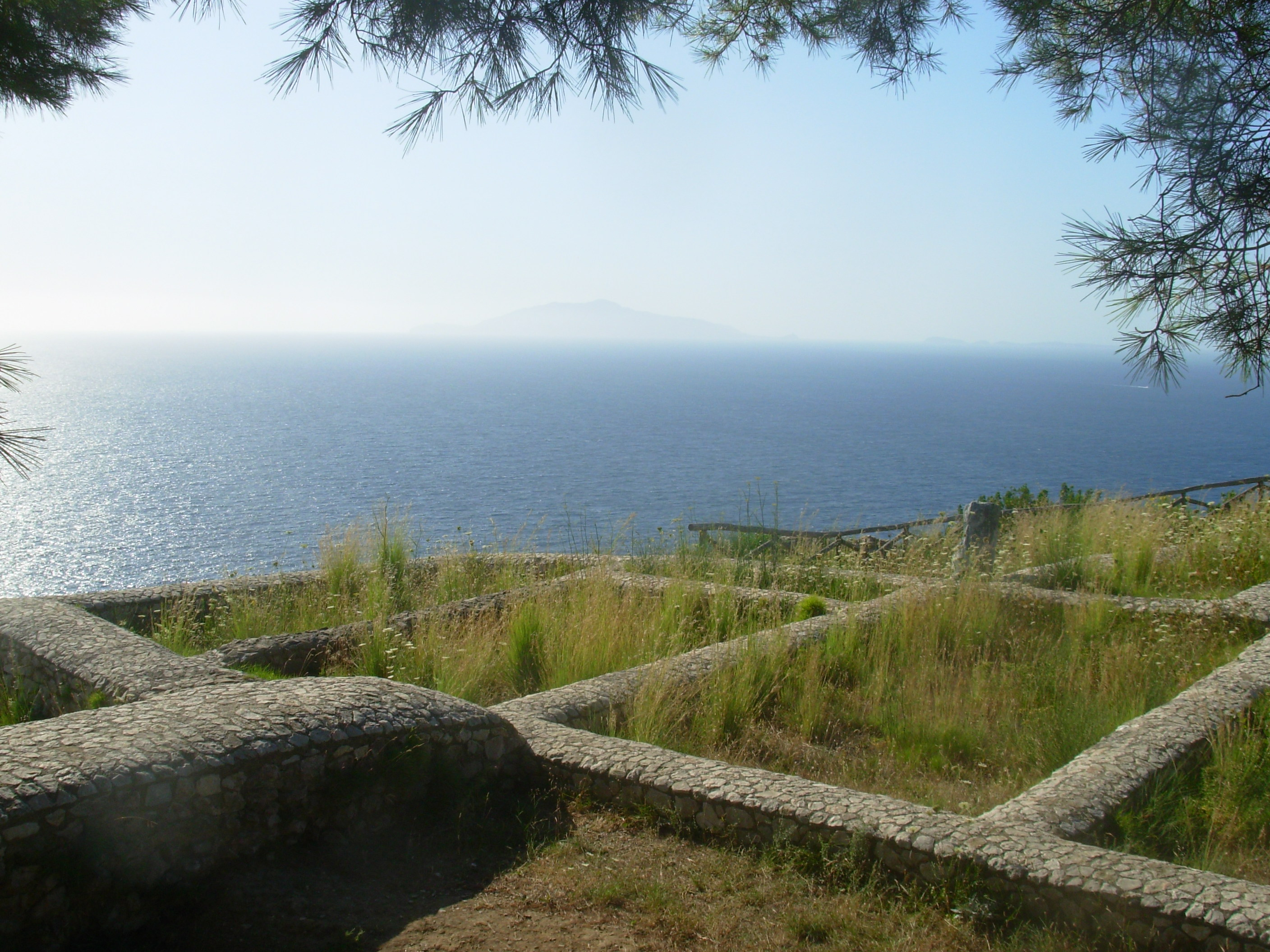
The ruins of Villa Damecuta

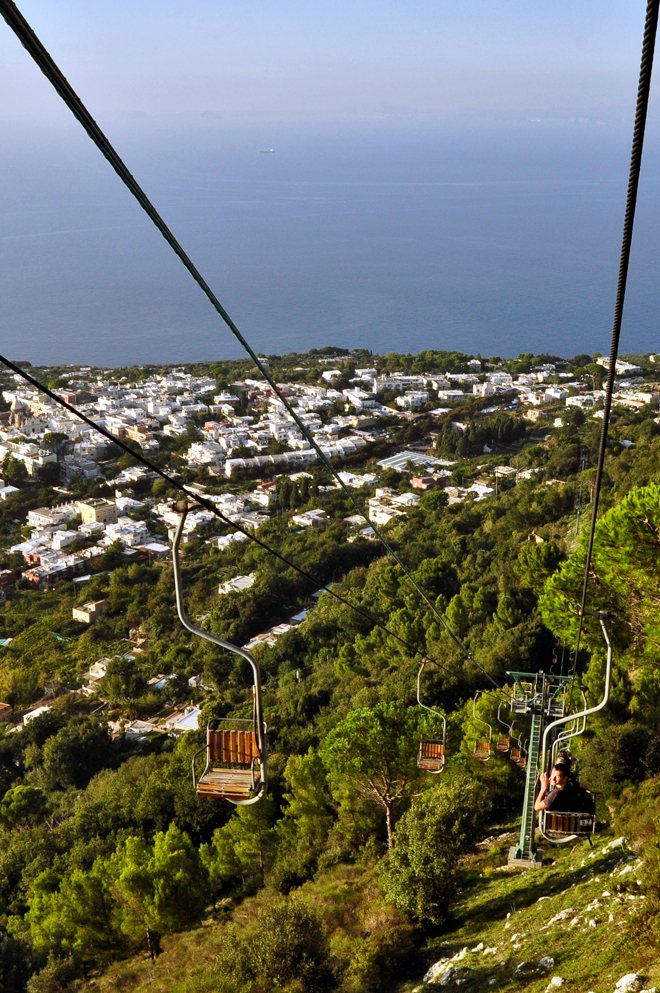
Chairlift to Monte Solaro

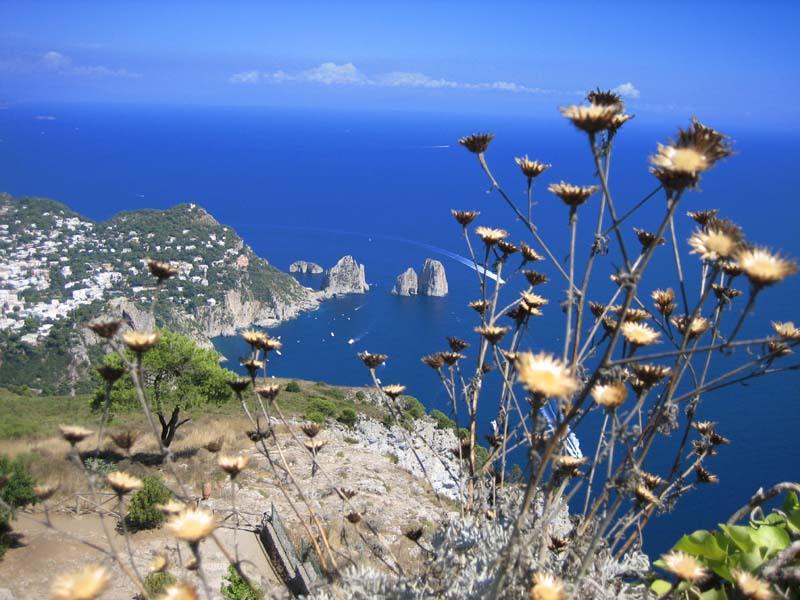
View from Monte Solaro towards the Faraglioni

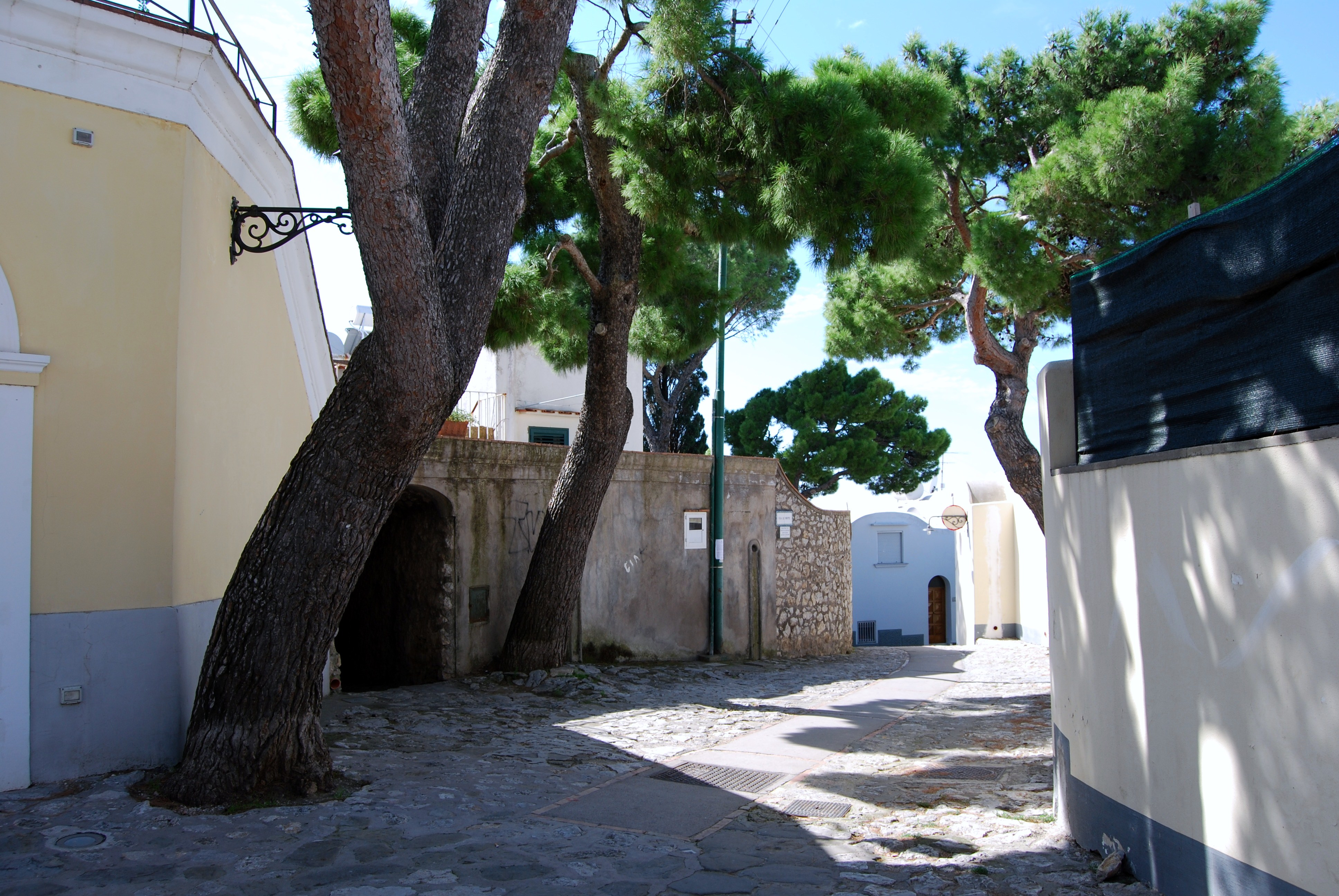
Anacapri street

== See also ==
- City of Capri
- Capri island
- Forts of Capri
