= San Michele Arcangelo, Anacapri =

Roman Catholic church in Anacapri, Italy

Coordinates: 40°33′17.35″N 14°13′2.01″E

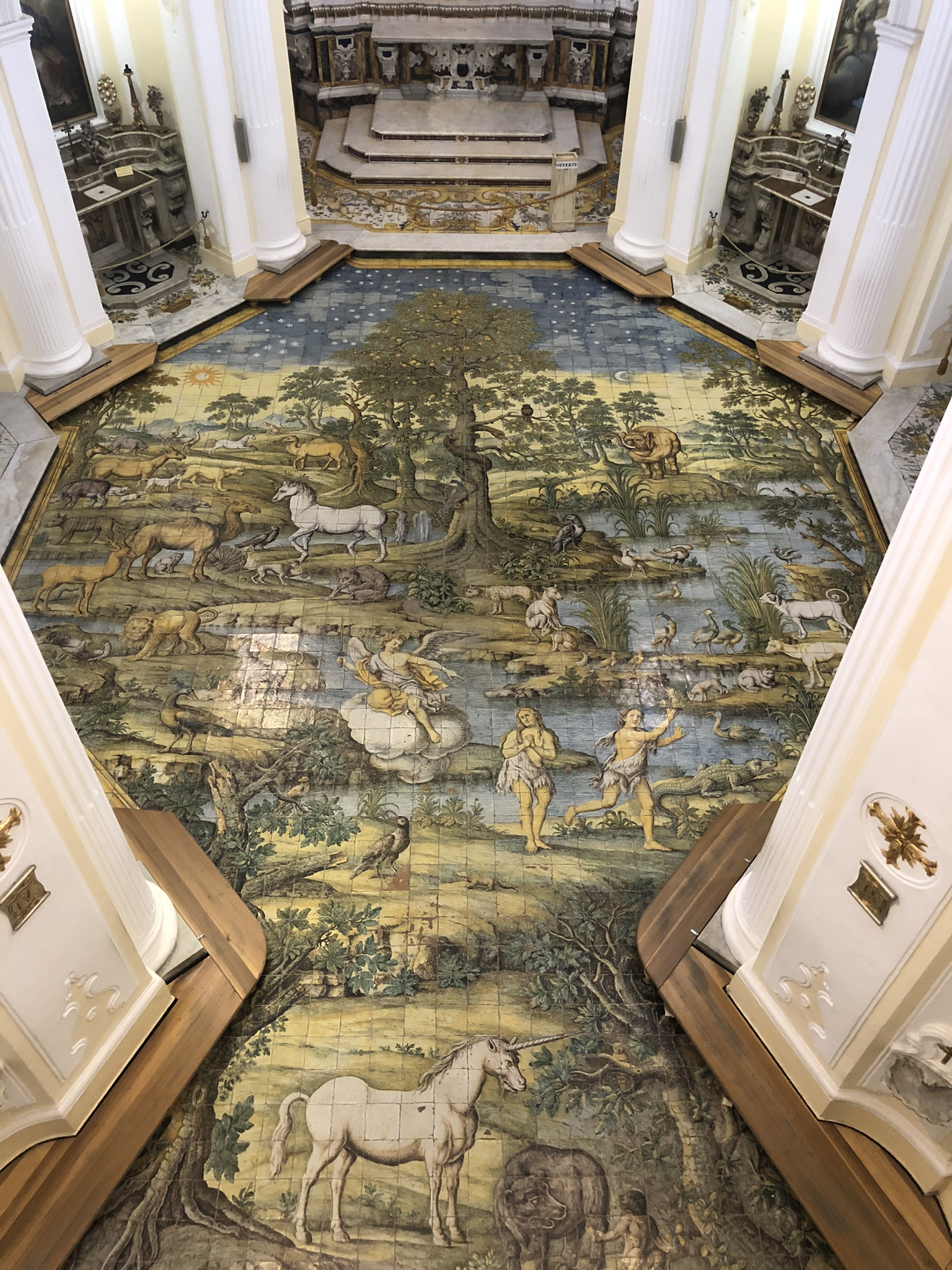
Majolica floor mosaic

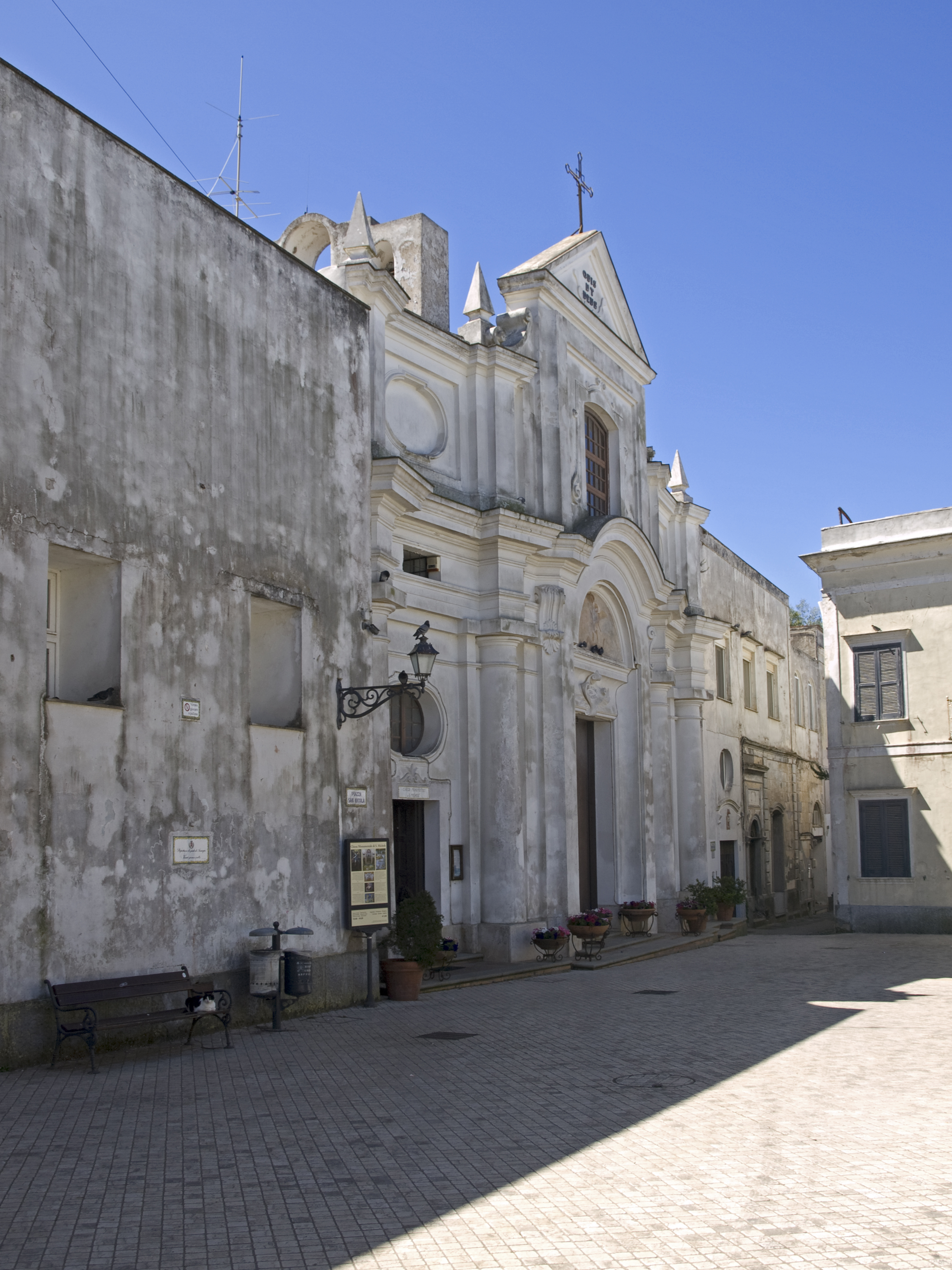
The facade of the church

San Michele Arcangelo (Church of St Michael the Archangel) is a Roman catholic church located in Anacapri, Capri, Italy. Located on Piazza San Nicola and built in 1719, it is octagonal in shape and of Baroque style. The church received a "monument" designation due to its notable majolica floor mosaic.
