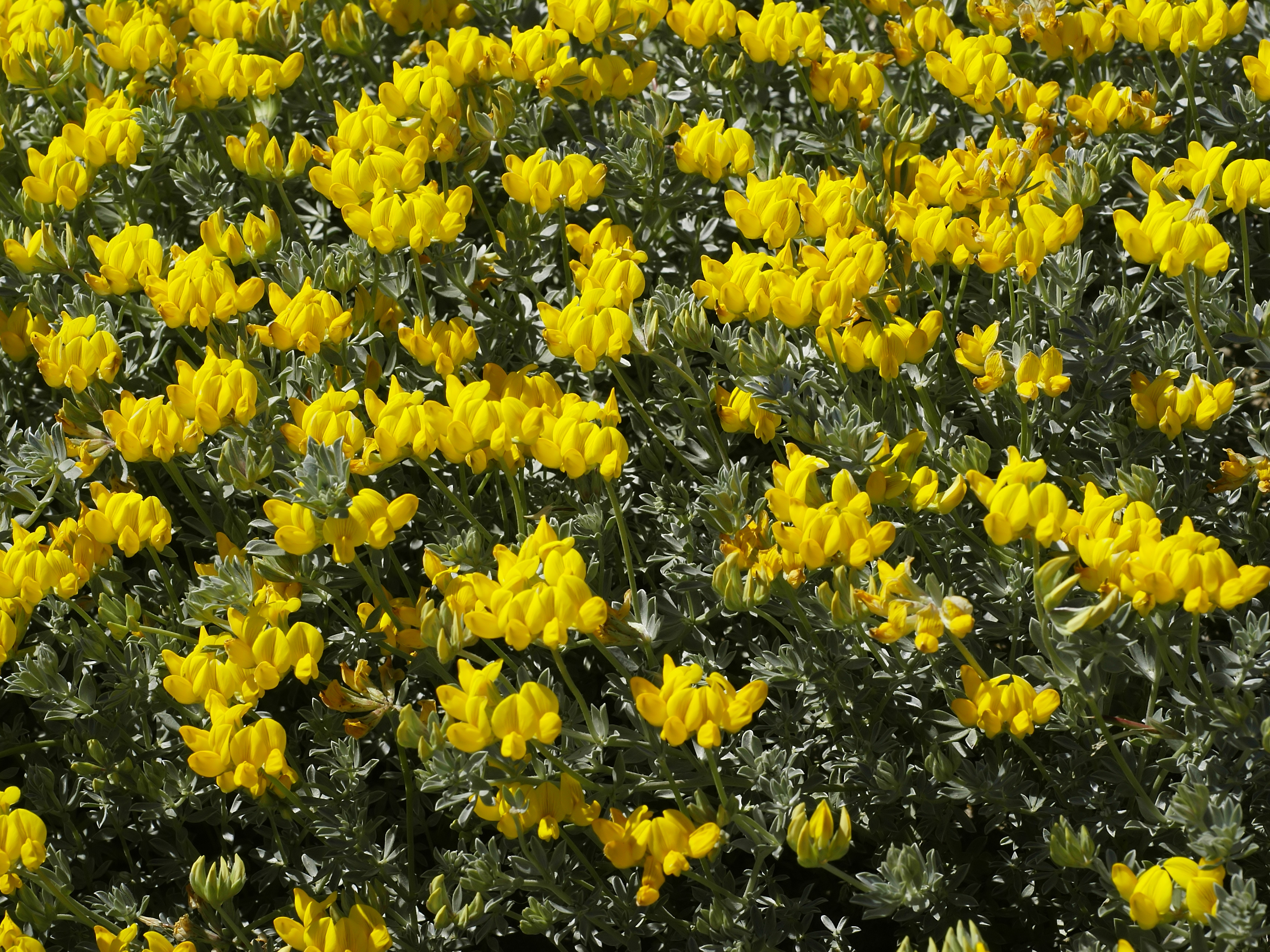

Scientific classification
- Kingdom: Plantae
- Clade: Embryophytes
- Clade: Tracheophytes
- Clade: Spermatophytes
- Clade: Angiosperms
- Clade: Eudicots
- Clade: Rosids
- Order: Fabales
- Family: Fabaceae
- Subfamily: Faboideae
- Genus: Lotus
- Species: L. cytisoides

Binomial name
- Lotus cytisoides L.

Synonyms
- Lotus creticus subsp. cytisoides

= Lotus cytisoides =

Species of plant

Lotus cytisoides is a species of perennial herb in the family Fabaceae native to the Mediterranean. They have a self-supporting growth form and compound, broad leaves. Individuals can grow to 0.11 m.

== Sources ==
This article incorporates text from a free content work. Licensed under CC0 (license statement/permission). Text taken from Lotus cytisoides. Encyclopedia of Life.
