= Punta Carena Lighthouse =

Punta Carena
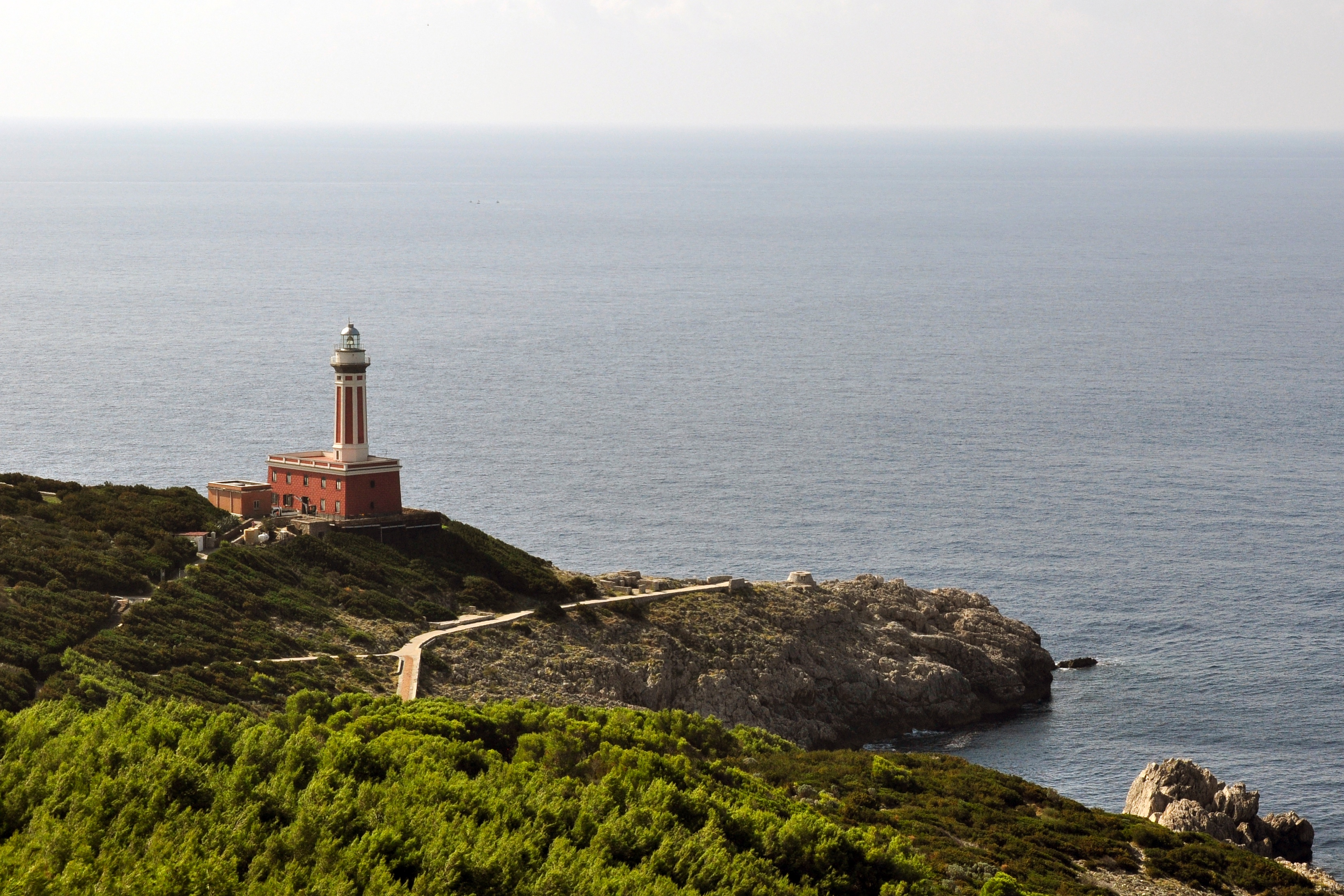
- Punta Carena Lighthouse
- Location: Capri; Campania; Italy
- Coordinates: 40°32′11″N 14°11′56″E

Tower
- Constructed: 1867
- Construction: masonry tower
- Height: 28 metres (92 ft)
- Shape: octagonal tower on a two-story keeper's house
- Markings: white and red vertical stripes tower, white lantern, grey lantern dome
- Power source: mains electricity
- Operator: Marina Militare

Light
- Focal height: 73 metres (240 ft)
- Lens: 2nd order Fresnel lens
- Intensity: main: AL 1000 W reserve: LABI 100 W
- Range: main: 25 nautical miles (46 km; 29 mi) reserve: 18 nautical miles (33 km; 21 mi)
- Characteristic: Fl W 3s.
- Italy no.: 2612 E.F

Punta Carena Lighthouse (Italian: Faro di Punta Carena) is an active lighthouse, located on the island of Capri on the head of the same name, about 3 kilometres (1.9 mi) southwest of Anacapri. The lighthouse has been active since 1867; its construction began in 1862.

== Description ==
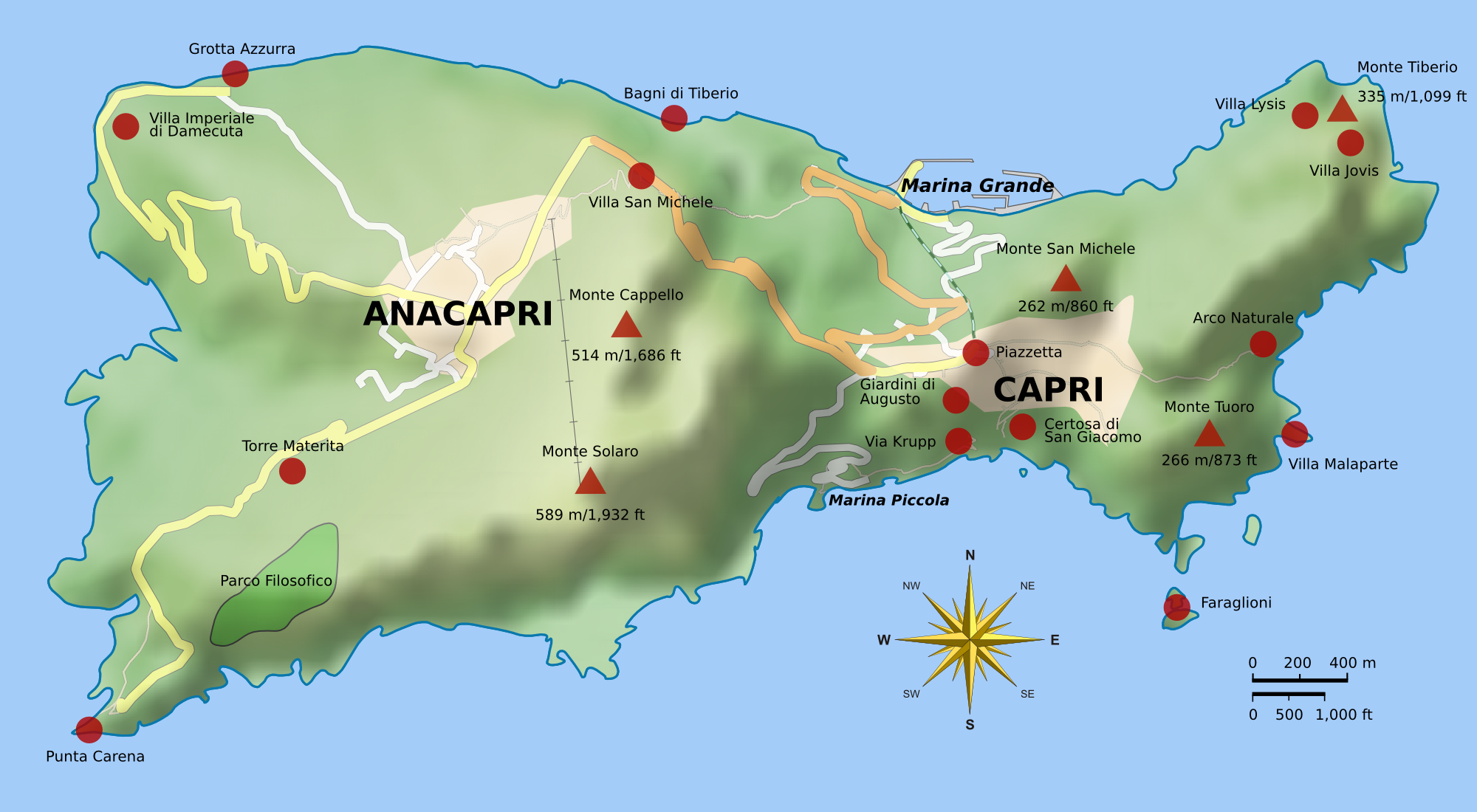
Location of Punta Carena Lighthouse at the South-West tip of Capri

It consists of an octagonal prism brick tower with lantern and gallery, above a two-story building. The lighthouse was repainted recently and is now white with red vertical stripes, and the keeper's house in red.

The lighthouse has a rotating view that emits white light flashes every 3 seconds. The focal plane is located at 73 meters above sea level. The lighthouse has a range of 25 nautical miles (about 46 km), and is therefore defined as an offshore lighthouse. It is a 28 m (92 ft) octagonal masonry tower on a two-story house.

== See also ==
- List of lighthouses in Italy
- Forts of Capri
