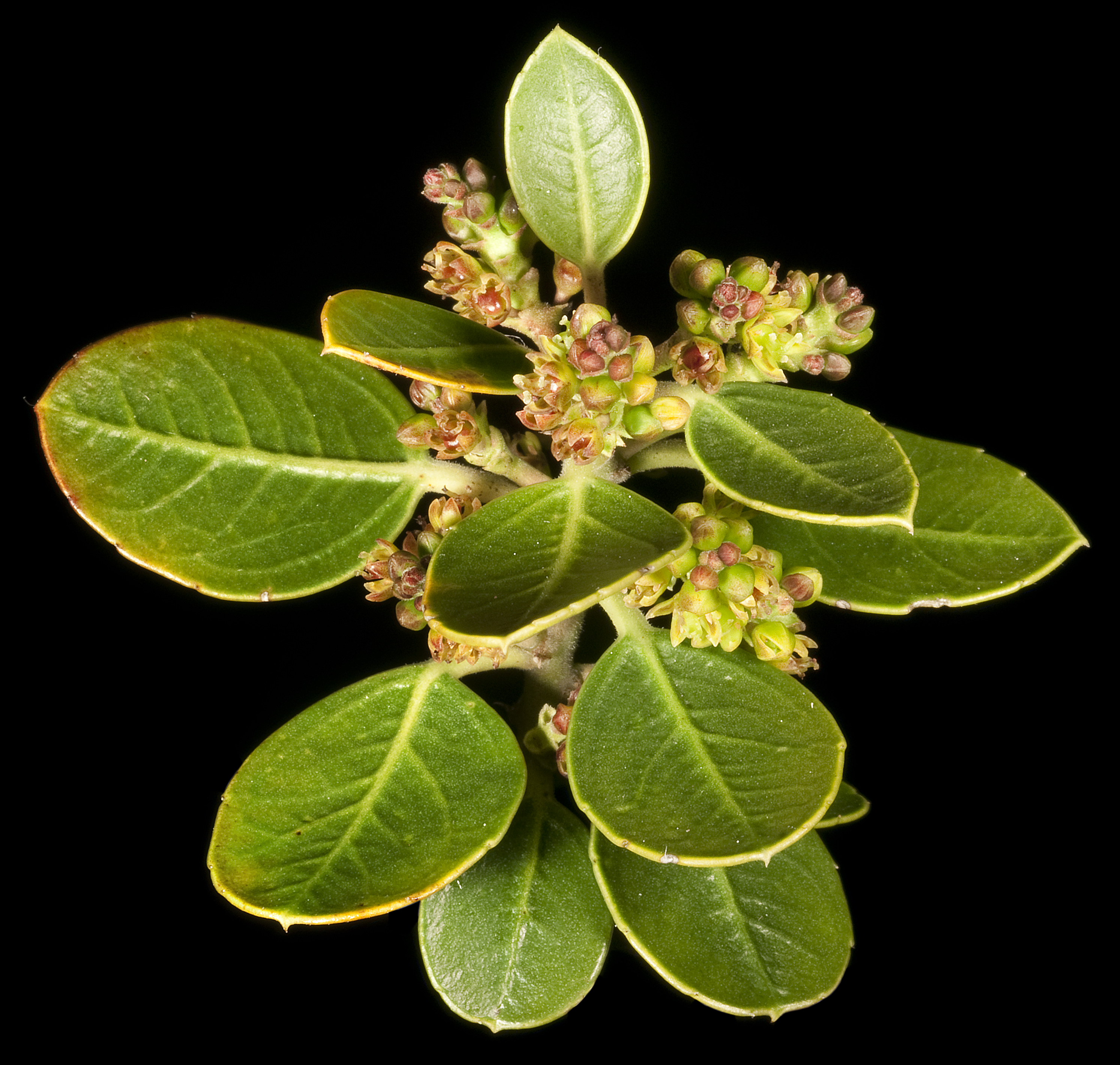

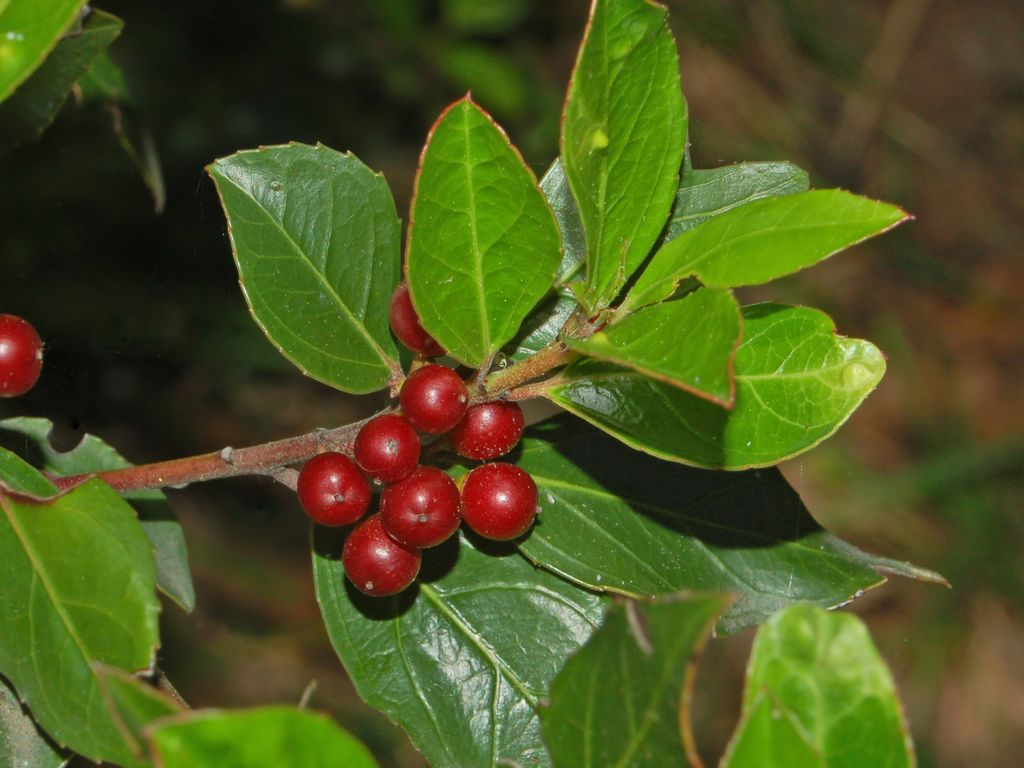
- Flowering and fruiting sprigs with foliage

Conservation status
- Least Concern (IUCN 3.1)

Scientific classification
- Kingdom: Plantae
- Clade: Tracheophytes
- Clade: Angiosperms
- Clade: Eudicots
- Clade: Rosids
- Order: Rosales
- Family: Rhamnaceae
- Genus: Rhamnus
- Species: R. alaternus

Binomial name
- Rhamnus alaternus L.

Subspecies
- Rhamnus alaternus subsp. alaternus; Rhamnus alaternus subsp. munozgarmendiae Rivas Mart. & J.M.Pizarro; Rhamnus alaternus subsp. pendula (Pamp.) Jafri

Synonyms
- Synonymy: Rhamnus collina Salisb. synonyms of subsp. alaternus: Celastrus hamelii Spreng.; Alaternus angustifolia Mill.; Alaternus balearica (Duhamel ex Pers.) Raf.; Alaternus glabra Mill.; Alaternus hispanicus Steud.; Alaternus integrifolius Raf.; Alaternus lanceolatus Raf.; Alaternus latifolia Mill.; Alaternus ovatus Raf.; Alaternus phylica Mill.; Alaternus rotundifolia Steud.; Alaternus sempervirens Borkh., nom. illeg. homonym. post.; Alaternus sempervirens var. angustifolia (Mill.) Borkh.; Alaternus sempervirens var. latifolia (Mill.) Borkh.; Alaternus variegata Steud.; Rhamnus alaternoides Candargy, fossil name.; Rhamnus alaternus var. acutifolia Debeaux & É.Rev., not validly publ.; Rhamnus alaternus f. angustifolia (Mill.) Fiori; Rhamnus alaternus var. angustifolia (Mill.) Aiton; Rhamnus alaternus f. arborescentis Laguna, not validly publ.; Rhamnus alaternus f. argenteovariegata (Weston) Rehder; Rhamnus alaternus var. balearica DC., nom. illeg.; Rhamnus alaternus var. balearica (Duhamel ex Pers.) Mart.; Rhamnus alaternus var. balearica Duhamel ex Pers.; Rhamnus alaternus var. boteyi Sennen; Rhamnus alaternus var. chlorocarpus P.P.Ferrer, M.Pereira, Viciano & E.Laguna; Rhamnus alaternus f. clusii (Willd.) Cout.; Rhamnus alaternus var. clusii (Willd.) Texidor; Rhamnus alaternus var. elliptica Poir. ex K.Koch; Rhamnus alaternus f. fruticosa Willk. ex C.Vicioso; Rhamnus alaternus var. gebelensis Andr.; Rhamnus alaternus var. genuina Texidor, not validly publ.; Rhamnus alaternus f. genuina Magnier ex Cout., not validly publ.; Rhamnus alaternus var. glabra (Mill.) Steud.; Rhamnus alaternus var. hederacea Delort ex Loret & Barrandon; Rhamnus alaternus var. hispanica Dum.Cours.; Rhamnus alaternus var. integrifolia Orph. ex Boiss.; Rhamnus alaternus f. integrifolia (Orph. ex Boiss.) Cout.; Rhamnus alaternus var. latifolia (Mill.) Aiton; Rhamnus alaternus var. latifolia Cambess., nom. illeg. homonym. post.; Rhamnus alaternus f. latifolia (Mill.) Paol.; Rhamnus alaternus var. laurifolia Pourr. ex Texidor; Rhamnus alaternus f. longifolia Emb. & Maire, nom. illeg.; Rhamnus alaternus var. longifolia Rouy, nom. illeg. homonym. post.; Rhamnus alaternus f. macrophylla Cout.; Rhamnus alaternus var. microphylla Nyman, nom. illeg. superfl.; Rhamnus alaternus var. minor Pourr. ex Texidor; Rhamnus alaternus f. minor (Pourr. ex Texidor) Texidor, not validly publ.; Rhamnus alaternus var. minutidens Sennen, nom. nud.; Rhamnus alaternus f. neoparvifolia Rivas Mart. & J.M.Pizarro; Rhamnus alaternus var. obovata (Timb.-Lagr. & Fages) Rouy; Rhamnus alaternus subvar. obovata Timb.-Lagr. & Fages; Rhamnus alaternus f. obovata (Timb.-Lagr. & Fages) Cout.; Rhamnus alaternus var. orbiculata Sennen & Pau; Rhamnus alaternus subsp. parvifolia Arcang.; Rhamnus alaternus f. parvifolia (Arcang.) Fiori; Rhamnus alaternus var. parvifolia (Arcang.) Lange; Rhamnus alaternus var. phylica (Mill.) Steud.; Rhamnus alaternus var. picenensis (Duval-Jouve) Magnier; Rhamnus alaternus subsp. picenensis (Duval-Jouve) Nyman; Rhamnus alaternus var. porquerollensis Shuttlew.; Rhamnus alaternus var. rotundifolia K.Koch, nom. illeg. homonym. post.; Rhamnus alaternus f. tangerina Pau; Rhamnus alaternus f. tournefortii (Rouy ex Magnier) Cout.; Rhamnus alaternus var. tournefortii Rouy ex Magnier; Rhamnus alaternus var. vulgaris DC.; Rhamnus angustifolia (Mill.) K.Koch, nom. superfl.; Rhamnus balearica (Duhamel ex Pers.) Dum.Cours.; Rhamnus balearica Link, nom. illeg.; Rhamnus clusii Willd.; Rhamnus communis Weston; Rhamnus communis var. argenteovariegata Weston; Rhamnus communis var. aureovariegata Weston; Rhamnus communis var. maculatus Weston; Rhamnus coriacea Buch; Rhamnus hederacea (Delort ex Loret & Barrandon) Gaut.; Rhamnus hispanica K.Koch; Rhamnus jacobi-salvadorii O.Bolòs & Vigo; Rhamnus myrtifolia var. hederacea (Delort ex Loret & Barrandon) Sennen; Rhamnus phylica (Mill.) Bubani; Rhamnus picenensis Duval-Jouve; Rhamnus racemosa Duhamel; Rhamnus rotundifolia Dum.Cours., nom. illeg. homonym. post.; Rhamnus tripolitana Engl. synonyms of subsp. pendula: Rhamnus pendula Pamp.

= Rhamnus alaternus =

Mediterranean buckthorn

Species of flowering plant

Rhamnus alaternus is a species of flowering plant in the buckthorn family Rhamnaceae, known by the common names Italian buckthorn or Mediterranean buckthorn. It is a hardy medium-sized evergreen shrub with fragrant flowers.

== Etymology ==
The specific Latin name alaternus, is from the Latin word for the plant. Its origin is obscure but is often suggested to be of Etruscan or pre-Indo-European Mediterranean origin.

== Description ==
Rhamnus alaternus is an evergreen shrub 1–5 metres (3 ft 3 in – 16 ft 5 in) high. The stems have reddish bark and pubescent young branches, rounded and compact foliage with alternating leaves, 2–6 centimetres (0.79–2.36 in) long, sometimes nearly opposite, oval or lanceolate, leathery, shiny green, yellowish-green underneath.

The small fragrant flowers are gathered in a short axillary yellow-green raceme. The flowering period extends from February to April. Fruits are obovoidal red-brownish drupes of about 3–4 millimetres (0.12–0.16 in), containing from 2 to 4 seeds. The drupes darken to black when ripe.

== Distribution and habitat ==
This species is widespread in thermophilic evergreen bush and scrubland of the Mediterranean climate regions, from Gran Canaria, Morocco and Portugal in the west, to the Levant in the east, from sea level up to 1,300 m (4,300 ft) elevation.

== Invasiveness ==
In Australia, where it was introduced as a garden shrub, it has become a serious invasive woody weed in many areas, especially coastal parts of SE Australia. Here it displaces native shrubs of similar size such as the sea box, Alyxia buxifolia (an endemic plant which had an important medicinal role for aboriginal people). It prevents subshrubs and herbaceous ground cover native plants from surviving due to the heavy shade and competition for moisture and nutrients. It can form dense thickets with very low biodiversity.

== Cultivation ==
This species is cultivated as an ornamental garden shrub, valued for its glossy evergreen leaves and red berries. The variegated cultivar 'Argenteovariegata' has gained the Royal Horticultural Society's Award of Garden Merit.

== Subspecies ==
Three subspecies are accepted:

- Rhamnus alaternus subsp. alaternus
- Rhamnus alaternus subsp. munozgarmendiae Rivas Mart. & J.M.Pizarro
- Rhamnus alaternus subsp. pendula (Pamp.) Jafri

== Gallery ==
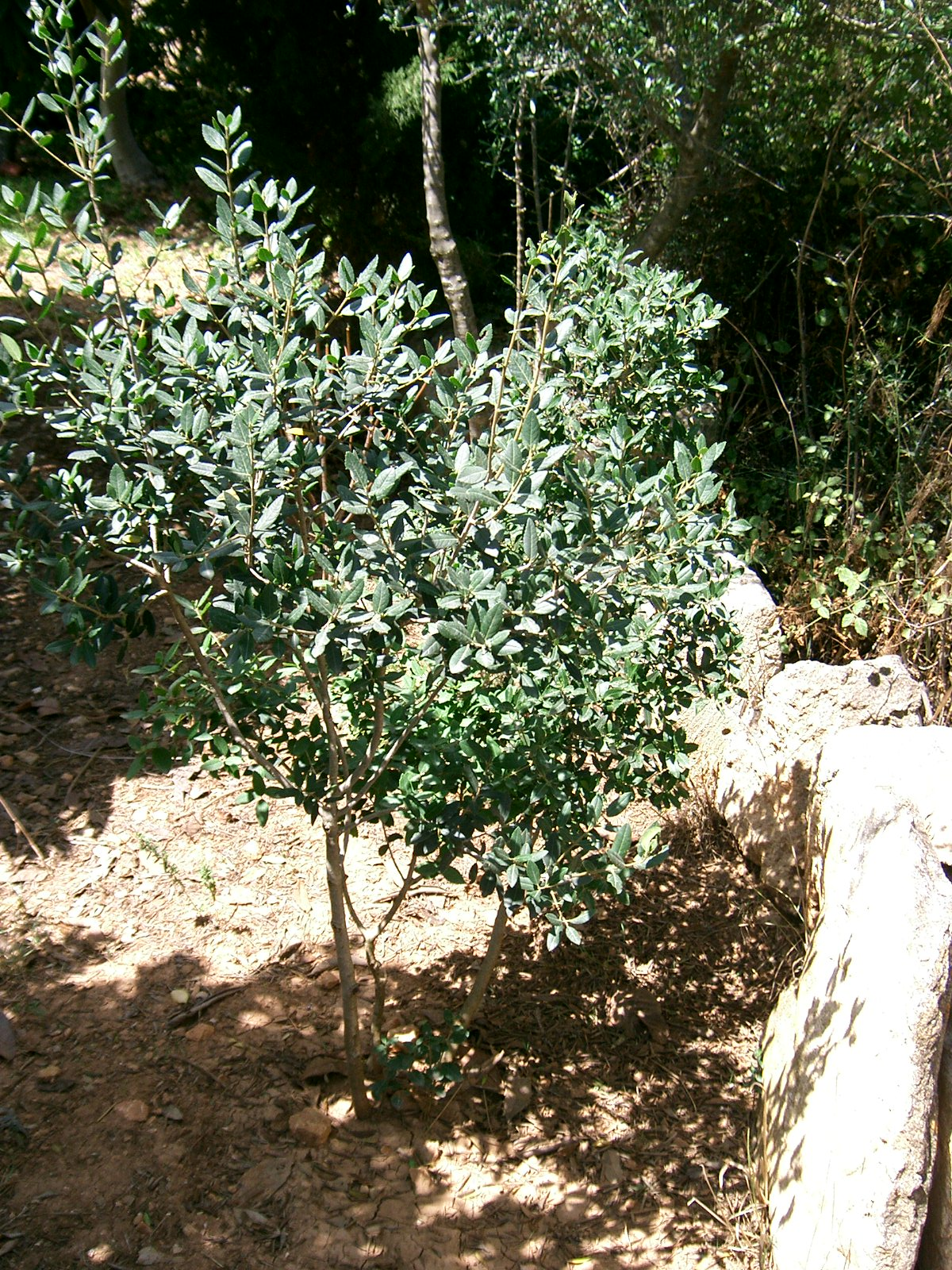
Habit in Mallorca

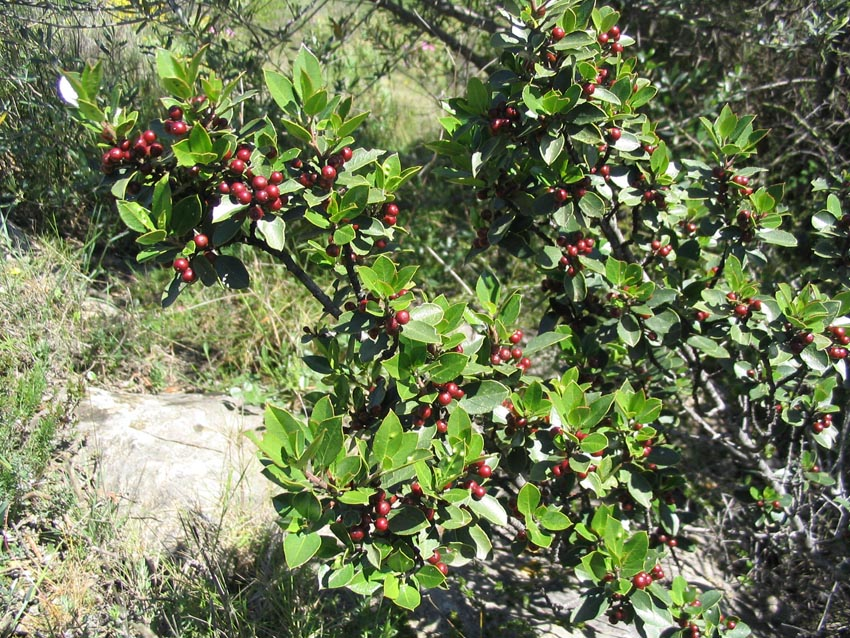
Habit in France

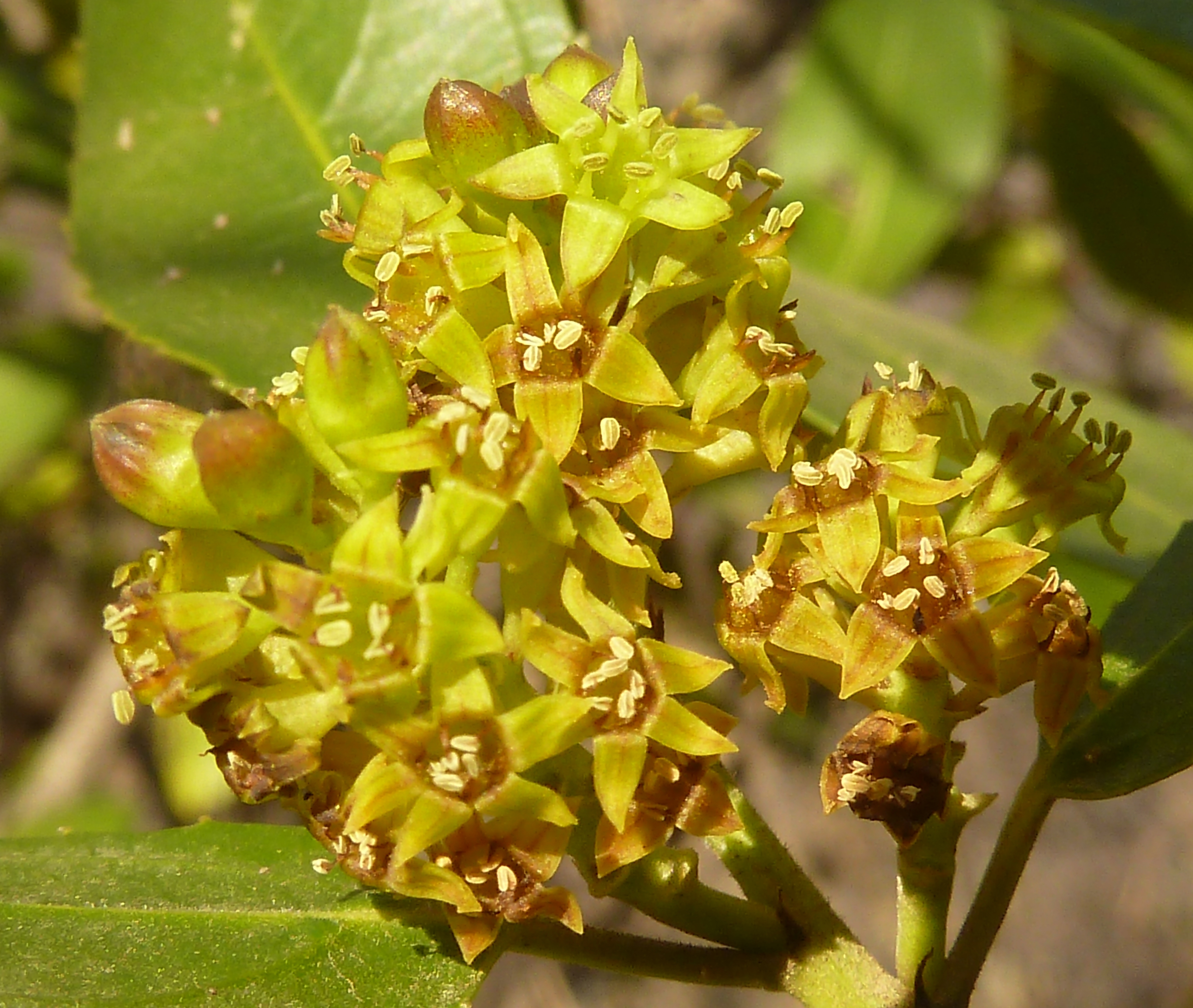
Male flowers, South Africa

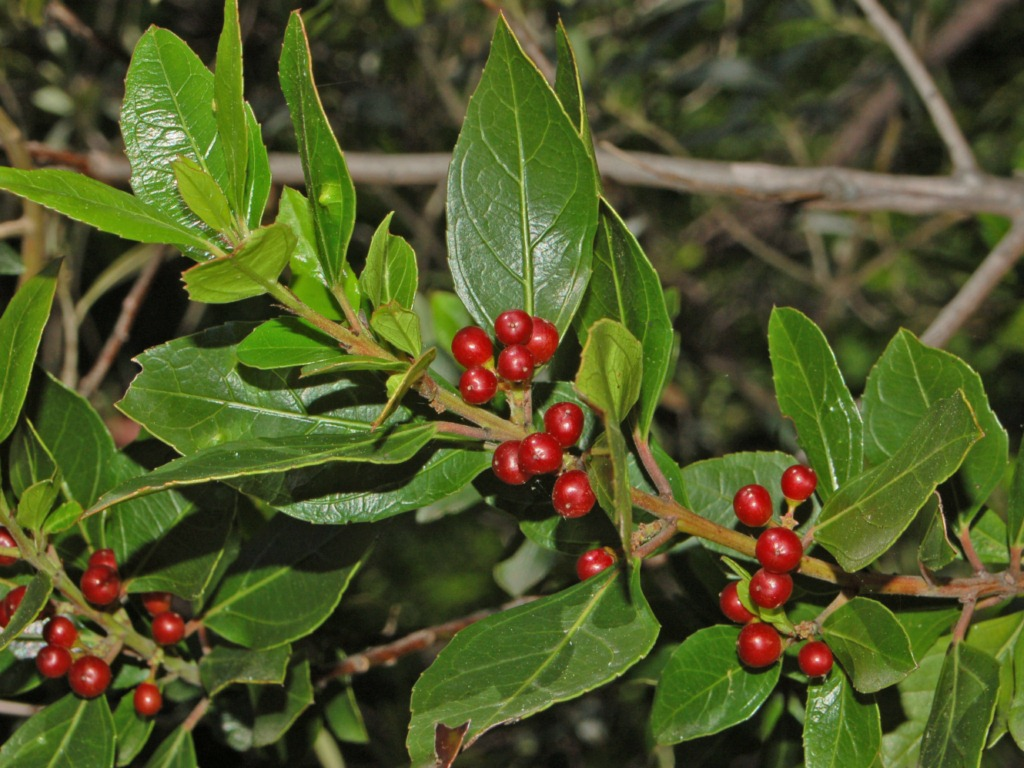
Foliage and fruit, Italy
