= Giorgio Sommer =

German photographer (1834–1914)

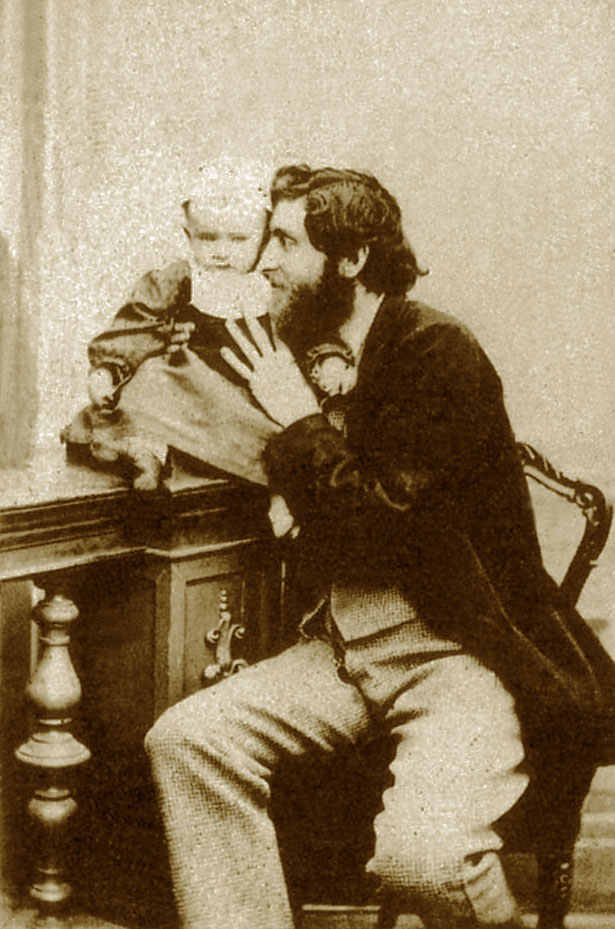
- Born: 2 September 1834; Frankfurt, German Confederation
- Died: 7 August 1914 (aged 79); Naples, Kingdom of Italy
- Occupation: Photographer

Giorgio Sommer (2 September 1834 – 7 August 1914) was one of Europe's most important and prolific photographers of the 19th century. Active from 1857 to 1888, he produced thousands of images of archeological ruins, landscapes, art objects, and portraits.

Sommer was born in Frankfurt (modern-day Germany), where he studied business. He opened his first photography studio in Switzerland, where he made relief images of mountains for the Swiss government. In 1856, Sommer moved his business to Naples and in 1866 formed a partnership with fellow German photographer Edmondo Behles, who owned a studio in Rome. Operating from their respective Naples and Rome studios, Sommer and Behles became one of the largest and most prolific photography concerns in Italy.

He held studios in Naples at:

- Strada di Chiaia 168
- Via Monte di Dio 4 and 8
- Piazza della Vittoria

Sommer's catalog included images from the Vatican Museums, the National Archeological Museum at Naples, the Roman ruins at Pompeii, as well as street and architectural scenes of Naples, Florence, Rome, Capri, and Sicily. Most notably, Sommer published his comprehensive album Dintorni di Napoli, which contained over one hundred images of everyday scenes in Naples. In April 1872, he documented a very large eruption of Mount Vesuvius in a series of stunning photographs.

Sommer and Behles exhibited extensively and earned numerous honours and prizes for their work (London: 1862, Paris: 1867, Vienna: 1873, Nuremberg: 1885). At one time, Sommer was appointed official photographer to King Victor Emmanuel II of Italy.

Sommer was involved in every aspect of the photography business. He published his own images that he sold in his studios and to customers across Europe. In later years, he photographed custom images for book illustrations, as well as printing his own albums and postcards. Sommer worked in all the popular formats of his day: carte de visite, stereoview, and large albumen prints (approximately 8 × 10) which were sold individually and in bound albums.

The partnership with Behles ended in 1874, after which each photographer continued his own business. In Naples, Sommer opened a total of four additional studios: at No. 4 and No. 8 Monte di Dio, No. 5 Magazzino S. Caterina, and a last at Piazza della Vittoria.

Sommer died in Naples in 1914.

== Gallery ==
Selected works

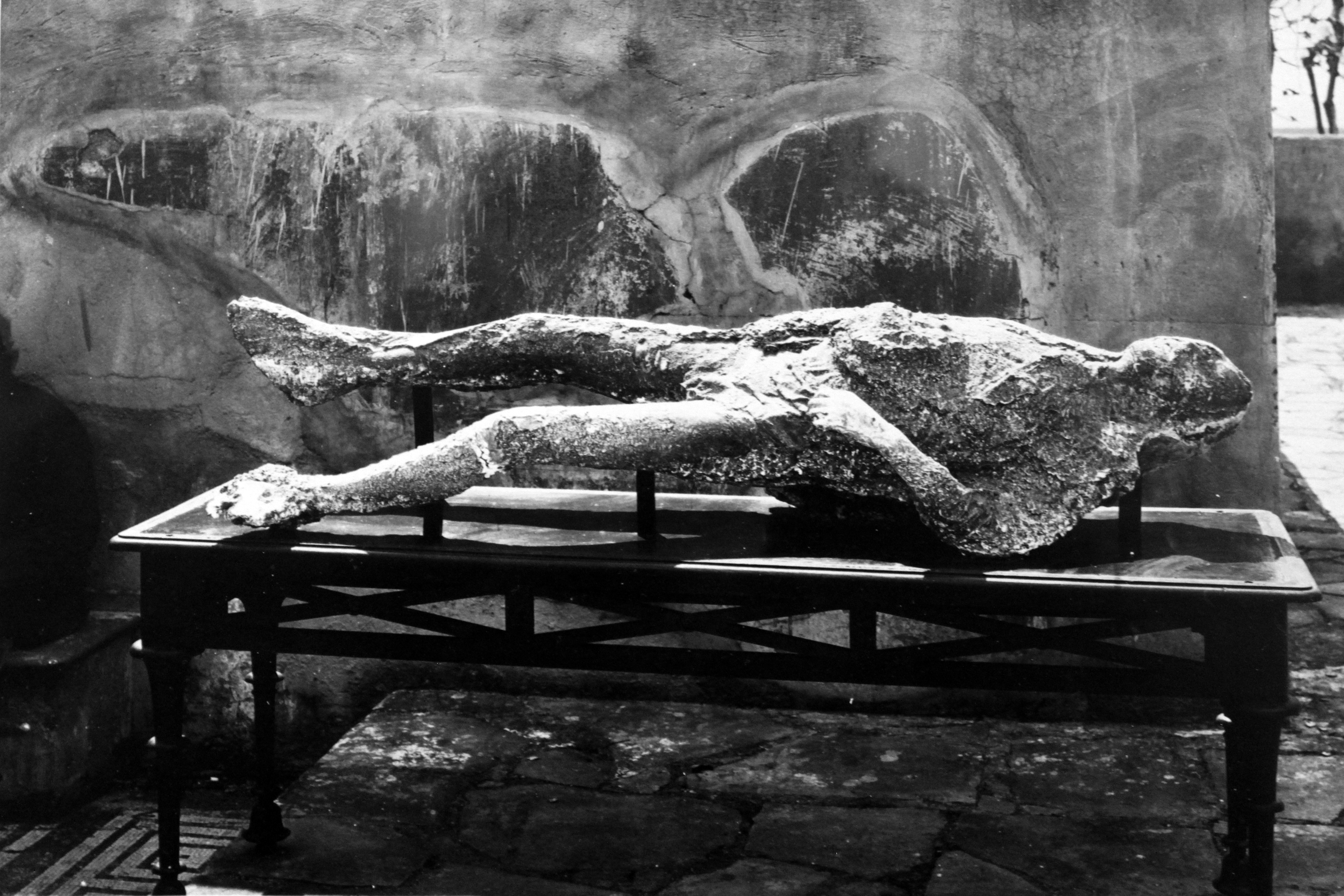
Pompeii: Human Casts found on 5 February 1863, Städel

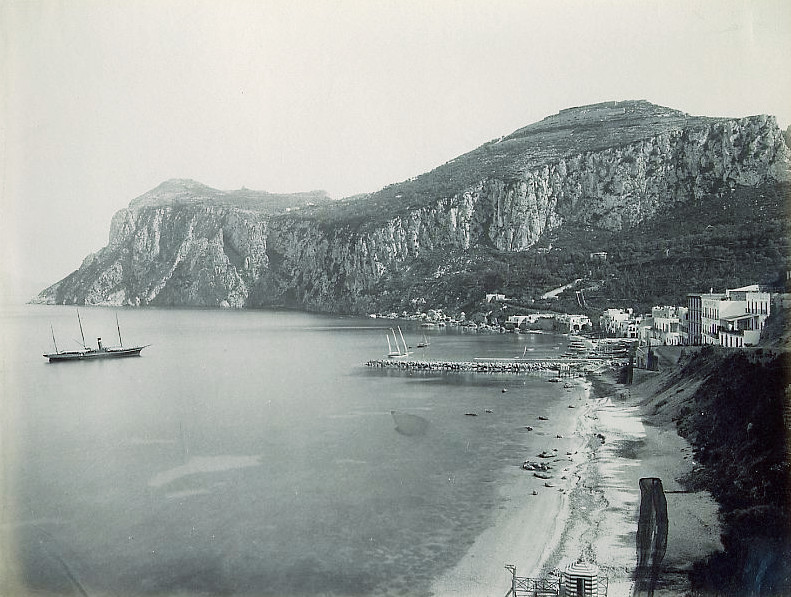
Marina Grande, Capri, c. 1880

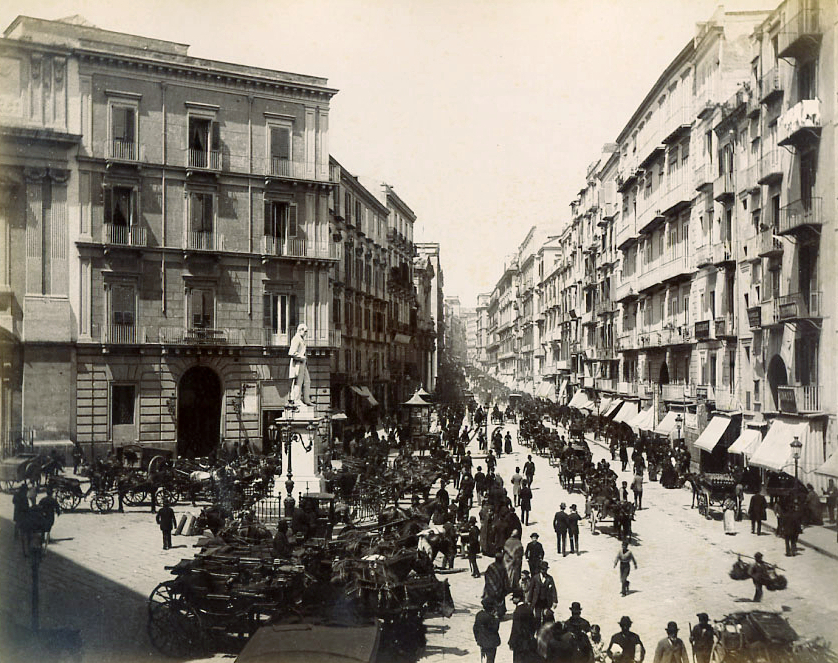
Naples, 1880s

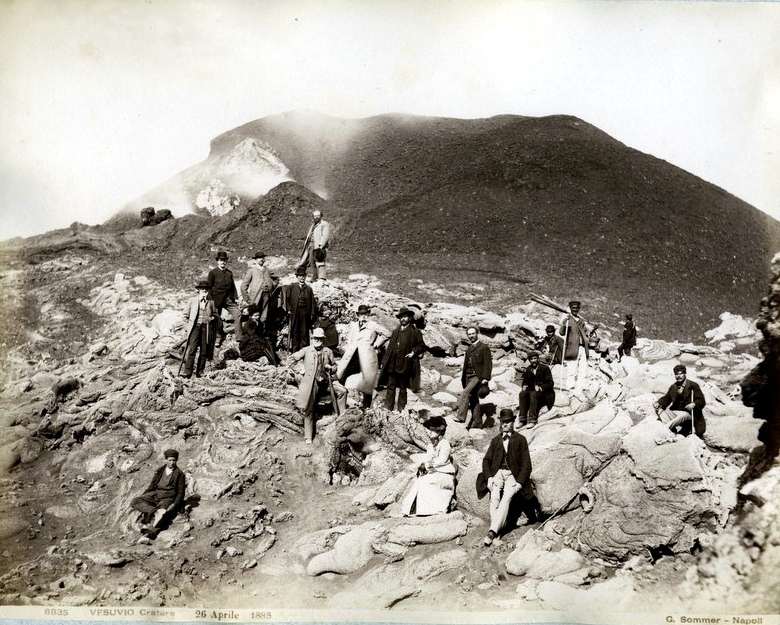
Crater of the Vesuvius, 26 April 1883 (Catalogue # 8935)

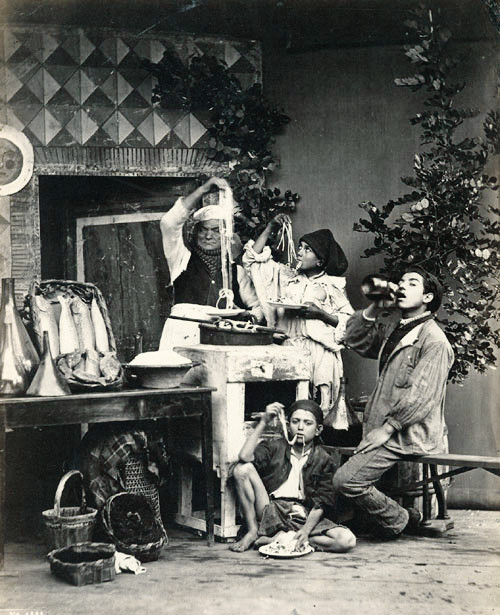
Spaghetti eaters (Naples), before 1886

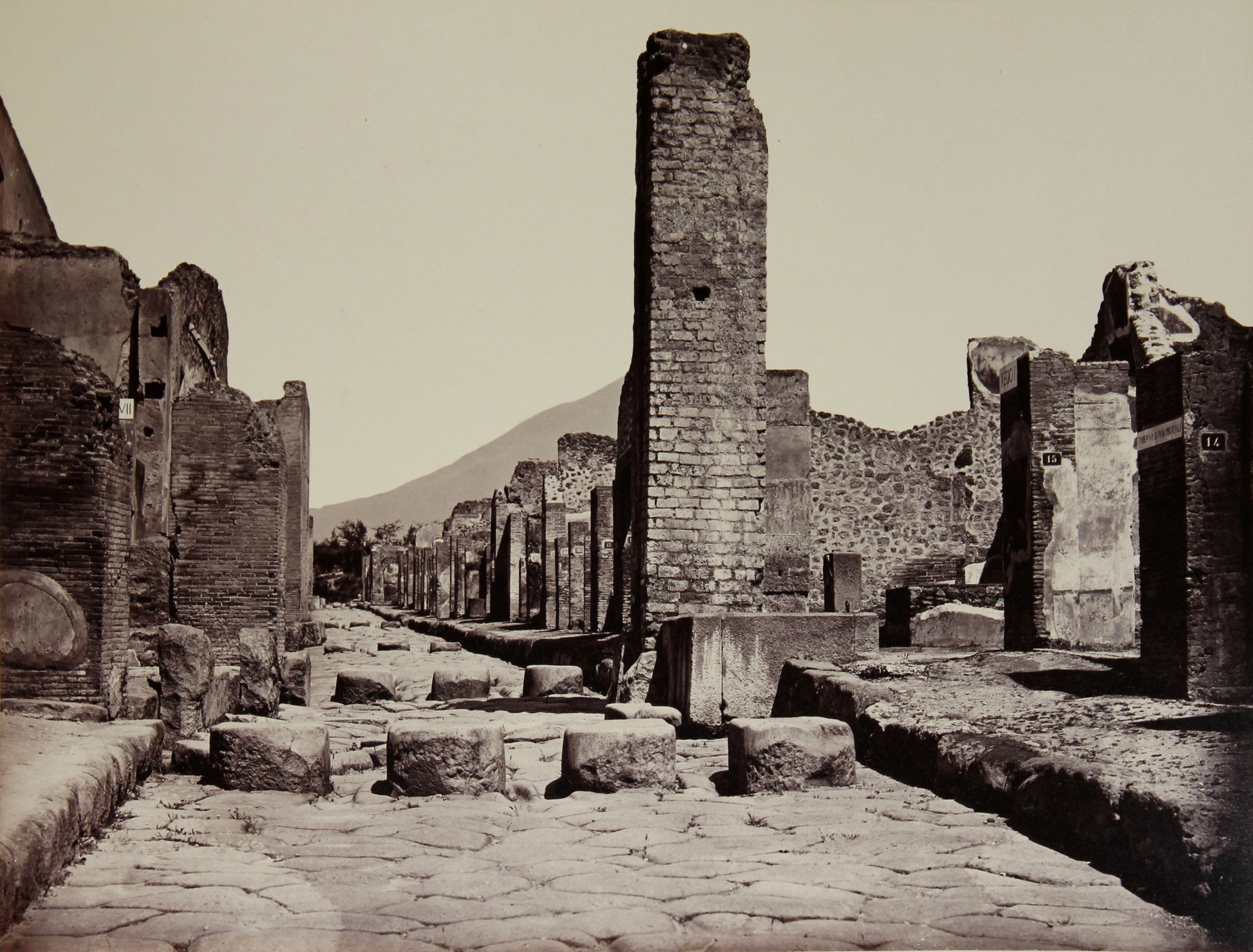
Stabbia Street (Pompeii), c. 1870

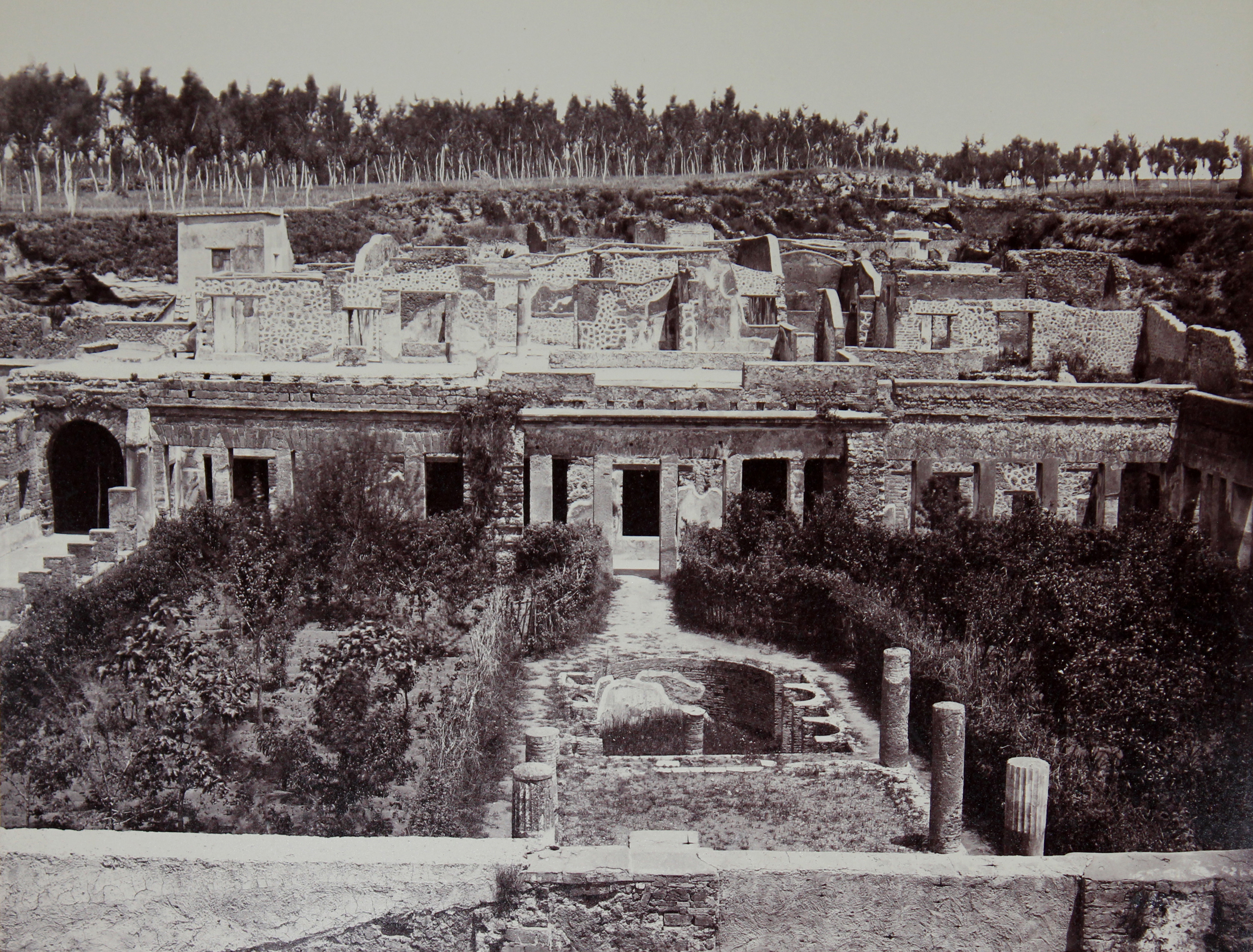
Doimede's house (Pompeii), c. 1870

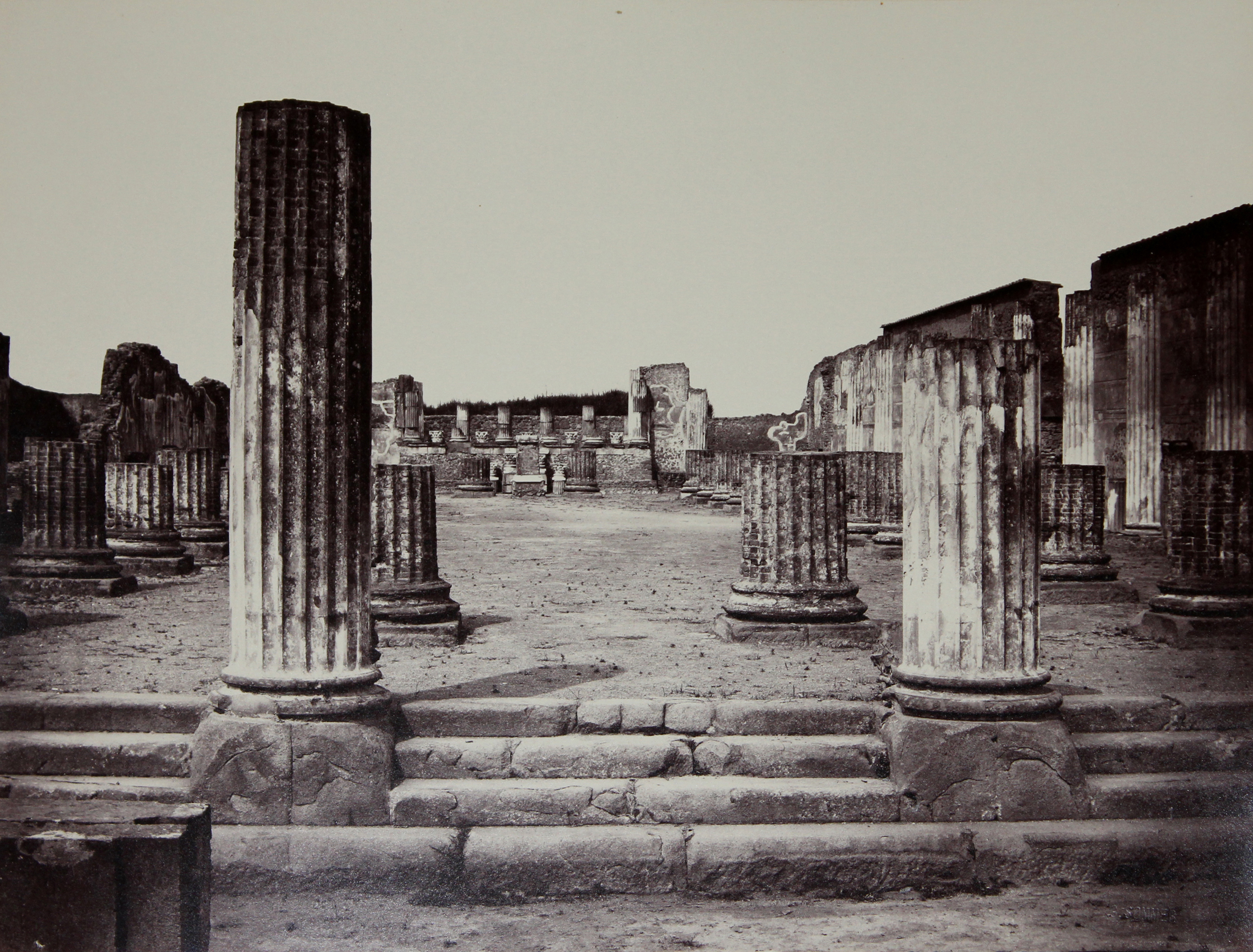
Basilica (Pompeii), c. 1870

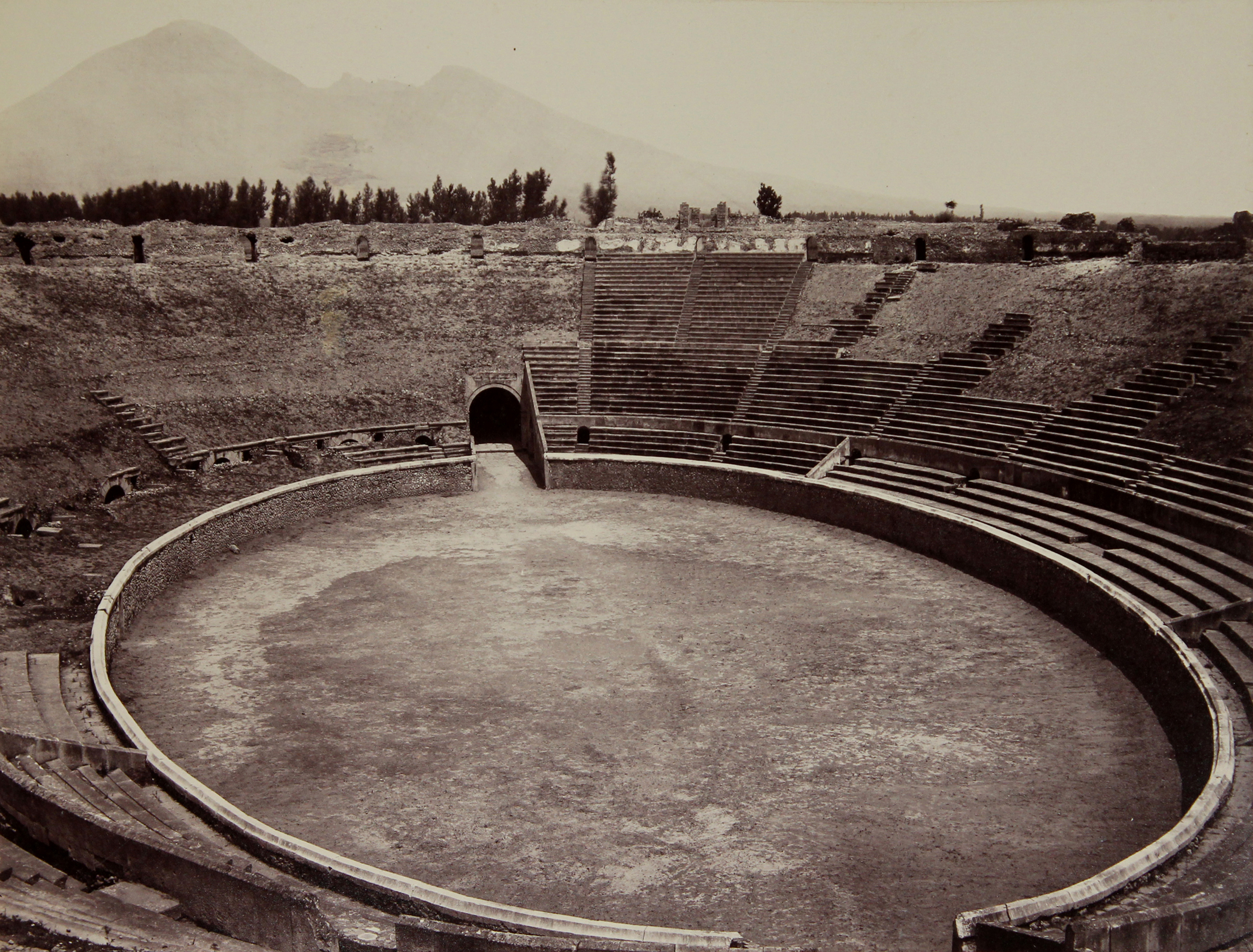
Amphitheatre (Pompeii), c. 1870

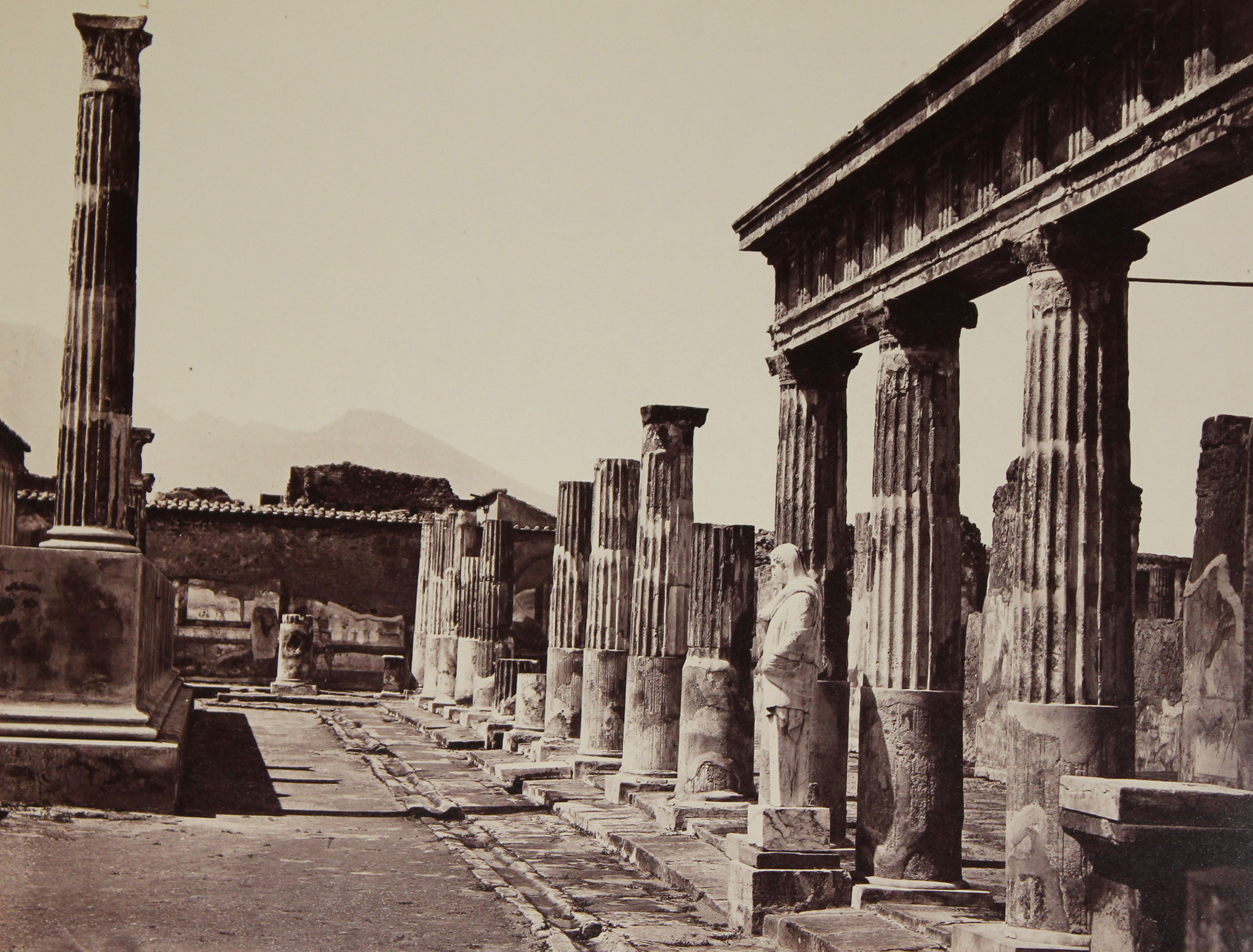
The Temple of Venus (Pompeii), c. 1870

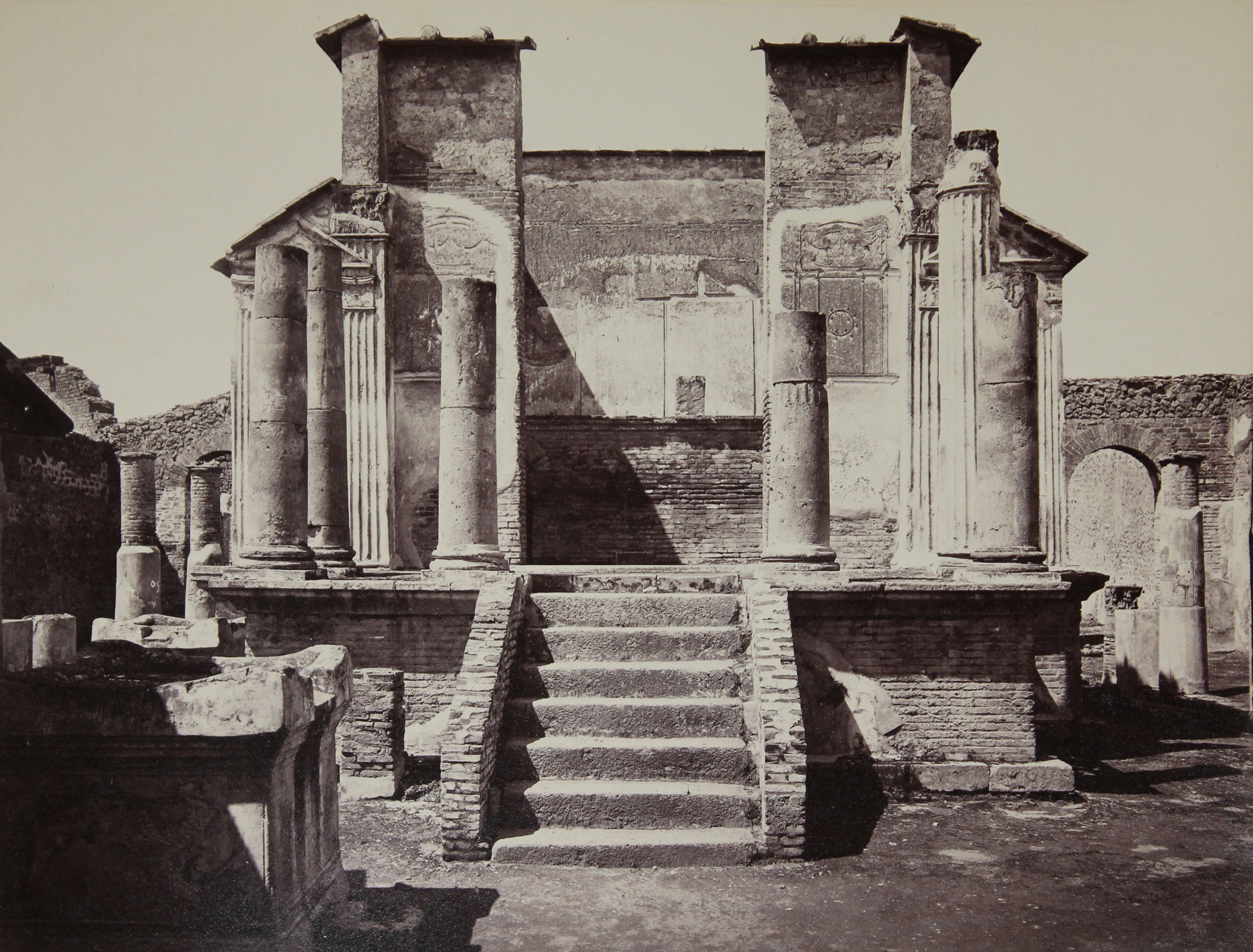
The Temple of Isis (Pompeii), c. 1870

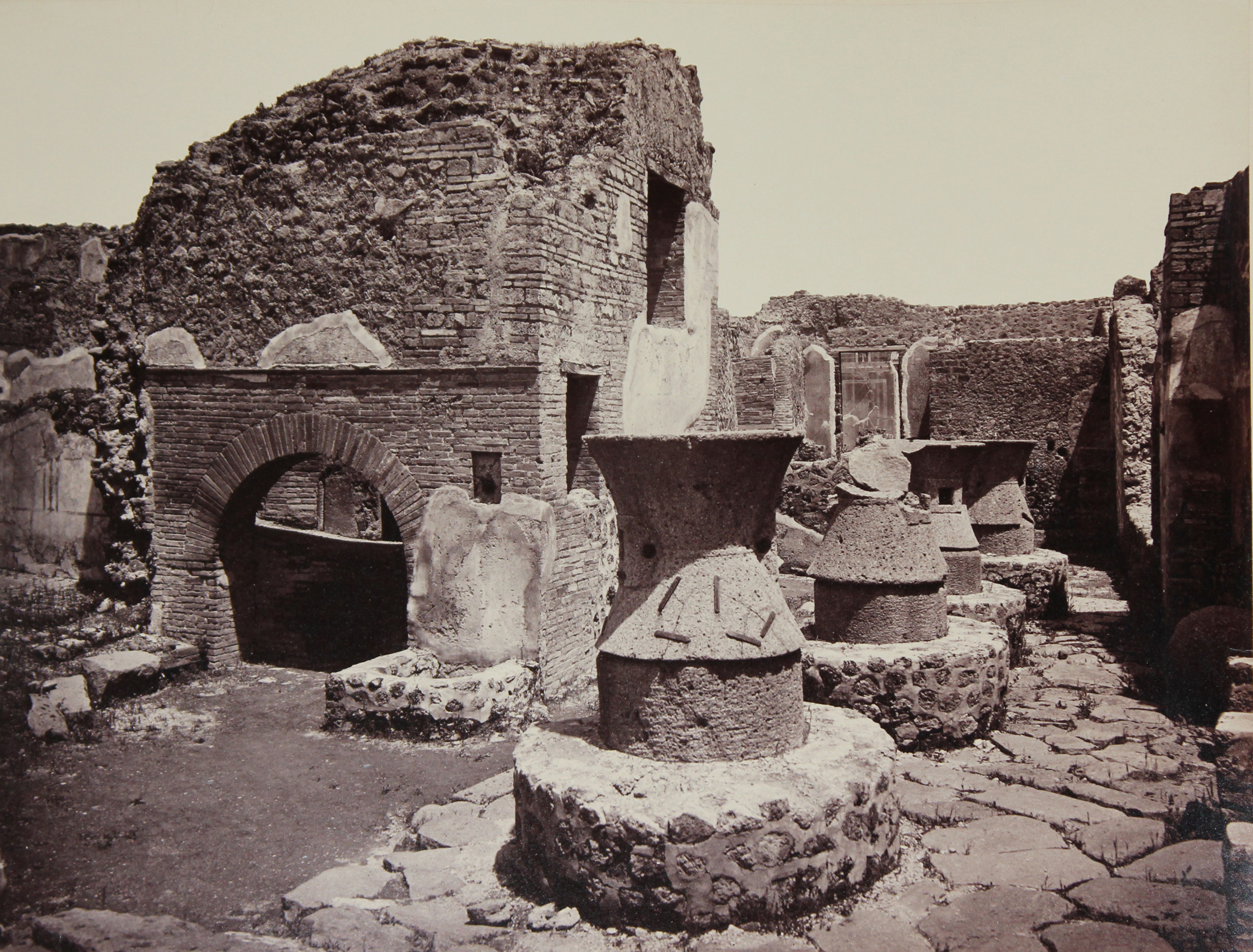
The remains of Numerius Popidius Priscus' bakery (Pompeii), c. 1870

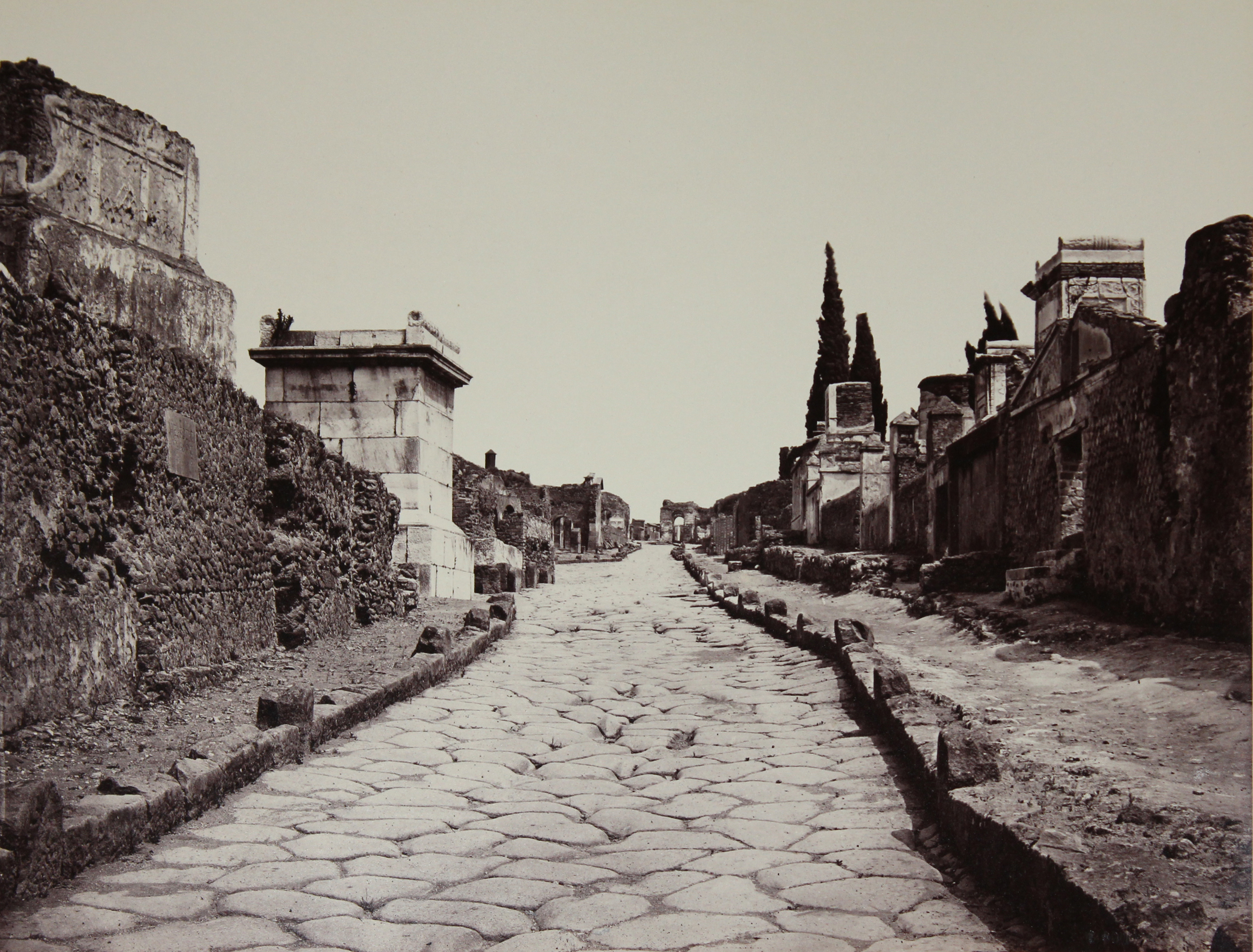
Street of tombs (Pompeii), c. 1840

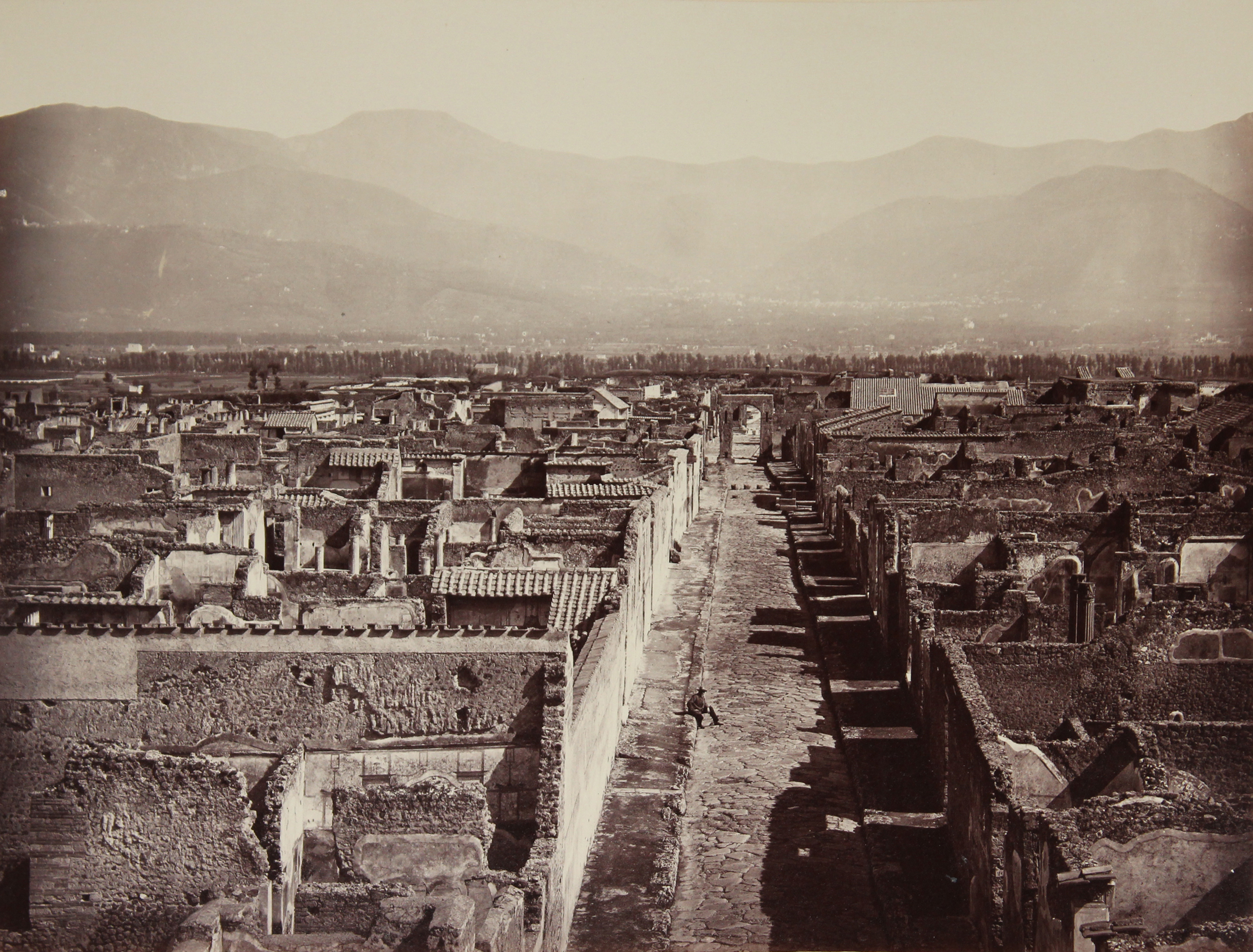
Panorama of Pompeii with Mount Vesuvius in the background (Pompeii), c. 1870

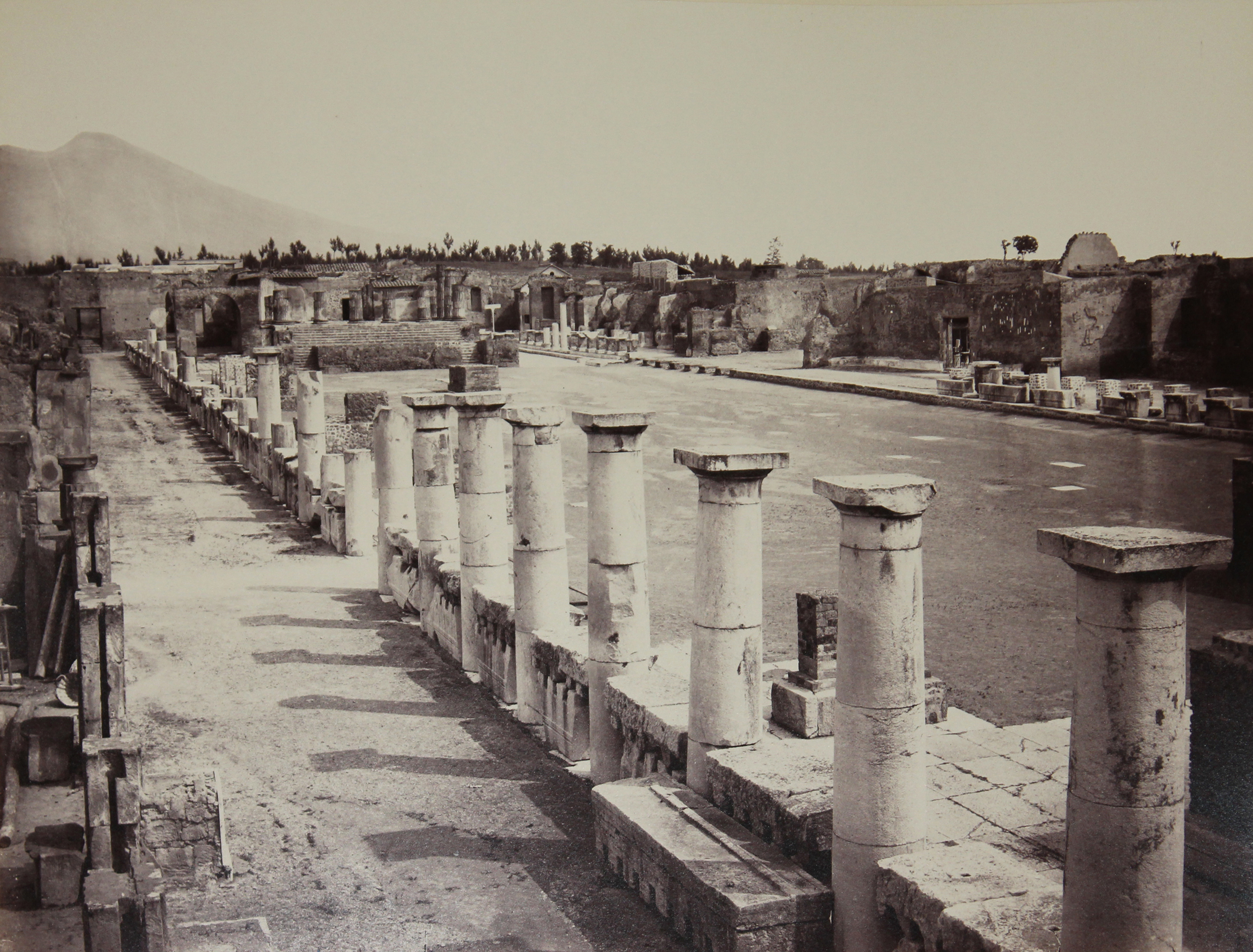
Panorama Forum Rivile (Pompeii), c. 1870

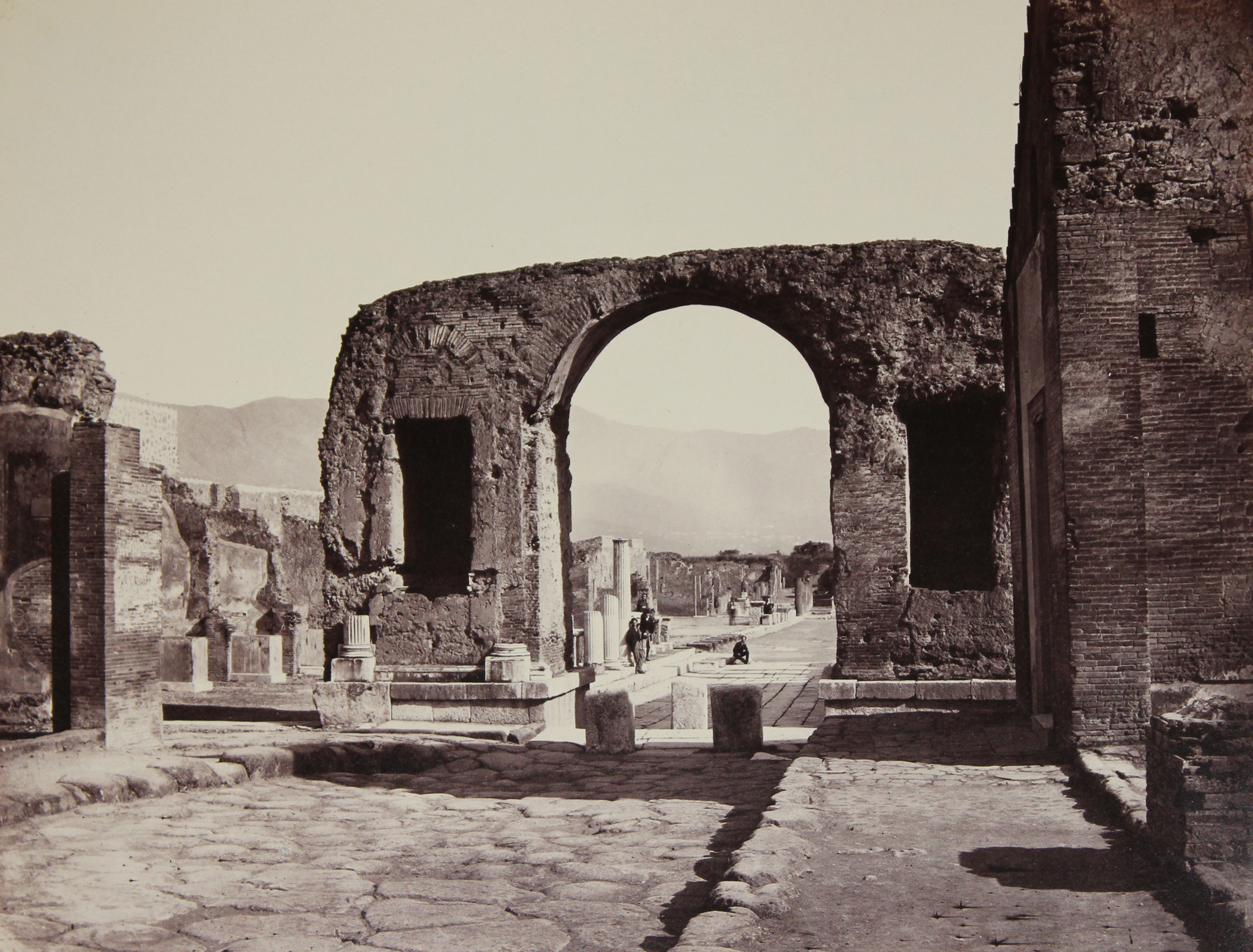
Forum (Pompeii), c. 1870

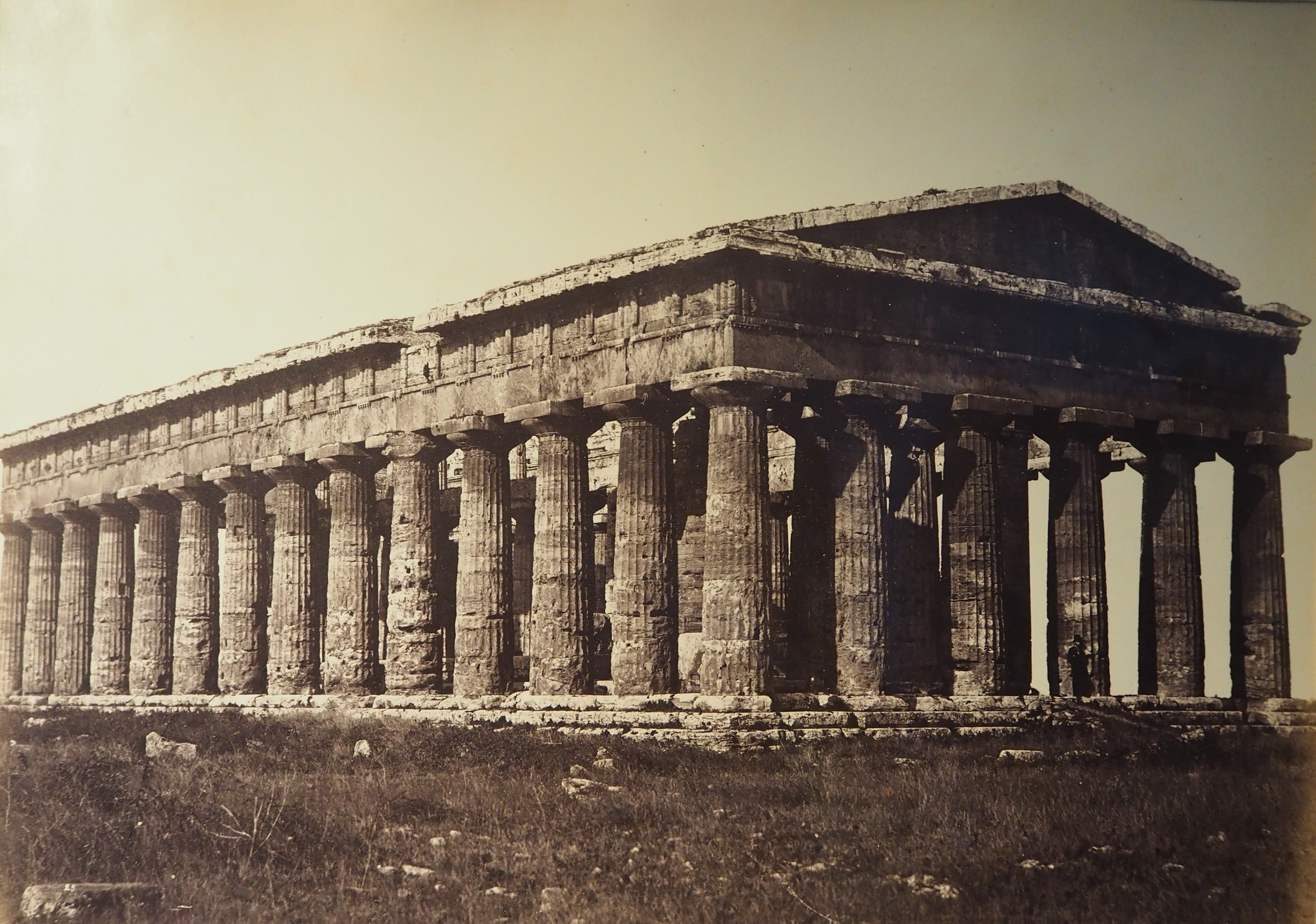
The Temple of Neptune, c. 1854
