= Sommer and Behles =

Italian photography studio

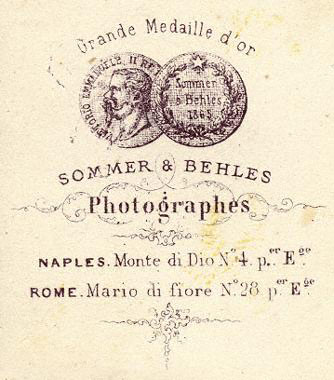
Trademark of the Sommer and Behels studio

Sommer and Behles was a 19th-century Italian photography studio created by the partnership of photographers Giorgio Sommer (1834-1914) and Edmondo Behles (1841-1921). Studios were located in Rome at No. 28 Mario di Fiori, and in Naples at No. 4 Monte di Dio. Each photographer had independent careers and studios prior to and following the partnership, which began in 1867 and was dissolved in 1874.
