= Edmondo Behles =

German photographer

- Born: Edmund Behles; July 21, 1841; Frankfurt am Main, German Confederation
- Died: November 23, 1921 (aged 80); Rome, Italy
- Occupation: Photographer
- Known for: Views of Rome and antiquities; Sommer & Behles studio

Edmondo Behles (21 July 1841 – 23 November 1921) was a German photographer. He is especially known for his photographic studio known as Sommer and Behles in Rome, and for his work depicting city views, ancient monuments, and classical sculptures.

== Career ==
Behles settled in Rome by the late 1850s and worked at the partnership with photographer Giorgio Sommer operated through the early 1870s and sold prints. His photographs focus on vedute of Rome and Naples, archaeological sites and reproductions of classical statuary.

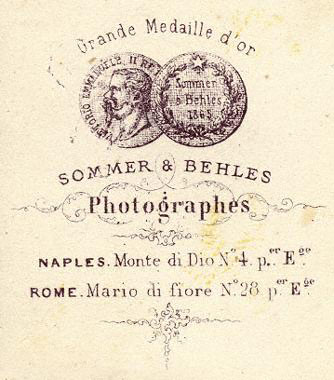
Poster of the Sommer & Behles company

== Collections ==
Works by Sommer & Behles are held at the J. Paul Getty Museum, the Städel Museum, and the Toledo Museum of Art.
