= 1931 in literature =

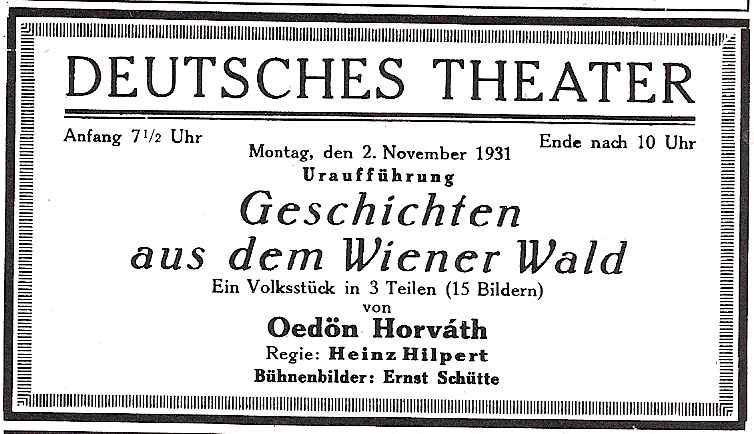
Tales from the Vienna Woods by Ödön von Horváth. Program notes from the 1931 world premiere.

This article contains information about the literary events and publications of 1931.

== Events ==
- January 10 – A rare copy of Edgar Allan Poe's Al Aaraaf, Tamerlane, and Other Poems and first editions of The Scarlet Letter and Moby-Dick are stolen from New York Public Library by Samuel Dupree, on behalf of a crooked New York antiquarian book dealer, Harry Gold.
- January 26 – The play Green Grow the Lilacs by Cherokee playwright Lynn Riggs, opens on Broadway. It is later adapted as Oklahoma! by Rodgers and Hammerstein.
- March 27 – The English novelist Arnold Bennett dies of typhoid in London, shortly after a visit to Paris, where he drank local water in an attempt to prove it was safe.
- April 11 – Gerald Brenan and Gamel Woolsey make a form of marriage in Rome.
- June 1 – The Near v. Minnesota case in the Supreme Court of the United States affirms the principle that prior restraint is unconstitutional.
- July 4 – James Joyce marries his long-time partner Nora Barnacle at Kensington register office in London.
- October 4 – The Dick Tracy comic strip first appears, created by cartoonist Chester Gould.
- October 5 – The first U.K. performance of Oscar Wilde's tragedy Salome (1891) is given at the Savoy Theatre, London, with Nancy Price as producer and as Herodias, and her daughter Joan Maude in the title role.
- November – Federico García Lorca is appointed by the leftist Second Spanish Republic as director of a touring theatre company, Teatro Universitario La Barraca (The Shack), charged with taking a portable stage into rural areas to introduce audiences to classical Spanish theatre without charge.
- unknown dates
  - The publisher Hamish Hamilton is founded by Jamie Hamilton in London.
  - Alice's Adventures in Wonderland is banned in Hunan, China, for anthropomorphism.
  - The Marquis de Sade's The 120 Days of Sodom (Les 120 Journées de Sodome), written in 1785, has its first publication in a scholarly edition as a literary text.

== New books ==
=== Fiction ===
- Shmuel Yosef Agnon – The Bridal Canopy
- Margery Allingham – Police at the Funeral
- Roberto Arlt – Los lanzallamas (The Flame-Throwers)
- E. F. Benson – Mapp and Lucia
- Theodora Benson – Which Way?
- Arna Bontemps – God Sends Sunday
- Pearl S. Buck – The Good Earth
- Nellie Campobello – Cartucho
- John Dickson Carr – Castle Skull
- Willa Cather – Shadows on the Rock
- Sigurd Christiansen – To levende og en død
- Agatha Christie – The Sittaford Mystery
- N. D. Cocea – Vinul de viață lungă
- J.J. Connington
  - The Boathouse Riddle
  - The Sweepstake Murders
- Freeman Wills Crofts – Mystery in the Channel
- A. J. Cronin – Hatter's Castle
- E. E. Cummings – CIOPW
- Sergiu Dan – Dragoste și moarte în provincie
- Clemence Dane – Broome Stages
- Detection Club – The Floating Admiral
- Pierre Drieu La Rochelle – Will O' the Wisp
- Lord Dunsany – The Travel Tales of Mr. Joseph Jorkens
- Joseph Jefferson Farjeon – The House Opposite
- William Faulkner
  - Sanctuary
  - These 13
- Carlo Emilio Gadda – La madonna dei filosofi
- Anthony Gilbert – The Case Against Andrew Fane
- Maxim Gorky – The Life of Klim Samgin (Жизнь Клима Самгина, Zhizn' Klima Samgina; third volume, translated as Other Fires)
- Dashiell Hammett – The Glass Key
- James Hanley – Boy
- Serge-Simon Held – La Mort du fer (The Death of Iron)
- Georgette Heyer – The Conqueror
- Robert Hichens – The First Lady Brendon
- James Hilton (published under the name "Glen Trevor") – Murder at School
- Knud Holmboe – Desert Encounter
- E. M. Hull – The Captive of the Sahara
- Fannie Hurst – Back Street
- Francis Iles – Malice Aforethought
- Carolyn Keene – The Secret of Shadow Ranch
- Margaret Kennedy – Return I Dare Not
- Irmgard Keun – Gilgi – eine von uns (Gilgi – One of Us)
- Halldór Laxness – Salka Valka, pt I: Þú vínviður hreini (O Thou Pure Vine)
- E. C. R. Lorac – The Murder on the Burrows
- Marie Belloc Lowndes – Letty Lynton
- Compton Mackenzie
  - Buttercups and Daisies
  - Our Street
- W. Somerset Maugham – Six Stories Written in the First Person Singular
- Pierre Mac Orlan – La Bandera
- Nancy Mitford – Highland Fling
- Thomas Mofolo – Chaka
- E. Phillips Oppenheim – Up the Ladder of Gold
- Ilf and Petrov – The Little Golden Calf (Золотой телёнок, Zolotoy telyonok)
- Andrei Platonov – The Foundation Pit (Котлован, Kotlovan, written)
- Anthony Powell – Afternoon Men
- Ellery Queen – The Dutch Shoe Mystery
- Erich Remarque – The Road Back
- Jean Rhys – After Leaving Mr. Mackenzie
- E. Arnot Robertson – Four Frightened People
- Sax Rohmer - Daughter of Fu Manchu
- Rafael Sabatini – Captain Blood Returns
- Vita Sackville-West – All Passion Spent
- Dorothy Sayers – The Five Red Herrings
- George S. Schuyler – Black No More
- Nevil Shute – Lonely Road
- Georges Simenon – Pietr-le-Letton (book format)
- Upton Sinclair – Roman Holiday
- Eleanor Smith – Flamenco
- Stanislas-André Steeman — The Six Dead Men
- Cecil Street – Tragedy on the Line
- Phoebe Atwood Taylor – The Cape Cod Mystery
- Henry Wade – No Friendly Drop
- Edgar Wallace – The Man at the Carlton
- Nathanael West – The Dream Life of Balso Snell
- Ethel Lina White – Put Out the Light
- Virginia Woolf – The Waves
- P. G. Wodehouse
  - Big Money
  - If I Were You
- Francis Brett Young – Mr. and Mrs. Pennington

=== Children and young people ===
- Jean de Brunhoff – Histoire de Babar, le petit éléphant (translated as The Story of Babar)
- John Buchan – The Blanket of the Dark
- Edgar Rice Burroughs
  - A Fighting Man of Mars
  - Tarzan the Invincible
- Arthur Ransome – Swallowdale
- Ruth Plumly Thompson – Pirates in Oz (25th in the Oz series overall and the 11th written by her)

=== Drama ===
- Clifford Bax – The Venetian
- Charles Bennett – Sensation
- James Bridie – The Anatomist
- Howard Warren Comstock and Allen C. Miller – Doctor X
- Chen Liting – Put Down Your Whip (放下你的鞭子, Fàngxià nǐde biānzi)
- Noël Coward – Post-Mortem (published)
- Federico García Lorca – When Five Years Pass (Así que pasen cinco años, written)
- Benn Levy - Springtime for Henry
- Jean Giraudoux – Judith
- Walter Hackett –
  - The Gay Adventure
  - Good Losers (with Michael Arlen)
  - Take a Chance
- Ian Hay
  - Mr Faint-Heart
  - The Midshipmaid
- Ronald Jeans
  - Can the Leopard...?
  - Lean Harvest
- Edward Knoblock – Grand Hotel
- André Obey
  - Noé (Noah)
  - Le Viol de Lucrèce (The Rape of Lucretia)
- Eugene O'Neill – Mourning Becomes Electra
- Marcel Pagnol – Fanny
- J. B. Priestley and Edward Knoblock – The Good Companions
- Ahmed Shawqi – Qambeez (Cambyses)
- Dodie Smith – Autumn Crocus
- Gladys Bronwyn Stern – The Man Who Pays The Piper
- John Van Druten
  - Hollywood Holiday
  - London Wall
  - Sea Fever
  - There's Always Juliet
- Ödön von Horváth – Tales from the Vienna Woods (Geschichten aus dem Wiener Wald)
- Edgar Wallace – The Old Man
- Thornton Wilder – The Long Christmas Dinner
- Carl Zuckmayer – The Captain of Köpenick (Der Hauptmann von Köpenick)

=== Non-fiction ===
- Samuel Beckett – Proust
- Adrian Bell – Silver Ley
- Marc Bloch – Les Caractères originaux de l'histoire rurale française
- Ali Akbar Dehkhoda et al. – Dehkhoda Dictionary of the Persian language
- Julius Evola – The Hermetic Tradition
- Emma Goldman – Living My Life
- John Middleton Murry – Son of Woman: The Story of D. H. Lawrence
- Irma S. Rombauer – Joy of Cooking
- Edmund Wilson – Axel's Castle

== Births ==
- January 4 – José Triana, Cuban poet (d. 2018)
- January 6
  - E. L. Doctorow, American author (died 2015)
  - P. J. Kavanagh, English poet, novelist, and broadcaster (died 2015)
- January 9 – Algis Budrys, Lithuanian-American science fiction author (died 2008)
- January 10 – Peter Barnes, English playwright (died 2004)
- January 17 – Mark Brandis (Nikolai von Michalewsky), German journalist and science fiction author (died 2000)
- January 20 – Sawako Ariyoshi, Japanese novelist (died 1984)
- January 24 – Leonard Baker, American historian and Pulitzer-winning author (died 1984)
- January 27
  - Allan W. Eckert, American historian and novelist (died 2011)
  - Shirley Hazzard, Australian author (died 2016)
  - John Hopkins, English screenwriter (died 1998)
  - Mordecai Richler, Canadian author (died 2001)
- February 2 – Walter Burkert, German writer (died 2015)
- February 6 – Mamie Van Doren, American actress and writer
- February 9 – Thomas Bernhard, Dutch-born Austrian author (died 1989)
- February 11 – Larry Merchant, American author and boxing commentator
- February 12 – Janwillem van de Wetering, Dutch-American crime writer (died 2008)
- February 18
  - Johnny Hart, American cartoonist (died 2007)
  - Toni Morrison, American writer and Nobel Prize winner (died 2019)
- February 19 – Robert Sobel, American business writer (died 1999)
- February 24 – Barry Oakley, Australian writer.
- March 11
  - Janosch, German children's author and illustrator
  - Rupert Murdoch, Australian-born publisher
- March 16 – Augusto Boal, Brazilian theater director and writer (died 2009)
- March 22 – Leslie Thomas, Welsh novelist (died 2014)
- March 26 – Alison Prince, English-born Scottish children's writer and biographer (died 2019)
- April 1 – Rolf Hochhuth, German dramatist (died 2020)
- April 2 – Joseph Joffo, French author (died 2018)
- April 12 – Chico Anysio, Brazilian actor, comedian, writer and composer (died 2012)
- April 15 – Tomas Tranströmer, Swedish poet and translator (died 2015)
- April 21 – Gabriel de Broglie, French historian
- April 29 – Robert Gottlieb, American editor (died 2023)
- May 2 – Ruth Fainlight, American-born poet, short story writer, translator and librettist
- May 7 – Gene Wolfe, American science fiction and fantasy writer (died 2019)
- May 23 – Barbara Barrie, American actress and writer
- June 12 – Robin Cook (Derek Raymond), English crime novelist (died 1994)
- June 21 – Patricia Goedicke, American poet (died 2006)
- June 26 – Colin Wilson, British novelist and philosopher (died 2013)
- June 28 – Hans Alfredson, Swedish actor and writer and comedian (d. 2017)
- July 4 – Sébastien Japrisot, French novelist and screenwriter (died 2003)
- July 6 – Emily Nasrallah, Lebanese writer and women's rights activist (died 2018)
- July 7 – David Eddings, American novelist (died 2009)
- July 10
  - Nick Adams, American screenwriter (died 1968)
  - Julian May, American science fiction author (died 2017)
  - Alice Munro, Canadian short story writer (died 2024)
- July 14 – E. V. Thompson, English novelist (died 2012)
- July 15 – Clive Cussler, American thriller writer and underwater explorer (died 2020)
- July 17 – Caroline Graham, English playwright, screenwriter and novelist
- August 2 – Karl Miller, British writer and literary editor (died 2014)
- August 12 – William Goldman, American novelist and screenwriter (died 2018)
- August 14 – Frederic Raphael, American-born English screenwriter, novelist and non-fiction author
- August 16 – Marion Patrick Jones, Trinidadian writer (died 2016)
- August 22 – Maurice Gee, New Zealand novelist
- September 14 – Ivan Klíma, Czech novelist and dramatist (died 2025)
- September 15 – Kalim Siddiqui, Pakistani-born British writer and Islamic activist (died 1996)
- September 22
  - Ashokamitran (Jagadisa Thyagarajan), Indian fiction writer (died 2017)
  - Fay Weldon, English novelist (died 2023)
- October 8 – Dennis Silk, American-born English writer on literature and cricket, and first-class cricketer (died 2019)
- October 13 – Janice Elliott, English novelist and children's writer (died 1995)
- October 19 – John le Carré (David John Moore Cornwell), English spy novelist (died 2020)
- October 22 – Ann Rule, American true-crime writer (died 2015)
- October 23 – James McNeish, New Zealand novelist, playwright and biographer (died 2016)
- November 3 – Arun Sarma, Assamese playwright and novelist (died 2017)
- November 15 – Kulanthai Shanmugalingam, Sri Lankan playwright (died 2025)
- November 18 – Nikoloz Janashia, Georgian historian (died 1982)
- November 28
  - Dervla Murphy, Irish cyclist and author (died 2022)
  - Tomi Ungerer, Alsatian illustrator and writer (died 2019)
- December 2 – Nigel Calder, British science writer (died 2014)
- December 15 – Klaus Rifbjerg, Danish writer (died 2015)
- December 17 – Krystyna Boglar, Polish writer known mostly for her work for children and young adults (died 2019)
- December 24 – Walter Abish, Austrian-born American writer (died 2022)
- December 31 – Bob Shaw, Irish science-fiction writer (died 1996)

== Deaths ==
- January 3 – L. Adams Beck, Irish writer (born 1862)
- January 12 – Henry Gauthier-Villars, French writer (born 1859)
- January 26 – Graça Aranha, Brazilian diplomat and writer (born 1868)
- March 25 – Ida B. Wells, American journalist and novelist (born 1862)
- March 27 – Arnold Bennett, English novelist (born 1867)
- April 4 – André Michelin, French originator of Michelin Guides (born 1853)
- April 10 – Khalil Gibran, Lebanese-born American poet (born 1883)
- June 29 – Nérée Beauchemin, French-Canadian poet (born 1850)
- July 2 – Harald Høffding, Danish philosopher (born 1843)
- July 14 – Vasile Cijevschi, Bessarabian Romanian soldier, journalist and short-story writer (born 1880)
- August 1 – Bertha McNamara, German-born Australian pamphleteer and bookseller (born 1853)
- August 15 – Delfín Chamorro, Spanish poet and language teacher (born 1863)
- August 26 – Frank Harris, Irish-born American author and editor (born 1856)
- August 31 – Hall Caine, Manx novelist and dramatist (born 1853)
- September 8 – Sue A. Sanders, American teacher, clubwoman, and author (born 1842)
- September 9 – Matilda Cugler-Poni, Romanian poet (born 1851)
- September 24 – Ethel Hillyer Harris, author (born 1859)
- September 30 – Jane Meade Welch, American historian (born 1854)
- October 13 – Ernst Didring, Swedish novelist (born 1868)
- October 21 – Arthur Schnitzler, Austrian dramatist (born 1862)
- October 27 – Lucas Malet (Mary St Leger Kingsley), English novelist (born 1852)
- November 3 – Juan Zorrilla de San Martín, Uruguayan epic poet (born 1855)
- November 5 – Ole Edvart Rolvaag, Norwegian American writer (born 1876)
- November 19 – Xu Zhimo (徐志摩), Chinese poet (air accident, born 1897)
- December 5 – Vachel Lindsay, American poet (born 1879)
- December 10 – Enrico Corradini, Italian novelist, essayist and journalist (born 1865)
- December 26 – Melvil Dewey, American inventor of library classification system (born 1851)
- December 27 – Alfred Perceval Graves, Irish author and collector of songs and ballads (born 1846)
- December 31 – Ieronim Yasinsky, Russian writer, poet and essayist (born 1850)

== Awards ==
- Chancellor's Gold Medal: Robert Gittings
- James Tait Black Memorial Prize for fiction: Kate O'Brien, Without My Cloak
- James Tait Black Memorial Prize for biography: J. Y. R. Greig, David Hume
- Newbery Medal for children's literature: Elizabeth Coatsworth, The Cat Who Went to Heaven
- Nobel Prize in Literature – Erik Axel Karlfeldt
- Pulitzer Prize for Drama: Susan Glaspell, Alison's House
- Pulitzer Prize for Poetry: Robert Frost, Collected Poems
- Pulitzer Prize for the Novel: Margaret Ayer Barnes, Years of Grace
