= Roman Holiday (disambiguation) =

Roman Holiday is a 1953 film starring Audrey Hepburn and Gregory Peck.

Roman Holiday may also refer to:

== Film, television, and theatre ==
- Roman Holiday (1987 film), an American television film based on the 1953 film
- Roman Holiday (2017 film), a South Korean film directed by Lee Duk-hee
- "Roman Holiday" (Gossip Girl), an episode of Gossip Girl
- The Roman Holidays, a 1972 American animated television series
- Roman Holiday (musical), a musical play based on the 1953 film

== Music ==
=== Performers ===
- Roman Holiday (band), an American alternative-rock band since 2008
- Roman Holliday, a 1980s British swing and pop band

=== Songs ===
- "Roman Holiday" (song), by Nicki Minaj, 2012
- "Roman Holiday", written by Norman Malkin and Margie Rayburn, 1963
- "Roman Holiday", by Halsey from Badlands, 2015
- "Roman Holiday", by The National from I Am Easy to Find, 2019
- "Roman Holiday", by Every Time I Die from New Junk Aesthetic, 2009
- "Roman Holiday", by Fontaines D.C. from Skinty Fia, 2022

== Literature ==
- Roman Holiday (novel), a 1931 novel by Upton Sinclair
- "Roman Holiday", the eleventh issue of the Batman: The Long Halloween limited series
- RWBY: Roman Holiday, a 2021 RWBY novel by E. C. Myers

== Other uses ==
- "Roman holiday", an English expression of Schadenfreude

== See also ==
- Roman festivals, holidays in ancient Rome
