= Sinister Street =

1913-14 novel by Compton Mackenzie

First edition (UK, publ. Martin Secker)

Sinister Street is a 1913–1914 novel by Compton Mackenzie. It is a kind of Bildungsroman, or novel about growing up, and concerns two children, Michael Fane and his sister Stella. Each of them is born out of wedlock, something that was frowned on at the time, but to rich parents.

In the UK, the novel was published in two volumes. However, in the United States, the volumes appeared as two separate books: Youth's Encounter (1913) and Sinister Street (1914).

== Sequels ==
The novel had several sequels, which continue until Michael Fane's marriage:

- 1917 – Guy and Pauline (published in the United States as Plashers Mead)
- 1918 – The Early Life and Adventures of Sylvia Scarlett (made into the 1935 film Sylvia Scarlett, starring Katharine Hepburn and Cary Grant)
- 1919 – Sylvia and Michael

== Adaptations ==
The book was turned into the 1922 silent film Sinister Street, directed by George Beranger. In 1969, it was adapted by the BBC for the TV series Sinister Street.

== Reception ==
George Orwell enjoyed the book illicitly as a prep school boy at St Cyprian's School in Eastbourne, where the headmistress, Mrs "Flip" Wilkes, gave a prize for the best list of books read. Cyril Connolly reported in Enemies of Promise that "although I won the prize through heading my list with Thomas Carlyle's The French Revolution: A History—and Orwell won it next—we were both caught at last with two volumes of Sinister Street and our favour sank to zero." Orwell responded to Connolly with the comment, "There was a fearful row about bringing that kind of book into the school." Orwell's biographer Gordon Bowker suggests:

It was not surprising that Sinister Street should so rivet young Eric. Its hero, Michael Fane, is studying Classics at a prep school, and moves with his mother from the countryside to Kensington (close to where Orwell's Aunt Nellie lived). He spends holidays in Cornwall (as Orwell's family did), visits Bournemouth (where Orwell's Uncle Charlie lived), and meets a girl from an Anglo-Indian family whose father is away in Burma. He visits Eastbourne and thinks what a lovely place. (Hollow laughter from Blair and Connolly, no doubt). Fane envies a wild looking, unkempt boy he sees wandering down Kensington High Street and longs to be "a raggle-taggle wanderer".

Connolly also wrote critically of the book in the first section of Enemies of Promise, stating:

Nineteen fourteen was also the year of an important bad book Sinister Street. It is a work of inflation, important because it is the first of a long line of bad books, the novels of adolescence, autobiographical, romantic, which squandered the vocabulary of love and literary appreciation and played into the hands of the Levellers and Literary Puritans.

Max Beerbohm said of it:

There is no book on Oxford like it. It gives you the actual Oxford experience. What Mackenzie has miraculously done is to make you feel what each term was like.

Frank Swinnerton, a literary critic, described it thus:

It is the picture of the development of a very precocious boy into a sophisticated young man of the nineteen-tens, and the picture is painted with a detail and wealth of reference unattempted by other authors of Mackenzie's experience. It illustrates most of its author's gifts, and all his faults. It is lavish, it contains rodomontade, it is literary, sentimental and florid. But it has no timidities; it is large and confident; it is a picture of something more than a single life. It is a record of a departed generation.

John Betjeman said of it, "This has always seemed to me one of the best novels of the best period in English novel writing." Henry James thought it to be the most remarkable book written by a young author in his lifetime.
