= Sinister Street (TV series) =

- Genre: Drama
- Starring: Jo Kendall; Kate Lansbury; David Collings
- Country of origin: United Kingdom
- Original language: English
- No. of series: 1
- No. of episodes: 6 (all missing)

Production
- Running time: 45 minutes

Original release
- Network: BBC 2
- Release: 10 May – 14 June 1969

Sinister Street is a British television series that originally aired on the BBC in six episodes between 10 May and 14 June 1969. It is based on the 1913 novel of the same title by Compton Mackenzie.

The cast included Jo Kendall, Kate Lansbury, David Collings, Jeanne Moody, Michael Osborne, Valerie Gearon, Joan Hickson, Elaine Taylor, Angela Baddeley, Arthur Hewlett and Jo Rowbottom.

Being the sole televised adaptation produced, all six episodes were wiped and are believed to be lost.

== Bibliography ==
- Philip Waller. Writers, Readers, and Reputations: Literary Life in Britain 1870-1918. Oxford University Press, 2008.
