= Coral (novel) =

1925 novel

- Author: Compton Mackenzie
- Language: English
- Genre: Drama
- Publisher: Cassell
- Publication date: 1925
- Publication place: United Kingdom
- Media type: Print

Coral is a 1925 novel by the British writer Compton Mackenzie. It is a sequel to his 1912 work Carnival.

== Bibliography ==
- David Joseph Dooley. Compton Mackenzie. Twayne Publishers, 1974.
- Andro Linklater. Compton Mackenzie: A Life Hogarth Press, 1992.
