= Faith Compton Mackenzie =

British author

- Faith Compton Mackenzie in 1955
- Born: Faith Nona Stone; 26 February 1878; Eton, Berkshire, England
- Died: 9 July 1960 (aged 82)
- Education: Francis Holland School for Girls
- Occupation: Writer
- Years active: 1930–1960
- Notable work: The Sibyl of the North (Christina of Sweden) (1931); The Cardinal's Niece (Marie Mancini) (1935); As Much as I Dare (1938); More than I should (1940)
- Spouse: Compton Mackenzie (m. 1905)
- Parent(s): Elizabeth Theresa "Lily" Vidal and Edward Daniel Stone
- Relatives: Christopher Stone

Faith Nona, Lady Mackenzie (née Stone; 26 February 1878 – 9 July 1960), known as Faith Compton Mackenzie, was a biographer, short story writer, memoirist, and novelist.

== Early life and education ==
Faith Nona Stone was born in February 1878, the daughter of Elizabeth Theresa "Lily" Vidal (1841-1898, the only daughter of novelist Mary Theresa Vidal and Rev. Francis Furse Vidal) and Edward Daniel Stone, a Greek and Latin schoolmaster at Eton College. She was one of 10 children, including notable younger brother Christopher Stone, and attended the Francis Holland School for Girls in London.

Between 1901 and 1905 she was an actress, under the stage name "Faith Reynolds", in Sir Charles Hawtrey's company, appearing in London and New York, initially in his production of A Message from Mars. In 1903 she appeared with Hawtrey and Arthur Playfair in Hawtrey's production of F. Anstey's play The Man from Blankley's in London, New York, Washington DC, Detroit, and Chicago. During these years she knew the Irish artist Althea Gyles, on whom the character of Ariadne Burden in Tatting (1957) was later based.

On 30 November 1905, Faith Stone married the writer Compton Mackenzie in St Saviour's, Pimlico.

== Career and later life ==
Between 1913 and 1920, Mackenzie lived with her husband on Capri at Villa Solitaria, an Italian island near Sorrento. Mackenzie was known for her talent as a pianist, and during her time on Capri she had a number of affairs, including one with the Italian pianist Renata Borgatti.

When Compton Mackenzie returned to Capri in 1917 on sick leave from his military service, he discovered that Faith was having an affair with a much younger man, who died shortly afterwards from pneumonia. He helped her through the mourning period, but determined that henceforth they would live as companions, and for the rest of their lives, the couple lived apart for much of the time. From 1920, Compton Mackenzie was a tenant of the Channel Islands of Herm and Jethou. During this time D. H. Lawrence dined with Faith in Capri. She was the inspiration behind the story 'Two Blue Birds', and was unhappy that he had written such a "monstrous perversion of facts" based on their dinner conversation.

From 1930, the Mackenzies lived on the Scottish island Eilean Aigas, and it is from this period onwards that she began to write. She began with historical biographies in the early 1930s.

In 1933, the Mackenzies relocated to Barra, where they built a house named 'Suidheachan' (the sitting-down place). She reportedly had a "passion for furnishing new houses" that fortunately matched her husband's passion for acquiring new islands. By the late 1930s Faith Mackenzie became best known for volumes of memoirs describing her life in places such as Capri, Paris, Rome, Milan, Guernsey and Barra.

During the Second World War, Mackenzie lived in Peace Cottage, Kingweston, in Somerset, until the lease ran out and she was forced to return to London. After the war, she travelled often to Italy and to the Balearic islands. By the mid 1940s, the Mackenzies were no longer living on islands and had bought Denchworth Manor near Wantage. In 1950, Lady Mackenzie bought a stuffed tabby cat at Portobello Market that was purported to be Crimean Tom, the famous survivor of the war in Sebastopol. It is now in the National Army Museum. The National Portrait Gallery holds a portrait of Lady Mackenzie from November 1955. Faith Compton Mackenzie published her last memoir in 1943, and her last biographies in 1943 and 1950. Her two novels were published in 1954 and 1957. Her mental health deteriorated in her extreme old age, and she died on 9 July 1960.

Compton Mackenzie married his long-time secretary Christina MacSween in 1961, and, after the second Lady Mackenzie's death in 1963, he married her younger sister, Lily in 1965.

Faith Compton Mackenzie's works have largely remained out of print, but in 2024 her first story collection, Mandolinata, and her last novel Tatting were republished in a single volume.
