= The Ballet Girl =

The Ballet Girl may refer to:

- The Ballet Girl, another name for the operetta The Peasant Girl
- The Ballet Girl (1918 film), a German silent comedy film
- The Ballet Girl (1916 film), an American silent drama film
