= Edward Daniel Stone =

Edward Daniel Stone (1832 – 17 September 1916) was an ordained deacon, classical scholar and a schoolmaster at Eton College.

== Early life ==
He was the son of Lucia Catherine Stone (née Boswell) and Joseph Stone. His siblings were Walter George Boswell Stone, an antiquarian; William Harry Stone, and Edith Stone.

He attended Eton College beginning in 1845 and in 1856 he received a BA from King's College, Cambridge. Three years later he received his master's degree at Cambridge. From 1855 until 1862, he was a Fellow of King's. In 1860, he was ordained a deacon of the Church of England.

== Career ==
=== Educator ===
Beginning in 1857, he was assistant master at Eton, a position he held for about 27 years. His students included Sir Henry Babington Smith and Sir Evelyn Ruggles-Brise. On 20 November 1873 he was admitted into the Chemical Society.

Reilly stated that in 1884, he established a school in Broadstairs, Kent in Stone House and operated the school until 1895. (Note: Stone House was built for by Sir Charles Raymond, a wealthy East India Merchant.) Stone moved to Abingdon, Berkshire after retirement in 1898, living with his son Rev. Francis Joseph (Frank) Stone, who was the Science Master at Radley College.

=== Author ===
He was the author of The Field of Rivalry: An Heroic Poem, in four books, written in the 1850s. Stone published Dorica, a volume of poems, four of which were in Dorset dialect. The volume was inspired by poet William Barnes. In 1912, Stone published Herbert Kynaston: A Short Memoir with Selections from His Occasional Writings a memoir of Herbert Kynaston (1835 - 1910), principal of Cheltenham College, canon of Durham Cathedral and professor of Greek at Durham University.

== Personal life ==
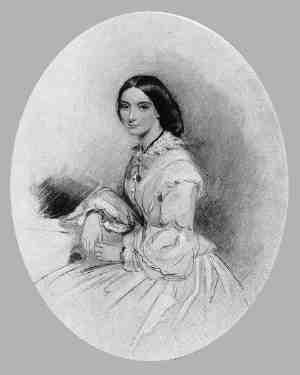
Elizabeth Theresa Vidal (1841-1898)

In August 1861, Stone married Elizabeth Theresa "Lily" Vidal (the only daughter of novelist Mary Theresa Vidal and Rev. Francis Furse Vidal). Their ten children included Lucy, Frank, Ned, Ruth, Mary, Margaret, William Johnson, Guy, Faith, and Christopher. They adopted Nelly Stone.

During his life, Stone corresponded with his son-in-law Compton Mackenzie.

Stone died on 17 September 1916 in Abingdon and is buried in Radley at St. James's Churchyard.

== Works ==
He was a Greek and Latin scholar. Among others he published:

- The Hannibalian Or Second Punic War, 1881
- Ionides: Exercises in Greek Iambics, 1883
- Dorica; (A Book of his Poetry) Kegan Paul, Trench & Co, 1888
- Selection from the Greek tragedians, 1890
- Tu Es Petrus. An Examination of Two Passages in S. Matthew's Gospel, and of the Doctrine of the Real Presence, 1909
- Florilegium Latinum; Translations Into Latin Verse, with Francis St John Thackeray, 1923
