= Ben Nevis Goes East =

1954 novel

- First edition
- Author: Compton Mackenzie
- Language: English
- Genre: Comedy
- Publisher: Chatto and Windus
- Publication date: 1954
- Publication place: United Kingdom
- Media type: Print

Ben Nevis Goes East is a 1954 comedy novel by the British writer Compton Mackenzie. It features characters introduced in Mackenzie's The Monarch of the Glen. Donald MacDonald of Ben Nevis and his friend Kilwhillie head to British India in order to save his nephew from what is considered a disastrous marriage to a divorced woman.

== Bibliography ==
- David Joseph Dooley. Compton Mackenzie. Twayne Publishers, 1974.
