= Novel Nature =

- Origin: Seattle, Washington, United States
- Genres: Alternative rock, Pop rock
- Labels: Unsigned
- Members: Shane Lance; Emerson Shotwell

Novel Nature is an alternative rock band from Seattle, Washington, United States. The band comprises songwriters/producers Shane Lance (lead vocals, guitars, keyboards) and Emerson Shotwell (drums, percussion).

== Formation ==
Shane Lance and Emerson Shotwell first met during elementary school. They began playing in bands throughout their junior high and high school days. After the disbandment of rock band Roman Holiday, Shotwell and Lance decided to start the new two-piece band.

The group released Nylon Nation in 2014, and followed with a standalone single, "Gunfight", in 2017. The full-length Irregular Heartbeats was released in 2021.

== Discography ==
Albums

- Nylon Nation (2014)
- Irregular Heartbeats (2021)

Singles

- "Gunfight" (2017)

== Members ==
- Shane Lance – lead vocals, guitars, keys (2013–present)
- Emerson Shotwell – drums, percussion (2013–present)
