= Eilean Aigas =

Island in the River Beauly, Scotland

Eilean Àigeis (Gaelic)

Location
- Eilean Aigas shown within Highland Scotland
- OS grid reference: NH467417
- Coordinates: 57.43976°N 4.55505°W

Name
- Gaelic pronunciation: [elan ˈaːkʲəʃ]

Physical geography
- Highest elevation: 103 m (338 ft)

Administration
- Council area: Highland
- Country: Scotland
- Sovereign state: United Kingdom

Demographics
- Population: No estimate available

Eilean Aigas (NH4641) (Scottish Gaelic: Eilean Àigeis) is an island in the River Beauly, Scotland, in Kiltarlity parish in traditional Inverness-shire, now Highland Region. It is most notable for the mansion on it at its north end, which was formerly owned by the Sobieski Stuarts and rented by author and Scottish nationalist Compton Mackenzie from Lord Fraser of Lovat. It is joined to the bank by a narrow white bridge.

The Eilean Aigas estate was owned by the Lovat Frasers until 1995, when it was bought by King Chong Chai, a Malaysian businessman, for around £600,000. Chai put the island up for sale in 2001, for an asking price of £3 million. It was purchased by Brendan Clouston, a Canadian businessman, who was formerly president of Tele-Communications Inc. The house was built in 2006, it is a replica of a 19th-century hunting lodge. In 2013 the estate was once again for sale, for offers over £15 million. It sold in 2015 for £3 million. LDN Architect is a company that also made construction changes to the Elien Aigas Estate as a private client of the private property for the entrance and office in 2006.

== Sobieski Stuarts ==
John Sobieski Stuart and Charles Edward Stuart were names used by John Carter Allen and Charles Manning Allen, two 19th-century English brothers who are best known for their role in Scottish cultural history. The Sobieski Stuarts were frauds, who claimed to descendants of Charles Edward Stuart. As authors of a dubious book on Scottish tartans and clan dress, the Vestiarium Scoticum, they are the source of some current tartan traditions.

In the 1830s they moved to Eilean Aigas into a hunting lodge granted them by the Earl of Lovat. Here they "held court" and surrounded themselves with royal paraphernalia: pennants, seals, even thrones. During their time here, they adopted the final version of their names, using the surname 'Stuart', and became practising Roman Catholics.

Much of the furniture in the house was designed by the Sobieski Stuarts.

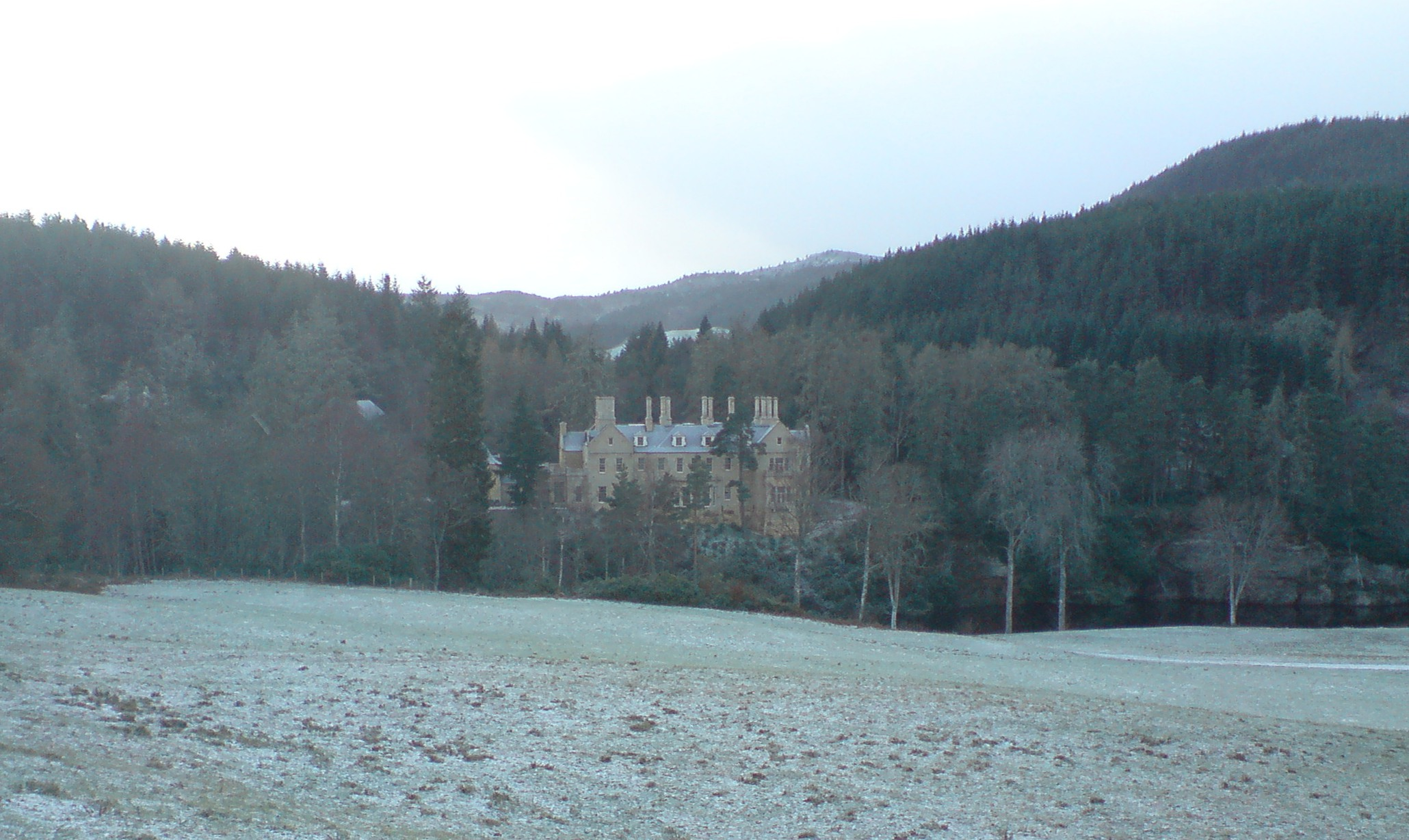
Eilean Aigas House

== Compton and Faith Mackenzie ==
The MacKenzies rented Eilean Aigas for £450 per annum from December 1930. As Faith Compton Mackenzie recalled:

"On the north side rugged purple and grey cliffs flanked the narrow, turbulent river, small pine trees hung at all angles over the water from rock crevices. Walking against the stream up on the grassy path of the cliff, you suddenly went downhill and came upon the same river tranquil as a pool."

They had to keep the place heated for seven out of twelve months of the year and the ceiling of one of the rooms once collapsed on Compton while he was asleep. However, Faith also recollected that the garden was particularly beautiful:

"Free for nearly three years from all restraint, climbing roses had scaled the heights... the ground was a carpet of tulips: Iris germanica in every possible variety... The acacias in the sunk garden, now big trees, filled the air with their scent... Dear God! This was a garden in a dream."

They left in May 1933, in violation of the lease. Compton MacKenzie was of Jacobite sympathies and, like the Sobieski Stuarts, a Roman Catholic convert.
