= The Stolen Soprano =

1965 novel

- First edition
- Author: Compton Mackenzie
- Language: English
- Genre: Comedy
- Publisher: Chatto and Windus
- Publication date: 1965
- Publication place: United Kingdom
- Media type: Print

The Stolen Soprano is a 1965 comedy novel by the British writer Compton Mackenzie. It was his penultimate novel, followed by Paper Lives in 1966.

== Bibliography ==
- David Joseph Dooley. Compton Mackenzie. Twayne Publishers, 1974.
