= Poor Relations (novel) =

1919 novel by Compton Mackenzie

- Author: Compton Mackenzie
- Language: English
- Genre: Comedy
- Publication date: 1919
- Publication place: United Kingdom
- Media type: Print
- Followed by: April Fools

Poor Relations is a 1919 comedy novel by the British writer Compton Mackenzie. In contrast to his grimmer Sylvia and Michael, published the same year, the story was a light-hearted comedy about the ups-and-downs of a playwright.

It was followed by a sequel April Fools in 1930.
