= Monarch of the Glen =

Monarch of the Glen or The Monarch of the Glen may refer to:

- The Monarch of the Glen (painting), a painting by Sir Edwin Landseer
- Monarch of the Glen (TV series), a British television drama based in the Highlands
- The Monarch of the Glen (novel), a 1941 novel by Compton Mackenzie
- The Monarch of the Glen (novella), a novella by Neil Gaiman in his 2006 anthology Fragile Things
