= Hunting the Fairies =

1949 novel

- First edition
- Author: Compton Mackenzie
- Language: English
- Genre: Comedy
- Publisher: Chatto & Windus
- Publication date: 1949
- Publication place: United Kingdom
- Media type: Print

Hunting the Fairies is a 1949 comedy novel by the British writer Compton Mackenzie. It features some of the characters who had previously appeared in The Monarch of the Glen.

== Bibliography ==
- David Joseph Dooley. Compton Mackenzie. Twayne Publishers, 1974.
