= The Rival Monster =

1952 novel by Compton Mackenzie

- First edition cover
- Author: Compton Mackenzie
- Language: English
- Genre: Comedy
- Publisher: Chatto & Windus
- Publication date: 1952
- Publication place: United Kingdom
- Media type: Print

The Rival Monster is a 1952 comedy novel by the British writer Compton Mackenzie. It includes characters from two earlier hit novels by Mackenzie Whisky Galore and The Monarch of the Glen.

After the Loch Ness Monster is apparently killed in a collision with a flying saucer, a new monster is spotted at the remote island of Little Todday in the Outer Hebrides, leading to tourists to flock to the area.

== Bibliography ==
- David Joseph Dooley. Compton Mackenzie. Twayne Publishers, 1974.
