= Carnival (1946 film) =

1946 film

- Directed by: Stanley Haynes
- Screenplay by: Peter Ustinov; Eric Maschwitz
- Based on: Carnival by Compton Mackenzie
- Produced by: John Sutro; Wilfred Sassoon
- Starring: Sally Gray; Michael Wilding; Stanley Holloway
- Cinematography: Guy Green
- Edited by: Ralph Kemplen
- Music by: Nicholas Brodzsky; Charles Williams
- Production company: Two Cities Films
- Distributed by: General Film Distributors
- Release date: 2 December 1946
- Running time: 93 minutes
- Country: United Kingdom
- Language: English

Carnival is a 1946 British drama film directed by Stanley Haynes and starring Sally Gray, Michael Wilding, Stanley Holloway and Jean Kent. It was written by Peter Ustinov and Eric Maschwitz based on the 1912 novel of the same name by Compton Mackenzie, which had previous been made into a 1932 film Dance Pretty Lady by Anthony Asquith. It was shot at Denham Studios with sets designed by the art director Carmen Dillon.

The film is about a ballet dancer of the Edwardian era. The title is not explained as there is no carnival in the story.

== Plot ==
Jenny is born. Her father is out at the theatre, watching a clown show – the clown is also his lodger. Three elderly women stand by the bed and lecture Mrs Raeburn on the follies of her daughter joining the stage.

Later, Jenny is on stage as a ballerina, her father proudly and loudly pointing her out from the balcony, not that the audience wish to hear.

Jenny takes the name of Pearl. She is attractive and easily draws the attention of men. At an art gallery one day, she tries to demonstrate how a sculpture of a dancer is not physically possible and falls over in the process. She is caught by the artist Maurice Avery and they begin a love affair. He asks her to live with him – but not to marry.

At home she still lives with her hard-working mother and fun-loving (and often drunk) father. A new lodger moves into the house, Mr Trewhella. He is told of the ballet and goes to see Jenny on stage. Maurice is already disturbing her career and making her miss rehearsals. Now he plans to take her to Europe on an artistic tour - but he has not told her. Trewhella spies on Jenny and Maurice as they chat after the show. At home he tells Jenny he disapproves of the male audience leering at her. He is a country person and does not like town ways.

On her birthday Maurice takes Jenny dancing to the Covent Garden Ball and gives her a bracelet. He tells her he is going to Spain and asks her to join him. She stays out all night and in the morning changes her mind and tells her parents that she is leaving. But when she goes to Maurice's studio he has already gone. Their mutual friend Fuzz explains and asks her to marry him instead and she runs off.

Her colleagues have little sympathy for her loss. When her mother dies unexpectedly Trewhella asks to marry her and look after both Jenny and Maisie in Cornwall. Reluctantly she accepts and is then known as Mistress Trewhella.

Maurice reappears, and they have a tryst. She asks him to take her to Spain and faints. He carries her off.

== Cast ==
- Sally Gray as Jenny Pearl
- Michael Wilding as Maurice Avery
- Stanley Holloway as Charlie Raeburn, Jenny's dad
- Bernard Miles as Trewhella
- Jean Kent as Irene Dale
- Catherine Lacey as Florrie Raeburn, Jenny's mum
- Nancy Price as Trewhella's mother
- Hazel Court as Maisie (May) Raeburn, Jenny's sister
- Michael Clarke as Frank (Fuzz) Castleton
- Brenda Bruce as Maudie Chapman
- Anthony Holles as Corentin
- Ronald Ward as Jack Danby
- Mackenzie Ward as Arthur Danby
- Dennis Arundell as Studholme
- Phyllis Monkman as barmaid
- Amy Feness as Aunt Fanny
- Marie Ault as Mrs. Dale
- Virginia Keiley as Elsie Crawford
- Kathleen Harrison as the Trewhella's maid (uncredited)

== Reception ==
The Monthly Film Bulletin wrote: "The smoothness which Compton Mackenzie gave to his novel is lost here and the quick change from theatrical London to Cornwall slices the film through, despite some good reconstructions of backstreet London and some fine shots of rugged coasts. Chief virtues of the film are fine characterisations by Miles and by Catherine Lacy as Jenny's embittered mother."

Kine Weekly wrote: "Heavy, old-fashioned, gaslight melodrama, very freely adapted from Compton Mackenzie's famous novel."

Variety called it "a disjointed, dispirited picture. None of the principal characters, with the possible exception of roles done by Stanley Holloway and Michael Clarke appears credible."
