= Thin Ice (novel) =

1956 novel

- First edition
- Author: Compton Mackenzie
- Language: English
- Genre: Drama
- Publisher: Chatto & Windus
- Publication date: 1956
- Publication place: United Kingdom
- Media type: Print

Thin Ice is a 1956 novel by the British writer Compton Mackenzie. It tells the career of a homosexual politician seen through the eyes of his lifelong, heterosexual friend.

== Bibliography ==
- David Joseph Dooley. Compton Mackenzie. Twayne Publishers, 1974.
