= Brendan Clouston =

Canadian billionaire and CEO

- Born: Brendan Roy Clouston; 1953 (age 72–73); Montreal, Quebec, Canada
- Education: University of Toronto; Ivey Business School
- Occupation: Businessman
- Known for: Former CEO and president, Tele-Communications Inc.
- Title: The Baron of Dunure
- Spouse: Judy
- Parent: Ross Neal Clouston

Brendan Roy Clouston (born 1953) is a Canadian billionaire, former CEO and president of the telecoms company, Tele-Communications Inc.

== Early life ==
Clouston was born in Montreal, Quebec in 1953, the son of Ross Neal Clouston (1922–2008) and Brenda Clouston. His father cofounded, with his brother, George, LaSalle Frozen Foods and BlueWater Seafoods. The company was acquired by Gorton's of Gloucester, of which he later became president.

He received a bachelor's degree in philosophy from the University of Toronto in 1975, followed by an MBA from the Ivey Business School in London, Ontario in 1979.

== Career ==
Clouston started his career as a management consultant in Toronto, before joining the Bank of Boston. He joined TCI in 1983 as director of finance, and in 1991 he became COO, reporting directly to John Malone. Clouston was CEO and president from 1994. Clouston retired from TCI in 1998, before it was purchased by AT&T the following year.

== Personal life ==
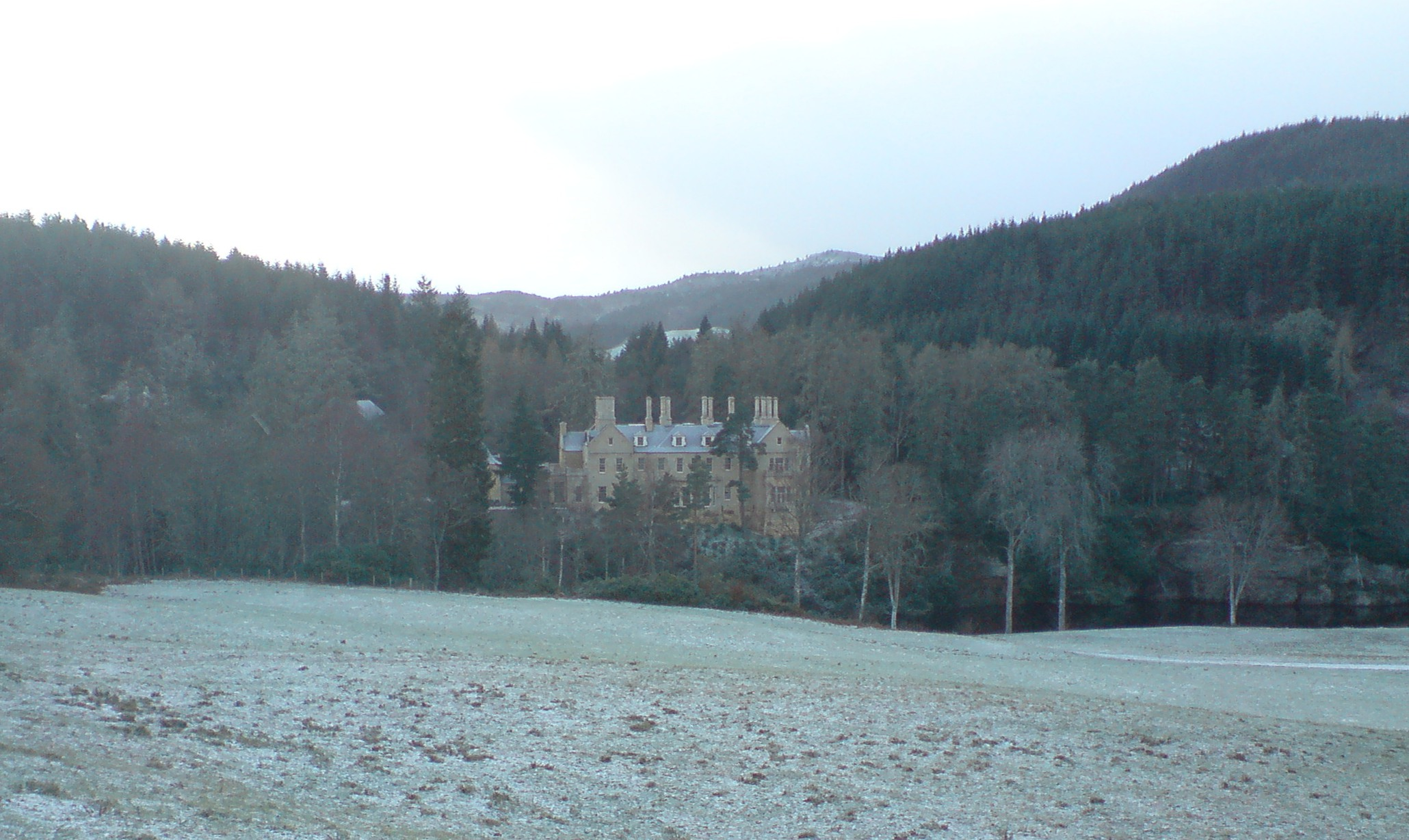
Eilean Aigas House

They lived at Chedington Court, Chedington, Dorset, England, having bought the former hotel in 1997 for £1.2 million. Clouston also purchased two coach houses and the former vicarage of the village in an attempt to recreate the original estate. Clouston also bought himself the title of Baron of Dunure, which was printed on his letterhead in 1998.

In 2003, he bought the 546 acres (221 ha) Eilean Aigas island estate in Scotland, and put it up for sale in 2012 with an asking price of £15 million. It sold in 2015 for £3 million. He now lives in the Channel Islands.

Baronage of Scotland
Preceded by Unknown	Baron of Dunure; 1997-present?	Succeeded by Incumbent
