= Water on the Brain =

1933 novel

- 1954 (publ. Chatto & Windus)
- Author: Compton Mackenzie
- Language: English
- Genre: Comedy thriller
- Publisher: Cassell
- Publication date: 1933
- Publication place: United Kingdom
- Media type: Print

Water on the Brain is a 1933 comedy spy novel by the British writer Compton Mackenzie. Based on his own experiences working for British intelligence during the First World War, Mackenzie wrote a parody of the traditional spy novel. He had recently been prosecuted under the Official Secrets Act for divulging his wartime experience.

== Plot ==
Drawing on his experience in the British secret services, the novel satirizes the shortcomings of the same agency. The novel revolves around the assignments of the main character British secret agent Major Arthur Blenkinsop. According to Fantastic Fiction "The plot involves His Majesty's Director of Extraordinary Intelligence - M.Q.99(E) - sending British agent Major Arthur Blenkinsop to counter the interference of the wily Burgundians and Venetians in the affairs of Mendacia. Blenkinsop also has to deal with the dangerous American agent Katzenschlosser and the charms of the alluring Senora Miranda." Mackenzie was triggered by the reception of his Greek Memories (1932) which had resulted in his prosecution for quoting from secret documents.

== Bibliography ==
- Burton, Alan. Historical Dictionary of British Spy Fiction. Rowman & Littlefield, 2016.
