= Vestal Fire =

1927 novel

- First edition (US)
- Author: Compton Mackenzie
- Language: English
- Genre: Comedy
- Publisher: Cassell (UK); George H. Doran (US)
- Publication date: 1927
- Publication place: United Kingdom
- Media type: Print

Vestal Fire is a 1927 comedy novel by the British writer Compton Mackenzie. It was inspired by the time Mackenzie had spent living in Capri before and after the First World War. The plot is based on loose collection of anectodes about a massive cast of characters, centering on Count Marsac and Virginia and Maimie Pepworth-Northon. The book covers a period from 1902 to 1924.

== Characters ==
Identities based primarily on research conduced by James Money for his book Capri: Island of Pleasure.

- Virginia and Maimie Pepworth-Norton: Old American spinsters. Loose relatives. Based on Sarah "Saidee" Morrison Wolcott-Perry and Kate Wolcott Perry
- Count Marsac: Rich French Count, based on Jacques d'Adelswärd-Fersen
- Carlo: Marsac's secretary, based on Nino Cesarini
- Herbert Bookham: English churchwarden, based on Harold Trower
- Cyril Acott: New Anglican chaplain, based on Rev. Francis Burra
- Joseph Neave: Translator of Dante into American[sic], based on William Page Andrews
- Archibald (Archie) Macadam: Scottish alcoholic, but well liked member of the community. Based on Alexander (Sandie) Grahame.
- Effie Macadam: His wife, based on Sophie Grahame.
- Nigel Dawson: Effeminate young American, based on Vernon Andrews
- Christopher Goldfinch: American painter, based on Charles Caryl Coleman
- Anthony Burlingham: Old English officer, based on Godfrey Thornton
- Mrs. Ambrogio: English expatriate, married to a local lawyer, based on Gwen Galata
- Peter Ambrogio: Local lawyer, based on Giovanni Galata
- John Scudamore: American scholar. Tiberius apologist John Ellingham Brooks?
- Simon Pears: American poet, old friend of Christopher
- Angela Pears: Simons granddaughter
- Anthony Burlingham: American Painter, based on Godfrey Henry Thornton
- Duncan Maxwell: Scottish naturalist, based on Norman Douglas
- Hector Macdonnell: Scottish widow, based on Emilie Fraser, widow of William Langland Fraser
- Alberto and Enrico Jones: Brothers, sons of English expatriate. Based on Edwin and Giorgio Cerio
- Luigi Zampone: Local businessman

One notable exception of characters is Axel Munthe, who was a friend and doctor to both Compton Mackenzie and his wife. Faith made Compton ‘promise not to include that great personality. She feared I might present him to the world as a comic figure.’

== Publication history and reception ==
Novel was published in autumn of 1927. It received a mixed reception in England, and was banned from Italy for several reasons. Amongst them: making fun of carabineri and injuring the fame of Capri. Amongst locals, Gwen Galata was delighted to be present in it, while Edwin and Giorgio Cerio were reported to be furious with it.

== Bibliography ==
- John Champagne. "Are Italians brown? Categorical Miscegenation and Early Twentieth Century Italian Homosexuality." Giornale di Storia, 38, 2022. ISBN/ISSN: 2036-4938.
- David Joseph Dooley. Compton Mackenzie. Twayne Publishers, 1974.
- Andro Linklater. Compton Mackenzie: A Life Hogarth Press, 1992.
