= The Three Couriers =

1929 novel

- First edition (US)
- Author: Compton Mackenzie
- Language: English
- Genre: Comedy thriller
- Publisher: Cassell (UK); Doubleday, Doran
- Publication date: 1929
- Publication place: United Kingdom
- Media type: Print
- Preceded by: Extremes Meet

The Three Couriers is a 1929 comedy thriller novel by the British writer Compton Mackenzie. It was inspired by his experiences working for British intelligence during the First World War. It is set in Southeastern Europe, and features the fictional British spy Roger Waterson who had previously appeared in Extremes Meet. Thriller writer Eric Ambler was an admirer of the novel.

== Bibliography ==
- Burton, Alan. Historical Dictionary of British Spy Fiction. Rowman & Littlefield, 2016.
