= Mezzotint (novel) =

1961 novel

- Author: Compton Mackenzie
- Language: English
- Genre: Comedy
- Publisher: Chatto and Windus
- Publication date: 1961
- Publication place: United Kingdom
- Media type: Print

Mezzotint is a 1961 comedy novel by the British writer Compton Mackenzie.

== Bibliography ==
- David Joseph Dooley. Compton Mackenzie. Twayne Publishers, 1974.
