= The Vanity Girl =

1920 novel

- Author: Compton Mackenzie
- Language: English
- Genre: Drama
- Publisher: Cassell
- Publication date: 1920
- Publication place: United Kingdom
- Media type: Print

The Vanity Girl is a 1920 novel by the British writer Compton Mackenzie.

== Bibliography ==
- David Joseph Dooley. Compton Mackenzie. Twayne Publishers, 1974.
