= Rich Relatives =

1921 novel

- Author: Compton Mackenzie
- Language: English
- Genre: Comedy
- Publisher: Martin Secker
- Publication date: 1921
- Publication place: United Kingdom
- Media type: Print

Rich Relatives is a 1921 comedy novel by the British writer Compton Mackenzie.

== Bibliography ==
- David Joseph Dooley. Compton Mackenzie. Twayne Publishers, 1974.
- Andro Linklater. Compton Mackenzie: A Life Hogarth Press, 1992.
