= Renata Borgatti =

Italian musician (1894–1964)

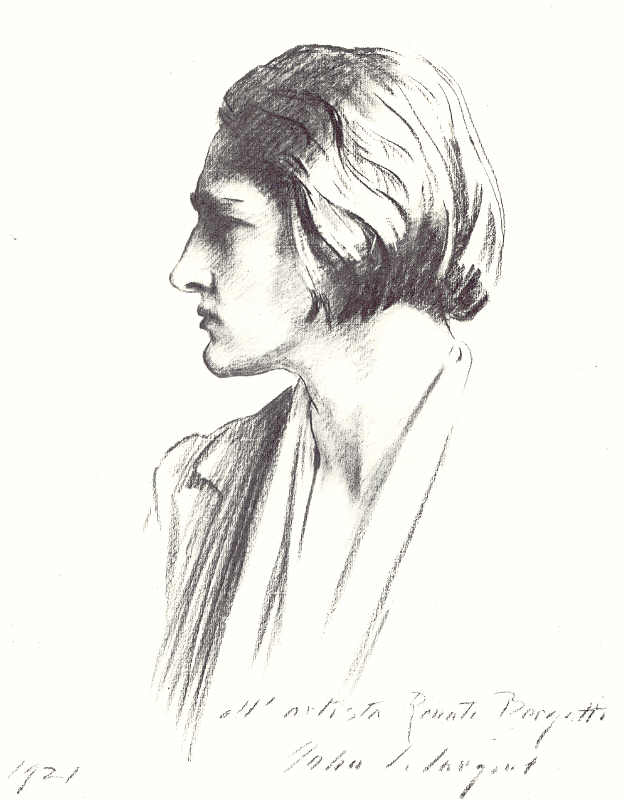
Renata Borgatti, drawn in 1921 by John Singer Sargent.

Renata Borgatti (March 2, 1894 – March 8, 1964) was an Italian classical musician who performed in Europe and the United States.

== Early life ==
She was a daughter of the great Wagnerian tenor Giuseppe Borgatti (1871–1950), whose imposing career at Milan's La Scala opera house was ended by blindness. Trained initially as a ballerina, she abandoned dance to become a concert pianist, specialising in the works of Claude Debussy.

== Relationships ==
A lesbian, she settled on the Mediterranean island of Capri in the early 1900s, where her lifestyle raised fewer eyebrows than elsewhere in Europe. In 1918, she entered into a lesbian affair with an Italian socialite (and baroness) Mimì Franchetti. The duo remained together for just over a year, until Borgatti left Capri and was linked with the prominent American artist Romaine Brooks.

Borgatti had an affair with Faith Compton Mackenzie, whose husband Compton Mackenzie wrote Extraordinary Women in 1928, a satirical roman à clef about a group of lesbians arriving on the island of Sirene, a fictional version of Capri.

In 1920, Borgatti left Capri to pursue her career on the European mainland. She also began a romantic liaison with Brooks, who was by that time pursuing a relationship with the American writer Natalie Barney. Borgatti's affair with Brooks proceeded on and off for at least three years, but was curtailed when Brooks began avoiding her. During the early-1920s, she became intimately involved with Winnaretta Singer, heiress to the Singer sewing machine fortune.

== Career ==
She performed on stage with the violinist Olga Rudge during this period. They worked frequently together, despite the presence of Rudge's lover, the famous poet Ezra Pound, who was then working as a music critic. Pound was not impressed by Borgatti's playing, describing it as "plonking". Like many musicians of the day, she disliked Pound, mostly due to the inconsistency in his assessments. Irrespective of Pound's disregard for Borgatti's musical talents, and her disregard for him, she and Rudge continued to play together for several years: it is likely that they simply shared the same musical tastes.

Later on Borgatti taught music and then died of leukemia in Rome in 1964.
