= Rogues and Vagabonds =

Novel by Commpton Mackenzie

- Author: Compton Mackenzie
- Language: English
- Genre: Historical
- Publisher: Cassell (UK); George H. Doran Co. (US)
- Publication date: 1927
- Publication place: United Kingdom
- Media type: Print

Rogues and Vagabonds is a 1927 historical novel by the British writer Compton Mackenzie. It is set in the Victorian era.

== Bibliography ==
- David Joseph Dooley. Compton Mackenzie. Twayne Publishers, 1974.
- Andro Linklater. Compton Mackenzie: A Life Hogarth Press, 1992.
