= Sylvia Scarlett (novel) =

1918 novel

- Author: Compton Mackenzie
- Language: English
- Genre: Drama
- Publication date: 1918
- Publication place: United Kingdom
- Media type: Print

The Early Life and Adventures of Sylvia Scarlett, often shortened to Sylvia Scarlett, is a 1918 novel by the British writer Compton Mackenzie. The heroine of the story had previously appeared in Mackenzie's Sinister Street. It was followed by a sequel Sylvia and Michael in 1919.

== Adaptation ==
In 1935 it was made into an American film Sylvia Scarlett directed by George Cukor and starring Katharine Hepburn, Cary Grant, Edmund Gwenn and Brian Aherne.

== Bibliography ==
- Goble, Alan. The Complete Index to Literary Sources in Film. Walter de Gruyter, 1999.
- Orel, Harold. Popular Fiction in England, 1914-1918. University Press of Kentucky, 1992.
