= April Fools (novel) =

1930 novel

- First edition (US)
- Author: Compton Mackenzie
- Cover artist: Vladimir Bobri (US cover)
- Language: English
- Genre: Comedy
- Publisher: Cassell (UK); Doubleday, Doran (US)
- Publication date: 1930
- Publication place: United Kingdom
- Media type: Print

April Fools is a 1930 comedy novel by the British writer Compton Mackenzie. It is the sequel to his 1919 work Poor Relations.

== Bibliography ==
- David Joseph Dooley. Compton Mackenzie. Twayne Publishers, 1974.
- Andro Linklater. Compton Mackenzie: A Life Hogarth Press, 1992.
