= Sylvia Scarlett =

1935 film by George Cukor

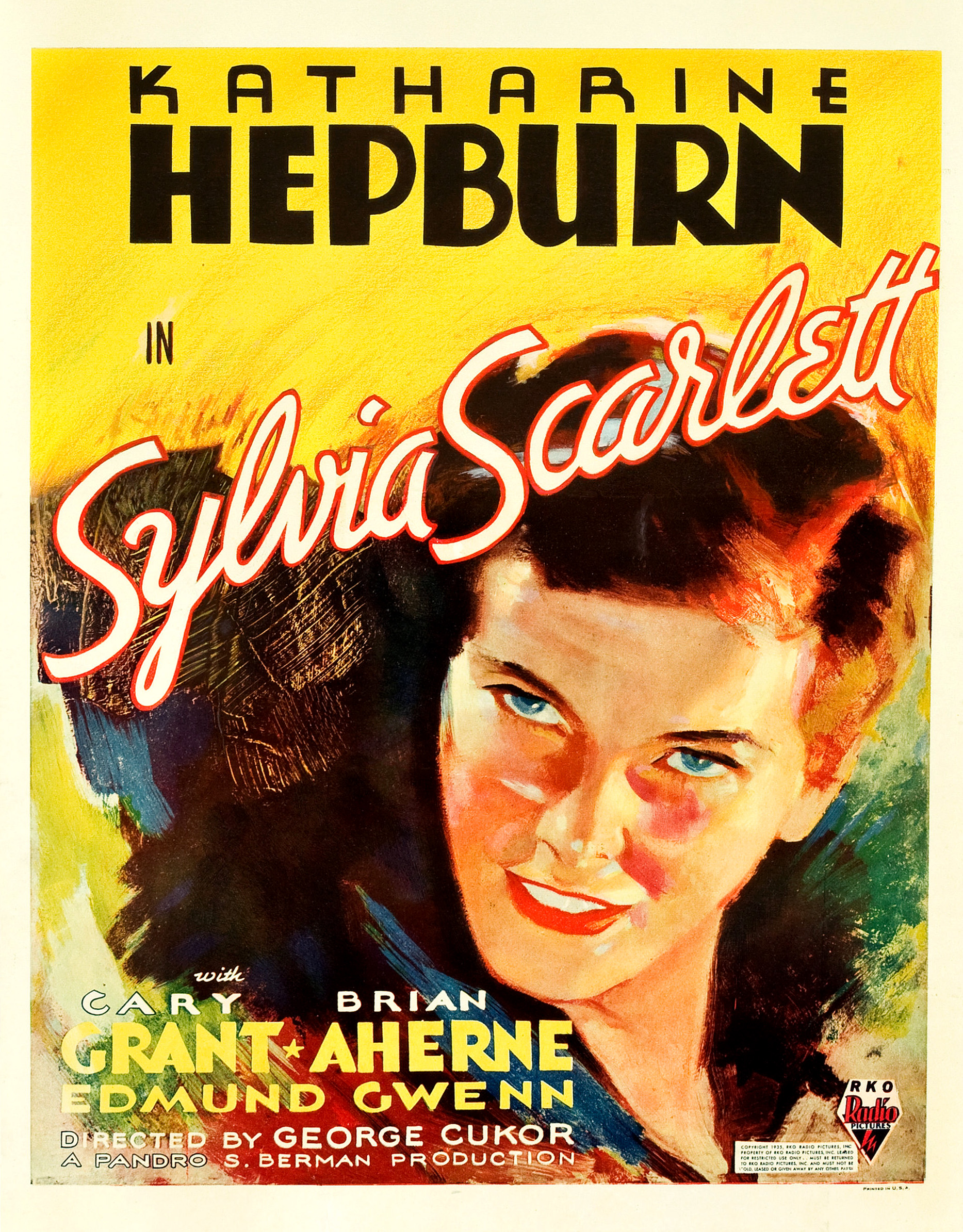
- Theatrical release poster
- Directed by: George Cukor
- Screenplay by: Gladys Unger; John Collier; Mortimer Offner
- Based on: The Early Life and Adventures of Sylvia Scarlett; 1918 novel by Compton MacKenzie
- Produced by: Pandro S. Berman
- Starring: Katharine Hepburn; Cary Grant; Brian Aherne; Edmund Gwenn
- Cinematography: Joseph H. August
- Edited by: Jane Loring
- Music by: Roy Webb
- Distributed by: RKO Radio Pictures
- Release date: December 25, 1935
- Running time: 90 minutes
- Country: United States
- Language: English
- Budget: $641,000
- Box office: $497,000

Sylvia Scarlett is a 1935 American romantic comedy film starring Katharine Hepburn and Cary Grant, based on The Early Life and Adventures of Sylvia Scarlett, a 1918 novel by Compton MacKenzie. Directed by George Cukor, it was notorious as one of the most famous unsuccessful movies of the 1930s. Hepburn plays the title role of Sylvia Scarlett, a female con artist masquerading as a boy to escape the police. The success of the subterfuge is in large part due to the transformation of Hepburn by RKO makeup artist Mel Berns.

This film was the first pairing of Grant and Hepburn, who later starred together in Bringing Up Baby (1938), Holiday (1938), and The Philadelphia Story (1940).

Grant's performance as a dashing rogue sees him incorporate a Cockney accent and remains widely considered the first time Grant's famous personality began to register on film. (Grant used the Cockney accent in only a few other films, notably 1939's Gunga Din, 1943's Mr. Lucky and Clifford Odets's None but the Lonely Heart in 1944.) Cockney was not, however, Cary Grant's original accent. He was born and grew up in Bristol, which has a very different accent from that of London, where he only spent part of two years in his mid-teens working with a vaudeville troupe. In the U.S., by sixteen, he began to attempt to sound more American to broaden the range of theatre roles for which he could be cast a decade before he ever appeared in a Hollywood "talkie".

== Plot ==
In Marseilles, Henry Scarlett and his daughter, Sylvia, are mourning the death of Sylvia's mother. Henry complains that he has gambling debts and must leave the country. Sylvia reveals that her mother left her a little money and offers to give it to him. Henry wants to escape on his own and not arouse suspicion by traveling with a young girl, so Sylvia insists that she go along and decides to pose as a boy for safety and practicality. Henry also plans to smuggle yards of lace into England to avoid paying import duty and then sell it on the black market. Henry stole the lace from the factory where he was a bookkeeper for 20 years, along with company funds that he used for gambling.

On the channel ferry to London, they meet a "gentleman adventurer," Jimmy Monkley. After several drinks, Henry explains his smuggling plan to Monkley, who exposes Henry to customs officials. Henry is taken in, the lace is confiscated and his money is taken to pay the fine. Henry meets Sylvia/Sylvester on the dock, and they race for the train. They are shocked to find Monkley in their compartment, and he reimburses Henry for the money that was taken. He admits telling a customs official about Henry to avoid being searched himself and reveals the jewels he is smuggling.

The trio join forces and try to run con games together but are unsuccessful. Reading in the society column that a wealthy family has departed their London for a cruise, Monkley takes Henry to their home where he knows the house maid Maudie. At first they deceive her into putting on her employer's elegant dress and pearls, with the aim of stealing the jewels. But Sylvia/Sylvester, who followed them into the house and has been drinking, exposes their plan. She forces Monkley to give the pearls back to Maudie, who decides to join them as they travel to the seaside.

Posing as a traveling troupe of entertainers, the four of them perform for a rowdy local crowd. One of the hecklers, a roguish artist named Michael Fane, catches the interest of Sylvia. But she is disappointed when his former girlfriend, Lily Levitsky, returns. Lily taunts a drunken Henry into thinking that Maudie has run off with another man, and when Maudie returns, Sylvia punches Lily for distressing her father. The next day, Sylvia decides to reveal her true identity to Michael. He teases and flirts with her, but then an apologetic Lily returns and sees Sylvia in a dress. The disappointed Sylvia runs off and encounters Monkley on the way back to their caravan. Later that night, during a wild storm, Henry runs out of the caravan after Maudie, who has run off with another man.

In the morning, Sylvia and Monkley find Henry's body on the rocks below near the beach. He talks Sylvia into agreeing to join forces, but she rejects his attempt to kiss her. Sylvia hears a woman screaming from the rough sea below and rescues the woman, who turns out to be Lily. Sylvia hopes to reunite her with Michael and goes to fetch him, but when they return, the caravan is gone. Michael and Sylvia head out in his car to search for Monkley and Lily, but are stopped for speeding and spend a night in jail. After being released, they take the train to Paris where they discover Lily and Monkley. Instead of confronting their former partners, Michael and Sylvia reveal their feelings toward each other, and they leave the train together.

== Cast ==
- Katharine Hepburn as Sylvia Scarlett / Sylvester
- Cary Grant as Jimmy Monkley
- Brian Aherne as Michael Fane
- Edmund Gwenn as Henry Scarlett
- Dennie Moore as Maudie (uncredited)
- Natalie Paley as Lily (uncredited - although her costume designer is credited: “Costumes for Miss Paley by Bernard Newman”)
- Lennox Pawle as the drunk (uncredited)

== Reception ==
After a disastrous test screening, Cukor and Hepburn reportedly begged producer Pandro Berman to shelve the picture if they agreed to make their next film for free. According to RKO records, the film lost a whopping $363,000, and thus began a downturn in Hepburn's career (causing her to be branded "box office poison") from which she would eventually recover.

In a review published two days before his death, Andre Sennwald of the New York Times wrote "With what accuracy Compton Mackenzie's novel has been transferred to the screen this deponent knoweth not. But the film has a sprawling, confused and unaccented way of telling its story that might easily be the result of too literal a dramatization of just that sprawling kind of book." Variety wrote "Despite good production values and some strong performances, 'Sylvia Scarlett' is not a reliable candidate for public favor. The story is hard to get. It is puzzling in its tangents and sudden jumps plus the almost poetic lines that are given to Miss Hepburn. At moments the film skirts the border of absurdity and considerable of its mid-section is downright boresome." The review added that "Cary Grant, doing a petty English crook with a Soho accent, practically steals the picture."

Harrison's Reports stated "The material in the two novels, from which this story was supposedly taken, could have made an outstanding picture. But it was altered radically and was weakened, with the result that it has made an uninteresting comedy. The story is far-fetched and somewhat unpleasant. And the fact that Miss Hepburn goes through most of the picture in male attire may disappoint her followers." John Mosher of The New Yorker was positive and found that despite Hepburn's difficult role, the picture was "charming, sparkling with the feeling that Compton Mackenzie gave his novel of romantic vagrants. Indeed, it is that part of the film with Hepburn in breeches that is best. When at last she puts on skirts and is a girl again, and a girl in love, she is more like most of the movie heroines we have known, and the fantasy fades out in an almost perfunctory happy ending." The Monthly Film Bulletin wrote "A very entertaining film. Parts of the story are a trifle illogical but the direction, acting and some very delightful photography make it seem almost possible."

A Turner Classic Movies article suggested that the film's themes of sexual politics were ahead of its time and that the film's reception has improved over the years. In 1998, Jonathan Rosenbaum of the Chicago Reader included the film in his unranked list of the best American films not included on the AFI Top 100.

The film is mostly known for its queer elements, with Hepburn's character continuing to do drag even after it is not necessary anymore for the character, which "confused and disconcerted in equal measures." It is considered that the sexual ambiguities and gender misunderstandings of the films were too daring for the time period, which made the audiences fail to see the humor in cross-dressing and mistaken identity. It also resulted in movie audiences walking away from the movie, especially since it was insinuated or shown that both male and female characters were attracted to Hepburn's character, in and out of drag. While in drag, Sylvia is kissed by a woman, and Monkley comments that he'd made "a proper hot water bottle" when they are changing to go to sleep. At the same time, Fane shows more interest in Sylvia while in drag, and losing it after she revealed she is a woman.

Some have argued that "Gender as a separate concept from sexuality or physical sex wouldn’t come about for another twenty years, so audiences had no context for Sylvia’s odd apparel" throughout the movie. Nevertheless, the film is considered one of the few of the Golden Age of Hollywood to represent queerness respectfully. It is now seen as "a monument to the sapphic impression Hepburn left in Hollywood", with the film implying "that Sylvia might stay as Sylvester forever," even as she enters a relationship with a man. Some, on the other hand, have considered that "these deliciously cheeky invitations are met with sexual panic and a predictable retreat into befrocked femininity."

== See also ==
- List of cult films
- Sinister Street
