= Chedington =

Village in Dorset, England

Coordinates: 50°50′49″N 2°43′43″W

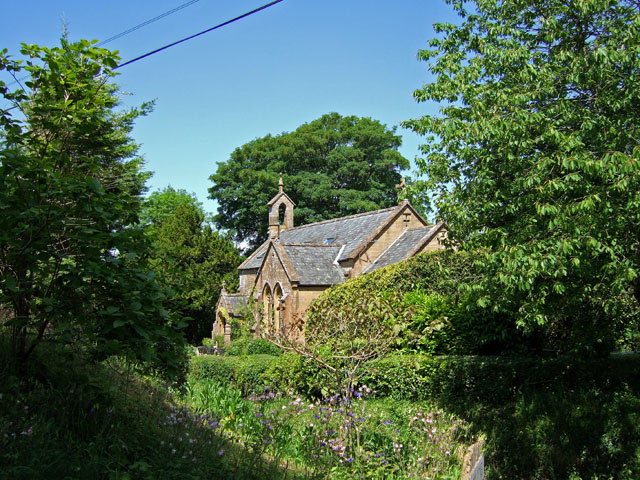
- Old parish church of St James

- Location within Dorset
- Population: 130
- OS grid reference: ST489056
- Unitary authority: Dorset
- Ceremonial county: Dorset
- Region: South West
- Country: England
- Sovereign state: United Kingdom
- Post town: Beaminster
- Postcode district: DT8
- Police: Dorset
- Fire: Dorset and Wiltshire
- Ambulance: South Western
- UK Parliament: West Dorset

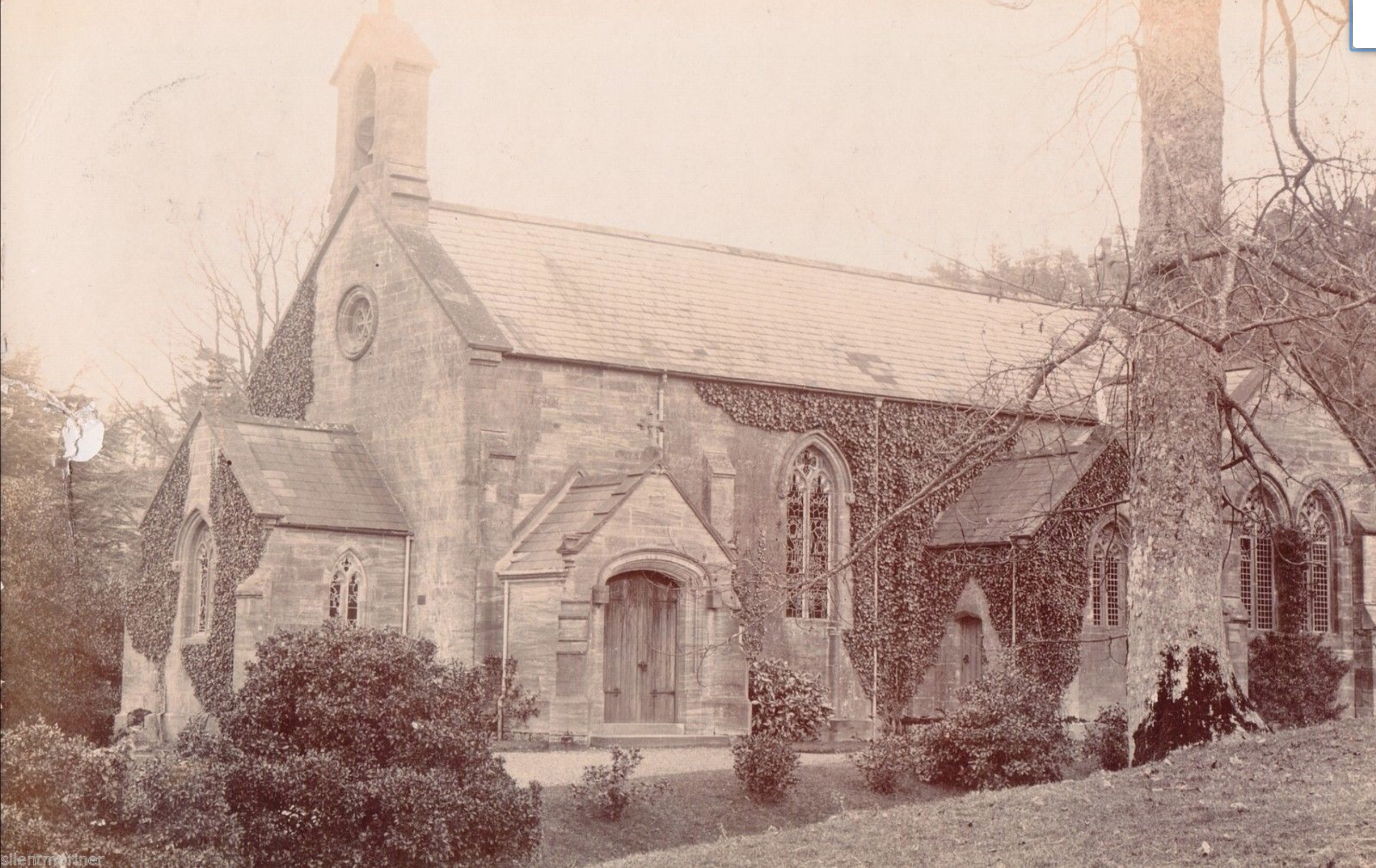
St James church, postcard c.1906

Chedington is a small village and civil parish in west Dorset, England, situated near the A356 road 4 miles (6.4 km) southeast of Crewkerne in Somerset. Dorset County Council estimate that in 2013 the population of the civil parish was 130. It is administered as part of Parrett and Axe Parish Council.

The village lies between the headwaters of the River Parrett, to the north, and the River Axe to the south. The Parrett flows in a northerly direction to the Bristol Channel at Bridgwater, whilst the Axe flows south to the English Channel at Axmouth, thus locating Chedington on the watershed of England's South West Peninsula.

== Chedington early references ==
The name of the village is Old English for 'the farm of a man named Cedd', but it was not included in the Domesday Book, being first mentioned over 100 years later in 1194. It grew up around Chedington Court, although it was the neighbouring village of South Perrott that provided the tradesmen needed to service the estate. Chedington Court itself was completely rebuilt in 1840 by the then owner William Trevelyan Cox, as a flamboyant, Jacobean-style mansion where curvilinear gables feature prominently. Across the narrow thoroughfare, directly opposite to Chedington Court, is the 16th-century Manor Farm, much altered in the 17th c. The porch of this dressed-stone building, bears the inscription "Thomas Warren 1634". Lower Farm, house 250 yards S.W. of the church, is of two storeys built in the 17th century.

As John Marius Wilson (1805–1885) put it in the Imperial Gazetteer of England & Wales 1870-2, most of Chedington's eminences command superb views, with Somerset's Mendip Hills and Hamdon Hills, from which much of Chedington itself is hewn, to the North-East. "Tucked into the deep hills of western Dorset, just off the major tourist routes across England, Chedington is so small that its handful of cottages doesn't even appear on some large-scale maps. Here, far from crowds that haunt Blenheim Palace, Stonehenge, Stratford-upon-Avon, or Haworth, I find the England of my dreams--quiet, pastoral, and sometimes endearingly eccentric...."

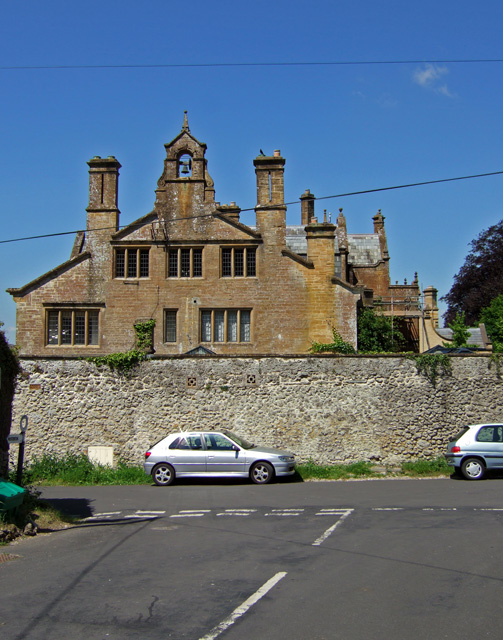
Chedington Court

It is probable Charles II of England whilst on the run after the Battle of Worcester in September 1651, travelled through or close by Chedington and Winyard's Gap on his circuitous six-week journey to escape. He had travelled from the battlefield through a series of safe-houses through Castle Cary to Trent Manor House and then to Charmouth staying at the Queen's Arms. Continuing to Bridport on the coast before turning back to Broadwindsor staying at the George Inn. He returned to Trent Manor House again and continued to Mere, Wiltshire and eventually to Shoreham-by-Sea where he made his successful escape.

== Chedington Court ==
Chedington Court, which dates from 1285, was re-built in old Ham Stone in Jacobean-style in 1840, a Grade II listed property with grounds and parkland of 31 acres which included the source of the River Parrett, with that of the Axe being nearby. By 1855 it was occupied by William Trevelyan Cox JP followed by Captain William Trevelyan Hody JP in 1889. Then Sir Henry Peto, son of the Victorian railway magnate Morton Peto bought Chedington Court and its estate in 1893. He became High Sheriff in 1897 and Deputy Lieutenant for the county of Dorset. Like so many families they lost two sons in the Great War, the heir to the estate, 30-year-old Captain Henry Peto of the 10th Royal Hussars, who fell in the first Battle of Ypres in November 1914 and later the 27-year-old Sapper Walter Samuel Peto of the Royal Engineers killed while on patrol in Salonika December 1917. Sir Henry and Lady Peto lived in the house until his death in 1938.

By the early 1980s it had become a hotel, a small seven-bedroom country house property run by Philip and Hilary Chapman. Hilary had developed a fine culinary reputation in the kitchen, whilst Philip concentrated on front of house. It had received good reviews, including The New York Times in June 1987, "Ten acres of garden containing a lovely variety mature trees and shrubs. There were sweeping lawns, elegant terraces and a summer house nestling under an ancient yew hedge close to a landscaped pool. We saw a croquet lawn, a putting green, and even a helicopter landing ground. Inside, a marvellous oak staircase sets the tone for the whole house which featured heavy brass door handles, leaded lights in stone mullions and gleaming polished oak floors with beautiful oriental carpets. Most of the furniture was Victorian. One of the rooms had a fine thirties suite from the old RMS Queen Mary" and The Washington Post in March 1991. The Chapmans' invested in a new 9-hole Chedington Court Golf Club at South Perrott designed by David Hemstock in August 1991 later extended to 18-holes, with club professional Simon Tucker.

However, the hotel was sold in 1997 to Canadian businessman Brendan Clouston for £1.2 million and returned to residential use, upsetting the local villagers in the process. Apparently, he let off some birthday fireworks for his wife, which reportedly frightened the neighbours and caused livestock to panic. On the market again in 2003 for £5.95 million, after Clouston left for Scotland. The golf course went into receivership in August 2010, finally closed in December and returned to farm pasture. On the market again in 2015, the Chedington Court Estate is now owned by the Guy family who have grown the Estate which now encompasses an events and wellness venue and a world-class equestrian centre. Dr Geoffrey Guy is founding partner of GW Pharmaceuticals.

== Chedington church (deconsecrated) ==
The site of the Old Church and Churchyard lies about 50 yards North East of the Victorian Church and now forms part of the private gardens of Chedington Court. A transcript record of some of the memorials between 1713 and 1971 feature on Dorset Online Parish Council (OPC)

The Victorian Parish Church, built c.1840-1, by Richard Carver (architect) (1792-1862) of Taunton. Formerly dedicated to St James, was made redundant in 1980 and has since been converted into a private dwelling. A grade II listed building since 1966. Originally consisting solely of nave and chancel, the church has Ham stone ashlar walls, a chamfered plinth, a slate roof with stone gable-copings and a scallop-shell motif above the doorway. The bell-cote housed a single bell, said to date from 1610. Later, George Vialls was commissioned to add an organ chamber, a baptistery and the south porch. The building was in service for less than 140 years before it was deconsecrated, its bell dismounted and its internal fixtures removed.
Chedington parish is now combined with that of South Perrott The 13th c. Parish Church of St. Mary can be found in the southern part of that village.

== Village pub and Winyard's Gap ==
At the north end of the village where the village road meets the A356 is a 17th century pub known as Winyard's Gap Inn. The Inn's previous name was the Three Horse Shoes. It became part of the Dorset backdrop for character statements featured in a series of trials at the Old Bailey in 1753. One of the most famous English criminal mysteries of the 18th century. It involved Mary Squires, an ageing gypsy, accused with Mrs Susannah 'Mother' Wells of carrying out an abduction (Elizabeth Canning) for prostitution, as brothel matrons. They protested they were scapegoats. Mary Squires counter-claimed that she was with the smugglers, in Abbotsbury and Chedington, at the time when the prosecution accused her of cavorting with highwaymen. The magistrate was Henry Fielding (1707–54), who had used similar character material in his earlier novel Tom Jones. He allowed dubious evidence from Elizabeth Canning (1734–73) and an even less credible account from a young lady named Virtue Hall. Squires and Wells were tried and convicted. The newly elected Lord Mayor of London, a notable humanitarian and freeman of the Brewers' Company named Sir Crisp Gascoyne (1700–61), reviewed fresh evidence and eventually, Mary Squires secured a pardon, but Susannah Wells, was less fortunate as she had already been hanged. Years later the story would be re-told in Thomas Hardy's 1906 narrative poem 'A Trampwoman's Tragedy'.

The Inn marks the western end of the Dorset Downs. The wooded viewpoint ridge looks north across most of Somerset from a strategic chalky pass into the Dorset downs. Along here, through Winyard's Gap, King Charles led his troops after successful West Country campaigns in 1644 in England during the Civil War.

After the First World War, the National Trust, which owns Winyard's Gap, donated 16 acres of land here for a memorial to the 43rd (Wessex) Infantry Division of the Dorsetshire Regiment and a replica of the monument found on Hill 112 at Caen in Normandy was erected.

== River Parrett Trail ==
Chedington is the starting point of the 50 miles (80 km) long River Parrett Trail, a long-distance footpath along the route of the River Parrett, which rises in the village. It passes many landmarks and places of interest including; Burrow Hill Cider Farm, Muchelney Abbey, West Sedgemoor, the Blake Museum, Westonzoyland Pumping Station Museum, the site of the Battle of Sedgemoor (July 1685) and finally discharging into Bridgwater Bay.
