= Christopher Stone (broadcaster) =

British radio presenter and DJ (1882–1965)

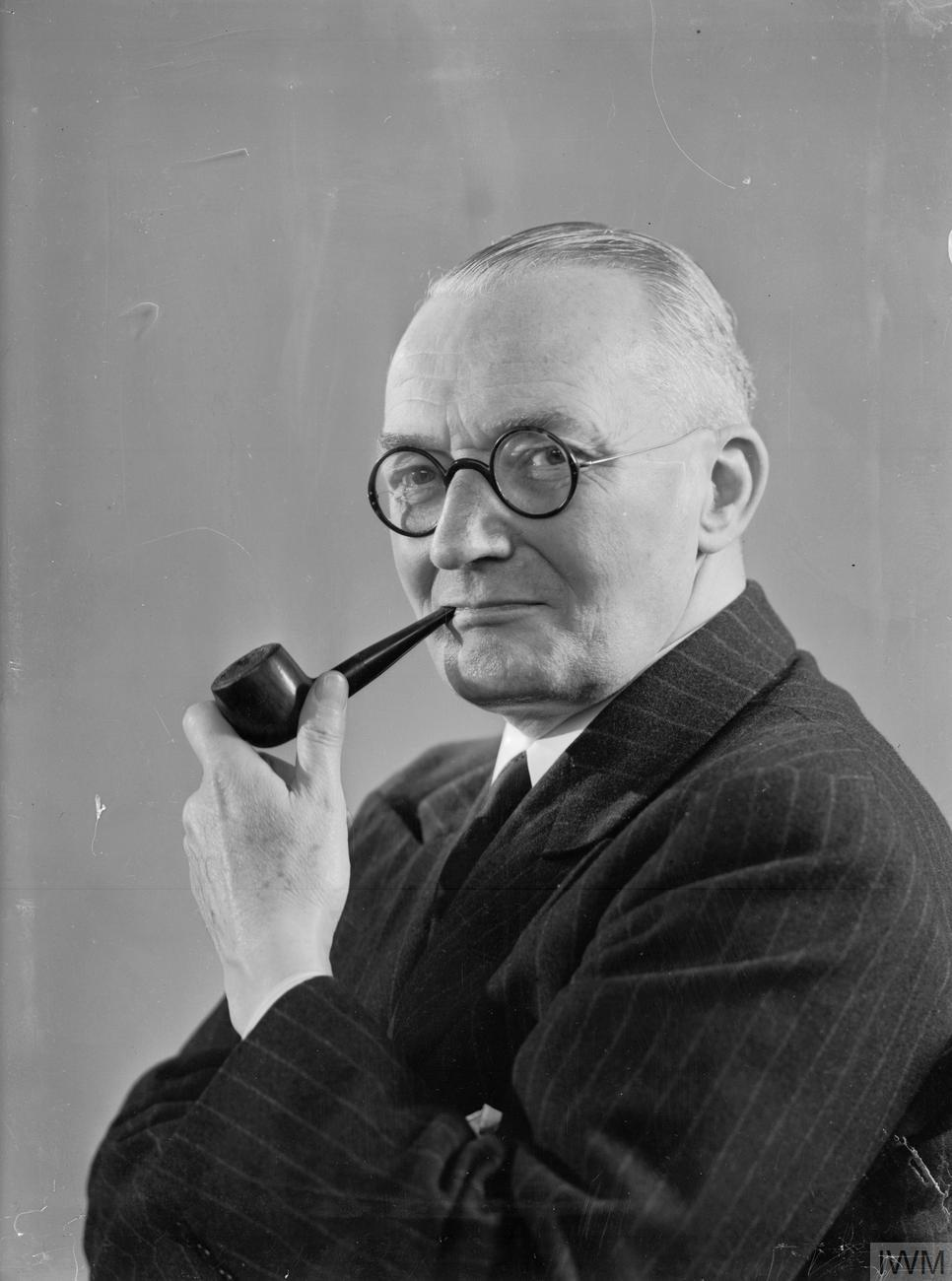
Stone in 1945

Christopher Reynolds Stone (19 September 1882 – 22 May 1965) was a British radio broadcaster who in 1927 became the first disc jockey in the United Kingdom. He was co-founder of the music magazine The Gramophone. In addition to his reviews and articles in the magazine he wrote eight novels between 1907 and 1927, and edited collections of poetry and letters.

== Life and career ==
=== Early years ===
Stone was born at Eton (now in Berkshire but then in Buckinghamshire) on 19 September 1882, the younger son of the Rev Edward Daniel Stone, an assistant master at Eton College, and his wife, Elizabeth, née Vidal. He was educated at Eton (King's Scholar) and then at Christ Church, Oxford, where he was awarded an open scholarship. In 1906 he published a book of sea songs and ballads. A reviewer commented, "Christopher Stone has rendered a public service in rescuing from the danger of oblivion many of those fine old sea songs which have played no inconsiderable part in keeping alive traditions of our naval and mercantile service".

In 1908, aged 26, Stone married Alice-Emily Chinnery, a wealthy widow 21 years his senior, by this marriage he became the step-father of Esmé Chinnery who was four years his junior. (Note: His wife's first husband, Walter Moresby Chinnery, died in 1905 aged 61, leaving her nearly £200,000 in his will.) In 1914, when the First World War began, he enlisted in the Middlesex Regiment, and in the following year was commissioned in the Royal Fusiliers. He served throughout the war, was awarded the Distinguished Service Order and the Military Cross, and was three times mentioned in dispatches. He was promoted to major in 1917 and was appointed aide-de-camp to General Pereira, commander of the 2nd Infantry Division in 1918.

=== The Gramophone and broadcasting ===
Returning to civilian life, Stone continued as a writer; he wrote eight novels during the course of his career. In 1923 he published a history of his battalion of the Royal Fusiliers. In the same year he agreed to join his brother-in-law, Compton Mackenzie, in founding a magazine specialising in record reviews. Mackenzie later recalled:

I wrote to my brother-in-law Christopher Stone to ask if he would like to take up half of £2000 to launch a new paper called The Gramophone. He wrote back to say that he thought it was a venturesome undertaking in view of the development of wireless which would soon make the gramophone obsolete. I do not fancy that I convinced him by my argument that the wireless could not harm but would in all probability help the gramophone. However, he agreed more out of good nature than conviction to become a partner.

The two, together with Mackenzie's wife, Faith, Alec Robertson and others, contributed the reviews and articles. Mackenzie first met John Reith, head of the BBC, in the same year, and in 1927 the BBC invited him to broadcast a programme of gramophone records with his linking comments. As, unlike Stone, he did not live in London and was a busy novelist he would not commit himself to regular broadcasting and Stone was invited to take his place.

He was described as "Britain's first disc jockey", although he disliked the term. An obituarist described him as "the man whose friendly, persuasive voice and casual manner charmed millions of radio listeners". A BBC colleague called him "incurably unassuming, a man with many graces but no airs". He himself said, "I never had any words written down. I insisted on being free to meander along in my own fashion and tell a few personal stories prompted by the records I played".

=== Later years ===
In 1935 Stone left the BBC to work for Radio Luxembourg; the BBC barred him as a paid performer but he was allowed to take part in BBC charity appeals, which raised £100,000 in four years. In 1937, as "Uncle Chris", he presented the first daily children's programme on commercial radio, The Kiddies Quarter Hour on Radio Lyons. (Note: Radio Lyons was the last of the major pre-war Continental stations to broadcast commercial programmes in English. Transmissions began on Sunday 1 November 1936.) Stone later rejoined the BBC and caused controversy on 11 November 1941 when he wished Victor Emmanuel, King of Italy, (with which Britain was at war) a happy birthday on air, adding "I don't think any of us wish him anything but good, poor soul". He continued to present programmes of records but also compèred live concerts and quizzes.

Stone's wife died in 1945. He moved from London to Eton, and after a two-year illness he died in a nursing home in Maidenhead on 22 May 1965, aged 82.

The Times obituary said of him:

As an amateur of the gramophone he set a fashion in broadcasting and pioneered the curious and exclusive profession based on the simple act of spinning a disc on a turntable, and talking amiably and informatively about it. He will be remembered for his disarmingly natural approach to broadcasting at a time when speakers, however eminent or original they may have been, were still subject to the tyranny of the script. [He had] a spontaneity and a deceptively effortless delivery which placed him at once on friendly terms with his listeners. His success had a lasting effect on the pattern of radio entertainment.

== Bibliography ==
Source: WorldCat

=== As author ===
- Eton Idylls. Oxford: B. H. Blackwell. 1902. OCLC 48383807.
- The Eton Glossary. Eton: Spottiswoode. 1903. OCLC 27044635.
- Scars: A Novel. London: Heinemann. 1907. OCLC 314544041.
- Eton. London: A. & C. Black. 1909. OCLC 1458834.
- Lusus. Oxford: B. H. Blackwell. 1909. OCLC 1072158151.
- They Also Serve: A Novel. London: Chatto & Windus. 1910. OCLC 5862652.
- The Noise of Life: A Novel. London: Chatto & Windus. 1910. OCLC 314544031.
- The Shoe of a Horse: A Novel. London: Chatto & Windus. 1912. OCLC 5862647.
- The Burnt House. London: Martin Secker. 1913. OCLC 4699177.
- The Valley of Indecision. London: Collins. 1920. OCLC 4683891.
- The Rigour of the Game. London: Martin Secker. 1922. OCLC 752972556.
- A History of the 22nd (Service) Battalion, Royal Fusiliers (Kensington). London: Old Comrades Association. 1923. OCLC 9587454.
- Flying Buttresses. London: A. M. Philpot. 1927. OCLC 37306514.
- Christopher Stone Speaking. London: E. Mathews & Marrot. 1933. OCLC 4901797.

=== As editor ===
- Sea Songs and Ballads. Oxford: Clarendon Press. 1906. OCLC 1490472.
- The Poems of William Collins. London: Frowde. 1907. OCLC 3193144.
- War Songs. Oxford: Clarendon Press. 1908. OCLC 2158987.
- Letters to an Eton Boy: A Selection from the Correspondence, etc., Received by George Beverley Fitz Grannet During his Last Year at School. London: T. F. Unwin. 1913. OCLC 976790478.

=== Other ===
- Sheffield, G. D.; G. I. S. Inglis, eds. (1989). From Vimy Ridge to the Rhine: The Great War Letters of Christopher Stone, DSO, MC. Crowood: Marlborough. ISBN 978-1-85223-202-3.

== Notes, references and sources ==
=== Sources ===
- Gifford, Denis (1985). The Golden Age of Radio: An Illustrated Companion. London: Batsford. ISBN 0-7134-4234-4.
- Mackenzie, Compton (1973). "Introduction". In Roger Wimbush (ed.). The Gramophone Jubilee Book. London: The Gramophone. OCLC 725893.
- Robertson, Alec (1973). "Reviewing the Records". In Roger Wimbush (ed.). The Gramophone Jubilee Book. London: The Gramophone. OCLC 725893.
