= The Darkening Green =

1934 novel

- First edition (UK)
- Author: Compton Mackenzie
- Language: English
- Genre: Drama
- Publisher: Cassell (UK); Doubleday Doran (US)
- Publication date: 1934
- Publication place: United Kingdom
- Media type: Print

The Darkening Green is a 1934 novel by the British writer Compton Mackenzie.

== Bibliography ==
- David Joseph Dooley. Compton Mackenzie. Twayne Publishers, 1974.
