= Paper Lives =

1966 novel

- First edition
- Author: Compton Mackenzie
- Language: English
- Genre: Comedy
- Publisher: Chatto and Windus
- Publication date: 1966
- Publication place: United Kingdom
- Media type: Print
- Preceded by: The Red Tapeworm

Paper Lives is a 1966 comedy novel by the British writer Compton Mackenzie. A satire on the Civil Service, it is a sequel to his 1941 novel The Red Tapeworm.

== Bibliography ==
- David Joseph Dooley. Compton Mackenzie. Twayne Publishers, 1974.
