= The Lunatic Republic =

1959 novel

- First edition
- Author: Compton Mackenzie
- Language: English
- Genre: Comedy
- Publisher: Chatto & Windus
- Publication date: 1959
- Publication place: United Kingdom
- Media type: Print

The Lunatic Republic is a 1959 comedy novel by the British writer Compton Mackenzie. It parodies the ongoing Space Race.

== Bibliography ==
- David Joseph Dooley. Compton Mackenzie. Twayne Publishers, 1974.
