= Fairy Gold =

1926 novel

- First edition (US)
- Author: Compton Mackenzie
- Language: English
- Genre: Drama
- Publisher: Cassell (UK); George H. Doran (US)
- Publication date: 1926
- Publication place: United Kingdom
- Media type: Print

Fairy Gold is a 1926 novel by the British writer Compton Mackenzie. A Cornish knight living on an island, who has lost his son during the First World War, resents a young English soldier stationed nearby.

== Bibliography ==
- David Joseph Dooley. Compton Mackenzie. Twayne Publishers, 1974.
- Andro Linklater. Compton Mackenzie: A Life Hogarth Press, 1992.
