= Crimean Tom =

Cat associated with the British Army

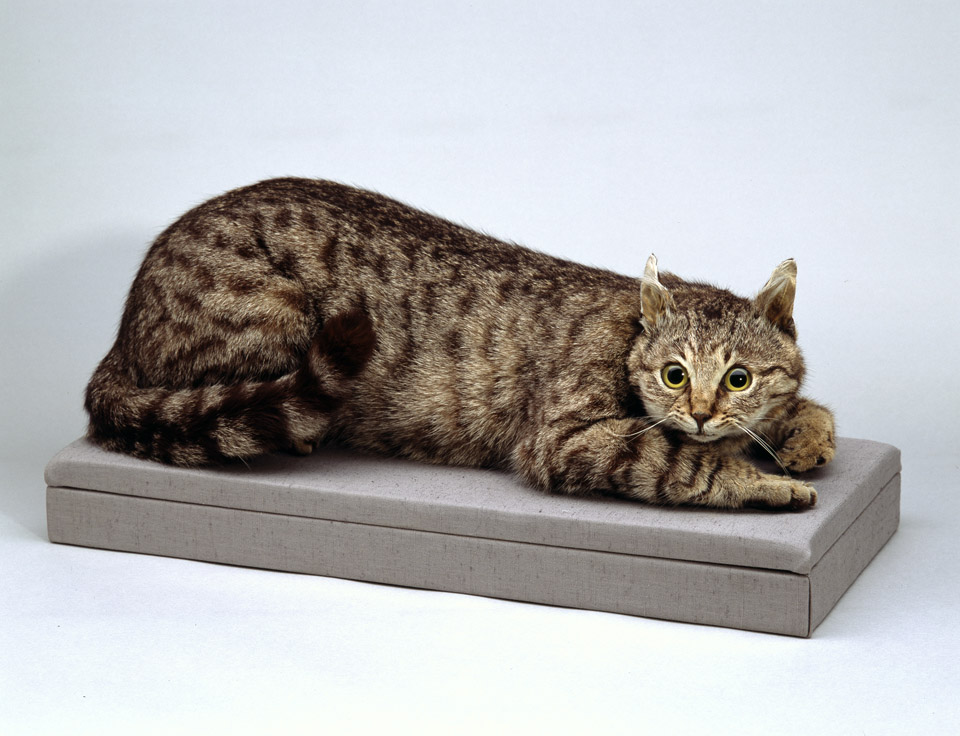
- The stuffed cat in the collection of the National Army Museum, London, purchased in the 1950s, that may be Tom
- Other names: Sevastopol Tom, Tom
- Species: Cat
- Sex: Male
- Born: c.1847
- Died: 31 December 1856
- Resting place: National Army Museum, London; 51.486111°N 0.16°W
- Known for: Leading British and French soldiers to food during the Crimean War
- Owner: Lieutenant William Gair

Crimean Tom (also known as Tom or Sevastopol Tom; c. 1847 – 31 December 1856) was a cat noted for his association with the British Army during the Crimean War. Found by Lieutenant William Gair in Sevastopol after a year-long siege, he is said to have led British forces to valuable caches of hidden supplies that helped ease starvation among the troops. Gair brought Tom back to England after the war but the cat died soon afterwards. He was stuffed and presented to the Royal United Services Institute. A stuffed cat bought in a flea market in the 1950s is in the collection of the National Army Museum and is sometimes described as being Tom, but there is no proof it is the same cat.

== Life ==
During the Crimean War British and French forces captured Sevastopol from the Russians on 9 September 1855 after an almost year-long siege. Lieutenant William Gair of the 6th Dragoon Guards, who was seconded to the Field Train Department as a deputy assistant commissary, led patrols to search the cellars of buildings for supplies. Gair noticed a cat, covered in dust and grime, that was sitting on top of a pile of rubbish between two injured people. The cat, unperturbed by the surrounding commotion, allowed himself to be picked up by Gair. The cat, estimated to have been 8 years old when found, had survived within the city throughout the siege.

Gair took the cat back to his quarters and he lived and ate with a group of British officers who initially named him Tom and later Crimean Tom or Sevastopol Tom. The occupying armies were struggling to find supplies, especially of food, in a city much-deprived by the year-long siege. It is said that the officers noticed how fat Tom was getting and realised he must have been feeding off a good supply of mice nearby. Knowing that the mice may themselves have been feeding off hidden Russian supplies, they followed Tom to an area cut off by rubble. Here, they found a storeroom with food supplies that helped to save British and French soldiers from starvation. Tom later led the officers to several smaller caches of supplies near the city docks. After the war ended Gair brought Tom back with him to England to keep as a pet but the cat died on 31 December 1856.

== Legacy ==
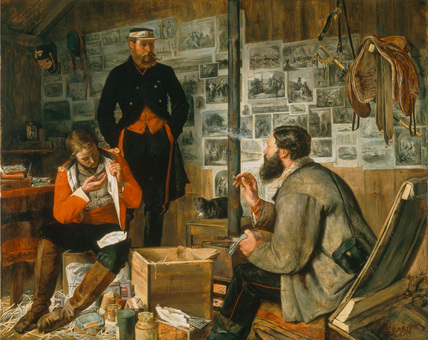
A Welcome Arrival, 1855, John Dalbiac Luard, 1857

Gair had Tom stuffed and presented to the Royal United Services Institution. A stuffed cat purchased at the Portobello Road market by Lady Faith Compton Mackenzie in the 1950s was identified as Crimean Tom but there is no proof it is the same cat. It was donated to the National Army Museum in 1958 and is on display there; however, the museum has not been able to confirm whether or not this is Crimean Tom.

Tom has popularly been identified as the cat asleep on a table next to a wood stove in the oil painting A Welcome Arrival, 1855 by John Dalbiac Luard, an 1857 work depicting British officers opening packages sent from home. It has been suggested that Gair is the red-coated figure at the left of the piece. The National Army Museum write, however, that "there is no evidence to substantiate any of these claims".

== See also ==
- List of individual cats
