= Extremes Meet =

1928 novel

- First edition (UK)
- Author: Compton Mackenzie
- Language: English
- Genre: Comedy thriller
- Publisher: Cassell
- Publication date: 1928
- Publication place: United Kingdom
- Media type: Print
- Followed by: The Three Couriers

Extremes Meet is a 1928 comedy thriller novel by the British writer Compton Mackenzie. It set in Southeastern Europe, and features the fictional British spy Roger Waterson who subsequently appeared in a sequel The Three Couriers published the following year.

== Bibliography ==
- Burton, Alan. Historical Dictionary of British Spy Fiction. Rowman & Littlefield, 2016.
