= Figure of Eight (novel) =

1936 novel

- 1950 Hutchinson
- Author: Compton Mackenzie
- Language: English
- Genre: Drama
- Publisher: Cassell
- Publication date: 1936
- Publication place: United Kingdom
- Media type: Print

Figure of Eight is a 1936 novel by the British writer Compton Mackenzie.

Figure of Eight was written within a month, consisting of more than 100,000 words.

== Bibliography ==
- David Joseph Dooley. Mackenzie Compton Mackenzie. Twayne Publishers, 1974.
- Andro Linklater. Compton Mackenzie: A Life Hogarth Press, 1992.
