= The Red Tapeworm =

1941 novel

- First edition
- Author: Compton Mackenzie
- Cover artist: Nigel Bentley
- Language: English
- Genre: Comedy
- Publisher: Chatto & Windus
- Publication date: 1941
- Publication place: United Kingdom
- Media type: Print

The Red Tapeworm is a 1941 comedy novel by the British writer Compton Mackenzie. It is a satire on the wartime economic measures imposed by the government during the Second World War.

== Bibliography ==
- Burton, Alan. Historical Dictionary of British Spy Fiction. Rowman & Littlefield, 2016.
