= The Ballet Girl (1916 film) =

1916 film

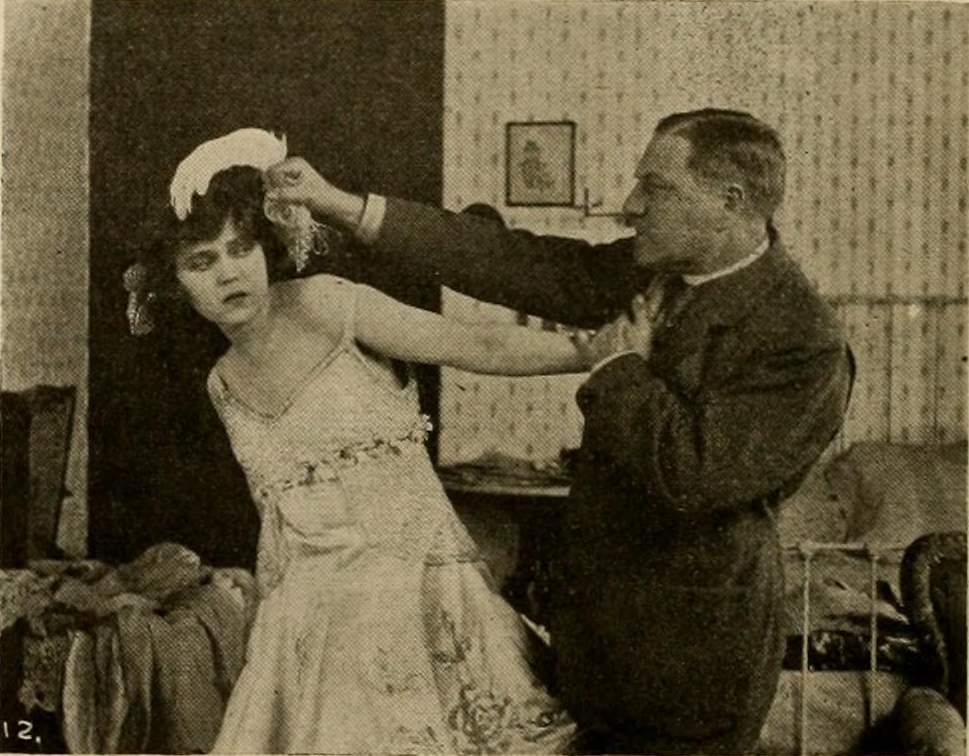
- Directed by: George Irving
- Written by: Compton MacKenzie
- Based on: Carnival by Compton Mackenzie
- Produced by: William A. Brady
- Starring: Alice Brady; Holbrook Blinn; Robert Frazer
- Production company: William A. Brady Picture Plays
- Distributed by: World Film
- Release date: January 24, 1916
- Running time: 50 minutes
- Country: United States
- Languages: Silent; English intertitles

The Ballet Girl is a 1916 American silent drama film directed by George Irving and starring Alice Brady, Holbrook Blinn and Robert Frazer. It is an adaptation of the 1912 novel Carnival by the British writer Compton Mackenzie.

== Cast ==
- Alice Brady as Jenny Pearl
- Holbrook Blinn as Zachary Trewehella
- Robert Frazer as Fred Pearl
- Julia Stuart as Mrs. Raeburn
- Harry Danes as Charles Raeburn
- Laura McClure as May Raeburn
- Jessie Lewis as Irene Dale
- Alec B. Francis as Jerry Vergoe
- George Relph as Maurice Avery
- Stanhope Wheatcroft as Fuzz Castleton
- Fred Radcliffe as Joe Cunningham
- Robert Kegerreis as Jack Danby

== Production ==
Production began in August, 1915. Director Joseph Smiley procured thirty dancers from the Metropolitan Opera House dancing school to be in scenes shot at Peerless Pictures Studios in Fort Lee, New Jersey. Upon seeing the film, William A. Brady disliked it and reshot much of the film himself.

== Preservation ==
With no holdings located in archives, The Ballet Girl is considered a lost film.

== Bibliography ==
- Goble, Alan. The Complete Index to Literary Sources in Film. Walter de Gruyter, 1999.
