= Buttercups and Daisies =

1931 comedy novel by British writer Compton Mackenzie

- Author: Compton Mackenzie
- Language: English
- Genre: Comedy
- Publication date: 1931
- Publication place: United Kingdom
- Media type: Print

Buttercups and Daisies is a 1931 comedy novel by the British writer Compton Mackenzie.

== Bibliography ==
- David Joseph Dooley. Compton Mackenzie. Twayne Publishers, 1974.
- Andro Linklater. Compton Mackenzie: A Life Hogarth Press, 1992.
