= Our Street =

1931 novel

- Author: Compton Mackenzie
- Language: English
- Genre: Historical
- Publisher: Cassell (UK); Doubleday Doran (US)
- Publication date: 1931
- Publication place: United Kingdom
- Media type: Print

Our Street is a 1931 historical novel by the British writer Compton Mackenzie.

== Bibliography ==
- David Joseph Dooley. Compton Mackenzie. Twayne Publishers, 1974.
