= Guy and Pauline =

1915 novel

- Author: Compton Mackenzie
- Language: English
- Genre: Drama
- Publication date: 1915
- Publication place: United Kingdom
- Media type: Print

Guy and Pauline is a 1915 novel by the British writer Compton Mackenzie. It was begun on Capri and written in three and a half months, and remained Mackenzie's favourite of his own works. It was published in America with the alternative title of Plashers Mead.

== Reception ==
Mr. Compton Mackenzie has, in fact, written a prose poem with intervals of narration.

== Bibliography ==
- Orel, Harold. Popular Fiction in England, 1914-1918. University Press of Kentucky, 1992.
