= Mary Theresa Vidal =

English novelist (1815–1873)

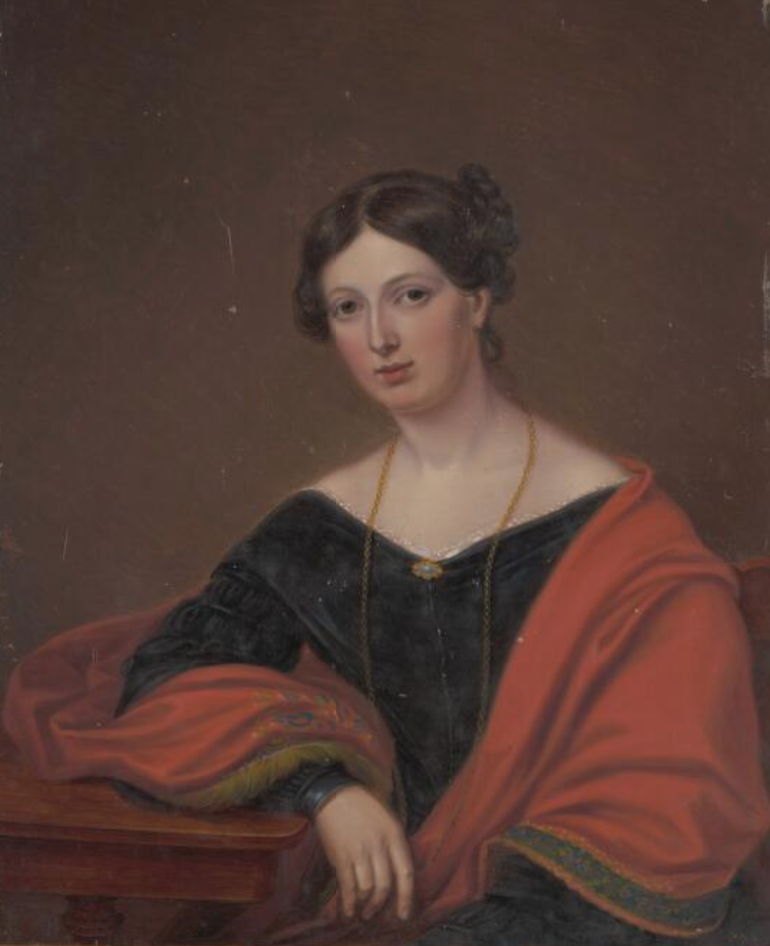
- Born: Mary Theresa Johnson; 1815; Torrington, Devon, England
- Died: 19 November 1873 (aged 58); Sutton, Suffolk, England
- Occupation: Author
- Spouse: Francis Vidal (m. 1835)
- Children: 7
- Relatives: William Johnson Cory (brother); George William Vidal (son)

Mary Theresa Vidal (1815 – 19 November 1873) was an English novelist who was among the first writers to publish fiction about Australian life. Born in Devon in 1815, she married a clergyman and moved to Australia in 1840, before returning to England five years later. While in Australia, she published a popular collection of Christian moral tales titled Tales for the Bush, intended to provide moral and religious guidance to convict and servant readers. Upon returning to England, Vidal continued to publish novels and short stories, several of which are set in Australia. Her writing often explored domestic morality and women's place in society.

== Life ==
Mary Theresa Vidal was born Mary Theresa Johnson in 1815 (Note: The Australian Dictionary of Biography reports that Vidal was baptised on 25 July, while the Dictionary of Literary Biography gives this date as her date of birth.) in Torrington, Devon, England. She was the daughter of William Charles Johnson and his wife Mary Theresa (née Furse). On 25 April 1835, she married a Jamaican-born curate named Francis Vidal in Ideford. He took up a position as the chaplain of Exeter Gaol and, over the next five years, Mary gave birth to three sons.

Mary and her husband moved to Sydney in 1840, joining Francis' brother George, who was the minister at Christ Church. Francis became the minister at Penrith. Mary and Francis spent the next five years living in various country parishes across the region to the south-west of Sydney, particularly in the area surrounding Cabramatta and, for a time, managed a property at Sutton Forest.

While in Australia, Mary wrote her first work of fiction, a collection of short stories titled Tales for the Bush. The collection was initially printed in 1844 in eight parts, each sold for sixpence, and was then published as a book in London in 1846. The collection consists of a set of short Christian moral tales intended to provide moral and religious guidance to working-class readers, particularly to Australia's growing population of convict young women employed as servants. Modelled on the Cheap Repository Tracts, the collection was a success; it was translated into Dutch, and four editions were published over the next seven years.

In 1845, Mary and her family returned to England, by which point she had given birth to another two children. They moved to Eton College, where her brother William Johnson Cory was a teacher, and began operating a residential house for Eton students. Her husband Francis became a tutor at the school. During their 14 years living at Eton, Mary gave birth to another two children and wrote a number of novels and short stories. Their daughter, Elizabeth Theresa "Lily", married Edward Daniel Stone who was at the time an assistant master at Eton.

She suffered from chronic tic douloureux, also known as trigeminal neuralgia, and other conditions. Later in life, Mary's husband was appointed to the parish of Sutton, Suffolk, England. She died at age 58 there on 19 November 1873 of meningitis.

== Writing ==
Vidal authored three full-length novels, in addition to various novellas and collections of short stories. Her first two novels, Florence Templar: or, My Aunt's Story and Ellen Raymond: or, Ups and Downs were published in 1856 and 1859 respectively and are set in England. Her third novel, Bengala: or, Some Time Ago, was published in London in two volumes in 1860. The novel is a romantic melodrama set in a New South Wales town, and depicts the economic and social problems of pioneer Australian society, as well as women's education and role in society.

Vidal's other work of fiction set in Australia was a novella, The Cabramatta Store, published in London in 1849. She donated the profits from the work to a fund for the construction of a cathedral in Sydney. Her later works of fiction largely consisted of moral tales and domestic stories, often focused on women's reliance on untrustworthy male characters. The scholar Susan Lever writes that Vidal "might be reinstated in Australian literary history as the founder of an alternative feminine literary tradition in which the celebrated masculine freedoms of Australia impose on the lives of women."

== Legacy and reception ==
Vidal has also been described as one of Australia's earliest women writers. Lever writes that despite the short time that Vidal spent living in Australia, her writing is noteworthy for being among the first published works of fiction about Australian life. Lever notes, however, that Vidal's writing largely consisted of domestic novels and didactic moral stories common in the English literature of her era, rather than belonging to a distinctly Australian literary genre. She distinguishes Vidal's focus on what she terms "domestic morality" from the works of the Australian male writers of her era, which were more likely to depict crime and adventure through themes such as bushranging. She suggests that Vidal's writing about religious duty and order may have helped to restore a sense of control and self-worth to the convict servant girls who made up the core of her readership in Australia.

Vidal's writing received relatively little attention from contemporary critics. It began to appear in later scholarly works on Australian literary history, but was generally regarded as being of largely historical rather than literary interest. Later critics often dismissed her work as overly didactic and as expressing the morality of the English middle class. Her novel Bengala was republished in 1990 in an edition edited by Susan Lever (then McKernan).

== Bibliography ==
- Tales for the Bush (1845)
- Winterton (1846)
- Esther Merle (1847)
- Cabramatta and Woodleigh Farm (1850)
- Florence Templar: or, My Aunt's Story (1856)
- Ellen Raymond (1859)
- Bengala: or, Some Time Ago (1860)
