= Carnival (Mackenzie novel) =

1912 novel

- Author: Compton Mackenzie
- Language: English
- Genre: Drama
- Publication date: 1912
- Publication place: United Kingdom
- Media type: Print

Carnival is a 1912 novel by the British writer Compton Mackenzie. A London ballet dancer falls in love with an aristocrat, but refuses to become his mistress and instead marries a Cornish farmer with ultimately tragic consequences. It was a commercial and critical success on its release.

== Film adaptations ==
It has been turned into films on three occasions: a 1916 American silent film The Ballet Girl directed by George Irving, a 1931 British film Dance Pretty Lady directed by Anthony Asquith and a 1946 British version Carnival by Stanley Haynes.

== Bibliography ==
- Goble, Alan. The Complete Index to Literary Sources in Film. Walter de Gruyter, 1999.
- McLean, Adrienne L. Dying Swans and Madmen: Ballet, the Body, and Narrative Cinema. Rutgers University Press, 2008.
