= E. V. Thompson =

English historical novelist (1931–2012)

E.V. Thompson
- Born: Ernest Victor Thompson; 14 July 1931; London, England, United Kingdom
- Died: 19 July 2012 (aged 81); Launceston, Cornwall
- Occupation: Author
- Known for: Historical novels

Ernest Victor Thompson MBE (14 July 1931 – 19 July 2012) was an English author of historical novels.

Thompson served in the Royal Navy for nine years and then joined the Bristol Police. He later became the chief security officer for the Department of Aviation in Rhodesia. In 1970 he moved to Cornwall to concentrate on being an author. Thompson specialised in historical novels mainly based in Cornwall and wrote over 40 books. His novel Chase the Wind was voted as the best historical novel of the year.

Thompson was appointed a Member of the Order of the British Empire in the 2012 New Year Honours for services to literature and the community in Cornwall.

Thompson was a resident of Sharptor, Cornwall and lived in Idle Cottage, one of the stone miners' cottages in lower Sharptor. He said The storylines come from researching. In my very first book I was sitting on the doorstep of an old miner's cottage, wondering about the people who lived there before - most probably Idle Cottage..

Thompson died on 19 July 2012 at his home at Launceston, Cornwall aged 81.

== Books ==
- 1977 Chase the Wind
- 1978 Harvest of the Sun
- 1979 Music Makers
- 1980 Ben Retallick
- 1981 The Dream Traders
- 1982 Singing Spears
- 1983 The Restless Sea
- 1984 100 Years on Bodmin Moor
- 1984 Cry Once Alone
- 1985 Republic
- 1985 Polrudden
- 1986 The Stricken Land
- 1988 Becky
- 1989 God's Highlander
- 1990 Lottie Trago
- 1991 Cassie
- 1992 Whychwood
- 1992 Blue Dress Girl
- 1993 Mistress of Polrudden
- 1994 Tolpuddle Woman
- 1995 Ruddlemoor
- 1996 Lewin's Mead
- 1996 Moontide
- 1997 Cast No Shadows
- 1997 Mud Huts and Missionaries
- 1998 Fires of Evening
- 1999 Here, There and Yesterday
- 1999 Homeland
- 1999 Somewhere a Bird is Singing
- 2000 Winds of Fortune
- 2001 Seek a New Dawn
- 2002 The Lost Years
- 2003 Paths of Destiny
- 2004 Tomorrow Is For Ever
- 2005 The Vagrant King
- 2006 Brothers in War
- 2007 Though the Heavens May Fall
- 2008 No Less Than the Journey
- 2009 Churchyard and Hawke
- 2010 Beyond the Storm
- 2012 Hawke's Tor
- 2012 The Bonds of Earth
