= Roman Holiday (novel) =

1931 novel by Upton Sinclair

- Author: Upton Sinclair
- Language: English
- Published: 1931
- Publisher: Farrar & Rinehart
- Publication place: United States

Roman Holiday is a 1931 novel by Upton Sinclair. It was published by Farrar & Rinehart.

Upton Sinclair is ingenious but unconvincing. He has tried to show that a capitalist civilization bears within it the germ of its own death; but what he suggests is merely that civilization moves in cycles.

— Time, 1931
