= Sylvia and Michael =

1919 novel

- Author: Compton Mackenzie
- Language: English
- Genre: Drama
- Publication date: 1919
- Publication place: United Kingdom
- Media type: Print

Sylvia and Michael is 1919 novel by the British writer Compton Mackenzie, sometimes known by the longer name The Later Adventures of Sylvia Scarlett. It was published as a sequel to the 1918 work Sylvia Scarlett, and it portrays the heroine's adventures in a number of European cities, including Paris, Kiev and Bucharest.

== Bibliography ==
- Orel, Harold. Popular Fiction in England, 1914-1918. University Press of Kentucky, 1992.
