= Roman Holiday (band) =

Alternative rock band from Seattle, Washington

- Origin: Seattle, Washington, United States
- Genres: Alternative rock
- Years active: 2008–2013
- Labels: Unsigned
- Members: Shane Lance; Emerson Shotwell; Daniel Collins; Nick Howard
- Past members: Nigel Finley

Roman Holiday is an alternative rock band from Seattle, Washington, United States. Formed in September 2008, the band comprises Shane Lance (lead vocals, guitar), Emerson Shotwell (drums, percussion), Daniel Collins (lead guitar, backing vocals), and Nick Howard (bass guitar, backing vocals). The Tacoma, Washington newspaper, the Weekly Volcano, noted "having been birthed in a recording studio means their sound was born running, and it really shows. They are the most radio-ready band in Tacoma, and to say that you should hurry and see them before they get big is no exaggeration."

In the local Seattle music scene, the band quickly became known for their groomed and "MTV-ready sound, comparable to chart-topping arena-rockers Coldplay and Kings of Leon".

== History ==
=== Formation ===
Shane Lance and Emerson Shotwell first met during elementary school. They began playing in bands throughout their junior high and high school days. Nick Howard, a childhood friend of Lance's, later joined the band to play bass. Originally a guitar player, Howard switched to bass. The trio, then nameless, played their first gig at a local coffeehouse, which Daniel Collins attended. After the gig, the coffee shop's manager suggested Collins as a potential lead guitar player to the band. A week later, Collins joined the band and the lineup was complete.

During this time, Lance was working at a local recording studio called Pacific Studios. He and studio owner Mark Simmons and Jeff Evans began talking about creating a pop-rock project. Simmons' interest was piqued in the band when they showcased their music for him in the studio. Simmons later took up manager and producer roles in the band. The band finally settled on their name, 'Roman Holiday', which was suggested by Simmons. According to Lance, "it was the only name the band didn't hate."

At this same time, Nigel Finley, also an employee at Pacific Studios, stepped in as keyboardist for the band. The quintet then began recording their debut EP, released in May 2009. Shortly after the EP's release, Finley left the band for personal reasons. In August 2009, the band began recording for their debut album at Pacific Studios. As the record went into production, the band tested their new sound by going on their first American west coast tour.

In January 2010, Roman Holiday locally released Paint This Town, to a sold-out theater. The day after the release show, the band departed for their second, extended American west coast tour.

== Live ==
According to the live review's section of the Weekly Volcano, "The music is good. It drives, it grooves, it occasionally soars. It does the things that a good pop rock band needs to do, and that so many crappy pop rock bands don't get - things with melody and harmony and backing vocals and dynamics."

== Discography ==
=== Roman Holiday (EP) ===
Released in May 2009. All songs written by Roman Holiday and Nigel Finley.

1. "I'll Be Here" - 4:07
2. "Show Your Face" - 4:24
3. "Broken Masterpiece" - 5:10
4. "Your Velvet Soul" - 4:37
5. "Devil" - 6:15
6. "Get It Back" - 3:42

=== Roman Holiday (limited edition acoustic EP) ===
Locally released in July 2009. Only 200 copies were produced. All songs, except "I Try", were also featured on Roman Holiday's album, Paint This Town. All songs written by Roman Holiday and Nigel Finley.

1. "I Try" - 6:48
2. "Anchor" - 4:55
3. "Your Velvet Soul" - 5:20
4. "Don't Come Around" - 3:01

=== Paint This Town ===
Internationally released on May 18, 2010. All songs written by Roman Holiday.

1. "Don't Come Around" - 3:12
2. "I Think It's Her" - 3:11
3. "Touch Your Coat" - 3:29
4. "Filthy Hands" - 3:54
5. "Anchor" - 4:25
6. "You Know He Knows" - 3:44
7. "Your Velvet Soul" - 3:46
8. "The Crown" - 3:00
9. "Pendulum" - 4:43
10. "Under The Ocean" - 4:59
