= The Monarch of the Glen (novel) =

1941 novel

- First edition
- Author: Compton Mackenzie
- Language: English
- Genre: Comedy
- Publisher: Chatto & Windus
- Publication date: 13 April 1941
- Publication place: London, United Kingdom
- Media type: Print (Hardcover and Paperback)
- OCLC: 4944480

The Monarch of the Glen is a Scottish comic farce novel written by English-born Scottish author Compton Mackenzie and published in 1941. The first in Mackenzie's Highland Novels series, it depicts the life in the fictional Scottish castle of Glenbogle. The title was a reference to the famous painting of the same name by Edwin Landseer.

The television programme Monarch of the Glen is very loosely based on the novel series.
