= Compton Mackenzie =

Scottish writer (1883–1972)

Sir Compton Mackenzie OBE
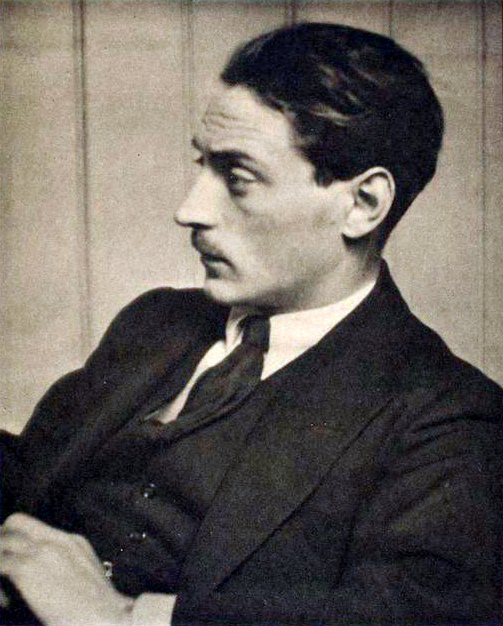
- Mackenzie in 1914
- Born: 17 January 1883; West Hartlepool, County Durham, England
- Died: 30 November 1972 (aged 89); Edinburgh, Midlothian, Scotland
- Resting place: Barra, Scotland
- Education: St Paul's School, London, Magdalen College, Oxford
- Occupations: Scottish croquet player; actor; broadcaster; writer; political activist
- Years active: 1907–1971
- Notable work: Whisky Galore; The Monarch of the Glen
- Spouses: Faith Stone (m. 1905; died 1960) Christine McSween (m. 1962; died 1963) Lilian McSween (m. 1965)
- Father: Edward Compton
- Relatives: Fay Compton (sister); Francis Compton (brother); Viola Compton (sister); Henry Compton (grandfather)

Sir Edward Montague Compton Mackenzie, OBE (17 January 1883 – 30 November 1972) was a Scottish writer of fiction, biography, histories and a memoir, as well as a cultural commentator, raconteur and lifelong Scottish nationalist. He was one of the co-founders in 1928 of the National Party of Scotland along with Hugh MacDiarmid, Cunninghame Graham and John MacCormick. He was knighted in the 1952 Birthday Honours List.

== Background ==
Edward Montague Compton Mackenzie was born in West Hartlepool, County Durham, England, into a theatrical family of Mackenzies, many of whose members used Compton as their stage surname, starting with his English grandfather Henry Compton, a well-known Shakespearean actor of the Victorian era. His father, Edward Compton Mackenzie, and mother, Virginia Frances Bateman, were actors and theatre company managers; his sister, Fay Compton (whose son was Anthony Pelissier, Compton's nephew), starred in many of J. M. Barrie's plays, including Peter Pan. He was educated at St Paul's School, London, and Magdalen College, Oxford, from where he graduated with a degree in Modern History. In 1910, he began a brief career as an actor at the Garrick theatre in The Bishop's Son by Hall Caine. From there he joined the satirical theatrical troupe The Follies under the management of the comedian and impresario H. G. Pélissier at the Apollo, Shaftesbury Avenue as a song lyricist and sketch writer. Within a year their relationship became estranged over the marriage of his sister Fay, aged 17, to the 37-year-old Pélissier. It was then that he took up novel writing as a full-time career, bolstered by the success of his early best-seller Carnival (1912), partly based on his experience with The Follies.

== Writing ==
Mackenzie is perhaps best known for two comic novels set in Scotland: Whisky Galore (1947) set in the Hebrides, and The Monarch of the Glen (1941) set in the Scottish Highlands. They were the sources of a successful film and a television series, respectively. He published almost a hundred books on different subjects, including ten volumes of autobiography: My Life and Times (1883–1963). He wrote history (on the Battle of Marathon and the Battle of Salamis), biography (Mr Roosevelt, a 1943 biography of FDR), literary criticism, satires, apologia (Sublime Tobacco 1957), children's stories, poetry and so on. Of his fiction, The Four Winds of Love is sometimes considered his magnum opus. He was admired by F. Scott Fitzgerald, whose first book, This Side of Paradise, was written under the literary influence of Compton.

Sinister Street, his lengthy 1913–14 Bildungsroman, influenced George Orwell and Cyril Connolly, who both read it as schoolboys. Max Beerbohm praised Mackenzie's writing for vividness and emotional reality. Frank Swinnerton, a literary critic, comments on Mackenzie's "detail and wealth of reference". Sir John Betjeman said of it, "This has always seemed to me one of the best novels of the best period in English novel writing." Henry James thought it to be the most remarkable book written by a young author in his lifetime. After his conversion to Roman Catholicism in 1914, Mackenzie explored religious themes in a trilogy of novels, The Altar Steps (1922), The Parson's Progress (1923) and The Heavenly Ladder (1924).

In 1922, Robin Legge, chief music critic of The Daily Telegraph, encouraged Mackenzie to write some of the earliest gramophone record reviews. In 1923, he and his brother-in-law Christopher Stone founded The Gramophone, the still-influential classical music magazine. Mackenzie continued to edit the magazine until 1961. He was also the literary critic for the London-based national newspaper Daily Mail.

Following his time on Capri, socialising with the gay exiles there, he treated the homosexuality of a politician sensitively in Thin Ice (1956). The Lunatic Republic (1959) is a political satire. For the version of English spoken by the inhabitants of Lunamania on the far side of the Moon, Mackenzie invented over 150 new words.

== Greek Memories ==
Mackenzie worked as an actor, political activist and broadcaster. He served with British Intelligence in the Eastern Mediterranean during the First World War, later publishing four books on his experiences. According to these books, he was commissioned in the Royal Marines, rising to the rank of captain. His ill-health making front-line service impractical, he was assigned counter-espionage work during the Gallipoli campaign, and, in 1916, built up a considerable counter-intelligence network in Athens, Greece then being neutral. He is alleged to have taken part in an attempt to assassinate the King by poison in August 1916, during which the royal palace was to be surrounded by fire to prevent him escaping. While his secret service work seems to have been valued highly by his superiors, including Sir Mansfield Smith-Cumming, his passionate political views, especially his support for the Venizelists, made him a controversial figure and he was expelled from Athens following the Noemvriana.

In 1917, he founded the Aegean Intelligence Service, and enjoyed considerable autonomy for some months as its director. He was offered the Presidency of the Republic of Cerigo, which was briefly independent while Greece was split between Royalists and Venizelists, but declined the office. He was recalled in September 1917. Smith-Cumming considered appointing him as his deputy, but withdrew the suggestion after opposition from within his own service, and Mackenzie played no further active role in the war. In 1919, he was appointed an Officer of the Order of the British Empire (OBE), and was also honoured with the French Legion of Honour, the Serbian Order of the White Eagle, and the Greek Order of the Redeemer.

After the publication of his Greek Memories in 1932, he was prosecuted the following year at the Old Bailey under the Official Secrets Act for quoting from supposedly secret documents. His account of the trial, vividly described, is in Octave Seven (1931–38) of his autobiography: the result was a fine of £100 and (prosecution) costs of £100. His own costs were over £1,000. Mackenzie states that a plea-bargain (described in the text as "an arrangement") had been reached with the judge prior to the trial: in exchange for his pleading guilty, he would be fined £500 with £500 costs. However, Sir Thomas Inskip, then attorney general who prosecuted the case, succeeded in annoying the trial judge to such an extent that he then reduced the penalties to a token amount. Even so, the costs of his defence and the withdrawal from sale of Greek Memories left Mackenzie out of pocket and an attempt was made to ask the authorities exactly which passages in the book they objected to so it could be re-issued with the offending material removed. This approach was rebuffed. In Octave Eight, covering the years 1939–45, Mackenzie recounts that the matter was raised in Parliament and a new version of Greek Memories was eventually published in 1939. However, in spite of the withdrawal of the first edition a copy had already been deposited at the British Museum (which then contained what is now the independent British Library) but was not given a general catalogue reference making it effectively impossible to access. In 1994, The Guardian newspaper published an article about this anomaly The Muzzling of Compton Mackenzie – 62 years on. Following this the 1932 edition was entered in the British Library's public catalogue. In 2011, Biteback published the original 1932 edition of Greek Memories, including the Secret Intelligence Service memo detailing the offending passages of the book.

He was president of the Croquet Association from 1953 to 1966. He was president of the Siamese Cat Club. He was the subject of This Is Your Life in 1956 when he was surprised by Eamonn Andrews at the King's Theatre, Hammersmith, London.

A strong supporter of Edward VIII, Mackenzie was a leading member of the Octavians, a minor society that campaigned in support of Edward VIII and for his return to the UK after he became the Duke of Windsor. According to a 1938 Time article, Mackenzie had intended to write a book in support of Edward, but abandoned the plan when the Duke asked him not to publish.

== Capri ==
Between 1913 and 1920, he lived with his wife, Faith, on Capri at Villa Solitaria, and returned to visit in later years. This Italian island near Sorrento was known to be tolerant not just of foreigners in general, but of artists and homosexuals in particular. He became friends with the writer Somerset Maugham, a frequent visitor to the island. Faith had an affair with the Italian pianist Renata Borgatti, who was connected to Romaine Brooks.

Compton Mackenzie's observations on the local life of the Italian islanders and foreign residents led to at least two novels, Vestal Fire (1927) and Extraordinary Women (1928). The latter, a roman à clef about a group of lesbians arriving on the island of Sirene, a fictional version of Capri, was published in Britain in the same year as two other ground-breaking novels with lesbian themes, Virginia Woolf's love letter to Vita Sackville-West, Orlando, and Radclyffe Hall's controversial polemic, The Well of Loneliness, but Mackenzie's satire did not attract legal attention. He was a friend of Axel Munthe, who built Villa San Michele, and Edwin Cerio, who later became mayor of Capri.

== Scottish identity ==
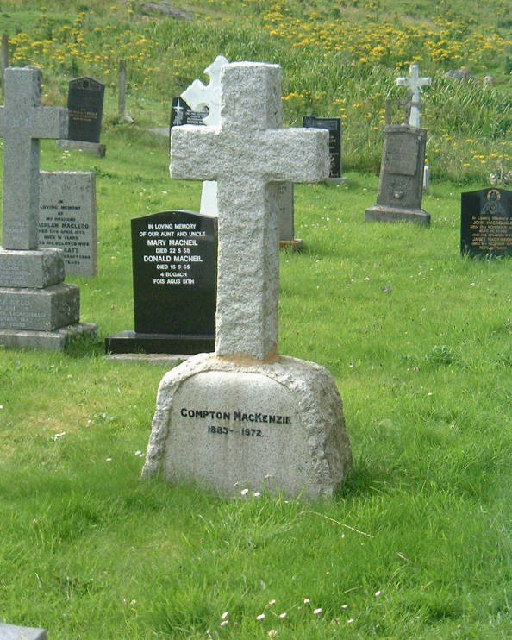
Grave of Compton Mackenzie, Eoligarry, Isle of Barra, Outer Hebrides

Mackenzie went to great lengths to trace the steps of his ancestors back to his spiritual home in the Highlands, and displayed a deep and tenacious attachment to Gaelic culture throughout his long and very colourful life. As his biographer, Andro Linklater, commented: "Mackenzie wasn't born a Scot, and he didn't sound like a Scot. But nevertheless his imagination was truly Scottish". He was an ardent Jacobite, the third Governor-General of the Royal Stuart Society, and a co-founder of the National Party of Scotland. He became a member of the Scottish Arts Club in 1929. He was rector of University of Glasgow from 1931 to 1934, defeating Oswald Mosley, who later led the British Union of Fascists, in his bid for the job.

From 1920 to 1923, Mackenzie was the Tenant of Herm and Jethou. He built a house on Barra, in the Western Isles (Outer Hebrides) of Scotland, in the 1930s. On Barra, he gained inspiration and found creative solitude, and befriended a great number of people that he described as "the aristocrats of democracy".

He was a founding member of the short-lived secret organisation Clann Albain.

== Private life ==
Mackenzie was married three times. On 30 November 1905 (aged 22), he married Faith Stone in St Saviour's, Pimlico; they remained married for more than 50 years, until her death. In 1962 (aged 79), he married Christina MacSween, who died the following year. Lastly, he married his deceased wife's sister, Lilian MacSween, in 1965 (aged 82).

Mackenzie was a supporter of West Bromwich Albion. Although from the north-east of England, he "was influenced in the choice of Albion as 'my' team by the fact that their ground was romantically called The Hawthorns and that they were nicknamed the Throstles".

He was also a fan of snooker, and gave an account of the origin of the game's name in The Billiard Player magazine of 1939, describing how a young lieutenant named Neville Chamberlain (not the former British Prime Minister) had been experimenting on the officers' mess table with the existing game of "Black Pool" featuring 15 red balls and a black. He presented the World Championship trophy to Joe Davis at the 1939 Championship.

After his retirement, Mackenzie sold the entire copyright in 20 of his books for a lump sum of £10,000 arguing that this was a capital receipt and not the proceeds of the business. The Court of Appeal held that this was assessable income as part of the proceeds of his business: Mackenzie v Arnold (1952) 33 TC 363.

In 1964, Mackenzie joined the Who Killed Kennedy? Committee set up by Bertrand Russell.

Mackenzie died on 30 November 1972, aged 89, in Edinburgh and was interred in St Barr's churchyard cemetery at Eoligarry on the Isle of Barra.

== Select bibliography ==
A list based on Kenneth Young's Compton Mackenzie, 1968:

=== Verse ===
- Poems (1907)
- Kensington Rhymes (1912)

=== Plays ===
- The Gentleman in Grey (1907)
- Columbine (1920)
- The Lost Cause (1931)

=== Novels and romances ===
- The Passionate Elopement (1911), a revision of the play The Gentleman in Grey
- Carnival (1912), an early best-seller, filmed as The Ballet Girl (1916), Dance Pretty Lady (1932) and Carnival (1946)
- Sinister Street (1914), 2 volumes, a Bildungsroman
- Guy and Pauline (1915), a sequel to Sinister Street, also published as Plashers Mead
- The Early Life and Adventures of Sylvia Scarlett (1918), a sequel to Sinister Street, filmed in 1935 as Sylvia Scarlett
- Sylvia and Michael (1919), a sequel to Sylvia Scarlett
- Poor Relations (1919)
- The Vanity Girl (1920)
- Rich Relatives (1921)
- The Altar Steps (1922)
- The Seven Ages of Woman (1923)
- The Parson's Progress (1923), a sequel to The Altar Steps
- The Heavenly Ladder (1924), a sequel to The Parson's Progress
- The Old Men of the Sea (1924)
- Coral (1925), a sequel to Carnival
- Fairy Gold (1926)
- Rogues and Vagabonds (1927)
- Vestal Fire (1927)
- Extraordinary Women (1928)
- Extremes Meet (1928)
- The Three Couriers (1929)
- April Fools (1930), a sequel to Poor Relations
- Buttercups and Daisies (1931)
- Our Street (1931)
- Water on the Brain (1933), an absurdist spy novel parody
- The Darkening Green (1934)
- Figure of Eight (1936)
- The Four Winds of Love (6 volumes 1937–45)
- The Red Tapeworm (1941)
- The Monarch of the Glen (1941)
- Keep the Home Guard Turning (1943)
- Whisky Galore (1947), filmed in 1948 as Whisky Galore!
- Hunting the Fairies (1949)
- The Rival Monster (1952)
- Ben Nevis Goes East (1954)
- Thin Ice (1956)
- Rockets Galore (1957), a sequel, filmed in 1958 as Rockets Galore!
- The Lunatic Republic (1959)
- Mezzotint (1961)
- The Stolen Soprano (1965)
- Paper Lives (1966), a sequel to The Red Tapeworm

=== History and biography ===
- Gallipoli Memories (1929)
- First Athenian Memories (1931)
- Greek Memories (1932), a continuation of First Athenian Memories
- Prince Charlie (1932), biography
- Marathon and Salamis (1934), history
- Prince Charlie and His Ladies (1934), history
- Catholicism and Scotland (1934), history
- The Book of Barra (1936) (with J.L. Campbell)
- Pericles (1937), history
- The Windsor Tapestry. Being a study of the life, heritage and abdication of HRH The Duke of Windsor (1938)
- Aegean Memories (1940)
- Calvary (with F.C. Mackenzie) (1942)
- Wind of Freedom: The history of the invasion of Greece by the Axis powers, 1940–1941 (1943)
- Mr Roosevelt (1943), biography
- Brockhouse (1944), history
- Dr Benes (1946), biography
- The Vital Flame (1946) (on the gas industry)
- All over the Place (1949), diary
- Eastern Epic, an account of the part played by the Indian Army in the Second World War, Vol. I (1951)
- I Took a Journey ... A tour of the National Trust Properties (1951)
- The House of Coalport 1750–1950 (1951), history
- The Queen's House. A history of Buckingham Palace (1953), history
- Realms of Silver. One Hundred Years of Banking in the East (1954), a history of the Chartered Bank of India, Australia and China
- The Savoy of London (1953), history
- My Record of Music (1955), musical autobiography
- Sublime Tobacco (1957)
- Cats' Company (1960), with photos by Harrison Marks
- Greece in My Life (1960), essays
- Catmint (1961), imaginary conversations
- Look at Cats (1964)
- Little Cat Lost (1965)

=== Essays and criticism ===
- Gramophone Nights (1923), (with Archibald Marshall)
- Unconsidered Trifles (1932), collected essays
- Literature in My Time (1933), criticism
- Reaped and Bound (1933), collected essays
- A Musical Chair (1939), essays
- Echoes (1954), broadcast talks
- On Moral Courage (1962)

=== Children's stories ===
- Santa Claus in Summer (1924)
- Told (1930), tales and verses
- Little Cat Lost (1965)
- The Stairs That Kept Going Down (1967)
- The Strongest Man on Earth (1967), mythology for young people

=== Autobiography ===
- My Life and Times in ten "Octave" volumes each intended to cover eight years, published as:
- Octave One (1883–1891)
- Octave Two (1891–1900)
- Octave Three (1900–1907)
- Octave Four (1907–1915)
- Octave Five (1915–1923)
- Octave Six (1923–1930)
- Octave Seven (1931–1938)
- Octave Eight (1939–1946)
- Octave Nine (1946–1953)
- Octave Ten (1953–1963)

== Biographies ==
- Linklater, Andro. Compton Mackenzie: A Life (The Hogarth Press, 1992)
- Mackenzie, Lady Faith Compton. More Than I Should (Collins, 1940)

== Filmography ==
Year	Title	Role	Notes
1949	Whisky Galore!	Captain Buncher	Film debut
1950	Chance of a Lifetime	Sir Robert Dysart	Final film
1966	Jackanory	Storyteller	

Academic offices
Preceded by Stanley Baldwin	Rector of the University of Glasgow; 1931—1934	Succeeded by Iain Colquhoun
