= MOD Hebrides =

Military base in Scotland, UK

- South Uist Missile Range, Hebrides Range
- Scotland
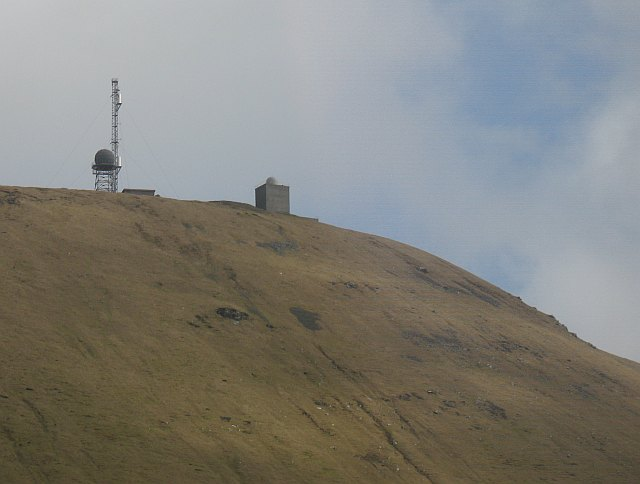
- Radar installation for missile tracking at Mullach Mòr on Hirta, part of St Kilda, in April 2009

Site information
- Type: Missile Range
- Owner: Qinetiq
- Operator: Qinetiq
- Controlled by: Royal Air Force

Location
- Location of MOD Hebrides on Benbecula Location of MOD Hebrides within the Outer Hebrides MOD Hebrides (the United Kingdom)
- Coordinates: 57°28′15.77″N 7°22′36.89″W

Site history
- Built: 1957
- Built by: RAF 5004 Airfield Construction Squadron

Garrison information
- Garrison: Congreve House

Airfield information
- Elevation: 2 metres (6 ft 7 in) AMSL

MOD Hebrides is a Ministry of Defence site in the Outer Hebrides, Scotland, operated by QinetiQ. It consists of a deep sea range for complex weapons trials and an inner range for ground-based air defence test and evaluation. It has also been known as the Hebrides Guided Weapon Range and the South Uist Missile Range.

== History ==
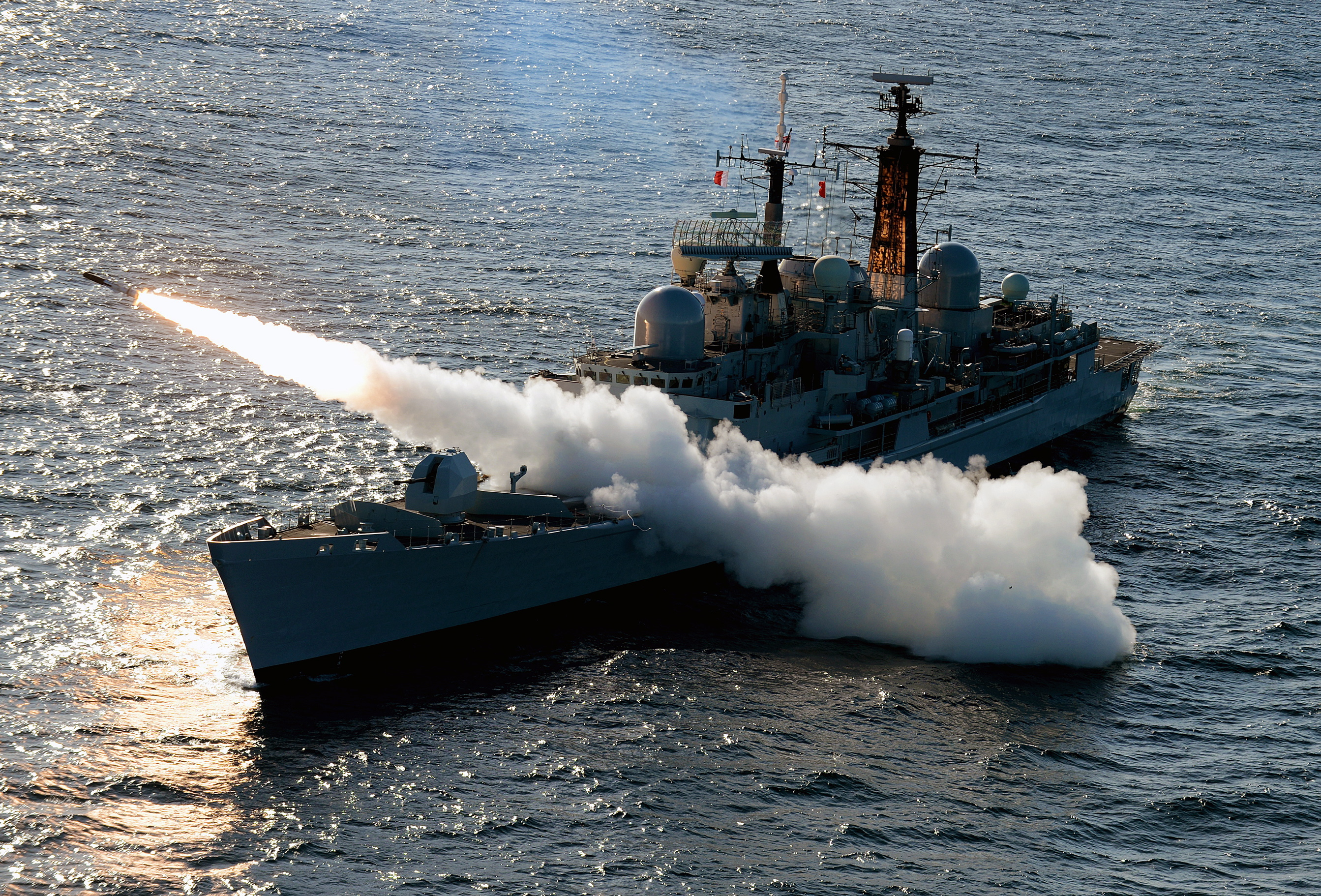
HMS Edinburgh firing a Sea Dart on the range in April 2012

In the north west of South Uist at (57°20′N 07°20′W), a missile testing range was built in 1957–58 by the Ministry of Defence to launch the MGM-5 Corporal missile, Britain and America's first guided nuclear weapon. This development went ahead despite significant protests, some locals expressing concern that the Scottish Gaelic language would not survive the influx of English-speaking Army personnel to South Uist. Opposition to the construction of the range resulted in the novel Rockets Galore, by Sir Compton Mackenzie, which was made into the film Rockets Galore!. Resistance to the building of the range also led to the construction of the religious monument Our Lady of the Isles. The UK Government claimed that there was an 'overriding national interest' in establishing a training range for their newly purchased Corporal, a weapon that was to be at the front line of Cold War defence. Missiles were fired toward designated target coordinates in the Atlantic Ocean. Radar on Hirta (the main island of the St Kilda archipelago) identified missile landing points. Soviet spy ship 'fishing trawlers' would intrude into the target area and the UK adoption of the Corporal resulted in the islet of Rockall being incorporated into the United Kingdom in 1955, to prevent its use by Soviet observers. The Corporal missile was tested from 1959 to 1963, before giving way to MGM-29 Sergeant and MGM-52 Lance tactical nuclear missiles. The 'rocket range' as it is known locally has also been used to test high-altitude research rockets, Skua and Petrel.

The range was operated by the Defence Evaluation and Research Agency (DERA), for evaluating new missiles. MOD Hebrides is still owned by the MoD and is operated by QinetiQ as a testing facility for missile systems such as the surface-to-air Rapier missile and unmanned aerial vehicles. In 2016, it was announced that £180 million was to be invested in the modernisation of the facilities across MOD Hebrides, plus a site in Wales and another in England.

In 2023, Exercise Formidable Shield, designed to test the ballistic missile defence capabilities of NATO and its partner nations, took place at MOD Hebrides Range. A total of more than 4,000 personnel from 13 nations, 20 ships, 35 aircraft, including the Eurofighter Typhoon and F-35 Lightning II, and eight ground units, including radar platforms and the US M142 High Mobility Artillery Rocket System (HIMARS), took part in the biennial exercise.

In 2024, the DragonFire laser directed-energy weapon (LDEW) was fired during trials at the MOD Hebrides range.

== Structure ==
It is situated in the Outer Hebrides on South Uist and Hirta in the St Kilda archipelago. The now uninhabited St Kilda became Scotland's first World Heritage Site in 1987 and is one of the few in the world to hold joint status for both its ecological and cultural significance. The range occupies 115,000 km^{2} of sanitised airspace with unlimited altitude. The missiles are tracked from St Kilda which is now leased by the Ministry of Defence. The site is run by QinetiQ, a privatised former division of the MoD.

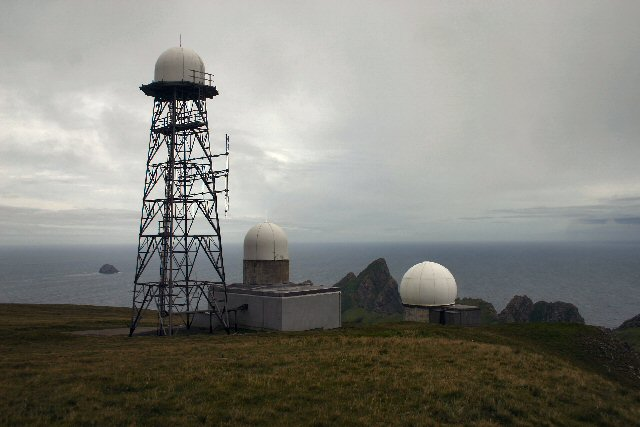
Tracking station on St Kilda in August 2006

The facilities include:

- Tracking Radar Facility: Real-time data for trials control and safety purposes, as well as providing recordings of time, space and position information for post-trial trajectory analysis, using G Band Radar and Nike Digital Instrumentation Radar (NiDIR).
- Telemetry: Receive, record and monitor video and other data streams.
- Support Services: Mechanical and engineering services, accommodation, recreation and medical facilities.
- Surface Target Facility
- Aerial Target Facility.

== See also ==
- List of rocket launch sites
- 1957 in Scotland
- BUTEC (British Underwater Test and Evaluation Centre) at Raasay
- Luce Bay in Dumfries and Galloway
- RAF Tain on the Moray Firth
