= Whisky Galore =

Whisky Galore may refer to:

- Whisky Galore (novel), a 1947 novel written by Compton Mackenzie
- Whisky Galore! (1949 film), an Ealing comedy based on the novel
- Whisky Galore! (2016 film), a remake of the 1949 film
