= SS Politician =

Cargo ship that operated between 1923 and 1941

Coordinates: 57°5′52″N 7°15′43″W

- SS Politician

History
- Name: London Merchant (1923–1935); Politician (1935–1941)
- Owner: Furness, Withy and Co. (1923–1935); T & J Harrison (1935–1941)
- Builder: Furness Shipbuilding Company
- Laid down: 19 September 1920
- Launched: 15 November 1921
- Completed: May 1923
- Fate: Grounded 1941

General characteristics
- Type: Cargo ship
- Tonnage: 7,899 (GRT)
- Length: 450 ft 6 in (137.31 m)
- Beam: 58 ft (17.7 m)
- Installed power: steam turbine
- Speed: 14 knots (26 km/h; 16 mph)

SS Politician was a cargo ship that ran aground off the coast of the Hebridean island of Eriskay in 1941. Her cargo included 22,000 cases of scotch whisky and £3 million worth of Jamaican banknotes. Much of the whisky was recovered by islanders from across the Hebrides, contrary to marine salvage laws. Because no duty had been paid on the whisky, members of HM Customs and Excise pursued and prosecuted those who had removed the cargo.

Politician was completed in 1923 under the name London Merchant. She was a general cargo ship that traded between Britain, the United States and Canada, and up and down the west coast of the US. In 1924—during the years of American prohibition—Oregon's state prohibition commissioner seized her cargo of whisky despite its having been approved and sealed by US federal authorities. After the British Embassy in Washington complained to the US government, the whisky was released back to the ship. During the Second World War Politician participated in the Atlantic convoys between the UK and US. In February 1941 she was on her way to the north of Scotland, where she ran aground while attempting to rendezvous with a convoy. No-one was badly injured or killed in the accident.

The local islanders continually visited the wreck of Politician to unload whisky, even though it was in a hold filled with marine engine oil and seawater. Customs men undertook raids, arresting many and seizing the boats of those suspected of taking part. The excise authorities pushed for charges under the punitive customs legislation, but the authorities charged those arrested with theft. Many were found not guilty or not proven, and several were fined; 19 were incarcerated at Inverness Prison for terms ranging between 20 days and two months. Salvors were used to rescue as much of the ship as they could, and the whisky they raised was shipped back to its bonded warehouses; this was also looted during its journey. Two salvage crews removed much of the cargo, and the second crew raised the wreck off the seabed. Part of the ship's hold, and her stern, were cut away and sank to the bottom of Eriskay Sound; the remainder of the hold was destroyed with gelignite to prevent further looting.

A few of the Jamaican banknotes from Politician were presented at banks in Britain, Jamaica and other countries. As a result, in 1952 the blue ten-shilling notes were withdrawn and replaced with notes of the same design, printed in purple. Bottles of whisky have been raised from the seabed by divers, and some have been found in hiding places on Eriskay; these have been auctioned. The story of the wreck and looting was the basis for the book Whisky Galore; an adaptation was released as a film in 1949 and a remake in 2016.

== 1920–1939 ==
Eriskay's location

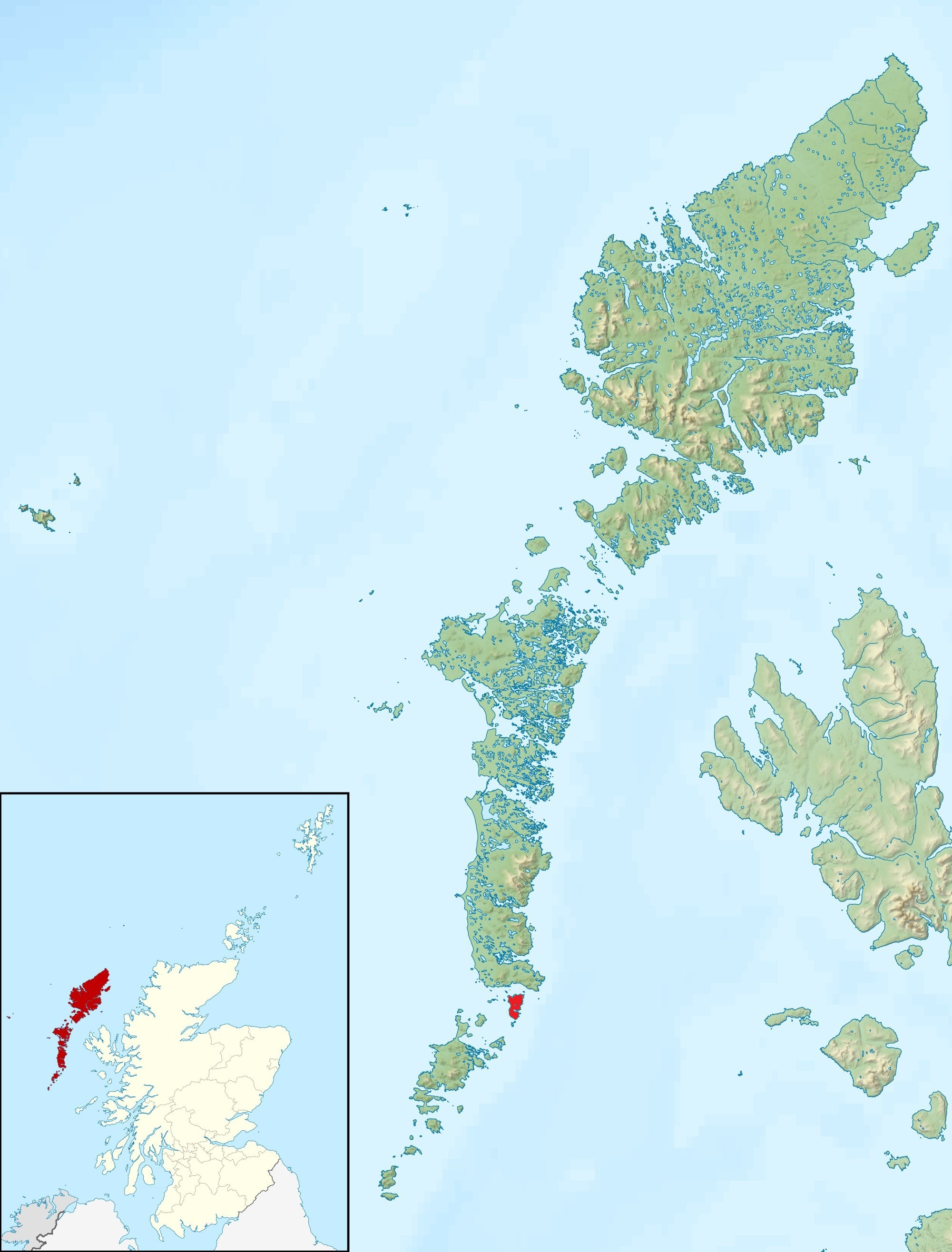
Eriskay's position in the Outer Hebrides

Eriskay, South Uist and Barra

The cargo ship SS Politician was built by the Furness Shipbuilding Company between 19 September 1920—when she was laid down—and 1923 at the Haverton Hill shipyard, County Durham, England. She was launched in November 1921 as SS London Merchant, and was completed in May 1923. London Merchant was one of six sister ships built at the yard; the others were London Commerce, London Importer, London Mariner, London Shipper and Manchester Regiment. (Note: London Merchant's sister ships had mixed fortunes: London Commerce: Renamed Collegian in 1935 and was broken up in 1948.; London Importer: Renamed Reliant and served the Second World War as a supply ship. She was later renamed Firdausa by her Pakistani owners before being scrapped in 1963 in Karachi.; London Mariner: renamed Craftsman, she was destroyed by the German auxiliary cruiser Kormoran in April 1941.; London Shipper: sank in May 1941 after being hit by a German aerial torpedo while travelling between New Orleans and Liverpool.; Manchester Regiment: collided with the SS Oropesa in December 1939 and sank, with the loss of nine lives.) London Merchant's gross registered tonnage was 7,899, she was 450 ft (140 m) long (Note: The length given is the length between perpendiculars measurement.) and 58 ft (17.7 m) at the beam; her depth of hold was 19 ft (5.8 m) and she could achieve 14 knots (26 km/h; 16 mph). While being fitted out, she was hit by another ship and damaged.

After London Merchant was repaired she began trading across the Atlantic; her owners, the Furness Withy company, advertised her cargo services in The Manchester Guardian, shipping from Manchester to Los Angeles, Seattle and Vancouver. In December 1924—during Prohibition in the United States—she docked in Portland, Oregon, with whisky as part of her cargo; this had been approved and sealed by the US federal authorities. George Cleaver, Oregon's state prohibition commissioner, ignored the approval, broke the seal on the cargo and seized the whisky. The ship's master refused to leave without the whisky and the British Embassy in Washington complained to the Federal authorities, who intervened and ordered the whisky released back to the ship. Cleaver was ordered to write an apology to the captain and the Furness Withy company. On Christmas Eve 1927 she was involved in another collision and was repaired. She traded on the US eastern seaboard until 1930 when, with the onset of Great Depression, world trade dropped, and she was tied up in the River Blackwater, Essex, along with 60 other vessels.

In May 1935 London Merchant was purchased by the Charente Steamship Company, part of the T & J Harrison shipping line. Charente renamed her Politician, and used her on cargo routes between Britain and South Africa; her crew soon nicknamed her Polly. At the outbreak of the Second World War Politician came under Admiralty orders and was involved in the Atlantic convoys between the UK and US.

== Early February – 12 March 1941 ==
In early February 1941 SS Politician left the Liverpool docks to travel to the north of Scotland, where she was to assemble with other ships to be convoyed across the Atlantic to the US and Caribbean. Captain Beaconsfield Worthington was the ship's master, overseeing a crew of 51. (Note: Arthur Swinson, in his history of Politician, puts it at 3:05 pm on 3 February—the time written in the ship's log; Roger Hutchinson's history states 9:09 pm the same day; the Merseyside Maritime Museum put the departure on 4 February.) She carried a mixed cargo that included cotton, machetes, sweets, cutlery, bicycles, cigarettes, pineapple chunks and biscuits. In the fifth hold there were eight crates of Jamaican banknotes, comprising ten-shilling and one- and five-pound notes, to the value of £3 million; (Note: £3 million in 1941 equates to approximately £130,940,000 in 2025, according to calculations based on the Consumer Price Index measure of inflation.) alongside the notes were 22,000 cases (264,000 bottles) of Scotch whisky of various brands. (Note: According to Hutchinson the brands shipped included: The Antiquary, Haig Pinch, VVO Gold Bar, Ballantine's Amber Concave, White Horse, King's Ransom, Victoria Vat, Johnnie Walker Red and Black Label, Mountain Dew, King William IV, McCallum's Perfection, King George IV, PD Special, Old Curio and Spey Royal.) (Note: If the whisky had been for sale in Britain it would have retailed at 16 shillings a bottle, giving a total price of £211,000; that equates to approximately £9,209,000 in 2025, according to calculations based on the Consumer Price Index measure of inflation.) The whisky had been taken from bonded warehouses in Leith and Glasgow that had been damaged by German bombing, and was being shipped to the US to raise hard currency for the war effort; as an export product, none of the bottles bore an excise stamp.

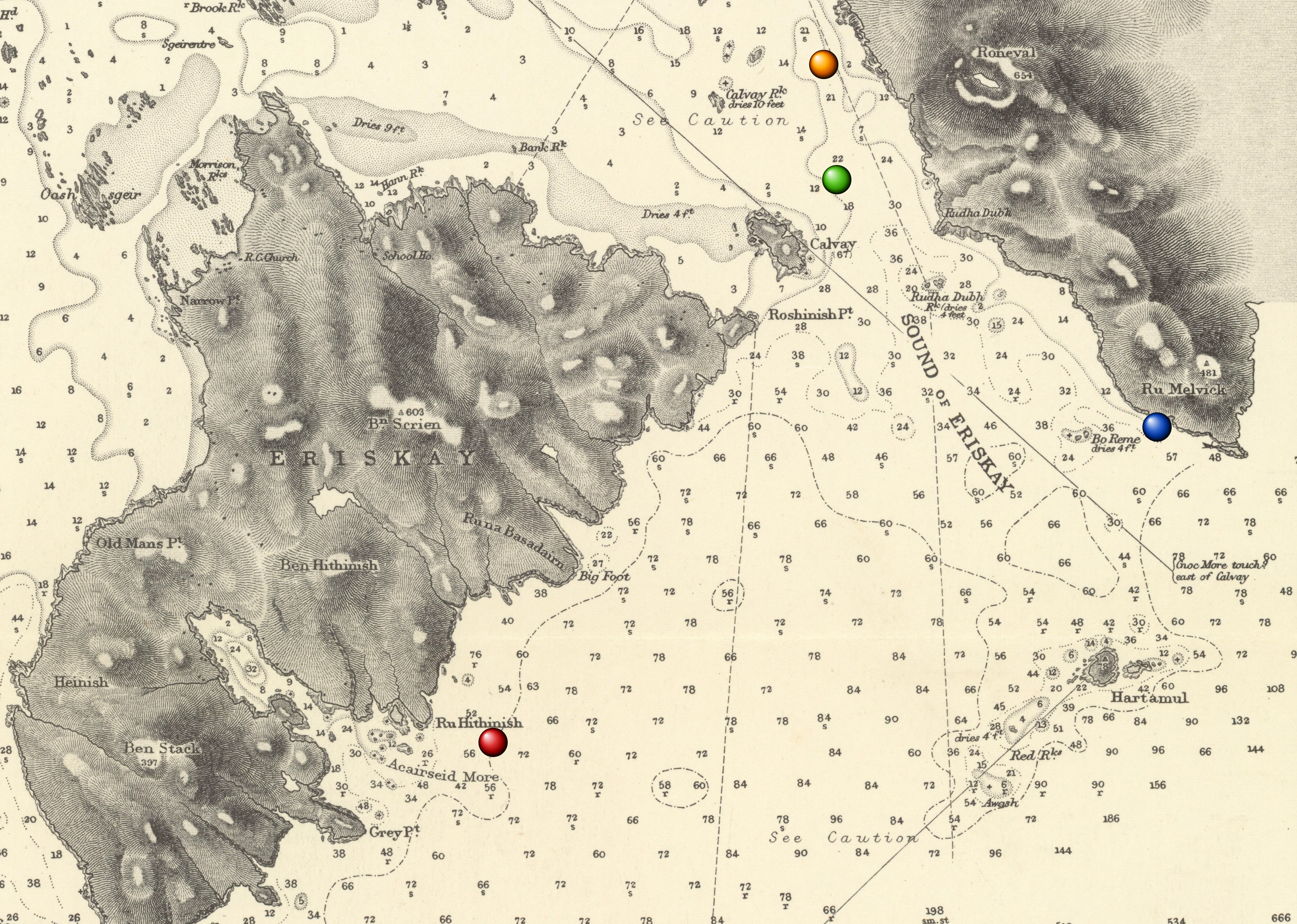
Relevant locations for the SS Politician: – The current site of wreck. And, the approximate site the ship grounded, according to: – the Canmore database; – Roger Hutchinson's history; – Arthur Swinson's history.

After leaving the River Mersey, Politician travelled through the Irish Sea, made her way past the Isle of Man, through the North Channel that separates Britain and Ireland, past Islay then to the west of the Skerryvore lighthouse and into the Sea of the Hebrides. In the vicinity of Eriskay, Politician ran aground on rocks at about 7:40 am on 4 February in bad weather and poor visibility. Sources differ on where Politician was grounded. The Canmore database run by the Historic Environment Scotland puts the event half way along the eastern cost of Eriskay; Roger Hutchinson's book on the story of the ship states it was on the rocks of Ru Melvick, a rock outcrop at the southernmost point of South Uist; the Merseyside Maritime Museum considers it was on "submerged rocks on the northern side of the island of Eriskay"; and Arthur Swinson's 1963 history places it just north of Calvay, a small uninhabited island at the north end of Eriskay. Eriskay is 703 hectares (1,740 acres); the population recorded on the island in the 1931 census was 420.

Worthington attempted to free Politician from the rocks, but she would not move. The rocks had breached the hull and water began to flood the engine room and stokehold and break the vessel's propeller shaft. Worthington was concerned the heavy waves would soon break up the ship, so he ordered the crew to abandon ship. The radio operator sent two SOS messages; the first was "Abandoning ship. Making Water. Engine-room flooded"; the second, sent at 8:22 am stated the vessel was positioned "ashore south of Barra island, pounding heavily". (Note: The message was also picked up by radio monitoring in Germany; William Joyce, the Nazi propagandist who broadcast as Lord Haw-Haw, announced the sinking of Politician with the loss of all hands in his next morning bulletin, broadcast into Britain.) One lifeboat was launched with 26 men on board. It was washed onto rocks close inshore to Rudha Dubh, an outcrop on South Uist. All survived, although one man was injured on the rocks. Lloyd's, the lifeboat from Barra, spent several hours searching the area south of the island in heavy mist before a report came in of Politician's siren, which had been heard north of Eriskay. Lloyd's travelled to the area, by which time fishermen from Eriskay had boarded Politician. At Worthington's request they sailed to Rudha Dubh, collected those who had left earlier, and returned to the ship. The lifeboat reached Politician at about 4:00 pm, when Politician's crew boarded the lifeboat and were taken to Eriskay. They spent the night there, billeted in small groups in the homes of the islanders; while staying on the island, the sailors told the islanders that Politician's cargo contained whisky.

The following morning, 6 February, Worthington and his first mate, R. A. Swaine, were taken back to Politician to view the damage and see if there was any chance of salvaging her. He found that someone had been on board overnight, as personal possessions of the crew had been taken. The vessel was in the same situation as the previous day, so they signalled the situation to T&J Harrison. Harrison's asked the Liverpool & Glasgow Salvage Association to assess Politician's status. The chief salvage officer, Commander Kay, arrived at the stricken vessel on 8 February, and reported back that a salvage attempt was possible. (Note: The same day Kay arrived, another cargo ship, SS Thala, hit a rock and sank at Hartamul, a small outcrop to the east of Eriskay.) The signal stated that there was 5 feet (1.5 m) of water in the main hold, 23 feet (10 m) in the engine room and 11 feet (3.4 m) in number five hold. Within days the salvage ship Ranger had arrived and 500 long tons (510 t) of cargo were removed. (Note: Hutchinson gives the day of arrival as 9 February; Swinson gives it as 11 February.) As hold five was below the surface, and full of a mixture of seawater and oil, Kay did not attempt to salvage its contents.

Local customs officers considered that some whisky had already made its way onto the islands, and asked Kay to put a guard on the ship at night-time. He refused, pointing out that with the rough seas it was dangerous for the man left behind, and it would be a waste of his time. There was evidence that islanders had been aboard during the nights: the crew's bonded stores—the food, drink and tobacco for consumption during the voyage—were all looted on 19 February. Some of Kay's salvors had managed to obtain whisky from the hold. When they returned to Glasgow on one trip, a search by customs men found several bottles, which they seized. On their second trip, the salvors dropped the whisky before entering port and had it picked up later. On 10 March representatives of HM Customs and Excise secured the hold with an excise seal to show no duty had been paid on the contents. On 12 March 1941 Kay and the salvage crew left the wreck of Politician.

== 12 March – early April 1941 ==
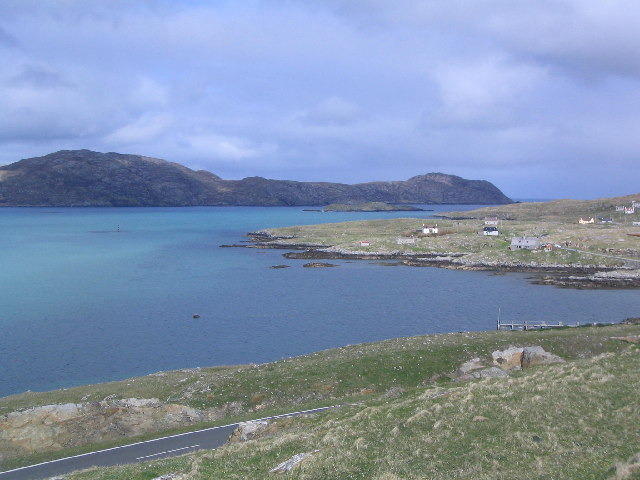
View of South Uist from Eriskay; the small island of Calvay lies in the middle of the sound.

In 1941 all wrecks came under the protection of the Merchant Shipping Act 1894. (Note: The Merchant Shipping Act 1894 was repealed in 1996 by the Merchant Shipping Act 1995.) Part IX, paragraph 536 of the Act covered "Interfering with wrecked vessel or wreck", and stated that:

1.) A person shall not without the leave of the master board any vessel which is wrecked, stranded, or in distress ...

2.) A person shall not: ...

(c) wrongfully carry away or remove any part of a vessel stranded or in danger of being stranded, or otherwise in distress, on or near any coast or tidal water, or any part of the cargo or apparel thereof, or any wreck.

The islanders took a different view of salvage and considered that they did not "steal" any cargo from local wrecks, but instead talked of "saving" or "rescuing" it from the sea. They knew Politician had been abandoned by the owners and the salvage crews; one islander later told Swinson "when the salvors quit a ship—she's ours". Once the salvage crew had left the Politician, islanders from across the Hebrides, as well as boats from Scotland's west coast, engaged in what Hutchinson calls the "wholesale rescuing" of the whisky. They were aided in navigating round the wreck by Angus John Campbell, a local man who had served as boatswain on Politician between the wars. Wartime rationing had led to shortages of the spirit, and what supplies were made available were increasingly expensive because of rising duty. (Note: An average cost for a bottle of scotch was 16 shillings; the tax and duty to be paid on per bottle was 11s 4d.) For several nights, the islanders worked on hooking the crates out of the oil-and-seawater-filled hold; every night between 20 and 50 men were on the wreck working to remove the whisky. As the contents being raised were covered in oil, the men's clothes were soon covered, and many began to use their wives' dresses to cover their own clothes.

Some of the men made only a few trips to Politician to get what they wanted—Campbell obtained 300 cases; others picked up between 20 and 80 cases a night, and one man with a larger boat is thought to have recovered more than 1,000 cases. When the men returned to their respective islands each night, they hid their spoils in a variety of places, in case the Excise men raided. Rabbit holes, piles of peat and creels placed under the sea and behind panels in homes were all used. Burying caches of whisky was also popular, but brought about a second problem; islanders who had not visited the wreck would watch where it was buried and dig it up as soon as the men left the burial site. One man put 46 cases in a small cave on an island off Barra as a reserve for when he ran out; when he returned only four were left.

News of the islanders' removal of whisky from Politician was known early on. The local Customs and Excise officer, Charles McColl, commandeered a local boat on 15 March and, with the aid of Donald MacKenzie, a local constable, went out into Eriskay Sound—the stretch of water between Eriskay and South Uist—and intercepted two boats laden with cases of whisky. On landing, McColl walked along the coast and intercepted a third boat unloading whisky. The details of 18 men were taken down from the day's efforts. Two days later McColl and MacKenzie conducted searches of the crofts of those they had intercepted and seized thousands of items from Politician, but no whisky. Surmising that the whisky had been well hidden, he expanded his search and, on his own, searched other local crofts, but still found no whisky. His initial searches lasted until 22 March, when he thought the sea was too rough for the looters to visit the wreck, although they still did.

McColl never visited the wreck at night time. When the weather cleared on 5 April, he tried to commandeer the boat again but it was unavailable. Instead he patrolled the coast of South Uist and apprehended one boat when it landed. He began searching the crofts of South Uist, but the residents had learned of his raids on Eriskay, and hidden their bounty carefully; there were stories of the police who assisted in the searches turning a blind eye where they could. No seizures were made on Barra, but local police heard of large-scale selling of the whisky on the island and arrested four men, whom they charged with theft.

== Early April – August 1941 ==
The second official salvage crew removing some of the cases of whisky

On 9 April a second salvage boat arrived at Eriskay. While Kay and the Liverpool & Glasgow Salvage Association had been retained to salvage what they could, the scrap metal was of no concern to them. The second salvage company was British Iron & Steel Corporation (Salvage) Ltd (BISC). Their remit was to check Kay's conclusion about the inability to refloat Politician. If it could not be refloated, then it was planned to tow part of the superstructure to be reused. If that was still not possible, stripping the vessel of as much metal as possible was sometimes financially viable. The wreck of Thalia was nearby and known to contain iron ore, which made the salvage more lucrative for them.

After two visits to Politician in early April, BISC considered that it was possible that the wreck could be refloated. McColl had visited the ship with the salvors, and was angered by that state of the vessel, which showed signs of having been extensively looted. He wrote to Ivan Gledhill—the local Customs surveyor and his direct superior—and told him "I should imagine that 300 cases have gone out of her. That, I believe, is a conservative estimate." He also told Gledhill that he intended to step up his search efforts, and ensure that as many of the malefactors from Eriskay and South Uist were sent to prison for as long as possible. Gledhill agreed with the strategy. He accompanied McColl as often as he could, although his territory was too large and his workload proportionally higher, so the visits were not as frequent as he would have liked.

With the arrival of Captain Edward Lauretson and the salvage ship Assistance, BISC returned to Politician on 21 April. The salvage operation they conducted took several months, and involved divers descending into hold five to clear out the cargo. They removed 13,500 cases and three casks of whisky from the wreck, as well as stout and sherry. Several eyewitnesses later said the salvors helped themselves to whisky whenever they wanted, and would often return to their billets on Eriskay and South Uist with bottles to share with the islanders. A report from the salvors to the Salvage Association passed information that some of the Jamaican banknotes had been seen on Benbecula—25 miles (40 km) from Politician. The organisation that provided the administration of British Crown colonies for the government, which included providing banknotes, was the Crown Agents; it was they who had arranged for the printing of the money by De La Rue, and who organised its shipping to the Caribbean. On hearing the news of the loss of the money, the Crown Agents thought that:

The local police service is no doubt on a very small scale but the nature of the place and its surroundings should tend to reduce the chances of serious loss through the notes being presented and paid.

The Jamaica banknotes carried by Politician
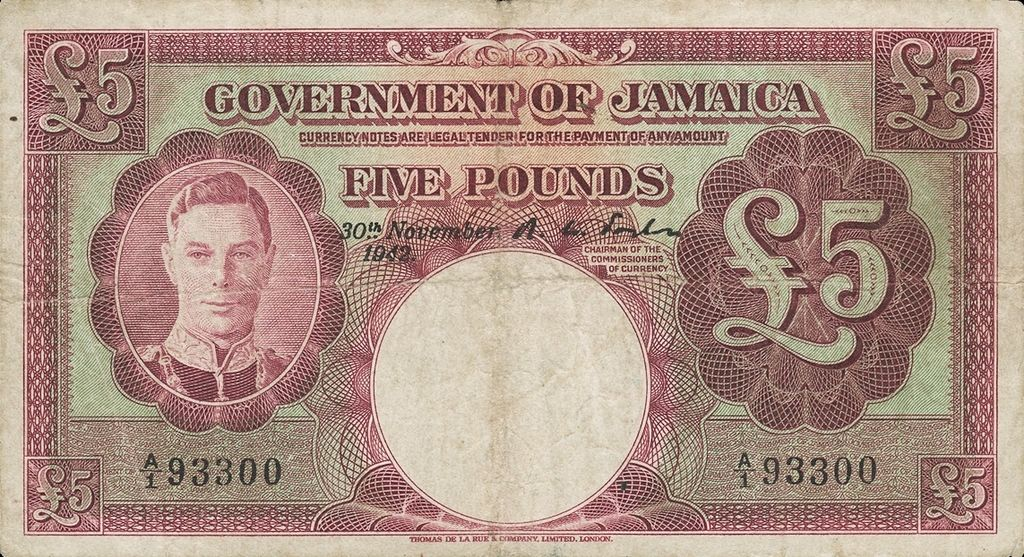
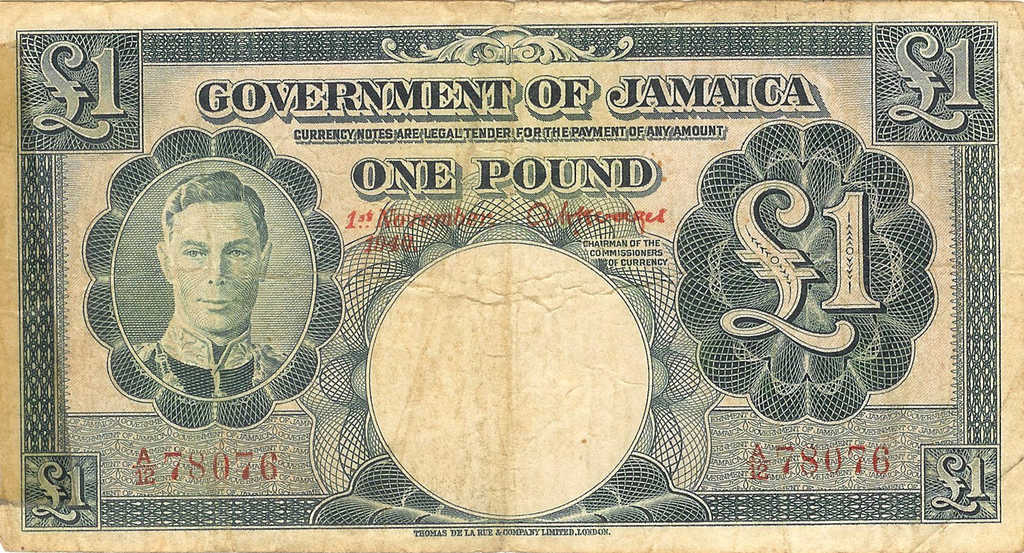
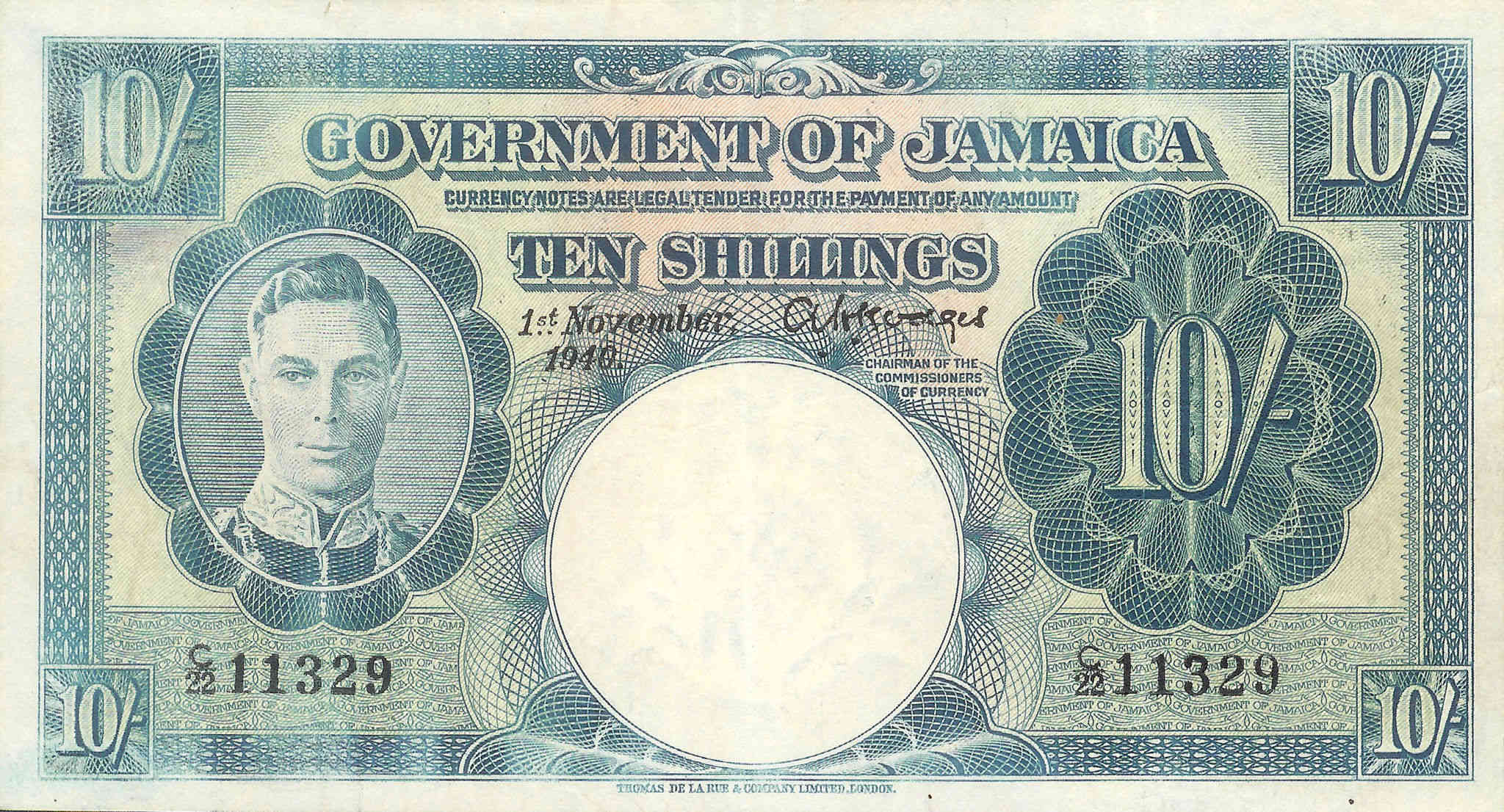
- Dark blue coloured banknote showing image of George VI

Children on the islands were found playing with the notes, and within two months water-stained Jamaican notes were being exchanged in banks in Liverpool.

The first court cases took place at Lochmaddy Sheriff Court on 26 April; they involved four men arrested on Barra three days earlier when the police saw them unloading whisky and barrels of oil. Three of the men were fined £3 each; the other two had to pay £5. (Note: £3 in 1941 equates to approximately £131 in 2025; £5 from 1941 equates to approximately £218 in the same period, according to calculations based on the Consumer Price Index measure of inflation.) McColl and Gledhill applied pressure on the legal authorities, directly and through their superiors. McColl argued that the looters should be tried under the terms of the specialist Customs Consolidation Act 1876 or the Merchant Shipping Act 1894, both of which carried more punitive punishments than ordinary legislation for theft. McColl and Gledhill wrote reports to their superiors that accused the looters of vandalism on Politician and widescale black-marketeering of the stolen whisky, and claimed the local police were being bribed to ignore the situation. The journalists Adrian Turpin and Peter Day write that the outrage of the customs men should be taken "with a pinch of salt"; the organisation was in the midst of providing evidence for later prosecutions and was not neutral.

McColl continued with his attempts to find the whisky. On 5 June he and Gledhill persuaded Edward Bootham White, the Customs officer based on Harris, to assist them; they were also provided with two police sergeants from the mainland to assist them. On 6 and 7 June they conducted intensive searches of crofts and farms on Eriskay and Uist. Hutchinson relates that the searches destroyed peat stacks, forced entry into people's homes and disrupted the innocent and guilty alike, "an unnecessary, disproportionately harsh harassment". Sources differ over the success of the raids: Swinson quotes Gledhill, who states that "wherever we went, we got tons of the stuff ... [At Lochboisdale, South Uist], it filled the cells, the police garage and the policeman's house. A lot of it had to be stacked outside". Hutchinson writes that the raids were "spectacularly unsuccessful", only two cases of whisky being found. Hutchinson also quotes Gledhill, who says "The ineffective result was due to the fact that on the first day the local inspector of police refused to continue the search after lunchtime". The police did not work on the Sunday (the 8th), and those on Eriskay spent the day hiding or moving goods to better locations, waiting for a resumption of the raids the following week. A storm blew up on Monday 9, so the mail boat could not carry McColl and his colleagues across, and by Tuesday the policemen had returned to the mainland to resume their normal duties.

Between 10 and 13 June the trials took place of 32 men arrested for the theft from Politician. McColl gave evidence and stated that the men had stolen whisky from a vessel that was still seaworthy; the sheriff-substitute hearing the case accepted McColl's statement. One man was found not guilty, nine others were not proven—the Scottish legal verdict to acquit an individual but not declare them innocent—three were fined and 19 were incarcerated at Inverness Prison for terms ranging between 20 days and two months. McColl still thought the sentences were too lenient, and wrote to the interim procurator fiscal to complain; he also wrote to the Customs commissioners and said:

In my opinion these few small sentences are quite inadequate to act as a general detriment to the population of these islands, who in my opinion will probably seize their next opportunity to further looting and damage.

The night the prison sentences were handed down, a hole was made in the roof of the shared garage where McColl's car was parked; paraffin was poured in and set alight. McColl's car was only damaged in the event, but another was destroyed. According to the Customs men, they were subjected to threats of violence throughout their investigation; Bootham White reported to the commissioners in London that McColl should not be active in any further searches because of "threats and warning of bodily injury".

On some of the raids by Gledhill and McColl, they seized boats that had been identified as being involved in visiting Politician; these were either through reports from informants, or because there was the ship's fuel oil on the boat. Those that were not seized at the time were painted with an arrow for seizure later. By the time the court cases had been heard, the customs men had amassed a considerable number of the vessels. Several islanders wrote to him asking for the boats to be returned, as the lobster fishing season was in progress, and they were unable to work; one man pointed out that his sons had used the boat against his wishes, and as one of the sons was in prison and the other fighting in North Africa, he wanted his boat back; one farmer whose boat had been used by local boys to visit the wreck needed his craft to tend 200 sheep and lambs grazing on a smaller island nearby, and was unable to access it without his vessel. All the requests were turned down by Gledhill, who instructed McColl to continue seizing any craft he thought were involved.

== September 1941 – August 1942 ==
Examples of British customs seals

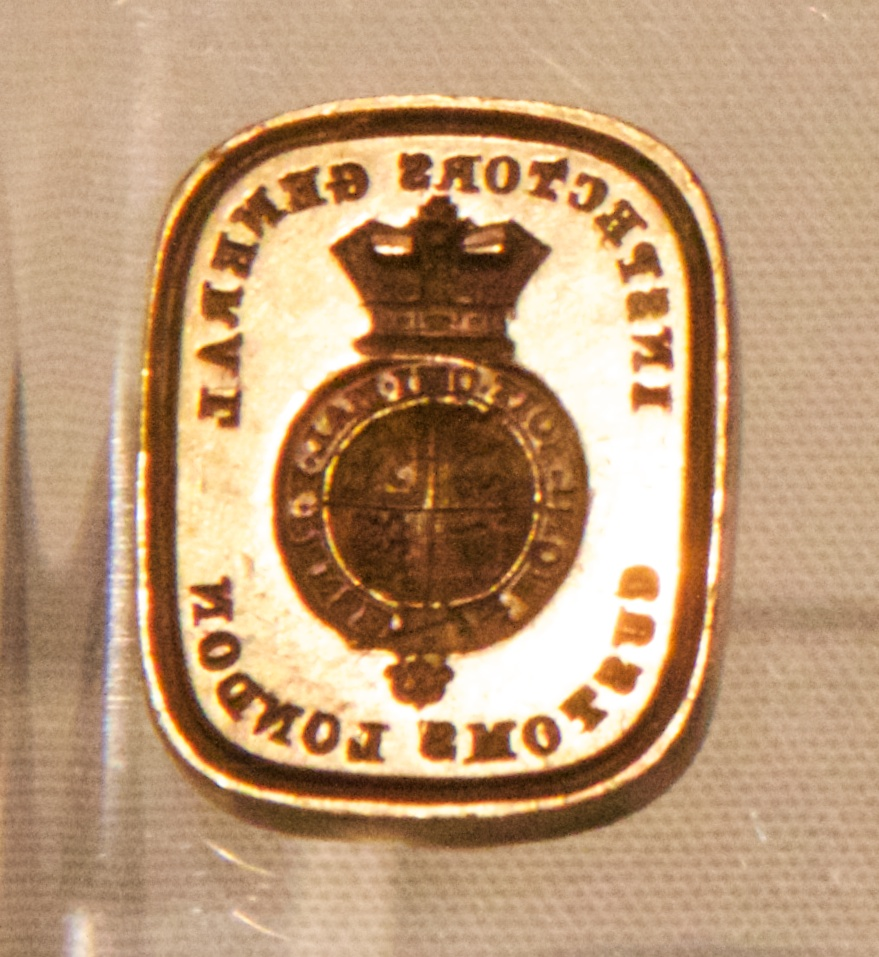
London

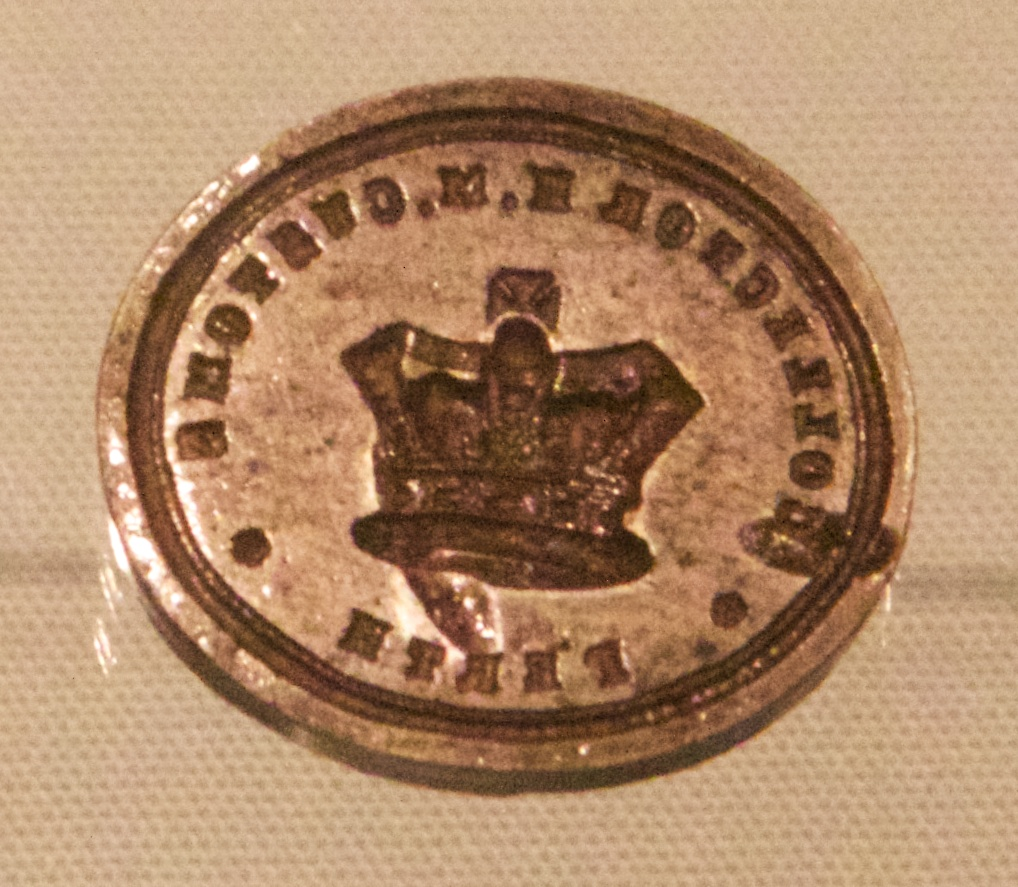
Perth

In September 1941 the whisky that had been salvaged by BISC was shipped to the mainland and put into locked railway carriages which had the excise seal placed on them. By the time the trains reached Kilmarnock on their way to the same bonded warehouses the cargo had left in January 1941, the customs seals had been broken, the doors unlocked and the cargo part looted.

Relations between the police and Customs men became increasingly strained by late 1941, and Gledhill began to criticise the force in his reports back to London. (Note: In one, he complained that during one arrest "The co-operation of the police ... left much to be desired".) He also wrote to William Fraser, the chief constable of Inverness-shire, to complain that customs were not being fully informed of all developments, nor of the total amount of whisky seized. Fraser began to become annoyed with correspondence between himself and Gledhill, and between himself and the customs commissioners in London. One of his ongoing requests was for the removal of the whisky from Lochboisdale police station, where it still occupied considerable space. He made progress only when he threatened to raise the matter with his Secretary of State, and it was agreed to remove it with the whisky that the salvors had raised from the wreck.

Gledhill continued to push for stringent measures to be taken against those still awaiting trial. A permanent procurator fiscal, Donald Macmillan, had replaced his temporary predecessor, and Gledhill wrote to him to try and have the remaining cases heard under customs legislation. Macmillan told him to establish what the customs commissioners wanted, and at the end of October, Gledhill had been told by his superiors not to press for the punitive charges, but to allow charges of theft; he also asked to be kept informed of any further prosecutions involving four crofters who were found with stashes of whisky on their land. Macmillan wrote back that two of the cases had been dismissed by his predecessor and the remaining two defendants had gone to sea. Neither were prosecuted when they returned. The seized boats were eventually returned to their owners, but only after they had purchased them from the customs men.

The BISC salvors spent over four months preparing Politician for refloating. They removed extraneous weight, patched the underwater holes, pumped compressed air into the hold, and waited until the weather conditions and tides were right. On 22 September 1941 they finished preparations and the ship was lifted off the rocks. BISC's site agent, Percy Holden, wanted to tow the ship the seven miles (eleven kilometres) to Lochboisdale, where she could be beached to await the heavy tugs needed to tow her to the docks on the River Clyde, where she could be scrapped. The BISC's superintendent engineer on site refused to allow the towing to take place; he said that if there was bad weather on the route, or the sea was rough, then Politician could sink in deep water and never be recovered. The vessel was then towed to a point 500 yards (460 m) north of Calvay and beached on a sandbank; none of the men knew that the bank covered a rock. Politician settled, and broke her back, although no-one realised it until 25 October, when the heavy tugs came to move her to the mainland. All work on the vessel was halted over the winter months, to allow the poor weather to pass.

The salvage divers had reported that number five hold still contained "one stack of probably about 2,000 cases of spirits and, on the bottom of the hold, a very large accumulation of loose paper, carton cases and loose bottles, both broken and unbroken". McColl was concerned about the possibility of more thefts from the ship and requested permission from his superiors to have the hold demolished by explosives; in his request he lied about the remaining cargo, and stated there were 3,000 to 4,000 cases, and thousands of loose bottles. He was given permission to proceed, and on 6 August, 16 sticks of gelignite were used to destroy number five hold and its contents. Swinson described the act as "the ultimate in stupidity, waste and vandalism, symbolising a mental attitude beyond ... [the islanders'] comprehension". Angus John Campbell commented "Dynamiting whisky. You wouldn't think there'd be men in the world so crazy as that!"

There is no accurate figure for the number of bottles taken. McColl estimated that the islanders had taken about 2,000 cases (24,000 bottles). Swinson estimates 7,000 cases. Swinson bases his estimate on the interviews he made with islanders in the early 1960s; he spoke with men who had taken over 500 cases between them, and they were, Swinson records, only a few of the several hundred who visited the wreck.

Holden returned with his salvage team in March 1942 to cut the stern—including number five hold—from the rest of Politician. Once the waterlogged hold had been removed, the remainder of the ship rose from the sandbank, at which point she was towed to Lochboisdale and then on to Rothesay. Within two weeks the main part of the ship had been turned to scrap; number five hold remained on the floor of Eriskay Sound.

The salvors extracted £360,000 in Jamaican currency from number five hold and passed it to Gledhill. (Note: £360,000 in 1941 equates to approximately £15,712,767 in 2025; £5 from 1941 equates to approximately £218.) He sealed the money in boxes and sent it to the salvage agents via the local post office on South Uist. The notes were handed over to the Bank of England. Many had already been presented at banks for exchange. A Royal Air Force corporal changing Jamaican notes in Rothesay was arrested, but was acquitted after he proved he had recently returned from a posting in Jamaica; in November 1942 the foreman of the salvage operation was questioned by police: he had been giving away the notes as souvenirs. By 1958, 211,267 notes had been located; 2,329 more had been presented at banks in Ireland, Switzerland, Malta, the US and Jamaica, some of which had been paid into the banks by people unaware of the source of the money. About 76,400 banknotes remained lost.

== Legacy ==
The islanders involved in removing the whisky were resentful of those who had provided information to the customs officials. There was also a bad feeling towards those who had sold the whisky they found; when interviewed by Swinson in the 1960s, islanders told him that most of those involved in looting the whisky either drank it, hid it for later, or gave it to friends and families. Opinions varied about those who had taken the hidden whisky caches of others. Some islanders thought it was not theirs to take in the first place, so it did not matter who took it the second time; one man told Swinson "it was all part of the fun". Another man said that he did not mind customs searching for it—that was their job, after all—but "what I did mind were the people who hadn't the courage to board the steamer ... they would watch where we buried the stuff and unearth it later on". Those islanders who were prosecuted were angered by what Hutchinson describes as "the perversion of natural justice, by the stain put on their characters and not least by the fact that each of them, members of possibly the most peaceable and law-abiding community on Britain, now had a criminal record".

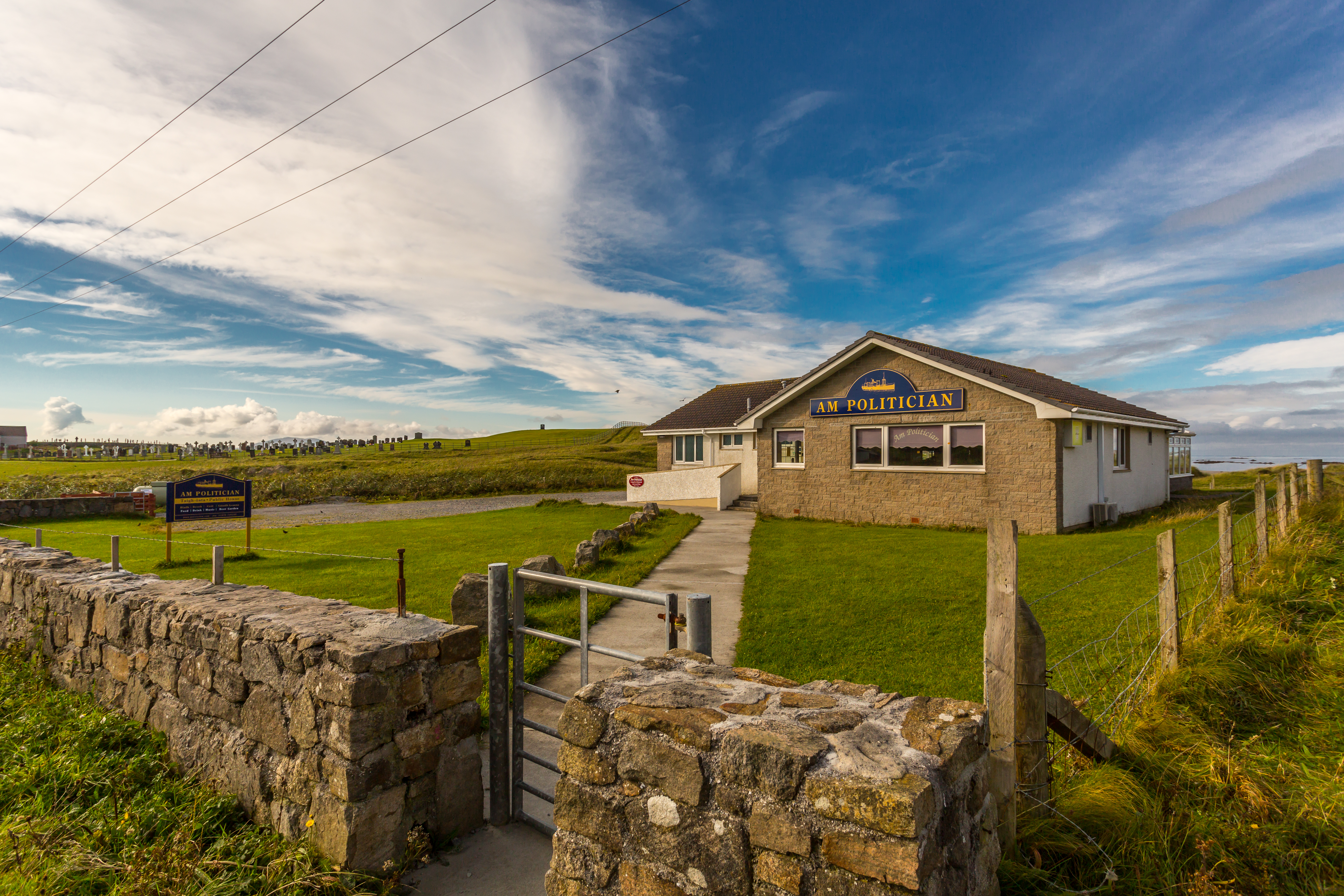
Am Politician, Eriskay's only pub, was named after the SS Politician.

At the official inquiry into the sinking of Politician, Captain Worthington and First Mate Swain were cleared of all blame for her fate. Both returned to sea. Worthington captained SS Arica, which was sunk in November 1942 by U160; he survived the war and died in 1961. Swain commanded SS Custodian, another ship in the Harrison line, and survived the war. E. H. Mossman, Politician's chief engineer, sailed on SS Barrister, which ran aground on rocks off the coast of Ireland in December 1942. According to Hutchinson, Mossman "is reputed to have commented 'we've done it again'."

The writer Compton Mackenzie was a resident of Barra from 1933, and was aware of the events surrounding Politician. In 1947 he published a fictionalised humorous account under the title Whisky Galore; he set the story on two islands, Great Todday and Little Todday and developed the theme of "the right of small communities to self-determination in the face of larger, frequently ignorant, interfering forces", according to the historian Gavin Wallace. The book sold several million copies and was reprinted several times. Two factual books deal with the events surrounding Politician; in 1963 Arthur Swinson published Scotch on the Rocks: The True Story Behind Whisky Galore, which contained a foreword by Mackenzie, and in 1990 Roger Hutchinson wrote Polly: The True Story Behind Whisky Galore.

In 1949 Mackenzie's novel became the source for a film of the same name produced by Ealing Studios; Mackenzie made a brief appearance as the captain of SS Cabinet Minister, the renamed ship that grounded itself on the rocks. The customs men were replaced with Captain Paul Waggett, an English officer of the Home Guard, who vainly seeks out the purloined whisky. The plot device of pitting a small group of British against a series of changes to the status quo from an external agent leads the British Film Institute to consider Whisky Galore!, along with other Ealing comedies, as "conservative, but 'mildly anarchic' daydreams, fantasies". A remake of the film was released in June 2016. In January 1991 the broadcaster Derek Cooper presented Distilling Whisky Galore!, an hour-long documentary on the Politician, the Ealing comedy film and attempts to salvage any remaining cargo.

Because of the loss of the Jamaican notes, and the number that were being cashed in banks, from 1 July 1952 the blue ten-shilling notes were no longer accepted as legal tender. They were replaced with notes of the same design, but printed in purple on a light orange background. As at 2019, one of the notes from the wreck hangs over the bar of the Am Politician, Eriskay's only pub, which was named after the SS Politician.

It was the practice of some Eriskay residents to hide their empty bottles from Politician on Eriskay's interior for fear of incriminating themselves. Many of these were filled with sand from the local beach and turned into lamp bases before being sold in Edinburgh; the provenance was particularly interesting to American tourists who had seen the Ealing film. Several full bottles of whisky were found on the island when locations had been forgotten by those who buried them; sand dunes that changed shape with the wind or a new thatch roof being installed often uncovered a hidden cache. In 1991 one man who moved to Eriskay found four bottles under the floor of the croft he had purchased; he then found two bottles buried in the ground outside.

Several bottles have been raised from the wreck by divers. In 1987 a diving expedition brought up eight bottles, described as being "in perfect condition", and in 1989 the Glasgow-based company SS Politician Plc was formed to raise £500,000 for a salvage operation to locate any further bottles on the wreck. The salvage operation took place during the calm weather of the summer months of 1990, but in the first storm at the end of the summer the rig secured over the wreck site was blown off its moorings and the salvage operation was cancelled. The operation uncovered 24 bottles. A blended whisky, SS Politician, containing a small amount of the whisky they had raised was produced, but did not sell well and the company went into liquidation. A separate brand of whisky has been released under the name SS Politician, although this has no connection with the first brand or the whisky from the ship. The various finds of whisky—whether found on land or raised from the wreck—have been placed at auction. (Note: Examples of the prices are: 1988: Eight bottles: £4,000; an average of £500 each.; 1993: Fourteen bottles: £11,400; an average of about £815 each.; 2008: One bottle: £2,200.; 2010: One bottle of Ballantine: £4,200.; 2013: Two bottles: £12,050; an average of £6,025 each.; 2020: A bottle salvaged in 1987 was sold at auction for £9,200, despite being labelled "not suitable for human consumption".; The wooden lid from a case of Ballantine was sold in 2003 for £1,500.)

== Notes and references ==
=== Sources ===
==== Books ====
- Bathurst, Bella (2005). The Wreckers: A Story of Killing Seas and Plundered Shipwrecks. Boston, MA: Houghton Mifflin. ISBN 978-0-6184-1677-6.
- Duguid, Mark; Freeman, Lee; Johnston, Keith M.; Williams, Melanie (2012). Ealing Revisited. London: Palgrave Macmillan. ISBN 978-1-84457-510-7.
- Haswell-Smith, Hamish (2008). The Scottish Islands. Edinburgh: Canongate. ISBN 978-1-84767-277-3.
- Hutchinson, Roger (2007). Polly: The True Story Behind Whisky Galore. Edinburgh: Mainstream Publishing. ISBN 978-1-8401-8071-8.
- McArthur, Colin (2003). Whisky Galore! and the Maggie: A British Film Guide. London: I.B. Tauris. ISBN 978-1-86064-633-1.
- Sunderland, David (2013). Managing the British Empire: The Crown Agents, 1833–1914. Woodbridge, Suffolk: Boydell Press. ISBN 978-1-84383-841-8.
- Swinson, Arthur (2005) [1963]. Scotch on the Rocks: the True Story Behind Whisky Galore. Edinburgh: Luath Press. ISBN 978-1-9052-2209-4.

==== Newspapers ====
- "Bottle from Whisky Galore! wreck fetches £2,200". The Times. 4 December 2008. p. 28.
- "Dry agent must eat humble pie". The Semi-Weekly Spokesman-Review. 20 December 1924. p. 1.
- English, Shirley (28 March 2005). "Sour finish to story of Whisky Galore". The Times. p. 12.
- Gill, Kerry (11 August 1987). "Cash store on whisky ship wreck". The Times. p. 3.
- Gill, Kerry (16 December 1989). "Blow for Whisky Galore salvage". The Times. p. 2.
- Goodwin, Karin; Day, Peter (27 March 2005). "Whisky Galore locals used violence to guard their loot". The Sunday Times.
- "I'll drink to that ... Whisky Galore bottle earns diver £9,200 at sale". The Herald. 16 September 2020. p. 7.
- Macnab, Geoffrey (5 July 2016). "A Toast to whimsy and nostalgia". The Independent. p. 41.
- "Manchester shipping". The Manchester Guardian. 26 January 1924. p. 1.
- "Manchester shipping". The Manchester Guardian. 30 March 1928. p. 1.
- "Money galore for booty". The Times. 25 November 1993. p. 6.
- "Must eat humble pie". The Gazette. Montreal. 22 December 1924. p. 10.
- O'Brien, E. D. (13 July 1963). "A literary lounger". Illustrated London News. p. 70.
- Partridge, Frank (3 March 2007). "Complete guide to the Western Isles". The Independent. p. 18.
- Rule, Vera (8 January 1991). "Television and radio: watching brief". The Guardian. p. 36.
- "A tot of whisky galore under the floor". The Times. 20 January 1990. p. 1.
- Turpin, Adrian; Day, Peter (27 March 2005). "Ecosse: looting galore". The Sunday Times.
- Tweedie, Neil (26 January 2001). "Banknotes galore after whisky ship hit the rocks". The Daily Telegraph.
- "Whisky from wreck fetches pounds galore". The Times. 7 May 2013. p. 8.

==== Internet ====
- "Abbreviations". Miramar Ship Index.
- "After the Stranding". Merseyside Maritime Museum.
- Clark, Gregory (2018). "The Annual RPI and Average Earnings for Britain, 1209 to Present (New Series)". MeasuringWorth.
- "Customs and Excise take a different view". Merseyside Maritime Museum.
- "Feliciana (1146553)". Miramar Ship Index.
- "The Last Voyage". Merseyside Maritime Museum.
- "The legend of the 'Polly'". Merseyside Maritime Museum.
- "London Commerce (1146693)". Miramar Ship Index.
- "London Importer (5115434)". Miramar Ship Index.
- "London Shipper (1147474)". Miramar Ship Index.
- "Manchester Regiment (1146830)". Miramar Ship Index.
- "Merchant Shipping Act 1894". The National Archives.
- "Politician (1147482)". Miramar Ship Index.
- "Politician (Stern Portion): Calvay Rock, Eriskay Sound, Sea of the Hebrides". Canmore.
- Sneddon, David (31 March 2006). Coastal Zone Assessment Survey of East Coast of North Uist, Benbecula and South Uist (PDF) (Report). Glasgow University Archaeological Research Division.
- Smith, Gavin. "Whisky Galore". Whisky Magazine. Archived from the original on 18 August 2019.
- "The SS Politician Profile". scotchwhisky.com.

==== Journals ====
- Crawford, Douglas A. (December 1971). "The Politician Notes of Jamaica". International Bank Note Society Journal. 11 (2).
- Wallace, Gavin (6 January 2011). "Mackenzie, Sir (Edward Montague Anthony) Compton: (1883–1972)". Oxford Dictionary of National Biography (online ed.). Oxford University Press. doi:10.1093/ref:odnb/31392. (Subscription, Wikipedia Library access or UK public library membership required.)

==== Other ====
- Cooper, Derek (8 January 1991). Distilling Whisky Galore! (Television production). Channel 4.
- Important British and World Paper Money. London: Dix Noonan Webb. 2010.
- Macmillan, Malcolm, MP (20 December 1960). Parliamentary Debates (Hansard). Vol. 632. United Kingdom: House of Commons. col. 138W.
- Merchant Shipping Act (PDF). Parliament of the United Kingdom of Great Britain and Northern Ireland. 1894.
