= Monja Danischewsky =

British producer and writer (1911–1994)

- Born: Monja Danischewsky; 28 April 1911; Arkhangelsk, Russia
- Died: 16 October 1994 (aged 83)
- Occupation: Film producer

Monja Danischewsky (Russian: Моня Данишевский, romanized: Monya Danishevsky; 28 April 1911 – 16 October 1994) was a British producer and writer.

He was born in Arkhangelsk into a Russian-Jewish family who left Russia for England in 1919. He produced and wrote the films Rockets Galore! (1957), Topkapi (1964), and others.

== Biography ==
=== Early life ===
Monja Danischewsky's family left Russia for Great Britain in 1919.

=== Career ===
Monja started out with various publicity jobs, then to Ealing Studios as publicity director in 1938 and occasional writer. Monja switched to producing in 1949; and later became an independent producer The Galloping Major (1951); returned as producer/writer in mid-1950s and continued briefly after Ealing ended; Rockets Galore (1958) and The Battle of the Sexes (1959). Monja has written two books about his experiences in the film industry. Autobiography, 'White Russian, Red Face', 1966. and 'Out of my Mind', a collection of anecdotes, 1972.

=== Personal life ===
Monja was known as Danny to friends and fellow filmmakers. He married Brenda Danischewsky (born Rattrey) and they had 3 children. In later life he moved to Farnham, Surrey with his wife. He died there at the age of 83.

== Filmography ==
=== As writer ===
- Undercover (1943)
- Bitter Springs (1950)
- The Galloping Major (1951)
- Meet Mr. Lucifer (1953)
- The Love Lottery (1954) (additional dialogue and scenes)
- Rockets Galore! (1957)
- The Battle of the Sexes (1959)
- Two and Two Make Six (1962)
- Topkapi (1964) (screenplay)
- Mister Moses (1965)
- Avalanche (1969) (as John Danischewsky)
- That Lucky Touch (1975) (adaptation)

=== As producer ===
- Whisky Galore! (1949) (associate producer)
- The Galloping Major (1951)
- Meet Mr. Lucifer (1953)
- The Love Lottery (1954)
- The Battle of the Sexes (1959)
- Two and Two Make Six (1962) (producer)
- Avalanche (1969) (producer) (as John Danischewsky)
- Run Wild, Run Freedom (1969)

== Published works ==
- White Russian, Red Face (Gollancz, 1966)
- Out of My Mind (Michael Joseph, 1972)
- short memoir by Danischewsky of Barnett Freedman, in Emma Mason (ed.), Tales of Barnett Freedman (Bread and Butter Press, 2020)
