= Roger Hutchinson (writer) =

British author and journalist

- Born: 1949 (age 76–77); Farnworth, England
- Education: Bretton Hall College
- Occupations: Author and journalist

Roger Hutchinson (born 1949) is a British author and journalist. Hutchinson was born in Farnworth, near Bolton, in Lancashire, but lives on Raasay, off the east coast of Skye.

== Education ==
Hutchinson attended Bretton Hall College in Leeds to study English.

== Career ==
In the late 1960s, around the time he studied English at Bretton Hall College, he founded and edited Sad Traffic, published from a small office in Barnsley, which ran for five issues before morphing into Yorkshire's alternative newspaper, Styng (Sad Traffic Yorkshire News & Gossip).

He then moved to London and edited OZ, International Times and the magazine Time Out.

In the late 1970s, Hutchinson moved to Skye to become a journalist on the West Highland Free Press. Since 1999 he has lived on Raasay.

He has also served as editor of the Stornoway Gazette.

== Books ==
As of 2017, Hutchinson has written 15 non-fiction books.

Polly, The True Story Behind Whisky Galore (1990) was about the SS Politician, the ship that was wrecked on the Outer Hebrides with a cargo of whisky, which inspired the book and film Whisky Galore.

Hutchinson wrote The Real Story of England's 1966 World Cup Triumph ...it is now! in 1995. This book follows the career of Sir Alf Ramsey from his early days in Dagenham through to the 1966 victory.

Hutchinson's book The Soap Man: Lewis, Harris and Lord Leverhulme (2003), was shortlisted for the Saltire Scottish Book of the Year Award.

Calum's Road (2006), about Raasay crofter Calum MacLeod, who hand-built a road to his croft, was shortlisted for the Royal Society of Literature's Ondaatje Prize.

In 2012, Hutchinson published The Silent Weaver, the story of the Uist-raised crofter Angus MacPhee who suffered a schizophrenic breakdown during World War II and subsequently spent 50 years in Craig Dunain Hospital near Inverness where he developed skill in weaving grass taken from the hospital grounds.

As of 2018, Hutchinson's most recent book is The Butcher, the Baker, the Candlestick Maker: The story of Britain through its Census, since 1801 (2017).
