= The Galloping Major (film) =

1951 film by Henry Cornelius

- Directed by: Henry Cornelius
- Written by: Monja Danischewsky; Henry Cornelius; Basil Radford
- Produced by: Monja Danischewsky
- Starring: Basil Radford; Jimmy Hanley; Janette Scott; A. E. Matthews; Rene Ray
- Cinematography: Stanley Pavey
- Edited by: Geoffrey Foot
- Music by: Georges Auric
- Production company: Romulus Films
- Distributed by: Independent Film Distributors
- Release date: 5 May 1951
- Running time: 82 minutes
- Country: United Kingdom
- Language: English
- Box office: £153,770 (UK)

The Galloping Major is a 1951 British comedy sports film directed by Henry Cornelius and starring Basil Radford, Jimmy Hanley and Janette Scott. It was written by Monja Danischewsky, Cornelius and Radford, and made at the Riverside Studios in Hammersmith. The film's sets were designed by Norman Arnold.

The title is taken from the song "The Galloping Major", and the plot is centred on gambling at the horse racing track. People in a London suburb form a syndicate to buy a race horse to run in the Grand National.

== Cast ==
- Basil Radford as Major Arthur Hill
- Jimmy Hanley as Bill Collins
- Janette Scott as Susan Hill
- A. E. Matthews as Sir Robert Medleigh
- Rene Ray as Pam Riley
- Hugh Griffith as Harold Temple
- Joyce Grenfell as Maggie
- Charles Victor as Sam Fisher
- Sydney Tafler as Mr. Leon
- Charles Lamb as Ernie Smart, horse owner
- Charles Hawtrey as Lew Rimmel
- Alfie Bass as newspaper seller
- Sid James as Bottomley
- Kenneth More as Rosedale Film Studio director
- Stuart Latham as Rosedale Film Studio assistant
- Leslie Phillips as reporter
- Michael Ward as racegoer
- Edie Martin as lady at meeting
- Sam Kydd as newspaper vendor
- Thora Hird as newspaper vendor
- Ellen Pollock as newspaper vendor
- Duncan Lamont as newspaper vendor
- Harold Goodwin as street stall owner (uncredited)
- Michael Ward as street stall owner (uncredited)
- Arthur Mullard as Rosedale Film Studio employee (uncredited)
- 'The Galloping Major' (the horse, 'Bobbie') as himself

== Production ==
The film was made as an independent production, backed by the Woolf Brothers. It proved profitable at the box office, but producer Monja Danischewsky quit independent production afterwards to return to work at Ealing Studios. It has been noted as being similar in style to the Ealing comedies of the same era.

It features appearances by several figures well known at the time, including the jockey Charlie Smirke and the radio commentators Raymond Glendenning and Bruce Belfrage.

"Lambs Green" in the film is actually Belsize Village (Belsize Park and Belsize (ward)), London NW3.

The race track was filmed at Alexandra Palace, which can be seen briefly in the background.

== Release ==
The film premiered at the Plaza cinema in London on 5 May 1951. It has also been released on DVD.

== Reception ==
The Monthly Film Bulletin wrote: "The film is described as a fairy tale about horse racing; the idea is a pleasant one, and it is unfortunate that the execution fails to achieve all that it promises. The atmosphere is very similar to that of Passport to Pimlico ... But whereas in the earlier film the action developed from a single comic idea, The Galloping Major tends to employ rather forced plot contrivances – notably the whole excursion to the film studio – to carry the story forward. There are a few agreeable and amusing scenes, but the humour, too, is often less spontaneous than strained: the script writers seem too determined to be funny, and their jokes suffer as a result."

Kine Weekly wrote: "Its types are cleverly drawn and it contains many brilliant satirical touches, but towards the finish it handicaps itself by trying to be a little too clever, Yet despite its few labored moments, it's clean, witty, wholesome and typically English fun."

Variety wrote: "Working with their own script, Danischewsky and Cornelius have made a modest picture which abounds with laugh-provoking sit uations, being packed with delightful directorial touches. The yarn plays down the humorous situations and the reaction is more restrained. This is a technique which has proved effective in British comedy hits on both sides of the Atlantic."

== See also ==
- List of films about horses
- List of films about horse racing
