= West Highland Free Press =

Scottish newspaper

- An Tir, an Canan 's na Daoine – The Land, the Language, the People
- Type: Weekly newspaper
- Owner: West Highland Publishing Company Limited
- Editor: Keith MacKenzie
- Founded: 1972
- Headquarters: Unit 1B Pairc nan Craobh Broadford Isle of Skye IV49 9AP
- Circulation: 3,040 (as of 2024)
- Website: www.whfp.com

The West Highland Free Press was founded in the Scottish Highlands in 1972 as a left-wing weekly newspaper, but with the principal objective of providing its immediate circulation area with the service which a local paper is expected to provide. It is based at Broadford on the Isle of Skye, covering Skye, Wester Ross and the Outer Hebrides.

== Content and columnists ==
The paper's priorities are summarised in the Gaelic slogan on its masthead: "An Tir, an Canan 's na Daoine – The Land, the Language, the People". It is a slogan borrowed from the Highland Land League which, in the late 19th century, fought crucial battles to win security of tenure for crofters.

The land issue is at the heart of the Free Press's politics. The paper perceives a fundamental conflict of interest in private landlordism (which persists to the present), and this is reflected in many of the most celebrated stories which it has reported. It has championed the cause of community land ownership with considerable impact upon public policy including the establishment of a Scottish Land Fund and a Community Land Unit at Highland Enterprise in the late 1990s. The paper has also advocated community co-operatives and other locally based forms of economic development.

The Free Press has consistently championed the cause of the Gaelic language, both by giving it political support and by publishing written Gaelic material. The Press has also reported and campaigned on environmental-impact stories such as the construction of a private-enterprise tollbridge to Skye. It has also supported renewable energy though this has recently proved to be a controversial stance, particularly on the Isle of Lewis. Though generally supportive of the Labour Party, it has also criticised Labour governments on issues such as crofting reform and has played a major part in shaping political debate in the West Highlands and Islands.

The West Highland Free Press has seen a number of notable columnists, including Professor Donald MacLeod, former principal and leading theologian of the Free Church of Scotland College in Edinburgh, Angus Peter Campbell, the award-winning Gaelic writer and award-winning novelist Roger Hutchinson. The paper's founding editor, Brian Wilson, was also a regular contributor since retiring from politics as a Labour MP and British government minister.

The West Highland Free Press is available extensively within the West Highlands and Islands and in towns and cities throughout Scotland, each Friday. The full paper is now also available by subscription on the internet. In 2013, it had a weekly circulation of over 7,500 compared to today's figure of about 3,000.

=== Sacking of Donald Macleod ===
Regular contributor Donald Macleod wrote a 22 May 2015 column on a future "Islamic dominance in Britain". He argued that, while minority groups fit in with the majority, that this would alter once Muslims formed majorities in the UK, saying:

All minorities prefer to keep a low profile and avoid trouble. Generations of British Muslims have done exactly that, many have made an invaluable contribution to British society, and many are perfectly prepared to listen quietly while Christians 'witness' to them.

But when minorities become majorities, things change, as German Jews discovered in the 1930s. Once the Nazis achieved ascendancy, friendly German neighbours suddenly became informants for the Gestapo; and in the event of Islamic dominance in Britain our friendly Muslim shopkeepers will have little option but to march behind the radicals.

West Highland Free Press Editor Ian McCormack required Macleod to "moderate his language", MacLeod refused and resigned. Brian Wilson was then sacked for writing a column criticising his former colleagues. Broadcaster and columnist Maggie Cunningham also left the title in protest.

Editor McCormack later suggested he had made "a serious error of judgement" and was following his worker-owner colleagues' intentions. He made "no apology" for Wilson's sacking. While he "share[ed] many of the views he expressed" he felt the column was a breach of trust, due to its criticism of the paper's owners.

Free speech groups attacked the sacking, while human rights lawyer Aamer Anwar condemned the column as "Islamophobic" lacking in "Jesus's encouragement to 'turn the other cheek'".

== Awards ==
The newspaper has often won awards at the Highlands and Islands Media Awards. In 2012 this included Journalist of the Year, Sports Writer of the Year, Photographer of the Year. In previous years they have also picked up Newspaper of the Year, Website of the Year, Feature Writer of the Year, Gaelic Columnist of the Year, Reporter of the Year.

== Employee ownership ==
On 27 October 2009 the West Highland Free Press became the only employee-owned newspaper in the United Kingdom. The newspaper celebrated its 40th anniversary in April 2012. The newspaper's managing director, Paul Wood, is also a board member with Co-operative Development Scotland, the Scottish Government subsidiary promoting employee-ownership, collaboration and mutualism within Scotland.
