= Whisky Galore! (2016 film) =

2016 film by Gillies MacKinnon

- Theatrical release poster
- Directed by: Gillies MacKinnon
- Screenplay by: Peter McDougall
- Produced by: Iain Maclean; Alan J Wands
- Starring: Gregor Fisher; Eddie Izzard; Sean Biggerstaff; Naomi Battrick
- Production company: Whisky Galore Film
- Release date: 26 June 2016 (Edinburgh)
- Running time: 98 minutes
- Country: United Kingdom

Whisky Galore! is a 2016 British film, a remake of the 1949 Ealing Comedy of the same name, itself based on the novel of the same name by Compton Mackenzie. It was directed by Gillies MacKinnon and stars Gregor Fisher, Eddie Izzard, Sean Biggerstaff and Naomi Battrick. The film premiered at the 2016 Edinburgh Film Festival. It went on general release in Scotland from 5 May 2017 and then in the rest of the UK, Ireland and the US from 19 May 2017. The principal film location was Portsoy, Aberdeenshire, Scotland.

== Plot ==
On the fictional Hebridean island of Todday during the Second World War, pompous Captain Waggett commands the local Home Guard unit, assisted by Sergeant Odd, an experienced soldier. Odd is engaged to Peggy, the daughter of Joseph Macroon, the local postmaster. Macroon's other daughter, Catriona, would like to marry George Campbell, the mild-mannered local school teacher, but he lives under the thumb of his domineering mother who opposes the match.

The island is largely unaffected by wartime shortages until its allocation of whisky runs out, to the consternation of the islanders, for whom the drink is considered an essential part of their lives.

During a night-time fog, the freighter SS Cabinet Minister runs aground near the island. As the ship begins to sink and is abandoned by her crew, the islanders learn that her cargo includes 50,000 cases of Scotch whisky, destined for New York. They prepare to start salvaging the cargo, but are forced to wait 24 hours as it is now the Sabbath.

By the time the salvage operation can get under way, Waggett has learned of the whisky and orders Odd to stand guard. Macroon had earlier told Odd that, by long-standing custom, a man cannot marry without hosting a rèiteach—a betrothal ceremony—and you can't have a rèiteach without whisky. Odd obligingly allows himself to be tied and bound, allowing the islanders to unload a large number of cases before the ship goes down.

Waggett launches a search for the salvaged cases, reluctantly helped by the local policeman, Constable McPhee. The islanders find many ingenious ways of hiding the drink, always managing to stay one step ahead of Waggett. He then enlists the help of Customs and Excise officers led by Mr Farquharson. But the islanders continue to frustrate his efforts at every turn.

The rèiteach goes ahead. Fortified by the drink, the normally abstemious George Campbell finds the courage to defy his mother and declare that he will marry Catriona with or without his mother's blessing.

Waggett is called to the mainland to be questioned by his superiors after the discovery of several bottles of whisky (planted by the islanders) in a case of ammunition which Waggett had shipped to the mainland. While he is away, the weddings of both couples take place during the summer solstice, the celebrations being enlivened by liberal supplies of the "water of life".

== Cast ==
- Gregor Fisher – Joseph Macroon
- Eddie Izzard – Captain Waggett
- Sean Biggerstaff – Sergeant Donald Odd
- Naomi Battrick – Peggy Macroon
- Ellie Kendrick – Catriona Macroon
- Kevin Guthrie – George Campbell
- James Cosmo - MacAlister, the Minister
- Annie Louise Ross - Mrs. Campbell (credited as Ann Louise Ross)
- Iain Robertson - Sammy
- Michael Nardone - Brown
- Brian Pettifer - Angus
- Fenella Woolgar - Dolly Waggett
- John Sessions - Doctor McLaren
- Ken Drury - Mr Bain
- Sean Scanlan - Old Roddy
- Tim Pigott-Smith - Colonel Woolsey
- Holly Howden Gilchrist - Morag
- Antony Strachan - Biffer
- Ciaron Kelly - Constable McPhee
- Kevin Mains - Farquharson

== Production ==
The production spent ten years in development hell. Producer Iain Maclean had initiated the project in 2004 with writer Bill Bryden attached and producers Stephen Evans, Maggie Monteith and Ed Crozier. He raised £400,000 through private investment to finance the development of the film through the company, Whisky Galore Development Ltd. After Bill Bryden was fired, Peter McDougall was brought on board and wrote a script for a planned filming in the summer of 2006. The film never commenced production. Between 2006 and 2010, Stephen Evans and Ed Crozier left the project. In 2012, Iain Maclean, disheartened by the lack of production finance, had to let Whisky Galore Development slip into administration. In 2014 he decided to rekindle the project when he met Irish farmer and businessman Peter Drayne, who agreed to finance the film completely and resurrected the project, as long as the project was started from scratch. It was finally green-lit in 2015 and principal photography commenced later in 2015 in Scotland. In the interim Peter McDougall wrote a second screenplay. According to director Gillies MacKinnon, the film is a modern interpretation, not a proper remake: "The style is contemporary, embracing drama, romance and comedy, with an array of colourful characters providing a platform for a wonderful cast."

== Release ==
Whisky Galore! gained theatrical distribution in UK and US by Arrow and was released in cinemas in Scotland on 5 May 2017.

== Critical reception ==
On Rotten Tomatoes it has a score of 42% based on reviews from 26 critics.

Kate Muir, writing in The Times, gave the film four stars out of five. She praised the "zippy farce" and in particular, Eddie Izzard's portrayal of Captain Waggett played "with psychotic, obsessive joy and a nod to Dad's Army's Captain Mainwaring". Muir also said that "fans of the original film may find little or no improvement in this remake, but for a new generation this Whisky Galore! will be a pleasure".

Toby Symonds, of The Film Blog also praised the film, describing it as "visually and aurally gorgeous".

Helen O'Hara of Empire described the film as "Too restrained and polite to really grip the attention" and feeling "more like comfortable Sunday night TV than cinematic fare", while Jeannette Catsoulis of The New York Times wrote that "Beyond simple nostalgia... the appeal of this limp re-tread is difficult to discern".
