= Brochan Lom =

Scottish song

"Brochan Lom" is a Scottish Gaelic nonsense song about porridge. The tune is popular and appears frequently at Scottish country dances and ceilidhs. It falls into the category of "mouth music" (Puirt a beul), used to create music for dancing in the absence of instruments. It is a strathspey song and is commonly sung or played for the Highland Schottische (a popular ceilidh dance), and for the Highland Fling.

As an instrumental tune, Brochan Lom is also known as The Orange And Blue, Katy Jones’, Kitty Jones, Kitty Jones’, The Orange & Blue Highland, Orange And Blue, The Orange And Blue Highland Fling.

== Lyrics ==
The words vary in different traditions but a common variant is:

	English translation
Brochan lom, tana lom, brochan lom na sùghain Brochan lom, tana lom, brochan lom na sùghain Brochan lom, tana lom, brochan lom na sùghain Brochan lom 's e tana lom 's e brochan lom na sùghain Séist Brochan tana, tana, tana, brochan lom na sùghain Brochan tana, tana, tana, brochan lom na sùghain Brochan tana, tana, tana, brochan lom na sùghain Brochan lom 's e tana lom 's e brochan lom na sùghain Thugaibh aran dha na gillean leis a' bhrochan sùghain Thugaibh aran dha na gillean leis a' bhrochan sùghain Thugaibh aran dha na gillean leis a' bhrochan sùghain Brochan lom 's e tana lom 's e brochan lom na sùghain Séist Seo an rud a gheibheamaid o nighean gobh' an dùine, Seo an rud a gheibheamaid o nighean gobh' an dùine, Seo an rud a gheibheamaid o nighean gobh' an dùine, Brochan lom 's e tana lom, 's e brochan lom sùghain. Séist	Porridge thin and meagre, porridge thin from sowans. Porridge thin and meagre, porridge thin from sowans. Porridge thin and meagre, porridge thin from sowans. Porridge thin, it is meagre and thin, it is porridge thin from sowans. Chorus Meagre and thin porridge, thin, thin, meagre porridge Meagre and thin porridge, thin, thin, meagre porridge Meagre and thin porridge, thin, thin, meagre porridge Porridge thin, it is meagre and thin, it is porridge thin from sowans. Give ye bread to the young men with sowans-gruel, Give ye bread to the young men with sowans-gruel, Give ye bread to the young men with sowans-gruel, Porridge thin, it is meagre and thin, it is porridge thin from sowans. Chorus This is what we used to get from the smith's daughter at the Dun This is what we used to get from the smith's daughter at the Dun This is what we used to get from the smith's daughter at the Dun Porridge thin, it is meagre and thin, it is porridge thin from sowans. Chorus

"This above was a jocular song that arose about some ill-made porridge, which being very thin was declared to be like gruel, or even 'sowans' (the fermented juice of oatmeal husks boiled, in bygone times a favourite article of food in Scotland."

== Use in movies ==
- It appears as a drinking song in Whisky Galore!
- It is a background music theme in The Bridal Path.
- In Pasolini's film The Canterbury Tales, Nicholas in the Miller's Tale spies John the Carpenter (Michael Balfour) singing this tune while leaving for Osney and runs next door to make advances on his wife Alison. The recording used in the film is of Jimmy MacBeath.

== Recordings ==
- The Highland Council website "Am Baile: Highland history and culture" has two versions:

- a version with voice and piano from the CD Cluich Còmhla – Òrain is Ranna where the words are very clearly pronounced.
- a version sung by Christina Stewart with instrumental accompaniment, from the album Bairn's Kist (2011).

- The website of Learning and Teaching Scotland has a version on violin.
- Calum Kennedy recorded this on the album "Songs in Gaelic" (2008)
- Robin Hall & Jimmie Macgregor with The Galliards recorded this on the album Scottish Choice (1960)
- Oran recorded a version on their album "Kith & Kin".
- The Glasgow Gaelic Musical Association recorded a choral version on the album "Orain Is Puirt-a-Beul" (1993).
- The Session lists 16 instrumental recordings of the tune.
