= Two and Two Make Six =

1962 British film by Freddie Francis

- Theatrical release poster
- Directed by: Freddie Francis
- Written by: Monja Danischewsky
- Produced by: Monja Danischewsky
- Starring: George Chakiris; Janette Scott; Alfred Lynch; Jocelyn Lane
- Cinematography: Desmond Dickinson; Ronnie Taylor
- Edited by: Peter Taylor
- Music by: Norrie Paramor
- Production companies: Prometheus Film; Shepperton Studios
- Distributed by: Bryanston Films (UK)
- Release date: May 1962 (UK)
- Running time: 89 min.
- Country: United Kingdom
- Language: English
- Budget: £116,401

Two and Two Make Six (also known as A Change of Heart and The Girl Swappers) is a 1962 black and white British romantic comedy film directed by Freddie Francis and starring George Chakiris and Janette Scott.

== Plot ==
American serviceman Larry is serving in England when he goes absent without leave. After accidentally knocking out a sergeant sent to arrest him he goes on the run with a girl, Julie, riding a motorcycle around rural England. At a transport cafe, due to parallel bikes and leathers as seen from the back, she gets on the pillion of the wrong motorcycle (that of Tom Bennett), and her counterpart Irene gets on Larry's bike. Both girls realise their mistake ten minutes later.

Both couples return to the cafe to resolve it. Tom is ridiculed at the counter. Larry returns but speeds off when he sees a police car. One couple go to Sevenhills and one to Westport.

Tom heads to his Aunt Phoebe, who runs a college for young ladies in Sevenhills. Aunt Phoebe is immediately confused and thinks a love triangle is on the cards, but she treats Tom and Julie with great kindness.

Larry takes Irene to a hotel, but they are suspicious and refuse to give him a room. Eventually Ted, a barman, gives them a tip of a hotel which will take them. The night porter is surprised when they ask for two rooms rather than one.

Julie appears in Tom's bedroom in her pyjamas and they chat. He is very shy but she kisses him.

Larry heads to the docks to organise an illicit passage out of the country but his cash is in Sevenhills. He goes back to Irene's hotel room and tells her the whole story. She is sleeping nude but is very prim and polite. The next day she buys a new dress and heads to locate Sevenhills Ladies College and Aunt Phoebe. Meanwhile Julie goes clothes shopping, using some of Larry's money that he had left with her. Back at the college she treats Tom to a view of her in a basque. Larry appears at the door and a fight between the men ensues.

Irene tells Larry that she loves him. She materialises at the US Army HQ as Larry gives himself up. She claims to be pregnant by Larry (untrue) in order to lessen his court martial sentence.

We jump to both girls pushing prams.

== Cast ==
- George Chakiris as Larry Currado
- Janette Scott as Irene
- Alfred Lynch as Thomas 'Tom' Ernest Bennett
- Jocelyn Lane as Julie Matthews
- Athene Seyler as Aunt Phoebe Tonks
- Bernard Braden as Sergeant Sokolow
- Malcolm Keen as Harry Stoneham
- Ambrosine Phillpotts as Lady Smith-Adams
- Jack MacGowran as night porter
- Robert Ayres as Colonel Robert Thompson
- Edward Evans as Mack
- Harry Locke as Ted
- Ken Wayne as Major Calhoun
- Jeremy Lloyd as bowler-hatted young man
- Marianne Stone as Grand Hotel day receptionist

== Production ==
Two and Two Make Six was based on an idea of a producer after Freddie Francis saw two people out riding. Francis later recalled that he was encouraged the make the film by Monja Danischewsky but thought that the script was inappropriate for children. He rewrote the script to make it more kid-friendly, which annoyed Danischewsky, who did not expect Francis to make major alterations. It was George Chakiris' first film after West Side Story.

== Reception ==
=== Box office ===
The film received poor reviews and recorded a loss of £53,000.

=== Critical ===
The Monthly Film Bulletin wrote that Two and Two Make Six was "a rather gauche and – despite the way it sports crash-helmets and black jackets – dated little romantic comedy" and that "Freddie Francis's direction lacks the necessary lift and confidence. ... It is the cast, in fact, which enables the film to be indulgently enjoyed."

The Radio Times Guide to Films gave the film 2/5 stars, writing: "Ace cinematographer Freddie Francis made his directorial debut with this trifle about a US Air Force deserter who rides off on his motorbike and falls in love with his pillion passenger. ...Francis seemed happier with later horror fare and eventually went back behind the camera for such movies as The Elephant Man."

Leslie Halliwell said: "Reasonably fresh little romantic comedy."
