= Sowans =

Scottish dish

- Type: Porridge
- Place of origin: Scotland
- Main ingredients: Oat-husk starch, water

Sowans or sowens (/ˈsu.ɪnz/; /ˈsʌuɪnz/; /sɔɪnz/; /swinz/; Scottish Gaelic: sùghan), also called virpa in Shetland, is a fermented Scottish dish made using the starch remaining on the inner husks of oats after milling. The husks are allowed to soak in water and ferment for a few days. The liquor is strained off and allowed to stand for a day to allow the starchy matter therein to settle. The liquid part, or swats, is poured off and can be drunk. The remaining sowans is boiled with water and salt until thickened, then served with butter or dipped in milk. The flavour is distinctly sour.

== See also ==
- Brochan Lom
- List of porridges
