= Henry Raynor =

British musicologist and author

Henry Broughton Raynor (29 January 1917 – 23 July 1989) was a musicologist and a British author.

== Biography ==
He was born at 11 Mellor Street, Moston, Manchester, in England, to Gertrude Raynor, an examiner of waterproof garments. The Raynor family was poor and Raynor's formal education was limited by the family's lack of resources. Poor health in childhood left him with time to listen to music and to read extensively.

== Music biography ==
He wrote several books, mainly relating to classical music. His opus magnum, The Social History of Music, ranges from ancient to 20th-century music, placing composers and their work in cultural and economic contexts.

An example of Raynor's thought is his thesis that the orchestral bombast that developed in nineteenth-century Romantic music was spurred by the need to capture and maintain a fickle, musically untrained paying audience. The demise of aristocratic patronage after the Napoleonic Wars left composers and performers in search of new ways to sustain a career in music.

== Bibliography ==
- Franz Joseph Haydn; his life and work, [London]: Boosey and Hawkes, [c1961]
- Radio and Television
- Social History of Music from the Middle Ages to Beethoven (London: Barrie and Jenkins, 1972; New York: Schocken Books, 1972.)
- Music and society since 1815, (New York: Schocken Books, 1976.)
- Music in England (1980)
- Mahler (1975)
- The Orchestra : a History, (New York: Scribner, 1978.)
- Mozart
- Pelican History of Music (Volume 2 - Contributor)
- Yehudi Menuhin: the story of the man and the musician, (Contributor - Volume 2 by Robert Magidoff) with

Magidoff, Robert, 1905-1970; (London, Hale, 1973.)

- Grove's Dictionary (Contributor to Volume 6)
- Dictionnaire de la Musique (Edited by M. Honneger with Contributions)
- Music in England
