= Keep the Home Guard Turning =

1943 novel

- First edition
- Author: Compton Mackenzie
- Language: English
- Genre: Comedy
- Publisher: Chatto and Windus
- Publication date: 1943
- Publication place: United Kingdom
- Media type: Print
- Followed by: Whisky Galore

Keep the Home Guard Turning is a 1943 comedy novel by the British writer Compton Mackenzie. It portrays the activities of the Home Guard on a remote Scottish island during the Second World War. The characters and setting reappeared in the more famous sequel Whisky Galore in 1947.

The title is a play on the First World War song Keep the Home Fires Burning.

== Bibliography ==
- David Joseph Dooley. Compton Mackenzie. Twayne Publishers, 1974.
- Andro Linklater. Compton Mackenzie: A Life Hogarth Press, 1992.
