= Rockets Galore! =

1958 British film by Michael Relph

- UK release poster
- Directed by: Michael Relph
- Written by: Monja Danischewsky (adaptation)
- Based on: Rockets Galore by Compton Mackenzie
- Produced by: Basil Dearden
- Starring: Jeannie Carson; Donald Sinden; Roland Culver; Mary Campbell
- Cinematography: Reginald Wyer
- Edited by: John D. Guthridge
- Music by: Cedric Thorpe Davie
- Production company: Rank Organisation
- Distributed by: Rank Organisation
- Release date: 28 September 1958 (Glasgow)
- Running time: 94 minutes
- Country: United Kingdom
- Language: English

Rockets Galore! (U.S. title: Mad Little Island) is a 1958 British comedy film directed by Michael Relph and starring Jeannie Carson, Donald Sinden and Roland Culver. It was written by Monja Danischewsky, adapted from the 1957 novel of the same title by Compton Mackenzie.

It was a sequel to Whisky Galore!, with Gordon Jackson, Jean Cadell and Catherine Lacey reprising their same roles from the earlier film.

== Plot ==
In the Cold War era of post-Second World War Britain, the government decides to establish a guided missile base in Scotland. The German project leader Dr Hamburger proposes the best location is the Hebridean isle of Todday. The inhabitants are not happy with this disruption of their way of life, and hamper construction as much as they can. An RAF officer, sent to negotiate with the people, falls in love with Janet Macleod, the local schoolteacher and realises what the base would mean to the islanders. A delegation of scientists and air force personnel go to make a presentation to the islanders.

When a missile is launched from another Scottish site, the guidance system fails and the missile returns to the land, rather than out at sea. As it is technically on privately owned land, the islanders claim it and celebrate their 'victory' by dancing around the site. The RAF tries unsuccessfully to negotiate, but eventually abandons the base.

As a further impediment to the base the locals 'discover' a rare pink seagull that only nests on Todday (dyed pink by Janet). The government abandon the idea of the base.

Drooby goes to London for a TV programme with Richard Dimbleby to discuss the pink seagulls. A separate TV debate "Free Speech" then considers the issue of national security versus wildlife.

The gulls prove a tourist attraction and the hotel is renamed the Pink Gull Hotel. The next generation of gulls are born pink.

== Cast ==
- Finlay Currie as narrator
- Jeannie Carson as Janet Macleod
- Donald Sinden as Hugh Mander
- Roland Culver as Captain Waggett
- Catherine Lacey as Mrs. Waggett
- Noel Purcell as Father James
- Ian Hunter as Air Commodore Watchorn
- Duncan Macrae as Duncan Ban
- Jean Cadell as Mrs. Campbell
- Gordon Jackson as George Campbell
- Alex Mackenzie as Joseph Macleod
- Carl Jaffe as Dr. Hamburger
- Nicholas Phipps as Andrew Wishart
- Jameson Clark as Constable Macrae
- Ronnie Corbett as Drooby
- James Copeland as Kenny MacLeod
- John Stevenson Lang as Reverend Angus
- Reginald Beckwith as Mumford
- Arthur Howard as Meeching
- John Laurie as Capt. MacKechnie
- Jack Short as Roderick
- Richard Dimbleby as himself

== Production ==
The film was made at Pinewood Studios with sets designed by the art director Jack Maxsted.

In the team of Basil Dearden and Michael Relph, Dearden usually directed but Relph directed Rockets Galore! saying:

It always boiled down to my getting the subjects on which he wasn’t particularly keen. And I am not really temperamentally cut out to be a director. A director has to have a tremendous amount of patience and the ability to take detailed pains, and I find it very difficult to do that. I get impatient, start to cut corners, and I am much more at home being a producer.

Donald Sinden said "Whisky Galore! was based on a true story, whereas Rockets Galore, not so good, was on the same location but based on an invented story."

== Release ==
The film had its premiere on 28 September 1958 at the Odeon cinema in Glasgow, Scotland. Relph said the film "wasn’t a great success. It was rather a silly thing to do — to make a sequel to Whisky Galore!"

== Reception ==
The Monthly Film Bulletin wrote: "Sequels are notoriously tricky propositions and this one is no exception. Despite the presence of many of Whisky Galore's original characters and players, Rockets Galore puts too much faith in its collection of rusty character studies and determinedly Gallic whimsy. The film has a serious core, of course (its tone is distinctly anti-rocket), yet its variable invention and faltering direction fail to weld the two elements satisfactorily. The second half is quite lively, though: there is an amusing montage of newspaper headlines and some pleasantly dry playing from Duncan Macrae, Jean Cadell and other familiar Scots faces."

Variety wrote: "The rocket, which hangs so menacingly over the world, could misfire badly as a comedy subject. But Rockets Galore handles the topical idea tactfully. There is satire in the film, but the treatment is warmly lighthearted and the result is a picture which is full of fun and should amuse most audienccs. ...Rockets was filmed on the remote Isle of Barra where, some time ago, Tight Little Island was shot. Rockets is not nearly as funny as that film, but has the advantage of color and superb shots of the island scenery. .. This is quite a slight theme, but Monja Danishcewsky's witty screen play and Michael Relph's friendly direction create a pleasant atmosphere admirably sustained by a sound cast."

Howard Thompson of The New York Times wrote of the film: "the general tone is good-natured, the fun is wholesome, if spotty and somewhat forced, and the color photography of the remote little island is altogether lovely. … But it's a far cry from those succinct, Scotch-inspired hiccups that put Todday (actually the Isle of Barra) on the movie map."

Filmink called it "a sequel that no one asked for ... Rank tried yet again with its contract players Donald Sinden and Jeanie Carson and yet again the public didn’t really care; there are bright moments, and nice colour, but Michael Relph wasn’t as good a director as he was a producer."

== Bibliography ==
- McFarlane, Brian (1997). An autobiography of British cinema : as told by the filmmakers and actors who made it.
