= Rèiteach =

Traditional Scottish betrothal ceremony

A rèiteach (Scottish Gaelic pronunciation: [rˠeːhdʲəx]) was a betrothal ceremony in the older Gaelic culture of the Scottish Highlands. It is also attested in Gaelic-speaking Canada.

== Etymology ==
The Scottish Gaelic word rèiteach, which was written réiteach until the spelling reform, means "agreement", "settlement" or "reconciliation" generally, and "wedding arrangement" in particular. Rèiteach also has the meanings "level place" and "disentangling", and the original sense may have to do with the idea of clearing away obstacles. (Réiteach is also the Irish word for "agreement" or "solution", but the Irish dictionaries make no mention of the betrothal ceremony.)

== Traditions ==
The custom was still in practice in the first part of the 20th century, and involved the groom's party visiting the bride's house with an offer.

Sometimes the rèiteach was divided into two parts, an rèiteach beag (the small rèiteach) or a' chiad rèiteach (the first rèiteach), which was more private and simple, and an rèiteach mòr (the big rèiteach), at which the details and practical issues were worked out. At the rèiteach mòr, the whole community would be present, and the bride and groom would reenact for them the commitment made at the rèiteach beag.

In one tradition the suitor would ask his prospective father-in-law for some gift, perhaps a boat or a cow, which was understood as a metaphor for the daughter. An informant from Harris remembers:

He got up and said that he had heard that Jim [her father] had a ewe lamb that was inclinded to stray, and that he would be glad to take the ewe lamb off his hands and put it into a safer place, and that we wouldn't need to worry about the ewe lamb then because it would be in its own fold as it were. Jim replied 'Yes', he was quite happy to let him have the ewe lamb because he knew it was going into good hands.

In another tradition, at the rèiteach mòr, the groom would be presented with a series of "false brides", whom he would have to reject politely until the real bride was offered.

== Literature and popular culture ==
The custom has become known in the English-speaking world through the novel and films Whisky Galore. In both the 1949 film and the 2016 remake, the rèiteach is depicted as a ritual in which bride and groom drink whisky from a quaich in the presence of the whole community, after which there is drinking and dancing. The importance of whisky for the ceremony is a key element in the plot. In the original novel, Compton Mackenzie writes:

"Suppose the boat comes but the whisky doesn't, Father James?" Duncan asked. "What rèiteach can anybody be having? It's against nature to have a rèiteach with tea and ginger-ale and lemonade. Even if there was plenty beer it would still be against nature."

"The fairies will bring up the whisky, Duncan", Father James assured him solemnly.

In 1922 the Gaelic playwright Iain N. MacLeòid produced a play entitled Réiteach Móraig (Morag's rèiteach), a companion to his play Pòsadh Móraig (Morag's wedding).

The Scottish Celtic rock group Runrig have a song entitled "A reiteach" in their 2008 live album Year of the Flood.

A detailed account of a ‘reiteach’ in Harris in the early 1930s features in Finlay J. MacDonald’s memoirs ‘ ‘Crowdie and Cream’’ (1982).
