= Rockets Galore (novel) =

1957 novel by Compton Mackenzie

- First edition
- Author: Compton Mackenzie
- Language: English
- Genre: Comedy
- Publisher: Chatto & Windus
- Publication date: 1957
- Publication place: United Kingdom
- Media type: Print
- Preceded by: Ben Nevis Goes East

Rockets Galore is a 1957 comedy novel by the British writer Compton Mackenzie. It is part of his sequence of Highland Novels, and its title echoes that of an earlier entry in the series, 1947's Whisky Galore, and sees the inhabitants of a remote Scottish island resist a government plan to build a missile base on their home. The author refers to it, in an Author's Note, as a 'bitter farce', as opposed to the 'genial farce' that Whisky Galore was.

== Plot ==
In the Cold War era of post-Second World War Britain, the government decides to establish a guided missile base in Scotland. The German project leader, Dr Emil Hamburger, proposes that the best location is on the two Hebridean islands of Great Todday and Little Todday. Other nearby islands have already been evacuated to make way for the bases that will be built.

Andrew Wishart, a Minister at the Scottish Office, is reluctant to fall in with the plans of the "Ministry of Protection". He travels with his private secretary, Hugh McInnes, to the islands. On the ship, Hugh meets, and is smitten with, a visiting Irish singer, Jane Kinsella, who is researching old Gaelic songs. They later marry, despite she being Roman Catholic and Hugh a Protestant.

Hugh and Jane honeymoon on the islands and decide that they must support the islanders opposition to the rocket research. Hugh resigns and joins the family woollen goods business. Although some of the islanders plan to profit from the building developments, most are opposed, especially on Little Todday, where the islanders are led by the formidable Father James, the Roman Catholic priest. When a rocket goes astray, it is 'captured' by the islanders, Notices of Eviction are issued, but torn up. Machinery mysteriously disappears or fails to work.

RAF, Army and Government try unsuccessfully to find a way out. Then Hugh obtains some pink dye through the business and conspires that an ornithologist friend of his will 'discover' a rare pink seagull that only nests on a small island off Todday. The government, under siege by conservationists, abandons the idea of the base.

The gulls prove a major tourist attraction. And even the Roman Catholic and Protestant priests are united and reconciled.

== Film adaptation ==
In 1958 the story was made into a film Rockets Galore! directed by Michael Relph and starring Jeannie Carson, Donald Sinden and Roland Culver. The story was changed somewhat and some characters changed.

== Bibliography ==
- Burton, Alan. Historical Dictionary of British Spy Fiction. Rowman & Littlefield, 2016.
- Goble, Alan. The Complete Index to Literary Sources in Film. Walter de Gruyter, 1999.
