= Kate Muir =

Scottish writer and documentary maker

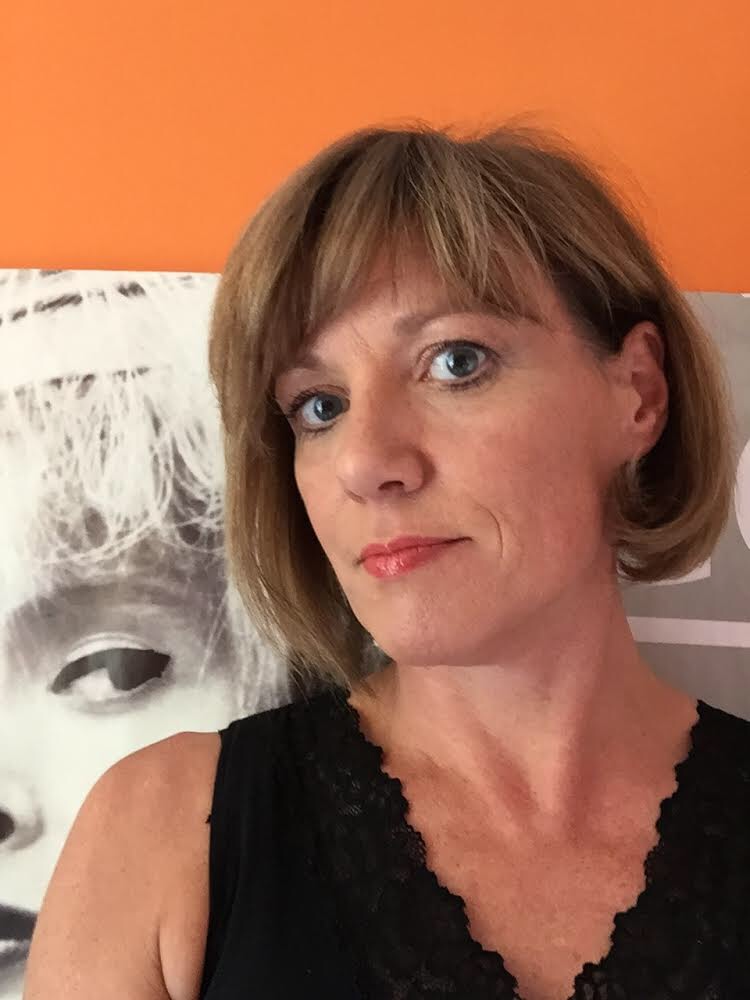
Kate Muir

Kate Muir (born 22 April 1964) is a Scottish writer, women's health campaigner and documentary film-maker. Her book, How to Have a Magnificent Midlife Crisis was published in 2025, following Everything You Need to Know About the Menopause (But Were Too Afraid to Ask) in 2022, and Everything You Need to Know About the Pill (But Were Too Afraid to Ask) in 2024. She is the creator and producer of two documentaries on the menopause including Davina McCall: Sex, Myths and the Menopause for Channel 4 current affairs, as well the Pill Revolution documentary. She was chief film critic of The Times for seven years, and is the author of three novels.

== Early life ==
Muir was born on 22 April 1964. She grew up in Dalmuir, West Dunbartonshire, and attended Westbourne School in Glasgow. At the University of Glasgow, she graduated with an LLB in Jurisprudence and Politics, and later completed a postgraduate journalism diploma at Cardiff University.

== Career ==
Whilst at university Muir was the co-editor of the student newspaper the Glasgow University Guardian. Muir's first job was on the Ealing Guardian, and then she worked as a reporter for two start-up newspapers: News on Sunday in Manchester and The Sunday Correspondent in London, before arriving at The Times in 1990 as a weekly interviewer. She was posted to New York in 1992, then Paris in 1995, then Washington D.C. in 1999 as a foreign features writer for The Times. In Paris, she began a weekly personal column in The Times Magazine which continued for 11 years.

In 2010, Muir became the chief film critic of The Times, covering reviews and film festivals. At a Cannes press conference in 2011 her question regarding Nazi aesthetics resulted in a huge faux pas for Danish director Lars von Trier and his subsequent ban as persona non grata from the film festival. During her time as a critic, Muir became a campaigner for Women and Hollywood, which advocates for equality and diversity in Hollywood and the wider movie industry. She has also worked with Time's Up UK and Birds' Eye View, a charity which promoted the distribution of female-led films. Muir left The Times in 2017 to work as a writer and filmmaker.

Muir has written three novels: West Coast, Left Bank and Suffragette City, and the non-fiction books, The Insider's Guide to Paris and Arms and the Woman, about the battle for female equality in the military. How to Have a Magnificent Midlife Crisis (Simon and Schuster) was published in June 2025, Everything You Need To Know About the Menopause... (Simon and Schuster) was published in January 2022, and Everything You Need To Know About the Pill in April 2024 (Simon and Schuster). Muir has also produced three documentaries of women's health with Finestripe productions in Glasgow for Channel 4. She is a professional speaker and advocate on women's health, contraception and the menopause.

== Personal life ==
Muir has three grown-up children and lives with her husband Cameron Scott in London. She was previously married to author Ben Macintyre.

== Publications ==
- How to Have a Magnificent Midlife Crisis, Simon and Schuster, 5 June 2025, ISBN 978-1-3985-2550-4
- Everything You Need to Know About the Menopause (but were too afraid to ask), Simon and Schuster, 20 January 2022, ISBN 978-1398505643
- Everything You Need to Know About the Pill (But Were Too Afraid to Ask), Simon and Schuster, 11 April 2024, ISBN 978-1-3985-2951-9
- West Coast, Headline Review, 4 September 2008, ISBN 0755325044
- Left Bank, Headline Review, 2 January 2006, ISBN 0755325028 (released as a paperback on 25 September 2006)
- Suffragette City, Macmillan, 9 July 1999, ISBN 0330389718
- Arms and the Woman, 27 April 1992, Sinclair-Stevenson Ltd, ISBN 978-1-85619-115-9
- The Insider's Guide to Paris, Robson Books, 5 July 1999, ISBN 1861051654

Media offices
Preceded by James Christopher	Film critic: The Times; February 2010-	Succeeded by Incumbent
