= Whisky Galore (novel) =

1947 novel by Compton Mackenzie

- First edition
- Author: Compton Mackenzie
- Language: English
- Genre: Farce
- Publisher: Chatto and Windus
- Publication date: 1947
- Publication place: United Kingdom
- OCLC: 56468167
- Preceded by: Keep the Home Guard Turning
- Followed by: Hunting the Fairies

Whisky Galore is a novel written by the Scottish author Compton Mackenzie. It was published in 1947. It was adapted for the cinema under the title Whisky Galore!. The book has sold several million copies and has been reprinted several times.

== Plot summary ==
During the Second World War, the cargo vessel S.S. Cabinet Minister is wrecked off a remote fictional Scottish island group – Great Todday and Little Todday – with fifty thousand cases of whisky aboard. Owing to wartime rationing, the thirsty islanders had nearly run out of the "water of life" and see this as an unexpected godsend. They manage to salvage several hundred cases before the ship sinks. But it is not all clear sailing. They must thwart the efforts of the authorities to confiscate the liquor, particularly in the shape of misguided, pompous Home Guard Captain Paul Waggett. A cat-and-mouse battle of wits ensues.

Although the wreck and the escapades over the whisky are at the centre of the story, there is also a lot of background detail about life in the Outer Hebrides, including e.g. culture clashes between the Protestant island of Great Todday and the Roman Catholic island of Little Todday. (Mackenzie based the geography of these islands on Barra and Eriskay respectively, but in real life they are both Catholic islands). There are various sub-plots including those of two couples who are planning to get married.

Mackenzie's prose captures the various accents of the area and also includes much common Gaelic that was in use at the time. The book includes a glossary of both the meaning and approximate pronunciation of the language.

== Origins of the story ==
The story was based on a real-life incident that occurred in 1941 on the Hebridean island of Eriskay when the SS Politician ran aground with a cargo including 28,000 cases of malt whisky as well as other trade goods headed for Jamaica and New Orleans. Official files released by The National Archives show that it was also carrying a sum of cash. In all, there were nearly 290,000 ten-shilling notes, which would be worth the equivalent of several million pounds at today's prices. Not all of this was recovered from the wreck.

Mackenzie wrote the novel while resident on the Isle of Barra at his house just near Barra Airport. The house, called Suidheachan, Gaelic for “sitting down place”, was built in 1935 is Category B listed.

The novel followed a 1943 novel by Mackenzie entitled Keep the Home Guard Turning in the same setting.

Mackenzie was said to have based the negative elements of the character Captain Paul Waggett on Dr Bartlett, a personal acquaintance, as an act of personal revenge.

== Adaptations ==
=== Films ===
The novel was first adapted in 1949 as Whisky Galore!, a British comedy film produced by Ealing Studios, starring Basil Radford, Bruce Seton, Joan Greenwood and Gordon Jackson. It was the directorial debut of Alexander Mackendrick; the screenplay was by Compton Mackenzie, an adaptation of his novel, and Angus MacPhail.

A remake of the 1949 film was released in 2016.

=== Stage ===
A theatrical adaptation of the novel, licensed by the Society of Authors (the managers of Compton Mackenzie's literary estate) and written by Paul Godfrey, was first performed as a "bar show" at Perth Theatre in the late 1980s. This adaptation, delivered in the manner of a 1940s radio broadcast, has four BBC Radio Rep actors and a studio manager creating all the locations, characters and sound effects as they would have done in a live radio broadcast. This version was also produced by Mull Theatre in the late 1990s, early 2000s, and 2014, touring to theatres throughout Scotland.

Another adaptation of the novel was staged by the Brunton Theatre Company, Musselburgh, under the direction of Charles Nowosielski, in October 1989.

A musical version of the novel, entitled Whisky Galore – A Musical!, was performed at the Pitlochry Festival Theatre, Scotland in 2009 and 2011. The book was adapted by Shona McKee McNeil and the music was composed by Ian Hammond Brown. A Gaelic language adaptation of the novel was adapted for the stage by Iain Finlay MacLeod, titled Uisge-Beatha Gu Leòr, for a 2015 co-production by A Play A Pie and A Pint at Òran Mór, Robhanis and the National Theatre of Scotland.

== Cultural references ==
The novel's title influenced the name of the first French discothèque, the Whisky à gogo, opened in Juan-les-Pins in 1947 by Paul Pacini after the book was published, and which, in turn, was influential in the naming of West Hollywood's Whisky a Go Go in 1958.
