= Francis Compton (actor) =

English actor (1885–1964)

- Born: Francis Sidney Compton Mackenzie; 4 May 1885; Malvern, Worcestershire, England
- Died: 17 September 1964 (aged 79); Stamford, Connecticut, US
- Occupation: Actor
- Years active: 1904–1964
- Spouses: Peggy Dundas (divorced) Mary Wetmore Wells (before 1964)
- Children: 5
- Relatives: Fay Compton (sister); Compton Mackenzie (brother); Viola Compton (sister); Edward Compton (father); Virginia Frances Bateman (mother); Henry Compton (grandfather)

Francis Sidney Compton Mackenzie (/ˈkʌmptən/; 4 May 1885 – 17 September 1964), known professionally as Francis Compton and also known as Frank Compton, was an English actor. He appeared in several films and television programmes but was primarily known for his stage performances. He was a member of the Compton acting family.

== Early life ==
Compton was born Francis Sidney Compton Mackenzie in Malvern, Worcestershire in 1885, the son of Edward Compton (1854–1918), actor and manager (whose real surname was Mackenzie), and his wife, the actress Virginia Frances Bateman (1853–1940) daughter of the actor Hezekiah Linthicum Bateman, of Baltimore, US. One of his brothers became well known as the author Compton Mackenzie but the other siblings became actors.

== Career ==
As with all other acting members of the Compton family, whose surname was Mackenzie, he took the name Compton professionally. He made his theatrical debut in his father's Compton Comedy Company at the age of 18 in the role of Trip, the foppish footman, in Sheridan's The School for Scandal at the Theatre Royal in Leamington in 1904.

During the First World War he saw active service with the 18th London Regiment, being awarded the Military Cross in 1918. His first performance after the War was as the Doctor in Lennox Robinson's The Lost Leader at Greenwich Village Theatre in New York City in 1919. From then on, he mostly performed in the United States. His last stage performance was as Calon in Dumas's The Lady of the Camellias at the Winter Garden Theatre in 1963.

He first appeared in film in 1936 in Soak the Rich. Other film roles included Rage in Heaven (1941), an uncredited role in Hitchcock's Mr and Mrs Smith (1941), and an uncredited role in They Met in Bombay (1941). He is now best-known for his final film role, as Mr Justice Wainwright, in Billy Wilder's Witness for the Prosecution (1957).

He made many television appearances: he appeared in a 1952 episode of Studio One in Hollywood (1952), a 1955 episode of The Alcoa Hour, Caesar and Cleopatra on NBC(1955–56), two episodes in 1957 of DuPont Show of the Month and a 1962 episode of Naked City.

== Personal life ==
Compton was married twice. His first marriage was to an Australian, Peggy Dundas, with whom he had one daughter, the actress Jean Compton Mackenzie. His daughter Jean would go on to marry the actor Arthur Howard and become the mother of the actor Alan Howard.

He married secondly Mary Wetmore Wells (1905–78). He and his wife had three sons and a daughter: Francis, Edward, Ian and Mary Fay. He died in 1964 in St Joseph's Hospital, Stamford, Connecticut. Both Compton and his wife are buried at Indian Hill Cemetery in Middletown, Connecticut.
