= Sydney Cowell =

British stage actress (1846–1925)

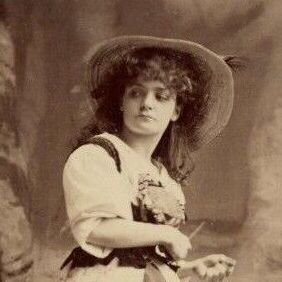
- Born: 1846; London
- Died: 1925 (aged 78–79)
- Occupation: actor
- Known for: her comic roles on New York's Broadway
- Spouse(s): George Giddens, Raymond Holmes

Sydney Mary Cowell (1846–1925) was a British actor, noted for her comic roles on New York's Broadway.

== Life ==
Sydney Mary Cowell was born in London in 1846. She was one of nine children of stage comedian Sam Cowell and Emilie Marguerite Ebsworth. Her paternal grandfather was Joseph Cowell. Her maternal grandparents were stage dramatist Joseph Ebsworth and the actor Mary Emma Ebsworth. Her father's sister was the actor, stage manager and writer Sidney Frances Bateman. Her cousins, Kate and Ellen Bateman, were also on the stage.

Cowell made her own stage debut in February 1864, playing the part of cupid in a production of Ixion at the Prince of Wales Theatre, Liverpool. In 1866 she joined the Theatre Royal in Edinburgh as a soubrette and burlesque actor. After a brief stint at the Theatre Royal in Plymouth, in 1869 she took the title role in Cinderella at the Prince of Wales's Theatre Liverpool. She then played Oberon in a production of A Midsummer Night's Dream at the Queen's Theatre in the West End of London.

In 1871, Cowell joined Charles Wyndham's company to tour America. She remained in America after the company disbanded, taking on roles in Philadelphia, Chicago, and San Francisco. By 1875, Augustin Daly offered her a place in his company to play leading comedy roles. She also played Audrey in As You Like It, Maria in Twelfth Night and the Fool in King Lear.

She returned to the stage in 1895, joining companies at Madison Square and the Garden Theatre companies. She joined Minnie Maddern Fiske's company in 1897, remaining there until 1899. she acted alongside Richard Mansfield and Ethel Barrymore.

== Personal life ==
In around 1879, Cowell married actor George Giddens in Chicago, but she petitioned for a divorce in 1883. Later in the 1880s, Cowell remarried, to fellow comic actor Raymond Holmes. She took a break from acting and touring on health grounds until 1895. Her retirement was announced in April 1903 when she entered the Actors Fund retirement home. By 1909, Cowell was living at the Edwin Forest Home in Holmesburg, Pennsylvania.
