= Isabel Bateman =

American actress

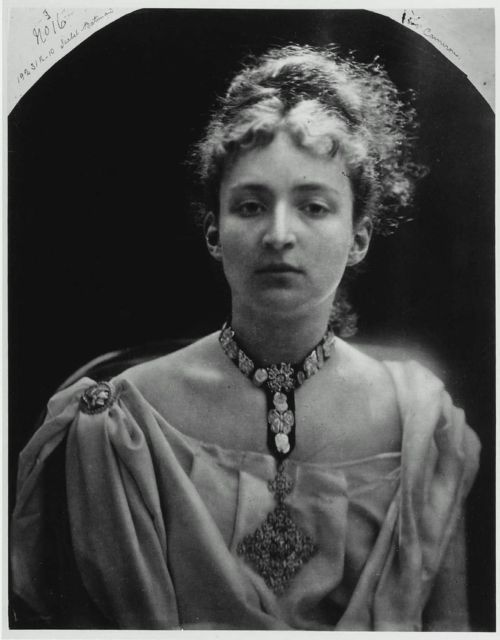
Isabel Bateman, 1874

Isabel Bateman (December 28, 1854 – 1934) was an American-British actress. She was born near Cincinnati, Ohio on December 28, 1854. The daughter of the actors H. L. Bateman and Sidney Frances Bateman, her sisters were actresses Kate Josephine Bateman and Virginia Frances Bateman.

Her family relocated to England in 1863. She first played a juvenile part in 1865 in her sister Kate’s farewell benefit at Her Majesty's Theatre. She began active theatrical work in 1869. She took leading parts with Henry Irving for six years. She was very successful in many leading roles in London.

She left the theatre in 1898 and entered the Anglican Community of St Mary the Virgin in Wantage, eventually becoming Mother Superior of the Order.

== Gallery ==
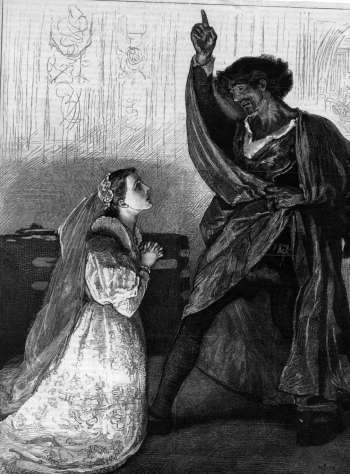
Bateman as Desdemona and Irving as Othello at the Lyceum Theatre, London

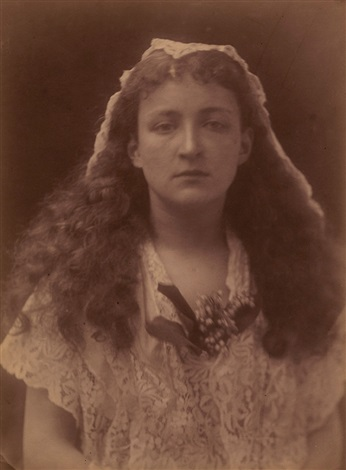
Bateman as Queen Henrietta Maria, 1874

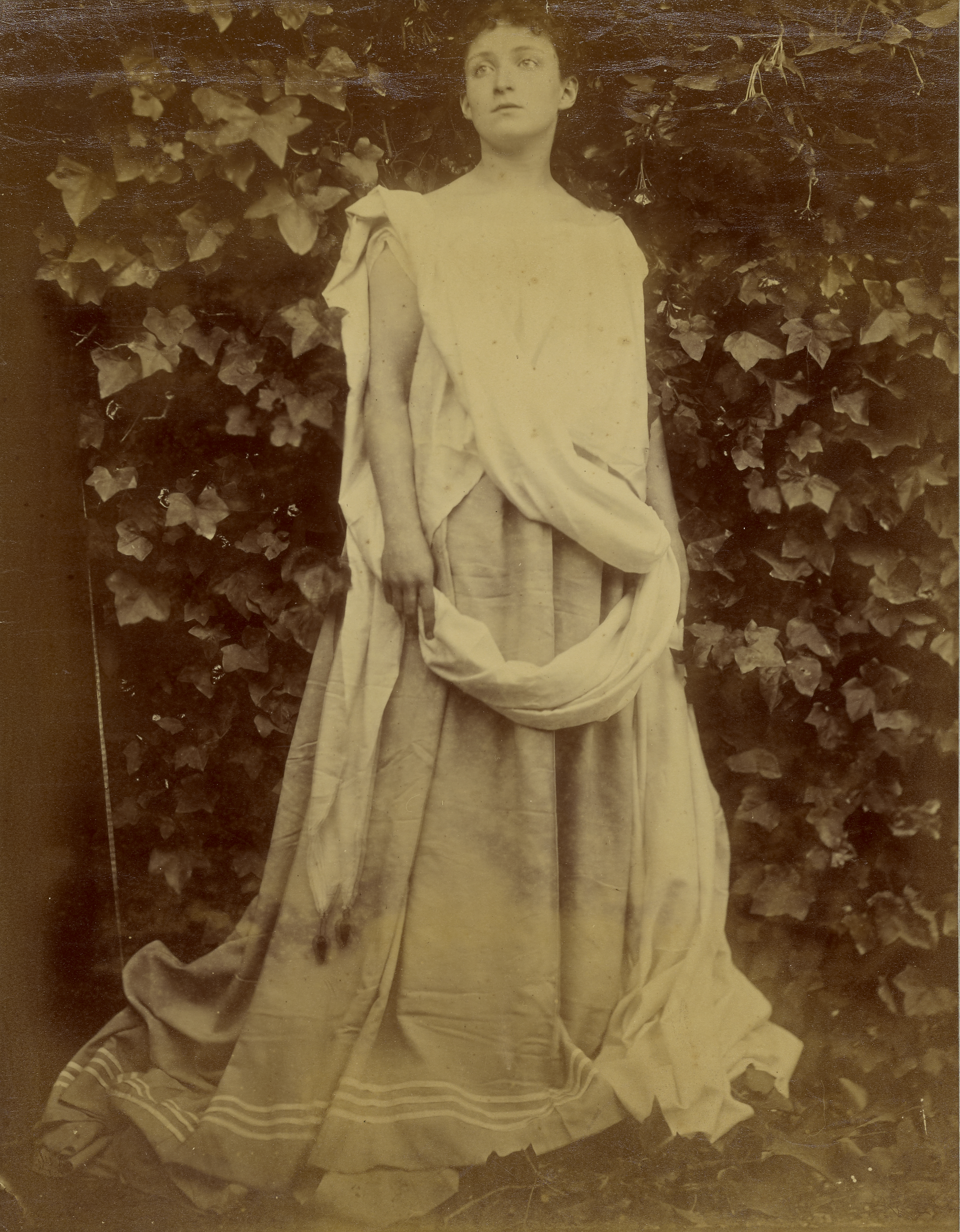
Bateman, by Julia Margaret Cameron, photographed at Freshwater, Isle of Wight, 1874

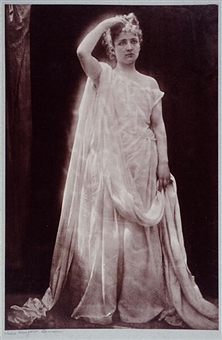
Bateman, by Julia Margaret Cameron, She Walks in Beauty, 1874
