= Ida Barr (singer) =

English music hall singer (1882–1967)

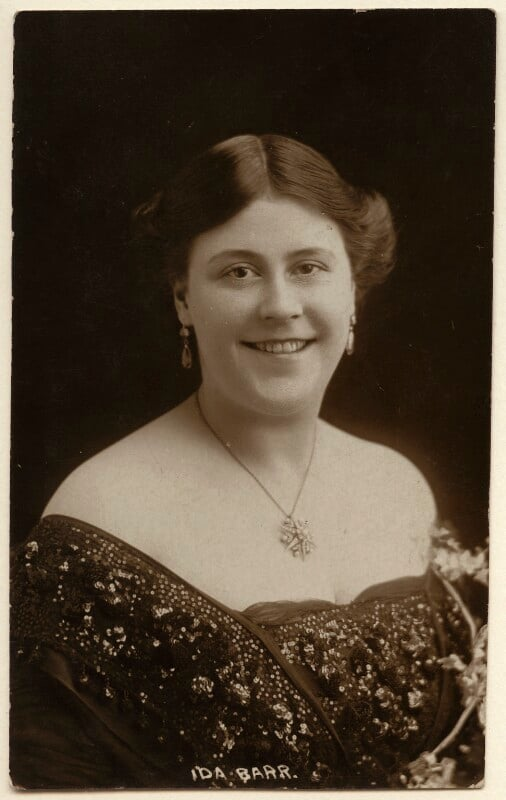
- Barr in the late 1900s
- Born: Maud Barlow; 17 January 1882; Regent's Park Barracks, London, England
- Died: 17 December 1967 (aged 85); London
- Occupation: Music hall singer
- Known for: "Oh, You Beautiful Doll" (1910) "Everybody's Doing It" (1911)
- Spouses: Gus Harris (1910–1914); C. W. Marriott (1919–?)

Ida Barr (born Maud Barlow, 17 January 1882 – 17 December 1967) was an English music hall singer.

== Life and career ==
Barr was born at Regent's Park Barracks, London on 17 January 1882. Her father, William Barlow, is believed to have been a soldier, although Maud described him as a retired civil servant on her marriage certificate.

She made her stage debut in 1898 as a chorus girl at the Theatre Royal, Belfast. Initially calling herself Maud Laverne, she first used the stage-name Ida Barr in 1908 at London's Bedford Theatre.

Barr married comedian Samuel 'Gus' Harris (billed as "the only Yiddisher Scotsman in the Irish Fusiliers"), but the marriage failed within a few years, with Maud soon sailing to New York. Achieving some success in America, Barr returned to England a premier singer of ragtime songs, popularising in Britain the songs "Oh, You Beautiful Doll" (Ayer & Brown; 1910) and "Everybody's Doing It" (Berlin; 1911).

She toured worldwide, earning good money, but was over-generous and failed to save. She became in her old age reliant on welfare benefits, living in a small flat off the Charing Cross Road in London. Writer and broadcaster Daniel Farson, a music hall enthusiast, took it upon himself to extend a helping hand, bringing Barr to a new (or nostalgic) audience on record and television. It was through Farson, too, that variety entertainer Danny La Rue arranged a benefit concert for Barr.

== Death ==
Ida Barr died on 17 December 1967 in London.

== Film and TV credits ==
Barr's screen credits span the years 1936 to 1966.

=== Film credits ===
- Happy Days Are Here Again (1936)
- Laugh It Off (1940)
- Let the People Sing (1942)

=== TV credits ===
- Music Hall Cavalcade (1937)
- Stars and Garters (1965)
- Love Story (1966)

== Trivia ==
- Actress Elsa Lanchester performed in her youth a snake dancing routine with Ida Barr.
- Ida Barr's name was appropriated more than 40 years after her death by Kit Green for an unrelated, non-tribute character comedy act.
- Ida Barr was (through her marriage to Gus Harris) a great-aunt of actress and singer Anita Harris.
