= The Labour Leader =

- Directed by: Thomas Bentley
- Written by: Kenelm Foss
- Starring: Fred Groves; Fay Compton; Owen Nares
- Production company: British Actors Film Company
- Distributed by: International Exclusives
- Release date: June 1917
- Country: United Kingdom
- Language: English

The Labour Leader is a 1917 British silent drama film directed by Thomas Bentley and starring Fred Groves, Fay Compton and Owen Nares. The film was based on an original screenplay by Kenelm Foss.

== Plot summary ==
After his friend impregnates a laundress, a socialist marries her while navigating his own rise to become a Labour Party Member of Parliament.

== Cast ==
- Fred Groves as John Webster
- Fay Compton as Diana Hazlitt
- Owen Nares as Gilbert Hazlitt
- Christine Silver as Nell Slade
- Lauri de Frece as Bert Slade
- Frederick Volpe as Sir George Hazlitt

== Bibliography ==
- Low, Rachael. History of the British Film, 1914-1918. Routledge, 2005.
