= All the Sad World Needs =

1918 British silent film by Hubert Herrick

- Directed by: Hubert Herrick
- Written by: Kenelm Foss
- Starring: Lauri de Frece; Joan Legge; Lennox Pawle
- Production company: British Actors Film Company
- Distributed by: Stoll Pictures
- Release date: August 1918
- Country: United Kingdom
- Languages: Silent; English intertitles

All the Sad World Needs is a 1918 British silent drama film directed by Hubert Herrick and starring Lauri de Frece, Joan Legge and Lennox Pawle.

== Cast ==
- Lauri de Frece as Peep O'Day
- Joan Legge as Rhoda Grover
- Lennox Pawle as George Grover
- Adelaide Grace as Miss Flint
- Cyprian Hyde as Ernest Hanbury

== Bibliography ==
- Low, Rachael. History of the British Film, 1918–1929. George Allen & Unwin, 1971.
