= Regent's Park Barracks =

British Army barracks in London, England

- Albany Street Barracks
- Part of London Garrison
- Camden, London in England
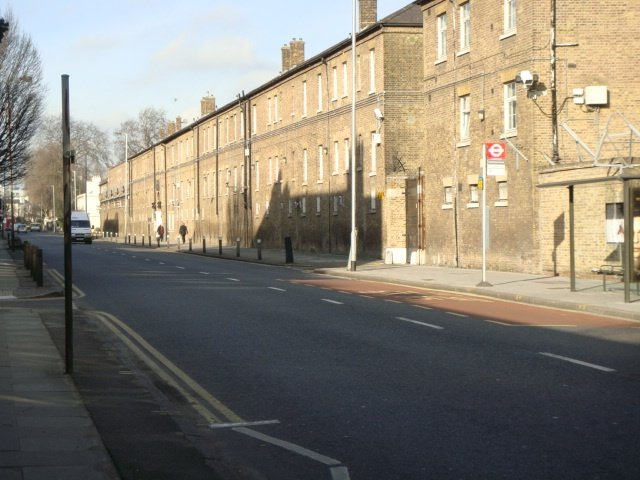
- Regent's Park Barracks seen from Albany Street

Site information
- Type: Army barracks
- Owner: Ministry of Defence
- Operator: British Army
- Controlled by: London District
- Condition: Operational

Location
- Location within Greater London
- Coordinates: 51.5325°N 0.1447°W
- Area: 3 hectares (7.4 acres)

Site history
- Built: 1820–1821
- Built for: War Office
- Architect: John Nash
- In use: 1821 – present

Garrison information
- Occupants: 20 Logistic Support Squadron, Royal Logistic Corps; 21 Special Air Service Regiment (Artists) (Reserve); Regimental HQ, Queen's Royal Hussars

The Regent's Park Barracks, commonly known as the Albany Street Barracks, is a British Army barracks located on Albany Street, London, near Regent's Park.

== History ==
The barracks were constructed in 1820–1821 as cavalry barracks for the Life Guards and the Royal Artillery as part of John Nash's original design for Regent's Park. Nash had originally intended the barracks to be situated in the northern area of the park, well away from the residential area, and separated from the rest of the park by Regent's Canal. However Nash's plan was not accepted in its entirety by the Crown with one of the changes involving a change in the location of the barracks to its present site.

In 1848, the barracks were described in the Topographical Dictionary of England:

The cavalry barracks in Albany-road are neatly built of brick, and occupy an area of eight acres and a half; the buildings comprise accommodation for 400 men, with stabling for their horses, a riding-school, infirmary, magazine, and an extensive ground for exercise.

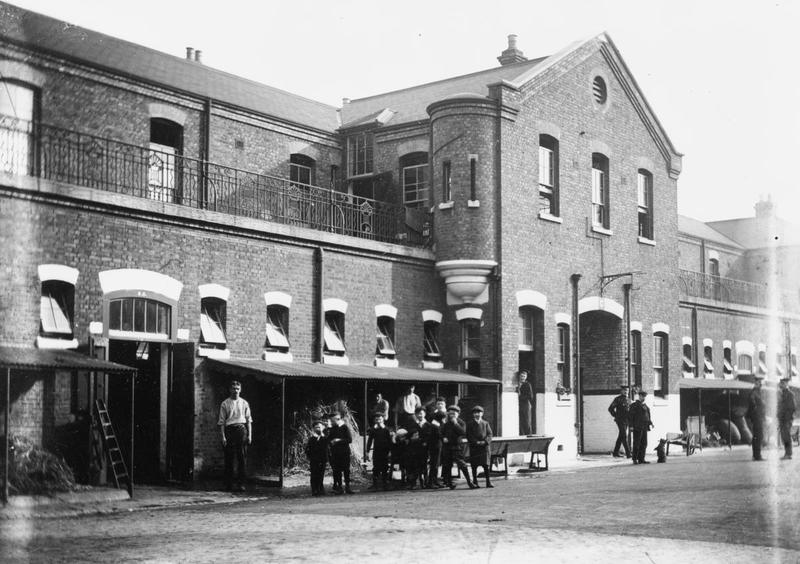
The barracks in 1904

Originally designed to house 450 officers and men and 400 horses the barracks were almost entirely rebuilt between 1891 and 1893. The rebuilding followed the original general layout, and carried out under the supervision of Colonel R. Athorpe. The layout comprises a complex of buildings arranged around a parade ground. The only building to survive from the original barracks is the officers' mess which was built between 1820 and 1821 and is situated on the east side of the parade ground. Other buildings at the northern end of the site include the Gothic chapel which was built in 1857 and the hospital which was built in 1877. Three parallel blocks used for soldiers' accommodation and stables, service buildings and the riding school were all built in 1891. From 1896 to 1969, the Royal Horse Guards were based there, which later became part of the Blues and Royals.

On 24 September 1971 an anarchist group called the Angry Brigade bombed the barracks in response to Operation Banner, the British Army's presence in Northern Ireland during the Troubles.

== Current units ==
Today the barracks are the home of 20 Logistic Support Squadron, Royal Logistic Corps, 21 Special Air Service Regiment (Artists) (Reserve) and the regimental headquarters of the Queen's Royal Hussars, as well as the Queen's Royal Hussars Collection Trust charity.

== Popular culture ==
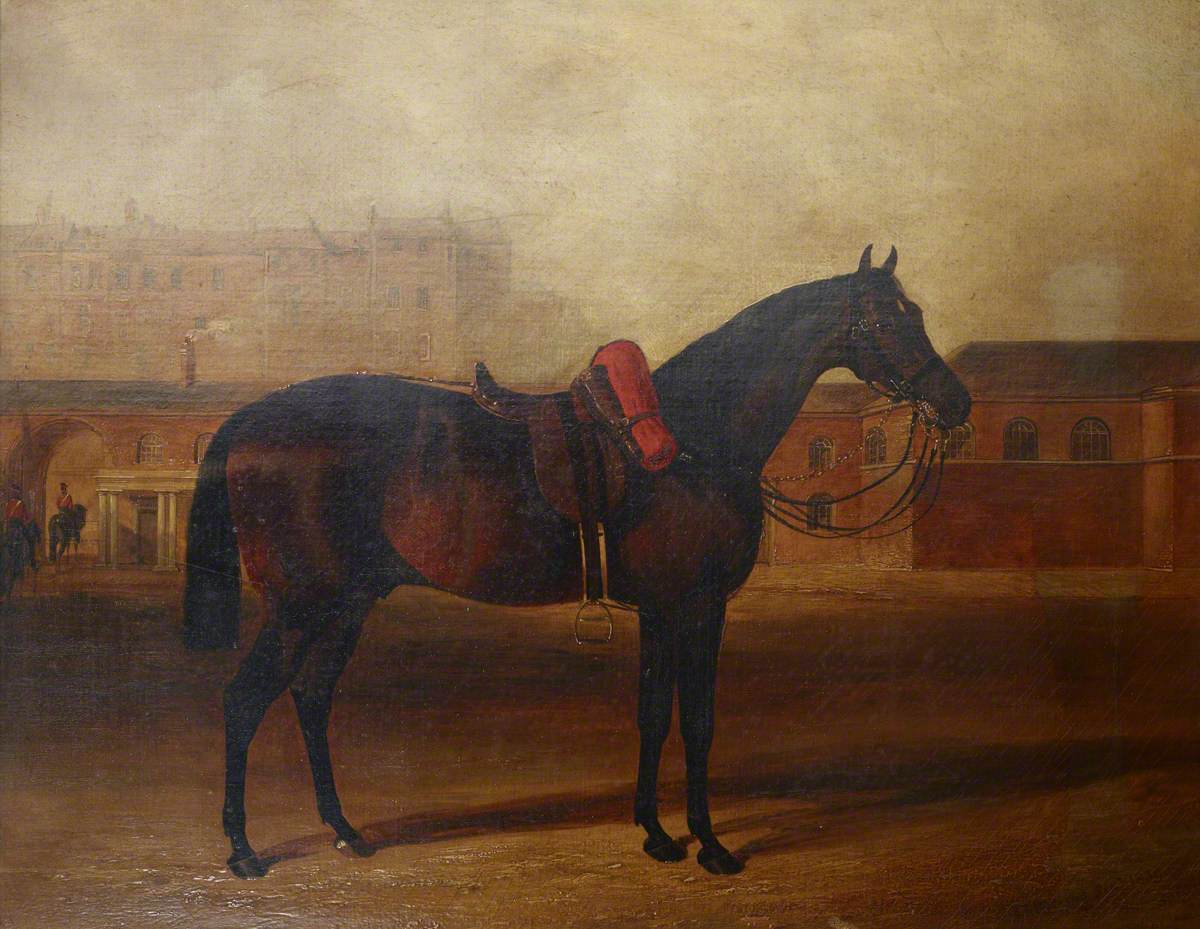
Painting dated 1839: 'A Charger on the Parade Ground of Albany Barracks, London' by John Frederick Herring Sr.

The music hall singer Ida Barr, whose real name was Maud Barlow, was born in the barracks on 17 January 1882, the daughter of a corporal-major in the Life Guards.

In H. G. Wells' The War of the Worlds, there is a mention of the barracks: "the sound of drumming and trumpeting came from the Albany Street Barracks".

== See also ==
- List of British Army installations
