= Sidney Frances Bateman =

American dramatist

Sidney Frances Bateman

Sidney Frances (Cowell) Bateman (March 29, 1823 – January 13, 1881) was an American actress, playwright, and theatrical manager who spent much of her career on the American stage.

== Biography ==
Sidney Frances Cowell was the daughter of Joseph Cowell, an English comic actor who had settled in America, and the actress Frances Cowell (née Sheppard). Aged 16 she married Hezekiah Linthicum Bateman, also an actor. They moved to St. Louis in the 1850s before moving on to New York and later to London, where Hezekiah managed the Lyceum Theatre.

After her husband's death in 1875, Sidney Frances Bateman continued to manage the Lyceum for another three years until she had a disagreement with Henry Irving over the quality of her daughters' acting, when it was reported: "With regard to the Lyceum, it is stated that the difference between Mr. Irving and Mrs. Bateman had reference to the personnel of the company. Mr. Irving is said to have told Mrs. Bateman that he was resolved to have actors to act with him, and not dolls, otherwise he would no longer play at the Lyceum. The result was that Mrs. Bateman threw up the management of the theatre, and Mr. Irving takes her place." She became manager of the Sadler's Wells Theatre and took her daughters with her. She held the position until her death. She was the first to bring to England an entire American company with an American play, Joaquin Miller's The Danites.

Bateman was also the author of several popular plays, in one of which, Self (1857), she and her husband made a great success.

== Family ==
The Batemans had at least six children, with all four of their daughters appearing on stage. The two oldest, Kate (b. 1842), and Ellen (b. 1845), began their theatrical careers so young that their act was known as the "Bateman Children." Bateman and her husband managed the children's careers, including extensive touring, for a decade before the girls retired from child acting in 1856. Kate would later return to the stage as an adult actor and appeared in several plays produced or written by her mother.

The third daughter to go on the stage was Virginia Frances Bateman (1853-1940), who first appeared in London in the title part of her mother's play Fanchetle in 1871. The fourth daughter, Isabel (b. 1854), was also well known on the London stage.

Her niece, Sydney Cowell, was a comic actor who appeared regularly on Broadway.

== Sources ==
- Author Anniversaries
