= Lauri de Frece =

English actor and singer (1880–1921)

- Born: Maurice de Frece; 3 March 1880; Liverpool, England
- Died: 25 August 1921 (aged 41) Trouville-sur-Mer, Normandy, France
- Genres: Musical theatre, Silent films
- Occupations: Actor, Singer
- Spouse: Fay Compton (m. 1914; his death)

Lauri de Frece (born Maurice de Frece, 3 March 1880 – 25 August 1921) was an English actor and singer who appeared in musical theatre and in films of the silent era. He was the younger brother of Walter de Frece and the husband of Fay Compton.

He was sometimes confused with a cousin Lawrence Abraham de Frece, who was born in 1881 and died later the same year.

== Life ==
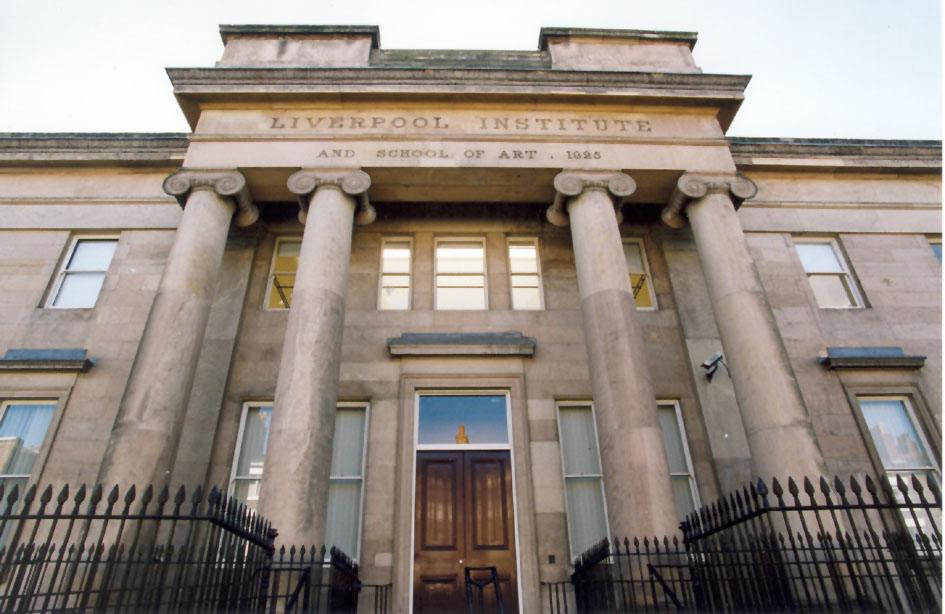
The Liverpool Institute

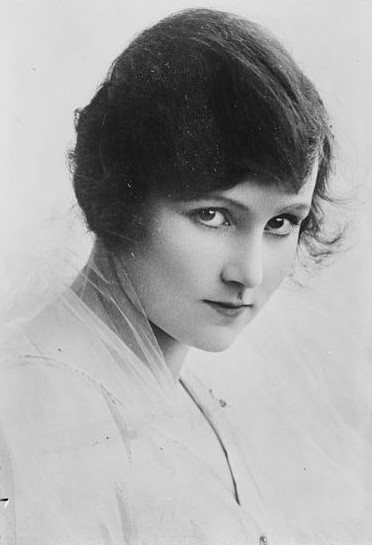
Fay Compton

Born in Liverpool, Lauri de Frece was one of four sons of Harry de Frece, of the Gaiety Music Hall, Liverpool, a prosperous theatrical manager and agent from a Jewish theatrical family. The four sons were well educated at the Liverpool Institute High School for Boys, in the hope of keeping them out of the theatre. However, Frece's brother Jack became the manager of the Alhambra Wooden Theatre, Liverpool, his brother Isaac managed the Theatre Royal, Liverpool, and in 1890 his brother Walter gave up an apprenticeship with a Merseyside architect to marry Vesta Tilley, taking a job in the office of Warner's Theatrical Agency, and going on to become a leading theatrical impresario.

At the Liverpool Institute, de Frece was a contemporary of Albert Coates. In 1910, de Frece appeared as Blatz in the musical The Balkan Princess. In 1912, he sang the part of Brissard in an Edinburgh production of Franz Lehár's operetta The Count of Luxembourg, when he was one of the five principals, together with Daisy Burrell, Phyllis Le Grand, Eric Thorne, and Robert Michaelis, collectively described by the Musical News as "all consummate artists in their own style".

In 1914, after the death of the producer H. G. Pelissier, de Frece married his young widow Fay Compton, with whom he later starred in The Labour Leader (1917).

== Death ==
He died in August 1921, aged 41, from undisclosed causes, in Trouville-sur-Mer, Normandy. In February 1922 his widow remarried, to Leon Quartermaine.

In his Idols of the "Halls", Henry Chance Newton (1854–1931) recalled that "I knew many de Freces, both of the Liverpudlian, and of the London brand; for example, that wonderful old couple, Isaac and Maurice de Frece, Walter's brother Jack, a big variety agent, also that late fine comedian, poor Lauri de Frece, who was the second husband of that brilliant young actress, Fay Compton."

== Musical theatre ==
- The Balkan Princess (1910) as Blatz
- The Count of Luxembourg (1912) as Brissard
- To-Night's the Night (1914) as Henry
- The Happy Day (1916) as Walter
- The Maid of the Mountains as Tonio

== Films ==
Incomplete list

- The Labour Leader (1917)
- Once Upon a Time (1918)
- All the Sad World Needs (1918)
