= Mr. Dick =

Dickens character

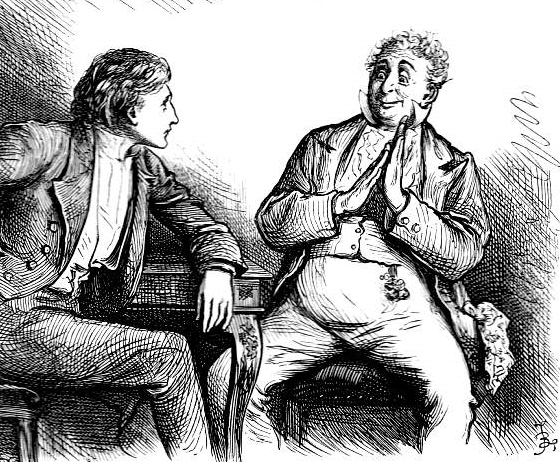
Mr. Dick (R) drawn by Fred Barnard talking to David Copperfield (L): "'Then, I have got it, boy!' said Mr. Dick. And he stood up before me, more exultingly than before, nodding his head, and striking himself repeatedly upon the breast, until one might have supposed that he had nearly nodded and struck all the breath out of his body. 'A poor fellow with a craze, sir,' said Mr. Dick, 'a simpleton, a weak-minded person – present company, you know!' striking himself again, 'may do what wonderful people may not do. I'll bring them together, boy. I'll try. They'll not blame me. They'll not object to me. They'll not mind what I do, if it's wrong. I'm only Mr. Dick. And who minds Dick? Dick's nobody! Whoo!' He blew a slight, contemptuous breath, as if he blew himself away."

Mr. Dick, whose full name is Richard Babley, is a character in the Charles Dickens novel David Copperfield and its many adaptions. His main role in the story is as a wise fool – amiable and innocent but also perceptive and effective.

Mr. Dick has eccentric traits and an obsession with work on his memorial from which he is constantly distracted by thoughts of King Charles' head. He takes his name partly from an acquaintance of Dickens – Captain Samuel Dick, RN. But the name Dick also alludes to Dickens himself, as does the pre-occupation with Charles. Mr. Dick's difficult work on his memorial mirrors Dickens' conflicted role as the author of the novel, which was autobiographical, drawing on Dickens' own traumatic childhood.

== Naming ==
Dick is a common diminutive for the name Richard and so is given this name by Betsey Trotwood, who insists that he is to be referred to in this way, rather than by his full name of Richard Babley. The author, Charles Dickens, was also making other allusions. During 1849, when Dickens was writing David Copperfield, he stayed in a cottage in Bonchurch. His neighbour there was Captain Samuel Dick RN, the Dickens Family dined with the Dick family, and Charles Dickens walked regularly with the son Charles Dick up Saint Boniface Down. Charles Dickens named a friend as Mr Dick, both aged 37 at the time. However Charles Dick's younger sister, Margaret Dick, was jilted at the altar and lived a reclusive life and became the inspiration for Miss Havisham in Great Expectations.

== Appearance ==
Mr. Dick first appears in chapter 13 – "The Sequel of my Resolution" – which was first published in the fifth instalment in September 1849.

The unbroken stillness of the parlour window leading me to infer, after a while, that she was not there, I lifted up my eyes to the window above it, where I saw a florid, pleasant-looking gentleman, with a grey head, who shut up one eye in a grotesque manner, nodded his head at me several times, shook it at me as often, laughed, and went away.

...

After a time she rang the bell. 'Janet,' said my aunt, when her servant came in. 'Go upstairs, give my compliments to Mr. Dick, and say I wish to speak to him.' Janet looked a little surprised to see me lying stiffly on the sofa (I was afraid to move lest it should be displeasing to my aunt), but went on her errand. My aunt, with her hands behind her, walked up and down the room, until the gentleman who had squinted at me from the upper window came in laughing.

== Madness ==
Aunt Betsey explains to David Copperfield that Mr. Dick has been called mad, but that she considers him merely eccentric. Mr. Dick's brother had him committed to an asylum when Mr. Dick became upset by the treatment of his favourite sister. He now attempts to write a memorial documenting his own ill-treatment, but this is constantly interrupted by a fixation about the head of King Charles, who was beheaded in 1649 – "how could the people about him have made that mistake of putting some of the trouble out of his head, after it was taken off, into mine?" Aunt Betsey explains this as transference, "That’s his allegorical way of expressing it. He connects his illness with great disturbance and agitation, naturally, and that’s the figure, or the simile, or whatever it’s called, which he chooses to use."

The form of this delusion was different in the first draft. It was originally an obsession with a bull in a china shop, which had been the subject of a popular song around 1808, being sung by Grimaldi in Sadler's Wells. When Dickens' literary friend, John Forster, proof-read the chapter, he told Dickens that this was too farcical for the character. Dickens agreed and rewrote it, substituting King Charles' head.

Forster later became a Commissioner in Lunacy. Dickens was also interested in the treatment of the insane and, from 1842, he followed the work of Dr John Conolly, Superintendent of the Hanwell Lunatic Asylum, who pioneered reforms, treating inmates with kindness rather than with harsh restraints. In the story, Aunt Betsey's respectful care of Mr. Dick follows this prescription and is rewarded by Mr. Dick's insightful advice and bold strategems.

== Portrayals ==
Actors who have portrayed Mr. Dick include:

- Lennox Pawle in George Cukor's 1935 MGM movie, modelling his performance on Fred Barnard's illustrations;
- Richard Goolden in the 1956 BBC classic serial;
- George Benson in the 1966 BBC classic serial;
- Emlyn Williams in Delbert Mann's 1969 television film;
- Timothy Bateson in the 1974 BBC classic serial;
- Thorley Walters in the 1986 BBC classic serial;
- Ian McNeice (1999)
- Dudley Sutton (2000)
- Hugh Laurie (2019) in the 2019 film adaptation
