= Virginia Frances Bateman =

American actress

Photograph of Virginia Frances Bateman, by Elliott & Fry (c. 1871)

Virginia Frances Bateman (Mrs Edward Compton and Virginia Mackenzie; 1 January 1853 – 4 May 1940) was an American actress and actor-manager who performed with her husband Edward Compton in his Compton Comedy Company which toured the provinces of the United Kingdom from 1881 to 1923. On her husband's death in 1918 she ran the Company. She founded the Theatre Girls' Club.

== Early years ==
Born in New York in 1853, she was one of eight children and the third of four actress daughters of the noted American actor Hezekiah Linthicum Bateman and his wife, the theatrical manager, playwright and actor Sidney Frances Bateman née Cowell. In January 1864 H. L. Bateman took his wife and two youngest girls including Virginia to England, where they settled permanently.

== Career in London ==
Her father became the manager of the Lyceum Theatre in London in February 1871 intending to use the theatre to launch the careers of his daughters Kate, Virginia and Isabel, who were known as The Bateman Sisters. Virginia Bateman, the least talented of the three sisters, first appeared here in the title role of her mother's play Fanchette in 1871, but the play was not a financial success. Among other roles at the Lyceum she played Princess Elizabeth in Tennyson's Queen Mary with Henry Irving as Philip II of Spain. Her father's fortunes improved radically with his presentation of The Bells by Leopold David Lewis, starring Henry Irving. Virginia, her sisters and mother left the Lyceum for Sadler's Wells Theatre in 1878 after Irving refused to act with "dolls".

== Edward Compton ==
In 1881 Virginia Bateman became the leading lady of the actor Edward Compton in his new Compton Comedy Company. They married at St Peter's Church in Brighton on 12 June 1882 and had five children: the novelist Sir Edward Montague Compton Mackenzie (1883–1972) and the actors Frank Compton (1885–1964), Viola Compton (1886–1971), Ellen Compton (November 28, 1891–May 20, 1970), and Fay Compton (1894–1978).

== Later life ==
In 1914 she founded the Theatre Girls' Club which provided low cost temporary accommodation for young actresses during rehearsals (which were often unpaid at that time) or when they were looking for work. The Club was popular and much-used until the 1950s but became less so in the late 1950s and 1960s. In 1920 she became the lessee of the Grand Theatre in Nottingham in an attempt to turn the Compton Comedy Company into a resident repertory company. Her daughters Ellen and Viola Compton managed the theatre as well as acting in the plays old and new, including The School for Scandal and Columbine written specially by her son Compton Mackenzie. She expressed an interest in putting on plays by local author D. H. Lawrence. The Nottingham Repertory Company gained critical praise and featured performances by Sybil Thorndike and Henry Ainley but by 1923 the recession was affecting ticket sales and the venture failed.

Virginia Bateman Compton died in London in May 1940 and was buried with her husband in Brookwood Cemetery in Surrey.
