= Edward Compton (actor) =

British actor (1854–1918)

Edward Compton in about 1905

Edward Compton (14 January 1854 – 16 July 1918) was an actor and actor-manager of the Victorian era who enjoyed considerable success in touring the English provinces with plays by Shakespeare, Sheridan and Goldsmith but who met with failure while trying to break into the West End theatre.

== Early career ==
Born in 1854 at 16 Charing Cross Road in London as Edward Montague Compton Mackenzie, he was the fifth of nine children born to Charles Mackenzie, an actor known as Henry Compton (1805–1877), and Emmeline Catherine née Montague (1823–1911). Edward Compton was educated at the private academy of Revd J. Gaitskell. His first stage appearance was in 1873 at the New Theatre Royal in Bristol as Long Ned in F. Boyle's Old London. In 1874 he joined the Francis Fairlie Touring Company for who he appeared in East Lynne by Alfred Kempe, in Progress by C. R. Munro and The School for Scandal by Richard Brinsley Sheridan, followed by seasons in Bristol, Glasgow, Kilmarnock, Liverpool and Birmingham. His first role in London was at his father's benefit at the Theatre Royal, Drury Lane in March 1877 in which he played Alfred Evelyn in Money by Edward Bulwer-Lytton, going on to appear in his father's second benefit in Manchester later in the same month. This was followed by appearances with the companies of Henry James Byron and Mrs Hermann Vezin.

From 1877 to 1879 Compton toured the United Kingdom in the company of Ellen Wallis for whom he appeared as Michael Cassio in Othello, Malcolm in Macbeth, Romeo in Romeo and Juliet, Florizel in The Winter's Tale, Benedick in Much Ado About Nothing, Orlando in As You Like It, Master Wildrake in The Love Chase, Charles Surface in The School for Scandal and as Claude Melnotte in The Lady of Lyons by Edward Bulwer-Lytton. On 23 April 1879 he played Claudio in Much Ado About Nothing at the dedication of the Shakespeare Memorial Theatre at Stratford-upon-Avon. Later that year with his brother Charles he published the Memoir of Henry Compton.

== Compton Comedy Company ==
Edward Compton in David Garrick (1903)

Compton joined the company of the Adelphi Theatre in London and from September 1879 to July 1880 he accompanied Adelaide Neilson on her successful tour of America, playing in New York, Boston, New Orleans and San Francisco. On completing the tour the company sailed from New York for London with Neilson continuing on to Paris to prepare for her forthcoming marriage to Compton arranged for September 1880. However, while driving in the Bois de Boulogne in August 1880 she suffered a ruptured aneurysm, dying a few hours later. In her will she left Compton £2000. He returned to the Adelphi Theatre for a short period following which he used the bequest to set up the Compton Comedy Company which put on the plays of William Shakespeare and period English comedies across the country from 1881 to 1923. His leading lady was Virginia Frances Bateman (1853–1940), the daughter of the American actor H. L. Bateman. They married at St Peter's Church in Brighton on 12 June 1882 and had five children: the novelist Sir Edward Montague Compton Mackenzie (1883–1972) and the actors Frank Compton (1885–1964), Viola Compton (1886–1971), Ellen Compton (1891–1970), and Fay Compton (1894–1978).

Among other roles Compton played Malvolio in Twelfth Night (1881), Dr. Pangloss in The Heir At Law (1881), Mawworm in Isaac Bickerstaffe's The Hypocrite (1881), Jack Rover in Wild Oats (1882), Tony Lumpkin in She Stoops to Conquer (1882), Charles Surface in The School For Scandal (1883), Dromio of Syracuse in The Comedy of Errors (1883) and Bob Acres in The Rivals (1883).

By 1891 the Compton Comedy Company had been touring the UK for ten years and had given thousands of performances of such plays as Sheridan's The Rivals and The School for Scandal, The Road to Ruin by Thomas Holcroft, David Garrick by T. W. Robertson and She Stoops to Conquer by Oliver Goldsmith. Compton decided that the time was right to take his company to London, and he wrote to Henry James asking him to adapt his novel The American into a play for the stage - to which James agreed. Performed by the Compton Comedy Company, the play premièred in January 1891 in Southport with Compton playing Christopher Newman, the American, and was a financial and critical success.

== Failure ==
Compton took The American to the Opera Comique in London on 26 September 1891, with himself again playing Christopher Newman, but the London audiences were unappreciative of the drama, finding the acting heavy-handed and the plot confusing and uneven. The critic of The Pall Mall Gazette wrote:

The audience was much amused and rather interested by the first act, less amused and more interested by the second, still less amused and rather less interested by the third, and not at all amused and barely interested by the fourth. Then the curtain came down, the people kindly clapped their hands as a means of stretching themselves, the actors appeared and bowed, … and those in front of the curtain went away rather bored and much disappointed, while those behind departed full of false hope.

Despite the attendance of The Prince of Wales at a performance and some reworking of the production The American closed on 4 December 1891 after only 69 performances and causing a great financial loss. Compton's son Sir Compton Mackenzie later described his father's reaction:

He realised that it was not his destiny to be a leading London actor-manager and went back to the provinces where he was so much loved, and where in a white wig instead of a toupee and with patches instead of a false moustache he would be making much more money and doing far more for British drama than by trying to establish himself in London.

== Later years ==
The grave of Edward Compton in Brookwood Cemetery

After this failure the Compton Comedy Company returned to touring the provinces and Edward Compton together with Milton Bode bought several theatres in the provinces and suburbs of London. By August 1915 Compton was preparing to take his company back to London to appear at the Shaftesbury Theatre but he became ill and plans were put on hold. He died of throat cancer at his home, 54 Avonmore Road in West Kensington in London, on 16 July 1918 and was buried in Brookwood Cemetery in Surrey. The Compton Comedy Company continued to tour the United Kingdom until 26 July 1923 when it was disbanded due to the high cost of maintaining it.
