= Kate Josephine Bateman =

American actress (1842–1917)

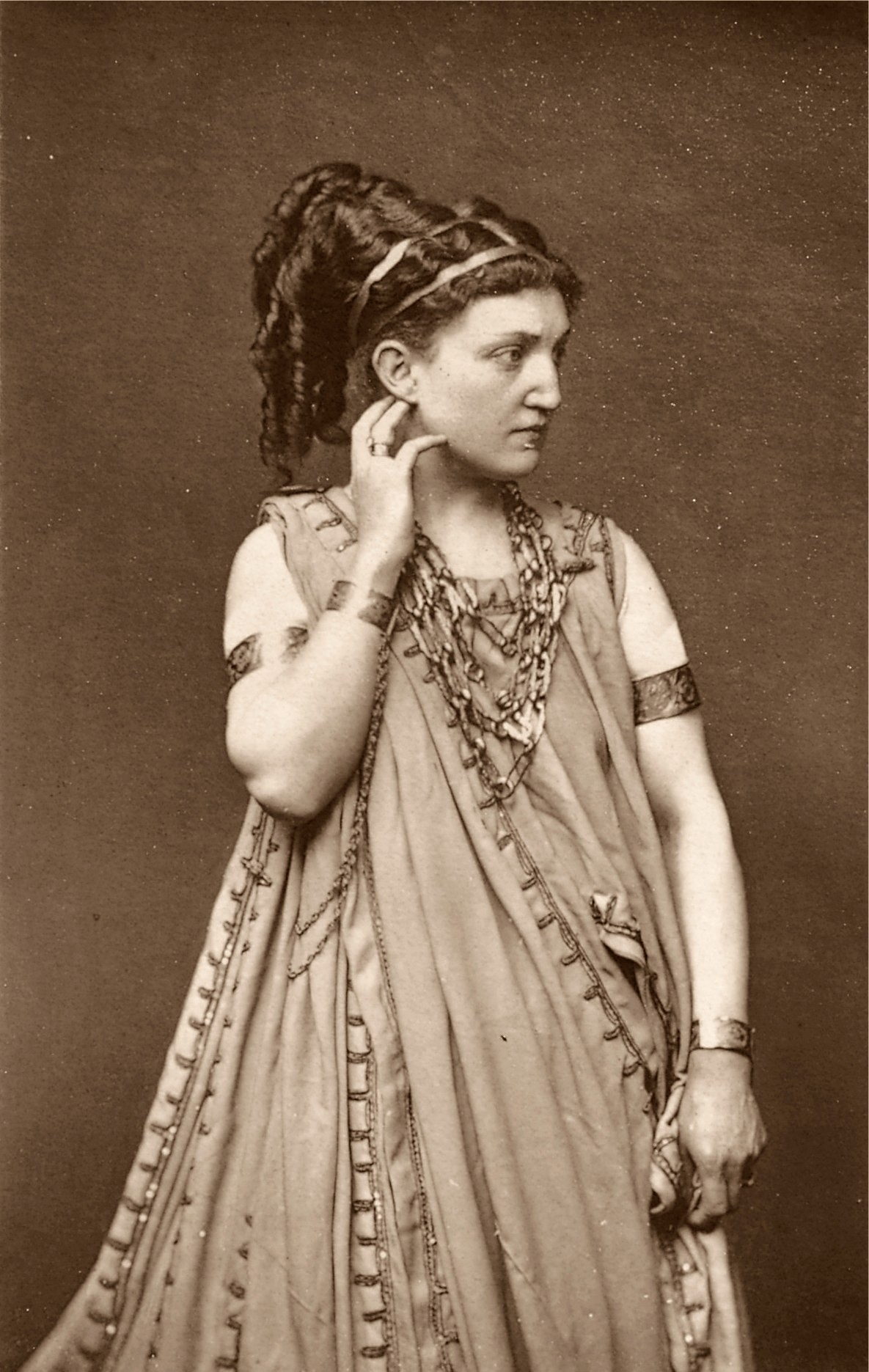
Kate Josephine Bateman

Kate Josephine Bateman Crowe (October 7, 1842 – April 8, 1917) was an American actress. She started out as a child actor with her sister Ellen Bateman, but it was Kate who later developed a career in romantic leading parts.

== Early life and childhood acting ==
Kate Josephine Bateman was born in Baltimore, Maryland. Her father, Hezekiah Linthicum Bateman, was an actor and theatrical manager. Her mother, Sidney Frances Bateman, was a playwright, theatrical manager, and actor, and her maternal grandfather Joseph Cowell was a comic actor. Bateman and one of her sisters, Ellen, showed early theatrical talent, and the senior Batemans devoted themselves to managing their daughters' careers.

Kate began appearing on stage by the age of five, at a time when child prodigies were something of a rage in the United States. After performing with Ellen around the Midwest and Southeast for a couple of years, the girls debuted in New York in 1849; their show included excerpts from several of Shakespeare's plays. The showman P. T. Barnum put them on a large salary to appear at his museum, and in 1850-52 he sponsored their tour of Great Britain as 'The Bateman Children'. This was followed by a long tour of the United States that took the girls to California. In 1856, Kate and Ellen retired from child acting.

== Later acting career ==
In 1859, the Bateman family moved to New York, and the following March, sixteen-year-old Kate appeared in her mother's adaptation of Henry Wadsworth Longfellow's Evangeline at New York's Winter Garden. This role launched Bateman on her adult career as an actor, and she eventually became known primarily for romantic roles like Shakespeare's Juliet and Pauline in The Lady of Lyons as well as leading roles in melodramas. Another early success was as Julia in The Hunchback in 1862.

One of Bateman's most celebrated roles was as the title character in Leah the Forsaken, Augustin Daly's adaptation of Mosenthal's Deborah. The play opened in Boston in 1862, moved to Niblo's Garden in New York in 1863, and then went to London for a three-year run. Despite poor reviews, it proved to be very popular, in part due to Bateman's highly emotional performance. In 1863, Bateman wrote A Memoir of Miss Bateman; it included her observations about performing the play together with some extracts from the play itself.

In 1866, Bateman married George Crowe (1841-1889), son of Eyre Evans Crowe (a former editor of the London Daily News). She settled in England with him and left the stage for two years.

After Bateman returned to the stage she appeared regularly at the Lyceum Theatre in London with her sisters Virginia and Isabel. Here she played the role of Lady Macbeth with Henry Irving and in 1875 took the title-part of Tennyson's Queen Mary. When her mother became manager of the Sadler's Wells Theatre in 1879, she appeared as Helen Macgregor in Rob Roy, followed in 1881 by the role of Margaret Field in Henry Arthur Jones's His Wife.

In the late 1880s, Bateman left the stage again for several years due to an illness. She returned in 1891 in Henry James' The American. The following year, she opened a school for acting in London.

In 1907, she appeared in Euripides' Medea.

In 1917, Bateman died from a cerebral hemorrhage. She was buried at Hendon parish church.

== Descendants ==
Her daughter, Sidney Kate Bateman Crowe (1871-1962), was also an actor, as was her granddaughter, Sidney Kate Leah Hunter (1892-1941), who used the stage names Leah Hunter and Leah Bateman Hunter.

== In popular culture ==
An 1865 London appearance by Bateman in Hamlet was referenced in chapter 5 of James Joyce's novel Ulysses. The character Bloom reminisces: "Poor papa! How he used to talk of Kate Bateman in that. Outside the Adelphi in London waited all the afternoon to get in. Year before I was born that was: sixty-five."
