= The Black Hand Gang =

1930 film by Monty Banks

- Opening titles
- Directed by: Monty Banks
- Written by: Victor Kendall
- Based on: play Bert Lee and R.P. Weston
- Starring: Wee Georgie Wood; Dolly Harmer; Violet Young
- Cinematography: Walter Blakeley
- Release date: 1930
- Running time: 63 minutes
- Country: United Kingdom
- Language: English

The Black Hand Gang is a 1930 British comedy film directed by Monty Banks and starring Wee Georgie Wood, Viola Compton and Alfred Wood. It was written by Victor Kendall based on the play Black Hand George by Bert Lee and R.P. Weston, and made by British International Pictures and at Elstree Studios as a quota quickie.

== Plot ==
Georgie Robinson is the leader of The Black Hand Gang, a motley collection of youngsters, engaged in ongoing rivalries with other gangs. The Black Handers capture a thief who, on the run from the police, enters the gang's cellar headquarters, while the gang are all there.

== Cast ==
- Wee Georgie Wood as Georgie Robinson
- Viola Compton as mother
- Alfred Woods as father
- Dolly Harmer as Mrs. Robinson
- Violet Young as Winnie
- Lionel Hoare as the other man
- Junior Banks as Archibald

== Reception ==
Film Weekly wrote: "Monty Banks has gathered a picturesque set of urchins to act with Wee Georgie Wood in this merry 'all-children' film. The picture, which deals with warfare of gar gangs and rival leaders, and has a romantic interest, is full of hearty, broad comedy. It concludes with an excellent piece of knock-about farce in the form of a large-scale street fight. All the children in this film are refreshingly natural, and Wee Georgie Wood fits in well as the leader of the gang. Good fun, if a trifle heavy-handed. The children in the film are nearly all from the poorer parts of London, chiefly found near the Edgware Road. Monty Banks's young son also has a part – his first – in the film."

The Daily Film Renter wrote: "Wee Georgie Wood ... , who has a big following, is supported by company of street urchins, all natural comedians. A virile laughter-piece without a dull moment in it. ... Undoubtedly the best juvenile comedy produced in this country, this subject is destined to be a winner. It is an elaborated version of one of Georgie Wood's most popular music-hall sketches, and its excellence proves definitely the limitations of the stage proper. The original, played all round the country as a one-scene sketch, has been developed almost beyond recognition, for talkie purposes, and, produced by indefatigable Monty Banks."
