= Sam Cowell =

English music hall entertainer (1820–1864)

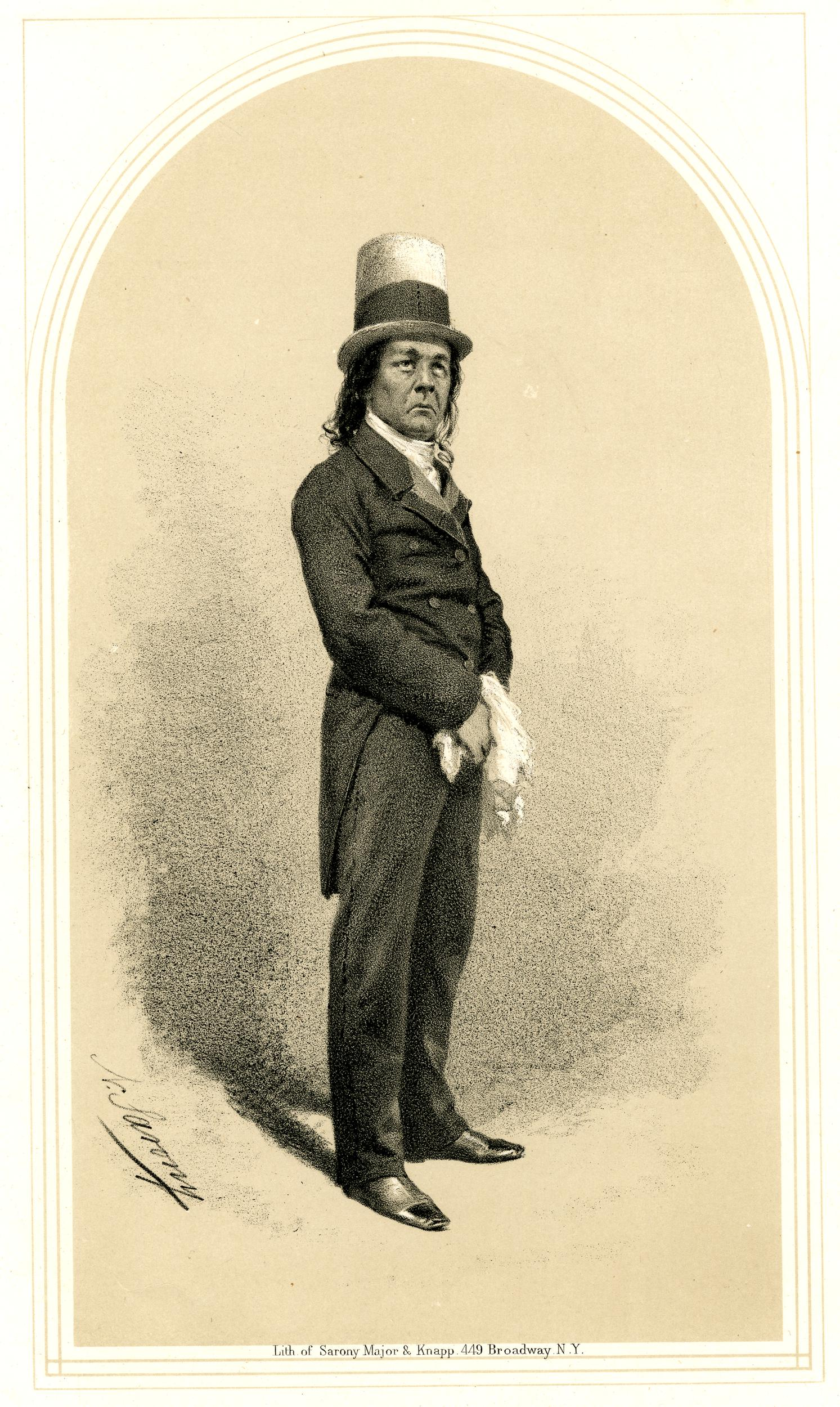
- Cowell as "Lord Lovell"
- Born: Samuel Houghton Cowell; 5 April 1820; London, England
- Died: 11 March 1864 (aged 43); Blandford Forum, Dorset, England
- Occupations: Actor, singer, comic entertainer
- Years active: 1829–1863

Samuel Houghton Cowell (5 April 1820 – 11 March 1864) was an actor and singer of comical songs. He was born in England and raised in the United States.

== Biography ==
Born in London, he was the son of Joseph Cowell, a British actor who took him to the United States in 1822. He was educated in a military academy near Philadelphia, and worked as a child actor in the United States. He first appeared there aged nine in Boston as Crack in The Turnpike Gate, a play by Thomas Knight, in which he sang a duet with his father "When off in curricle we go". Thereafter, he appeared at many major theatres in America, hailed as "the young American Roscius". He also appeared in Shakespeare plays, notably in the Comedy of Errors playing one of twin brothers, with his father playing the other.

At the age of 20, he returned to Britain, first to Edinburgh where he became a successful actor working for his uncle W. H. Murray, who managed the Theatre Royal and the Adelphi there. He also succeeded as a comic singer in entr'actes, and by the late 1840s concentrated entirely on singing. As his career developed, he became primarily a music hall artist, performing comical songs and burlesques in London song and supper rooms. Songs that he made famous included "The Ratcatcher's Daughter" and "Villikins and his Dinah".

Cowell became extremely popular and successful, and is credited with establishing the music hall, a new form of entertainment. He appeared twice before Queen Victoria at her court theatricals. According to music hall historian Harold Scott, Cowell was "a vividly remembered personality ... [who] ranks ... among the greatest exponents of entertainment."

He toured throughout England, staging a concert almost every night between 1857 and 1859. His schedule led to overwork, and to alcohol dependence. In 1860, he returned to America to tour, again with a very busy schedule. His health, previously robust, began to break down; his wife's diary described him at one point as "feeble as an infant ... merely skin and bone", but he continued to tour in the U.S. and Canada.

He developed consumption after his return to London in 1862. He continued to act in the provinces. Eventually his failing health made it impossible for him to continue performing and, in 1863, he was declared bankrupt. He moved with his family to stay with friends in Blandford Forum, Dorset, to recuperate.

Sam Cowell died in the following March and was buried in the cemetery at Blandford Forum, where there is a monument to him erected by his friends.

== Private life ==
He married Emilie Marguerite Ebsworth and they had eight children. Three of their children became actors: daughters Sydney (1846–1925) and Florence and son Joseph.
