= Villikins and his Dinah =

Song performed by Thomas Robson Brownhill

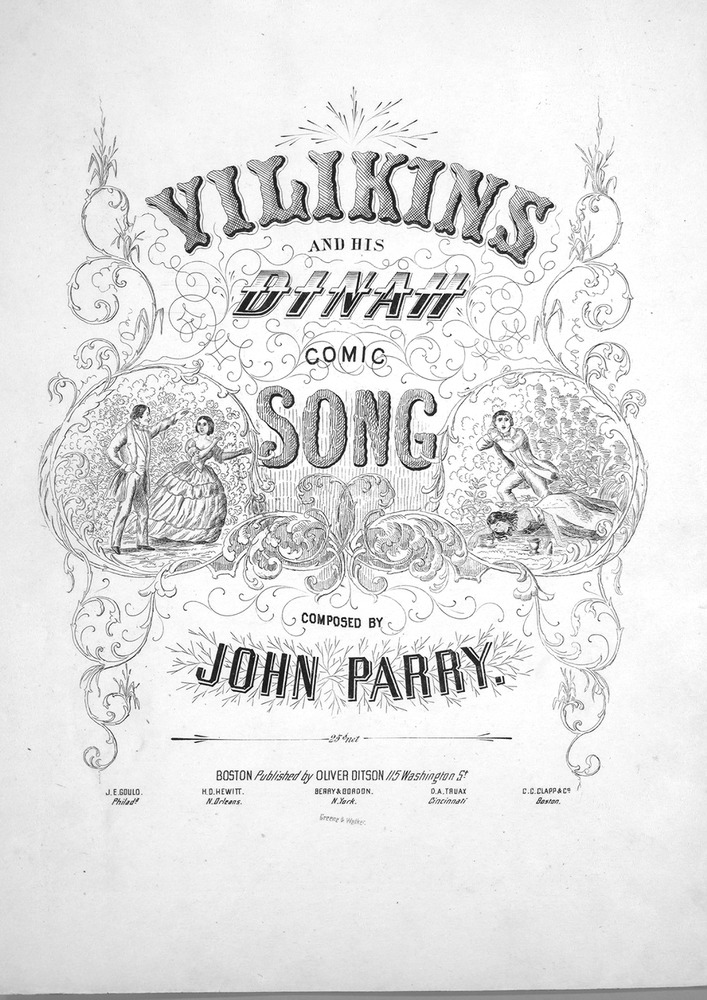
- Early sheet music cover

Song by Frederick Robson
- Published: 1853
- Composers: Unknown, sometimes attributed to "John Parry"
- Lyricists: Traditional with additions, possibly by E.L.Blanchard

"Villikins and his Dinah" (Laws M31A/B, Roud 271) is a stage song which emerged in England in 1853 as a burlesque version of a traditional ballad called "William and Dinah." Its great popularity led to the tune being later adopted for many other songs, such as "Sweet Betsy from Pike."

== Background ==
"Villikins and his Dinah" is based on "William and Dinah", a folk ballad extant from at least the early 19th century, which was still being sung and collected in the early 20th. The theme of the ballad is the traditional one of lovers parted by parental interference who then commit suicide and are buried in one grave.

"Villikins and his Dinah" was a parody of this. It became a major hit in 1853 when sung by actor Frederick Robson at London's Olympic Theatre in a revived one-act farce, The Wandering Minstrel. The comic version follows the traditional ballad closely but exaggerates its naivety and subverts its paths by telling the lovers' story in urban slang.

Burlesques of serious works were in great vogue on the London stage then, and the tragi-comic song became a sensation. The song was published in London by music sellers Campbell, Ransford, and Co. on 11 November 1853 and quickly followed by other editions with variants of words or music. Other theatres cashed in on the song's huge success by staging productions based on it - a farce, Villikins, and his Dinah opened at the Surrey theatre in February 1854, and a travesty by E.L.Blanchard and Sterling Coyne ran for two and a half months at the Haymarket. Its popularity grew when it was adopted by the Anglo-American entertainer Sam Cowell, who took it into a broader range of venues. From the theatres, it made its way to music halls and saloon bars, and by 1855, it was among the most popular songs of the day, played repeatedly on barrel organs in the streets. By then, the song had spread to Australia and North America.

== Melody ==
Musically, variations of the "Villikins and his Dinah" tune can be identified by the characteristics of their first few measures. They begin with an introductory tonic, which rises into an outline of the tonic's major triad and ends by repeating the fifth.

Although the tune of "Villikins" has been said to have given rise to more borrowings, imitations, and re-uses than almost any other in Anglo-American folk music, its origins are unclear. It may be the traditional melody to which "William and Dinah" were usually sung or a derivation, or it may have been specially composed for Robson's stage performance in 1853. In America, it was sometimes attributed to 'John Parry,' presumably either John Parry or his son John Orlando Parry. An early edition of "Villikins and his Dinah" published in Scotland in May 1854 gives the air it should be sung to as "They Died As They Lived."

In 1853, Robson entered a contract with a music publisher to whom he assigned sole rights to the lyrics and music; however, although the company threatened legal action against anyone infringing their copyright, both the tune and words were rapidly circulating in numerous editions.

== Lyrics ==
The lyrics are said to have been written by playwright E. L. Blanchard. A comparison with "William and Dinah" shows that they are adapted mainly from the traditional, but Robson performed the song with a series of comments and asides.

Although "Villikins and his Dinah" kept many of the original lyrics of "William and Dinah," it parodied its conventional phrasing and generally exploited its naivety for comic effect. It also put the words into the Cockney dialect, a lower-class London form of speech. In Cockney, the letter 'w' was pronounced as a 'v': the name 'William' therefore would become 'Villiam,' and for added bathos, the diminutive 'Villikins' ('Willikins') is used. The new lyrics emphasised other characteristics of uneducated speech such as double negatives, mispronunciations and malapropisms.

Other changes to the traditional lyrics included increasing the heroine's age from fourteen to sixteen, dropping the reference to her father as a 'liquor' merchant, and replacing the abusive phrase 'boldest strumpet' with 'boldest daughter'. An added final 'moral' verse inverts the sympathies of the original by warning girls not to defy their fathers, and young men to be cautious when falling in love.

"William and Dinah" (c.1819?)

It's of a liquor Merchant in London did dwell
He had but one child, a most beautiful girl.
Her name it was Dinah, scarce fourteen years old
She had a large portion in silver and gold

Besides a large portion when her mother did die
Which made many a sweetheart to love and draw nigh.
As Dinah was walking in the garden one day
Her father came to her and this he did say

Go Dinah and dress yourself in costly array
For I've met with a young man both gallant and gay
I've met with a man worth ten thousand a year
He says he will make you his bride and his dear,

O honoured father, I am but a child
And to marry so early I ne'er can abide,
O honoured dear father, I would freely give o'er
If you'd let me live single for three years or more.

Go, boldest strumpet, the father then replied.
Since you have denied me to be this man's bride
I'll give away thy portion to some heir of thy kin
You ne'er shall reap the benefit of one single pin.

Dinah wrote her love a letter with all haste and speed
And told her sweet William what her father had said,
Farewell my sweet William, for ever farewell
How dearly I loved you there is no tongue can tell

As William was walking the groves all around
He found his dear Dinah lay dead on the ground
With a cup of strong poison and a note lying by her side
'Twas my cruel father caused my death so nigh.'

He kissed her cold lips as she lay on the floor
And he called her his jewel ten thousand times o'er,
Then he drank up the poison like a lover so brave,
There's William and Dinah lie both in one grave.

"Villikins and his Dinah" (1854)

'Tis of a rich merchant who in London did dwell,
He had but one daughter, an unkimmon (uncommon) nice young gal(girl);
Her name it was Dinah, scarce sixteen years old,
With a very large fortune in silver & gold.

As Dinah was valiking (walking) the garding (garden) one day
Her papa he came to her, and thus did he say,
Go dress yourself Dinah, in gorgeous array
And take yourself a husiband both gallant and gay.

Oh, papa, Oh, papa, I've not made up my mind,
And to marry just yet, why I don't feel inclined,
To you my large fortune I'll gladly give o'er,
If you let me live single a year or two more.

Go go, boldest daughter the parent replied;
If you won't consent to be this here young man's bride,
I'll give your large fortune to the nearest of kin,
And you sha'n't reap the benefit of one single pin.

As Vilikins was valking the garden around
He espied his dear Dinah laying dead upon the ground.
And the cup of cold pison it lay by her side,
With a billet-dux a-stating 'twas by pison she died

He kiss'd her cold corpus a thousand times oe'r
And call'd her his Dinah, though she was no more
Then swallowed the pison, like a lovyer so brave
And Vilikins and his Dinah lie both in one grave.

MORAL

Now all you young maidens take a warning by her.
Never not by no means disobey your governor.
And all you young fellows mind who you clap eyes on,
Think of Vilikins and Dinah, and the cup of cold pison.

For stage performances, two added verses describe how Villikins and Dinah reappear as ghosts and haunt her father.

== Cultural influence ==
=== America ===
By March 1855, the song was already highly popular in New York.

Stephen Foster's version was used during the 1856 presidential election when three parties adopted the tune for their campaign songs, one being Foster's "The Great Baby Show."

It was also used for "Ballad of John Dean", a comic ballad based on a real-life event in New York, when the youngest daughter of wealthy liquor merchant John G. Boker eloped with her father's Irish coachman, John Dean, and was disinherited.

In 1860, "Sweet Betsy from Pike," using the "Villikins" tune but with fresh lyrics, was written by John A. Stone, a California-based songwriter. It was revived in the 1940s by the singer Burl Ives.

A song extolling American Civil War generals Sherman and Sheridan was also composed to the "Villikins" tune.

Helen Hartness Flanders collected a version of the song titled "Dinah's Lovers" in Rutland, Vermont, in 1930. It was sung by a seventh-generation Vermonter who had learned it from her grandmother, suggesting that the song or its source ballad had a longstanding tradition in the region.

=== Australia ===
George Selth Coppin, the 'father of Australian theatre', had an early hit with the song and the farce.

"Dinky di," a ballad sung by Australian soldiers in World War I, used the tune with new lyrics satirising non-combatant army staff.

=== Newfoundland ===
In 1869, it was used in Newfoundland's "The Anti-Confederation Song," a political protest song against the country joining Canada.

=== England ===
The song's great popularity was further boosted after it was adopted by Sam Cowell, an Anglo-American music hall artist who performed it successfully and became his signature piece.

At least two farces were written to exploit the popularity of the song, one by J. Stirling Coyne, Willikind and hys Dinah (1854), and one by Francis C. Burnand.

An illustrated book, The Pathetic Legend of Vilikins and Dinah, was published in April 1854.

At a state ball given by Queen Victoria at Buckingham Palace in June 1854, the band played a waltz version of "Villikins and his Dinah."

It was also played by the Guards band during the Siege of Sebastopol.

In Alice's Adventures in Wonderland by Lewis Carroll, Alice's fictional cat, Dinah is based on one of two real kittens, Willikins and Dinah, owned by Alice's namesake Alice Liddell and her brother Henry.

=== Ireland ===
In Ireland, the tune was used for two songs: The Old Orange Flute and Six Miles from Bangor to Donaghadee.

The Corrigan Brothers used the tune in their song There's No One as Irish as Barack O'Bama, which achieved international popularity.

=== Scotland ===
In Scotland, the tune was used for the song The Wee Magic Stane, which parodied the 1950 removal of the Stone of Scone.

== Recorded performances ==
Alfie Bass, the Cockney actor and comedian, made a 1960 recording of "Villikins and his Dinah," which includes much of the music hall patter that traditionally accompanied the performance.

Owen Brannigan and Ernest Lush cut the song for Songs You Know & Love, issued by EMI (MFP 1014). In addition, Kenneth McKellar recorded the song with slightly altered wording from the above.

Richard Dyer-Bennet performs the song on Volume 3 of his private label records, re-released by Smithsonian Folkways
