= Happy Days Are Here Again (film) =

- Directed by: Norman Lee
- Written by: F.H. Bickerton; Daniel Birt; Alan Rennie
- Story by: Renée Houston
- Produced by: John Argyle
- Starring: Renée Houston; Billie Houston; Shirley Houston
- Edited by: Daniel Birt
- Music by: Guy Jones
- Production company: John Argyle Productions
- Distributed by: Associated Producers & Distributors (AP&D)
- Release date: 10 August 1936
- Running time: 88 minutes
- Country: United Kingdom
- Language: English

Happy Days Are Here Again is a 1936 British musical drama film directed by Norman Lee and starring Renée Houston, Billie Houston and Shirley Houston. Its plot concerns a pair of sisters who have ambitions to take to the stage when they realise their parents' act is finished. It was also known as Stage Folk and Variety Follies.

== Cast ==
- Renée Houston as Kitty Seymour
- Billie Houston as Mickey Seymour
- Shirley Houston as Nita
- Harry Milton as Chris
- Billy Watts as Reg Jarvis
- George Harris as Brainwave
- Viola Compton as Lil Grayson
- Sally McBride as Ella
- Mark Stone as Alf
- Ida Barr as Girlie
