= Frederick Robson =

English comedian, actor, and ballad singer

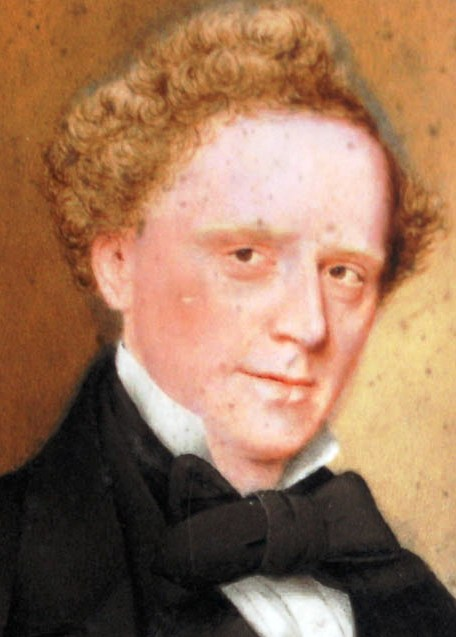
- Born: 22 February 1821; Margate, Kent, England
- Died: 12 August 1864 (aged 43); 19 Ampthill Square, London, England
- Occupations: Actor, comedian, theatre manager
- Years active: 1842–1864
- Spouse: Rosetta Frances May (m. 1842)
- Children: Frederick Robson (actor), 1 daughter

Frederick Robson, born Thomas Frederick Brownbill (22 February 1821 – 12 August 1864) was an English comedian, actor and ballad singer. During his acting career, he combined outstanding comic gifts with the power of moving an audience to a sense of tragedy or pathos. Although Robson's career spanned more than two decades, the period of his greatest success was at the Olympic Theatre, beginning in 1853 and lasting only a few years.

== Early life ==
Robson was born in Margate as Thomas Brownbill, son of Philip Brownbill and his wife Margaret. Philip Brownbill is described on his son's wedding certificate in 1842 as 'deceased, stockbroker' and appears to have died early, as no allusion to him by his son has survived.

In November 1828 the young Robson went with his mother to London, possibly to visit relations. He was deeply impressed by the performances he saw there at the Coburg Theatre, in a week when the bill included both plays and comic songs. While still a boy he later took part in amateur theatricals, with his mother's encouragement: the actor Walter Lacy recalled seeing him play the title role in Richard III in a juvenile performance at Mile End Assembly Rooms. By this time Robson and his mother may have settled in London, as they were certainly living there in 1836, when he was apprenticed to a copperplate-engraver near the Strand. Although his apprenticeship was not fully served out, due to the early retirement of his master, Robson was skilled enough to set up in business for himself, and according to one source was 'a seal engraver of considerable talent'. By this time he had also earned a reputation among colleagues as a flamboyant and idiosyncratic character. He was also a clever mimic, and his interest in the stage was growing. On 12 May 1842 he bought a part and appeared as Simon Mealbag in Grace Huntley at a small theatre off the Strand. He was not a success: nevertheless he gave up his engraving business and began to try to break into acting.

== Early career ==
According to one source Robson's first professional engagement was late in 1842 at Whitstable: another suggests he may have begun at a London tavern-cum-concert hall, the Bower Saloon, where he began developing his repertoire as a comic singer. He still described himself as engraver, however, when on 21 September 1842 he married Rosetta Frances May, a woman with theatrical connections, in Lambeth. He signed the marriage register as Thomas Frederick Brownbill, beginning the change to his stage name. Shortly thereafter Robson began work as a strolling player in the provinces, a precarious existence but a recognised method of learning his craft before attempting to work in the London theatres. His first earnings were meagre, about five shillings per week in Whitstable, and he faced frequent privation. After some eighteen months in the provinces, in February 1844 he won an engagement at the Grecian Saloon, City Road, London, where he began his climb to success. The entertainment provided at the Grecian varied from Shakespearean drama to ballet to comedy song solos, and, while there, Robson considerably extended his range, appearing in everything from The Merchant of Venice (as Shylock) to a blackface comedy sketch, More Ethiopians.

== Ireland ==
The engagement at the Grecian gave Robson varied experience, but though the venue presented plays, its theatrical standing (and that of its performers) was tainted by its downmarket past as a saloon. In 1850 Irish theatre manager John Harris offered Robson an engagement, and he moved to Dublin, acting first at the Queen's Theatre and later, after Harris himself had moved, at the Theatre Royal. Over the next three years he played some 150 parts, including some in Shakespeare, and was popular enough twice to put on his own one-man show, Seeing Robson. Early in 1853, however, occurred an incident in which during a performance Robson appeared to insult the Roman Catholic faith by a slighting reference to a priest. According to one report it was an unfortunate slip of the tongue; according to another the result of a bet. The Irish audience identified closely with the Catholic church, and any slur on it was an insult to them. Robson did not appear at all for two weeks during January 1853, and although he then played till the end of the season, appearing last on 12 March 1853, he left shortly after for London.

== The 'Olympic' and stardom ==
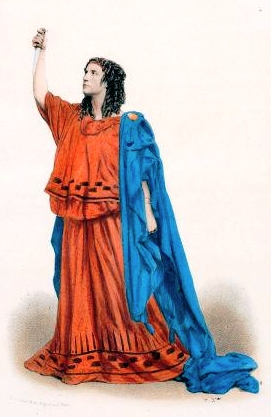
Ristori as Medea

Later in March 1853, Robson was offered an engagement at the Olympic Theatre in London under the management of old-school actor William Farren. In the first piece Robson did not seem to connect with his audience, but in the short farce which followed he introduced a comic song he had sung already at the Grecian, The Country Fair, which allowed him to improvise characters and introduce comic business. "That's very good: he's an actor!" was his manager's satisfied verdict, and Robson's place was assured. By April his performance of the song was being advertised on the bill separately in bold type.

On 25 April, Robson took the lead in a burlesque version of Macbeth, a freewheeling adaptation that poked fun at the solemn and scholarly productions of Shakespeare offered by the likes of Charles Kean, while also including as many popular American minstrel songs as it could. Reviewers were impressed, commenting that Robson's Macbeth was more than a simple caricature: "His peculiarity is that he really seems to be aware of the tragic foundation which lies at the bottom of the grotesque superstructure".

Then on 23 May 1853 Robson appeared in a revived one-act farce called The Wandering Minstrel playing Jem Bags, a bedraggled Cockney street-singer. He produced a realistic portrayal which astonished and delighted his audience with its originality, but which may have owed something to personal experience. His culminating song, Villikins and his Dinah, quickly became the rage of the season and within two years was known throughout the English-speaking world, reaching Australia and America.

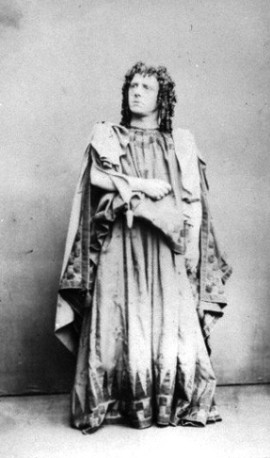
Robson as Ristori as Medea

Robson's talent for burlesque came to the fore again in Shylock, or The Merchant of Venice Preserv'd in which, playing the title role, he again produced the unsettling effect of veering from comedy to tragedy and back within a single speech. His most memorable performance in burlesque was as Medea, in which he parodied the strongly-emotional, gestural acting of the Italian star Adelaide Ristori in the same role. Between the laughs, however, he also made his audience shiver at the sheer desperation of an abandoned wife. Dickens, who saw both, preferred Robson – not for his comedy, but because he found him more moving in the tragic passages, writing: "[T]he extraordinary power of his performance ... points to the badness of Ristori's acting in a singular way by bringing out what she might do, and does not. The scene with Jason is perfectly terrific. ... He has a frantic song and dagger dance, about 10 minutes long altogether, which has more passion in it than Ristori could express in 50 years."

Ristori herself came to see his version on its opening night, and Robson, who suffered badly from stage fright, was so disconcerted he forgot his lines and was unable to go on: he was saved only by the presence of mind of the little girl playing his stage 'son', who cued his first lines.

Other roles in which Robson excelled included the sinister Desmarets in Plot and Passion,(1853) the malevolent spirit Gam-Bogie in The Yellow Dwarf(1854) and deformed Prince Richcraft in a fairy extravaganza, The Discreet Princess(1855). Henry James, who as a child saw him in the latter role, never forgot it: "I still see Robson slide across the stage, in one sidelong wriggle, as the small black sinister Prince Richcraft of the Fairy Tale; everything he did at once very dreadful and very droll, thoroughly true and yet nonetheless macabre..." Thackeray, who saw him in The Yellow Dwarf, was astonished to find himself at one point almost in tears at a burlesque.

Barely five feet tall, with small hands and feet but a large head, Robson made brilliant use of a physique which lent itself easily to comedy or the grotesque. Despite his physical oddities however critics suggested from early in his career that he could develop into a powerful tragic actor if he chose but he never did so, usually playing parts in which he could make the lightning transitions between humour and pathos which caused one admiring critic to exclaim 'Mr Robson is not a star - he is a meteor.' Sir Henry Irving's verdict was that Robson was '...a good actor, but not great - yes, yes, he was great. He was great enough to know he could only be great for three minutes.'

During his years of fame Robson was the established star of the Olympic, eventually becoming one of its managers. His admirers included not only literary men such as Dickens and Thackeray but also royalty: Queen Victoria and Prince Albert were keen fans, inviting him to Windsor for many royal command performances and asking for The Yellow Dwarf in particular five times.

== Decline and death ==
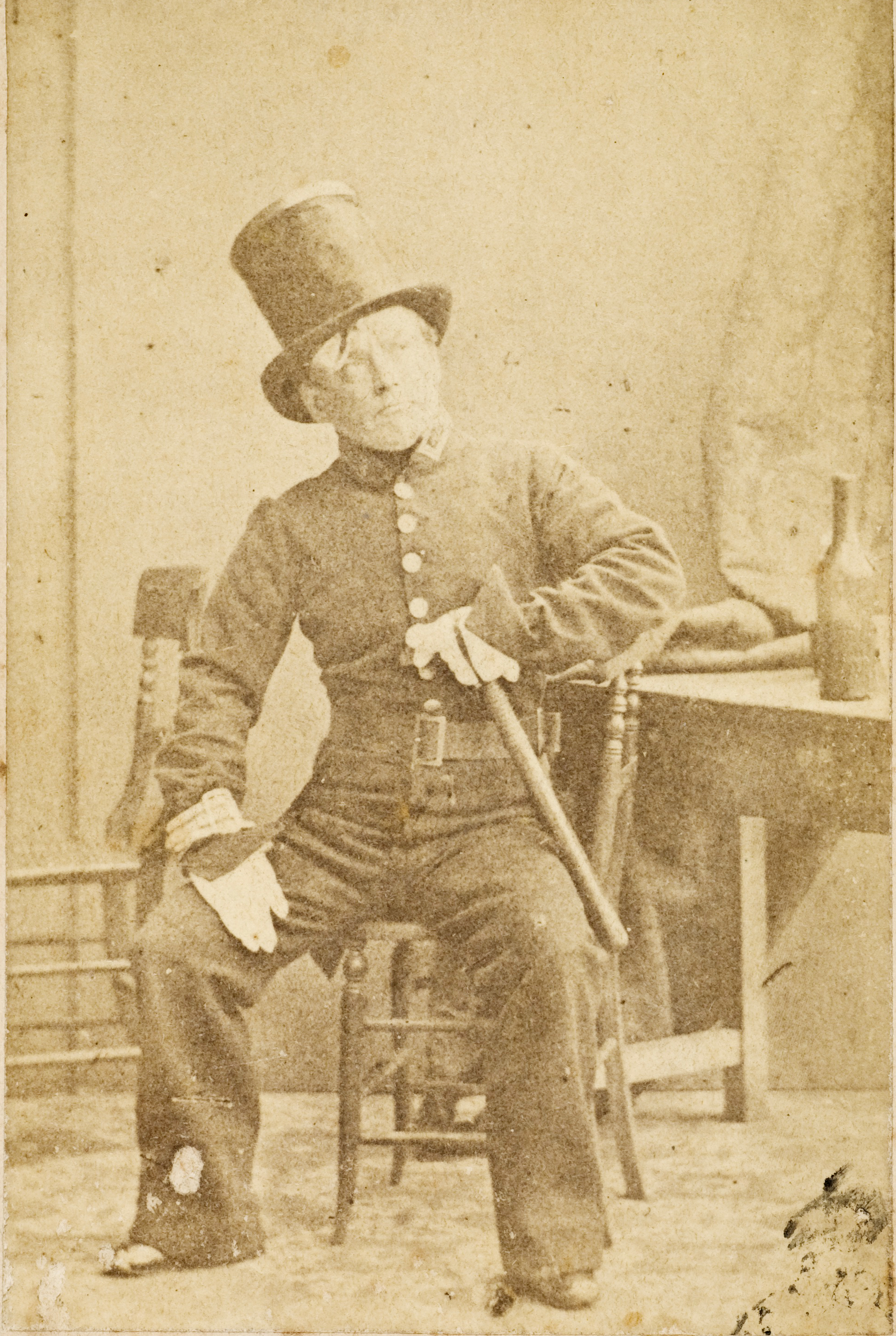
Studio portrait of (Thomas) Frederick Robson dressed as an English police sergeant, after Camille Silvy, 1859

Robson, an anxious and retiring man in private life, had always suffered badly from stage fright, and drank heavily to overcome it. In the summer of 1861 his memory began to fail him, and he did not perform for a month. He later returned to the Olympic and was received by his audience with great warmth, but by then he was suffering blackouts and though he sometimes rallied, by late 1862 he could no longer be relied on. He last appeared at the Olympic on 4 April 1862. Despite his undertaking a long provincial tour, Robson's steep decline was evident. In 1863 Robson appeared with his son Frederick jnr at the Queen's Theatre, Dublin. They were both billed in Boots at the Swan on 4 July.

Robson returned to London seriously ill and died at his home at 19 Ampthill Square on 12 August 1864, of kidney and heart disease. Obituaries in the newspapers were affectionate: his funeral was attended by the entire staff of the Olympic, and the theatre was closed that day as a mark of respect. Robson was buried at Norwood Cemetery, but by 1971 his memorial had disintegrated, and the exact position of his grave is now not known.

== Personal life ==
In 1842 Robson married Rosetta Frances May, by whom he had a son, Frederick Henry Robson (1843–1919) also an actor and a daughter, Frances (1846). His early career was characterised by low earnings and long absences however, and his marriage came under strain. Some time after the birth of their second child in 1846 the couple appear to have separated, as Rosetta and the two children did not accompany Robson when he went to Ireland. But the family seems not to have been entirely estranged: young Frederick later recalled visiting his grandmother while his father was in Ireland, and once he achieved success at the Olympic Robson brought both children, although not his wife, to live with him. While separated both Robson and his wife seem to have formed other attachments: early in 1861 the actor was living at 19 Ampthill Square with a Mrs Sarah Emma Manly, who appears on the census return as 'Mrs Robson'. Very shortly after this however Mrs Manly departed and Rosetta Robson returned, as a result of efforts by the eldest son, Frederick, to reconcile his parents. Rosetta remained with Robson thereafter until his death.

Some year or so after Rosetta returned she brought a boy about eight, referred to as her nephew Edwin May, to live at the family home. In 1879 she declared that he was her legitimate son by her husband, stating that Robson had visited her at times during their separation and on one of these occasions Edwin was conceived, although his birth had not been registered. Testimony of other witnesses however suggests Robson did not accept paternity.

Robson's mother, Margaret Brownbill, survived her son by fifteen years. Like his children she too had adopted his stage name, and when she died her death was registered as that of 'Margaret Robson'. She was buried beside him at Norwood cemetery.
