= The Old Orange Flute =

Irish folk song

The Old Orange Flute (also spelt Auld Orange Flute) is a folk song originating in Ireland. It is often associated with the Orange Order. Despite this, its humour ensured a certain amount of cross-community appeal, especially in the period before the commencement of The Troubles in the late 1960s, and it has also been recorded by artists better-known for songs associated with Irish Nationalism, such as The Clancy Brothers & Tommy Makem and The Dubliners.

== History ==
The tune itself, often referred to as Villikins and his Dinah after a music hall song of the 1850s (and known in America as Sweet Betsy from Pike), has been used with many variations for a large number of folk songs and sea shanties, and has been called the "primal tune". Related fiddle tunes are found as early as the 18th century. The Old Orange Flute, however, originated more recently, probably in the 19th century, when a variant of the tune was used to set an anonymously authored broadside.

The earliest known records of the words appeared in 1907 in two books: A Collection of Orange and Protestant Songs and The golden treasury of Irish songs and lyrics. The latter, published in New York, classifies the song as "Anonymous street ballad".

Several books attribute authorship of the words to one Nugent Bohem, but this is a misreading of the title of a book containing the song from the Dublin publisher Nugent & Co: "Nugent's Bohemian Songster".

It has been claimed that the words were written by a nationalist as a parody of Orangeism and were first published in the nationalist journal Sinn Fein on 2 November 1912. This is clearly refuted by the existence of the two books from 1907. The publication in Sinn Fein, under the title The Magic Flute, carries no explanation but a facetious attribution to Edward Carson, the unionist politician.

== Text ==
The song tells the story of Bob Williamson, a weaver of Dungannon, who is considered a "stout Orange blade" by his associates. However, "he married a Papist named Brigid McGinn. Turned Papish himself, he forsook the auld cause" and was compelled to flee to Connacht, taking with him his flute. Enrolled into a Catholic church choir, he finds that the flute will only play Protestant songs such as The Boyne Water. Eventually the priest buys him a new instrument and the flute is condemned to be burned for heresy, though in the flames a "quare noise" can be heard as the flute still whistles "The Protestant Boys". The text was reproduced in Colm Ó Lochlainn's Irish Street Ballads (1939).

Modern renditions of the song often include the repeated refrain "Sure it's six miles from Bangor to Donaghadee". This seems to have been popularised by versions by The Clancy Brothers and subsequently The Dubliners; the line is taken from the refrain (and title) of another folk song, Six Miles from Bangor to Donaghadee, describing a series of absurd episodes and also set to the tune Villikins, and which was recorded by the Larne-reared but Southport-born singer Richard Hayward, amongst others. Hayward also made the first recording of The Old Orange Flute, in around 1920.

Denis Johnston quotes the first and last verses of the song in his war memoir Nine Rivers from Jordan, giving two alternate choruses:

"Tooraloo! Tooralay! We'll have no superstition round Portadown way!"

"Tooraloo! Tooralay! Oh, the twelfth of July is the Orangeman's day."

== In popular culture ==
In the 1996 adventure film The Ghost and the Darkness Val Kilmer portrays Irish Unionist hero John Henry Patterson and sings the song whilst lying in wait for a pair of man-eating lions.
