= Lennox Pawle =

English actor (1872–1936)

Pawle in 1908

Lennox Pawle (27 April 1872, in Marylebone, Middlesex – 22 February 1936, in Los Angeles, California) was an English stage and film actor.

== Life and career ==
John Lennox Pawle was born in Marylebone, London, on 27 April 1872, the son of John Christopher Pawle, a London solicitor, and his wife, Maria. Before becoming an actor Pawle worked as a newspaper reporter; later he began his acting career at Sarah Thorne’s Dramatic School. The heavyset actor gained experience in London, where before the turn of the century he was already known as a comic actor and eventually became a member of Maude Adams's Playhouse company. Pawle arrived in America in 1910 and worked at the Broadway Theatre, where he acted in five plays. He married Dorothy Parker when they returned to England in 1914. It was Pawle’s second (possibly third) marriage after being granted a divorce from Janet Mary Pawle in 1909. Lennox Pawle remained in England during the years of the First World War but returned to Broadway in 1919 to play in Messager's operetta Monsieur Beaucaire. He also appeared in some silent films.

Pawle remained busy on Broadway throughout the 1920s and made his return to movies in 1929. He played in a handful of Hollywood films during the 1930s and is possibly best known to modern audiences for one of his final movie roles as Mr. Dick in George Cukor's literature adaption David Copperfield (1935). Lennox Pawle died in Los Angeles in February, 1936 at the age of 63, one year after the film was released.

== Filmography ==
Year	Title	Role	Notes
1918	The Admirable Crichton	Lord Loam	
1918	All the Sad World Needs	George Grover	
1920	The Temptress	Perkins	
1922	The Glorious Adventure	Samuel Pepys	
1929	Married in Hollywood	King Alexander	
1929	The Sky Hawk	Lord Bardell	
1929	Hot for Paris	Mr. Pratt	
1931	The Sin of Madelon Claudet	St. Jacques	
1931	Mata Hari	DiSignac	Uncredited
1935	David Copperfield	Mr. Dick	
1935	The Gay Deception	Consul-General	
1935	Sylvia Scarlett	Drunk	Uncredited, (final film role)
