= David Copperfield (1935 film) =

1935 film by George Cukor

- 1935 US theatrical poster
- Directed by: George Cukor
- Written by: Hugh Walpole (adaptation)
- Screenplay by: Howard Estabrook; Lenore J. Coffee (uncredited)
- Based on: David Copperfield; 1850 novel by Charles Dickens
- Produced by: David O. Selznick
- Starring: W. C. Fields; Freddie Bartholomew; Lionel Barrymore; Madge Evans; Maureen O'Sullivan; Edna May Oliver; Lewis Stone; Frank Lawton; Elizabeth Allan; Roland Young
- Cinematography: Oliver T. Marsh
- Edited by: Robert J. Kern
- Music by: Herbert Stothart; William Axt (uncredited)
- Production company: Metro-Goldwyn-Mayer
- Distributed by: Loew's Inc.
- Release date: January 18, 1935 (US)
- Running time: 129 or 133 minutes
- Country: United States
- Language: English
- Budget: $1,073,000
- Box office: $3,064,000 (worldwide rentals)

David Copperfield is a 1935 American film released by Metro-Goldwyn-Mayer based upon Charles Dickens' 1850 novel The Personal History, Adventures, Experience, & Observation of David Copperfield the Younger (though a number of characters and incidents from the novel were omitted).

The story was adapted by Hugh Walpole from the Dickens novel, and the film was directed by George Cukor from a screenplay by Howard Estabrook (and the uncredited Lenore J. Coffee).

The novel was adapted for three silent film versions prior to this, the first sound production.

== Plot ==
David's father dies before his birth and therefore the young man is forced to spend his childhood without the presence of a father figure. He finds valid support in his mother and housekeeper Peggotty. David's mother, however, feels the need to have a husband and therefore marries Mr. Murdstone, a severe and insensitive man, and welcomes his sister into the house; she proves to be even more insensitive than her brother.

When David's mother dies, Murdstone sends David to London to work in his family's wine bottling plant. During this time he is assisted by the Micawber family and forms a close friendship with its members. Mr. Micawber, with his courtly language and with his head a little in the air, is unable to look after the expenses of the house and gets into debt. David decides to visit his great-aunt Betsey Trotwood in Dover, which is 72 miles away. Robbed of his money and possessions, David is forced to make the arduous trek on foot. His aunt welcomes him together with her roommate Mr. Dick and they send him to boarding school in Canterbury, where he rents a room with the lawyer Wickfield and forms a sincere friendship with Wickfield's daughter, Agnes.

David meets Dora Spenlow at the ballet and falls in love, eventually marrying her. Dora is young and flighty, and inept at running a household, and dies not long after their marriage. David and Micawber then help to unmask Uriah Heep as the forger and cheat that he is and return Wickfield's firm to its rightful owner. David and Agnes end the film finally expressing their love for each other.

== Cast ==
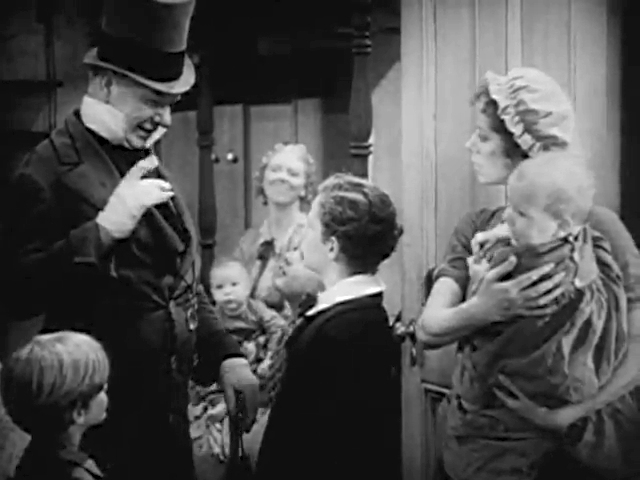
Mr. Micawber (W. C. Fields) addresses young David Copperfield (Freddie Bartholomew).

(in order of appearance)

- Edna May Oliver as Betsey Trotwood
- Elizabeth Allan as Clara Copperfield
- Jessie Ralph as Clara Peggotty
- Harry Beresford as Dr. Chillip
- Freddie Bartholomew as David Copperfield as a boy
- Basil Rathbone as Edward Murdstone
- Hugh Walpole as the vicar
- Herbert Mundin as Barkis, coachman
- John Buckler as Ham Peggotty
- Fay Chaldecott as Little Em'ly as a child
- Una O'Connor as Mrs. Gummidge
- Lionel Barrymore as Dan'l Peggotty
- Violet Kemble Cooper as Jane Murdstone
- Arthur Treacher as Thief with Donkey (uncredited)
- Elsa Lanchester as Clickett, Micawber's maid
- Jean Cadell as Emma Micawber
- W. C. Fields as Wilkins Micawber
- Lennox Pawle as Mr. Dick
- Renee Gadd as Janet, Aunt Betsey's maid
- Marilyn Knowlden as Agnes Wickfield as a child
- Lewis Stone as Mr. Wickfield
- Roland Young as Uriah Heep
- Frank Lawton as David Copperfield as a young man
- Madge Evans as Agnes Wickfield as a woman
- Hugh Williams as James Steerforth
- Maureen O'Sullivan as Dora Spenlow
- Florine McKinney as Little Em'ly as a woman
- Ivan F. Simpson as Littimer, Steerforth's servant
- Mabel Colcord as Mary Ann

== Production ==
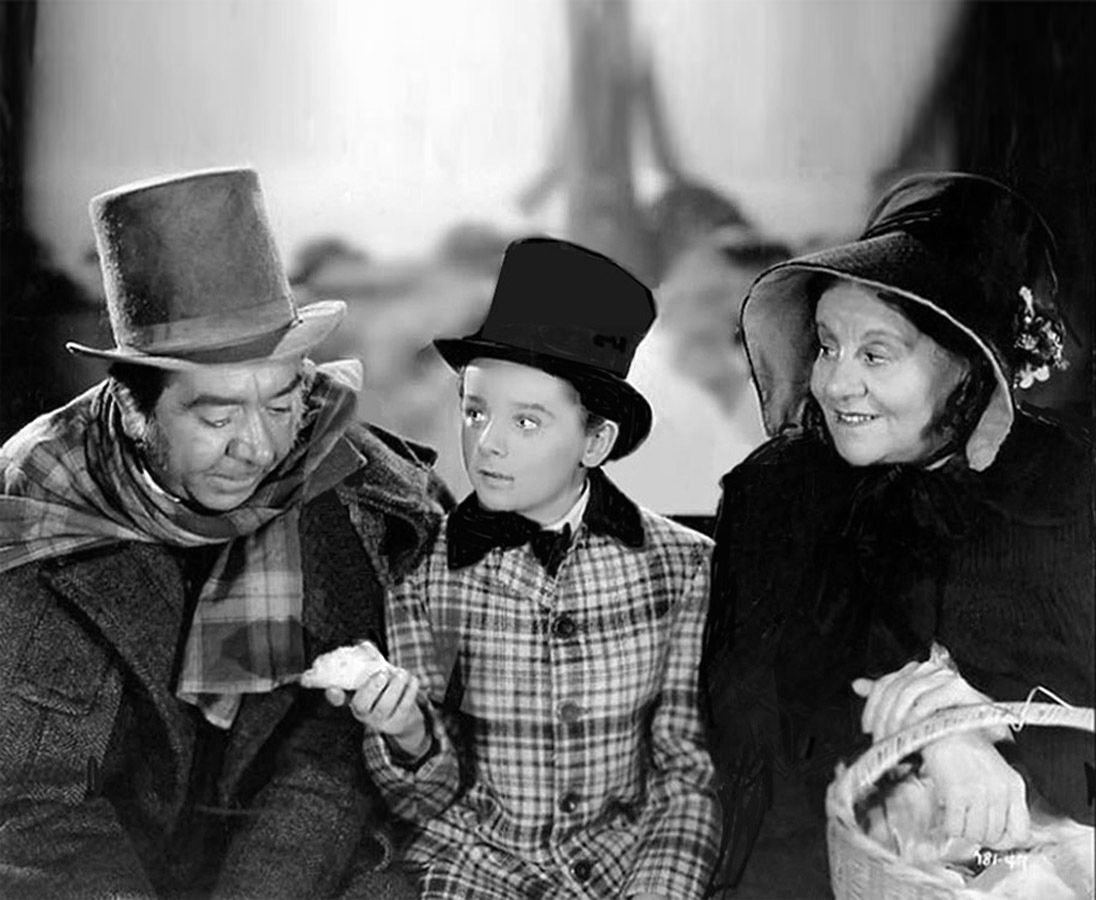
Herbert Mundin, Freddie Bartholomew and Jessie Ralph in David Copperfield

David O. Selznick dearly wanted to film David Copperfield, as his Russian father, Lewis J. Selznick, had learned English through it, and read it to his sons every night. After failing to dissuade Selznick from the project, Louis B. Mayer, his father-in-law and employer, agreed that MGM would underwrite the production provided his contract child star Jackie Cooper was cast in the role of the young David. Selznick fought to remain true to the novel's origins and, after an extensive talent search in Canada and Great Britain by Selznick and George Cukor, the role went to the British Freddie Bartholomew.

Cedric Gibbons designed a recreation of 19th-century London on the MGM backlot. The scenes set outside Aunt Betsey's house atop the white cliffs of Dover were filmed at Malibu. MGM even filmed the exterior of Canterbury Cathedral, which only appears in the film for less than a minute. Special effects, including many matte shots, were by Slavko Vorkapić.

Charles Laughton was originally cast in the role of Mr. Micawber, and was authentically made up with a bald cap, since Dickens describes the character as hairless. After two days' work, he disliked his performance in the dailies and asked to be replaced. Selznick released Laughton, with the project five weeks into production.

"Billed as a super-production, it had all the earmarks of super-flop," reported Silver Screen in 1935: "Cukor decided, 'We must have a good utility man to build the picture up. Someone who can be depended upon to give a surefire performance.'" Laughton recommended comedian and Dickens aficionado W. C. Fields for the part. This proved a wise suggestion. Silver Screen columnist Jeanne De Kolty continued, "Fields is a trouper -- one of the best on the screen today. He always gives a first-class performance. His name will sell pictures in small towns where new stars may not be known. Chances are even a poor film will make money if it can boast of Fields in the cast."

A clause in Fields's contract stated that he had to play the part with a British accent, but he had difficulty learning the character's florid dialogue and had to read off cue cards. He thus speaks in his own voice, without any affected accent. His defense: "My father was an Englishman and I inherited this accent from him! Are you trying to go against nature?" This is the only film where Fields does not ad lib, and he plays the character in a straightforward manner (although he did want to add his juggling specialty; when this was denied, he wanted to add one of his familiar anecdotes about snakes, which was also denied). Director George Cukor said that when Fields did make a suggestion for a visual bit, such as accidentally dipping his quill in a teacup instead of an inkwell, it was always within the parameters of the character. The result was one of the finest performances of that year.

== Reception ==
The film was well-received upon its release in January 1935. Andre Sennwald of The New York Times called it "the most profoundly satisfying screen manipulation of a great novel the camera has ever given us." Variety wrote that it had "one of the most evenly good casts ever to have been assembled", with staging and costumes that were "almost always excellent." John Mosher of The New Yorker found the first half of the film "one of the superb things of the movies" and the second half more conventional, though "all of it is good." Mosher also praised the casting and opined that Freddie Bartholemew put on "one of the prettiest performances ever given on the screen by a youngster." David Copperfield topped the Film Daily year-end poll of 451 critics around the country as the best film of 1935.

Gus McCarthy of Motion Picture Herald advised exhibitors: "Primarily the show is a prestige feature, presentation of which should assume the status of an extraordinary event. While being of that quality it is also smash entertainment with a powerful all-audience appeal. This screen version is actually so much an educational feature (while being thrilling in entertainment) that seeing it practically becomes a duty. The picture is the book. It commands the respect and support of everyone interested in the cause of sincere, elevating entertainment, to be sold with a dignity that completely emphasizes the worth of all its elements." Motion Picture Reviews wrote, "If Charles Dickens himself had supervised every rehearsal, it is doubtful if the book could have come to life more authentically than it does in the film version of David Copperfield. If it seems a little long, one must remember that it is a long book, and there is not a person or a scene one would wish to have deleted." Trade publisher Pete Harrison called the film "Excellent! One does not have to be a lover of Dickens's works to enjoy David Copperfield; it is a picture that will undoubtedly entertain everybody. The first half is more enjoyable than the second; this is owed mainly to the marvelous acting of Freddie Bartholomew. The boy's anguish is heartbreaking. But not only is he superb, he is also impressive whenever he appears. The letdown in the second half is caused by the fact that one misses Freddie."

== Recognition ==
David Copperfield was nominated for three Academy Awards, including Academy Award for Best Picture, Best Film Editing (Robert J. Kern), and Best Assistant Director (Joseph M. Newman), and was nominated for the Mussolini Cup for Best Foreign Film at the Venice Film Festival (losing out to Anna Karenina).

It was the 20th most popular film at the British box office in 1935-1936 after Modern Times, Lives of a Bengal Lancer, Mutiny on the Bounty, Top Hat, The Great Ziegfeld, The Scarlet Pimpernel, Mr Deeds Goes to Town, Show Boat, The Iron Duke, Love Me Forever, Sanders of the River, Dark Angel, The Ghost Goes West, Follow the Fleet, Swing Time, Things to Come, The 39 Steps, Clive of India, and Escape Me Never.

There were several notable differences in the film from the book. For instance, in the film David never attends Salem House boarding school, and so the characters he met there do not appear, with the exception of Steerforth, who is instead introduced as head boy of the school David attends after going to live with Betsey Trotwood.

It is shown in many countries on television at Christmas. It is rated with four out of four stars every year in Halliwell's Film Guide.

This was selected by The New York Times as one of the 1000 greatest movies ever made.

The film is referred to in the Dad's Army episode "The Deadly Attachment".

== Box office ==
According to MGM records the film earned $2,969,000 at the box office worldwide and made a profit of $686,000. It earned an additional $95,000 from a reissue in 1937–1938.

== See also ==
- Lionel Barrymore filmography
