= Viola Compton =

English actress (1886–1971)

- Born: Viola Maud Compton–Mackenzie; 26 November 1886; Fulham, London, England, UK
- Died: 7 April 1971 (aged 84); Birchington-on-Sea, Kent, England, UK
- Occupation: Film actress
- Years active: 1917–1938

Viola Maud Compton–Mackenzie (26 November 1886 – 7 April 1971), known as Viola Compton, was an English film actress. Born in Fulham, London, she was the second of three siblings born to the actors Edward Compton and Virginia Frances Bateman. Her younger brother was writer Compton Mackenzie and her younger sister was actress Fay Compton. She died in Birchington-on-Sea, Kent.

== Partial filmography ==
- Polly of the Circus (1917)
- Compromising Daphne (1930)
- The Black Hand Gang (1930)
- Third Time Lucky (1931)
- Looking on the Bright Side (1932)
- Smithy (1933)
- The Good Companions (1933)
- Excess Baggage (1933)
- The Shadow (1933)
- The Medicine Man (1933)
- Dark World (1935)
- Find the Lady (1936)
- Happy Days Are Here Again (1936)
- Servants All (1936 short)
- The Last Journey (1936)
- The Man in the Mirror (1936)
- The Big Noise (1936)
