= Joseph Cowell =

English actor, author and painter

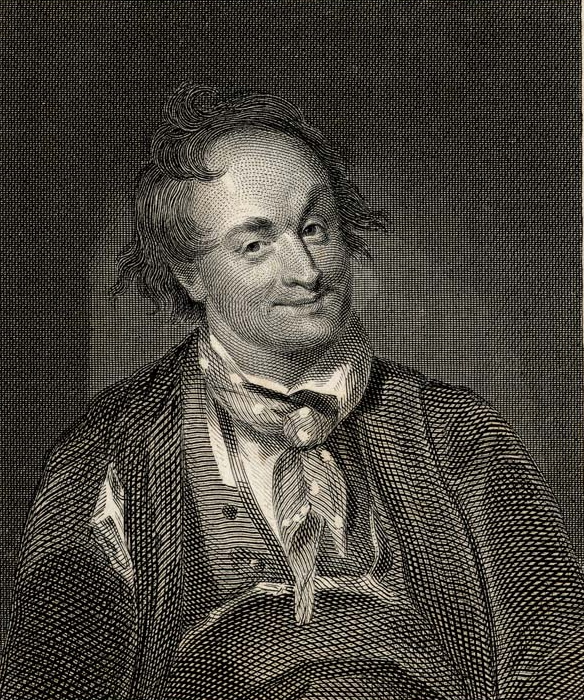
- Joseph Cowell in 1826
- Born: Joseph Leathley Hawkins-Witshed; 7 August 1792
- Died: 13 November 1863 (aged 71)
- Occupation: Actor

Joseph Leathley Cowell (né Hawkins-Witshed; 7 August 1792 – 13 November 1863) was an English actor, writer, and painter.

== Early life ==
Cowell was born Joseph Leathley Hawkins-Witshed not far from Torquay in Devon. His father had been a colonel in the army, and his uncle was Admiral James Hawkins-Whitshed.

Cowell entered the navy at the age of 13, served three years as a midshipman, and then embarked on a year-long cruise to the West Indies. In a quarrel, he struck a superior officer, thus rendering himself liable to a court-martial, with the probability of being shot. On the voyage home, his ship encountered a French ship and he begged to be allowed to lose his life honorably in action. He did his duty so bravely that on arriving at Plymouth, the admiral obtained his antedated discharge by way of the sick list. These events prompted Cowell to change his surname.

== Acting career ==
Cowell became interested in acting during one of his naval leaves. He later recounted how when he first saw Hamlet performed, he interrupted the ghost by shouting "That's the man who nailed up the flags," and he startled Hamlet by suggesting, "If I were you I'd go to sea!"

In 1812, he wrote to George Sandford at the Plymouth Theatre, saying that he wished to become an actor. He was hired and made his first appearance less than two weeks later as Belcour in Richard Cumberland's The West Indian. This was followed by regular engagements acting alongside such performers as Dorothea Jordan and Charles Mayne Young. He performed in both tragedy and comedy but preferred the latter. One of Cowell's best-known comic roles was as Crack in The Turnpike Gate.

The theatrical manager Stephen Kemble offered Cowell an engagement at the Theatre Royal, Drury Lane, where he opened as Samson Rawbold in Colman's The Iron Chest and Nicholas in the Midnight Hour. On the death of Queen Charlotte in 1818, theatres were closed. To tide himself over, Cowell composed and acted in a three-hour olio entitled Cowell Alone; or, a Trip to London, which he toured in the area of Lincoln. On his return to London, he joined the Adelphi Theatre for a three years' engagement. He later performed at Astley's Theatre.

In 1821, the American manager Stephen Price arranged an American tour that began at the Park Theatre, New York, where he performed in The Foundling of the Forest and as Crack in The Turnpike Gate.

In 1844, he wrote a memoir, Thirty years passed among the players in England and America, that was issued in two parts.

He died in 1863 and was buried in Brompton Cemetery, near London. A stone was erected by his son-in-law, H. L. Bateman.

== Painting ==
Cowell was also a painter who started out painting portraits. He worked at times as a scene painter at Covent Garden and elsewhere.

== Personal life ==
Cowell's first wife was Maria Murray, older sister of the Scottish actor and theatre manager Harriet Murray. Their children included Joseph Cowell, a scene painter who died in early adulthood, actor William Cowell, Sam Cowell, and Maria Cowell, who died at the age of five.

His second wife was Frances Sheppard, by whom he was the father of Sidney Frances Bateman, a theatrical manager, playwright, and actor.

His third wife was Harriet Burke, whom he married in 1848.

== Works ==
During his lifetime Cowell published two volumes of autobiography and anecdotes:

- -Thirty years passed among the players in England and America: interspersed with anecdotes and reminiscences of a variety of persons, directly or indirectly connected with the drama during the theatrical life of Joe Cowell, comedian: Part I: England. New York: Harper & brothers. 1844.
- -Thirty years passed among the players in England and America: interspersed with anecdotes and reminiscences of a variety of persons, directly or indirectly connected with the drama during the theatrical life of Joe Cowell, comedian: Part II: America.
