= That Mysterious Rag =

1911 song by Irving Berlin and Ted Snyder

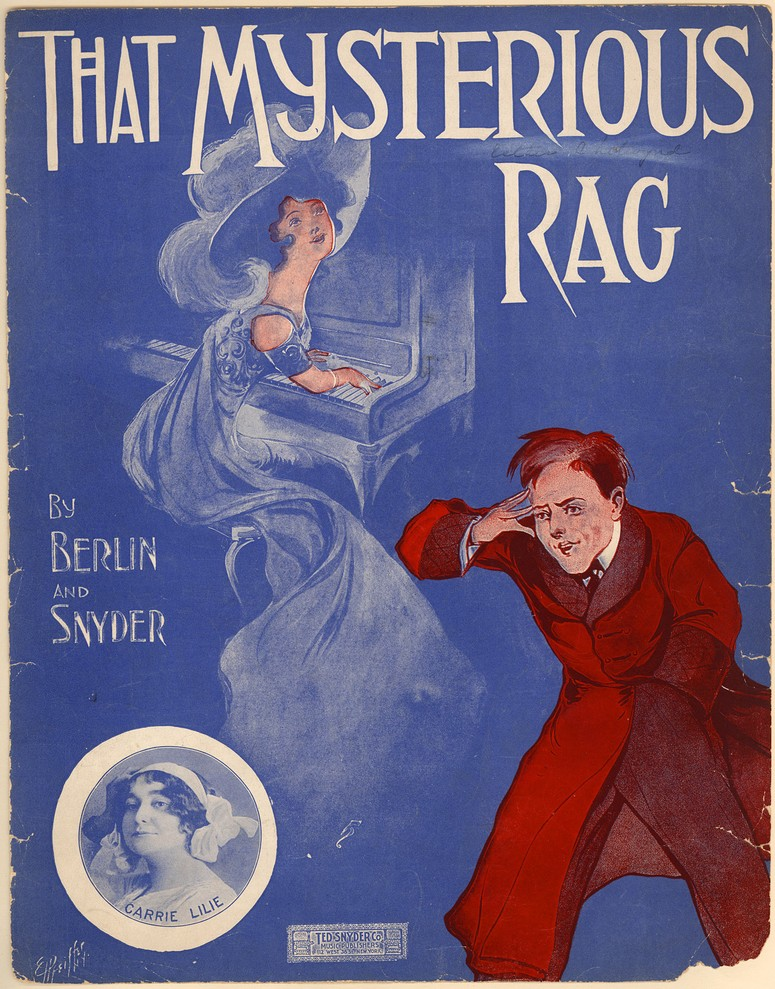
Cover page to the sheet music.

"That Mysterious Rag" (1911)
1911 recording by singer Billy Murray of "That Mysterious Rag."

"That Mysterious Rag" is a song by Irving Berlin and Ted Snyder written in 1911. It was one of the earliest Berlin songs to become a commercial success with recordings by Arthur Collins & Albert Campbell and by the American Quartet being very popular in 1912.

== Composition ==
According to Howard Pollack in a biography of George Gershwin, "That Mysterious Rag" was one of a trio of songs written by Berlin in 1911 that revolutionized American popular music, the others being "Alexander's Ragtime Band" and "Everybody's Doin' It". Until the publication of this song ragtime had been so distinctively an African-American musical genre that the occasional rag whose lyrics and cover art indicated some other ethnicity would focus instead on some other marginalized group (usually Jewish or Italian) and apply the dichotomy toward comic effect. With "That Mysterious Rag", notes Irving Berlin biographer Charles Hamm, ragtime music first sees cover art of a fashionably dressed white couple and lyrics that lack distinctive ethnic markers in dialect or syntax.

Did you hear it? Were you near it?
If you weren't then you've yet to fear it;
Once you've met it you'll regret it,
Just because you never will forget it.

The American Quartet recorded the piece in a generic accent. The musical structure also avoids characteristic ethnic overtones. As Hamm explains:

There is no trace of syncopation beyond a single 3+3+2 pattern in the chorus, no minor tonality, no reference to one ethnic group or another. The most arresting moment, the cross-relation at the beginning of the verse, has no specific ethnic (or any other) connotation.

"That Mysterious Rag" is the first instance of a change that Berlin employs consistently from 1912 onward: a generic style lacking in specific ethnic connotations whose audience is no longer solely the working class, but whose reach includes patrons of the legitimate theater. Berlin continued to use rag and ragtime in song titles during the period when the terms were nearly synonymous with popular music. Although Berlin's compositions differed significantly from classic piano rags by Scott Joplin and other African-American composers, Hamm contends that Berlin's work targeted a different audience and the commercial success of Berlin songs such as "That Mysterious Rag" neither helped nor hindered the sales of piano rags. Or as Richard Crawford explains, "That Mysterious Rag" recognizes the style's haunting, distracting traits and removes it from a racial setting. Crawford finds other faults with the lyrical structure: It would be hard to find another Berlin song with one-syllable words so awkwardly stretched or natural declamation so bent out of shape.

== Performance and reception ==
Berlin performed the piece during September 1911 wearing a coat and tails, receiving star billing at the Hammerstein Victoria Theatre owned by Willie Hammerstein at Times Square. Berlin refused calls for encores and received a favorable review from Variety. Erik Satie used "That Mysterious Rag" in 1917 for his ballet Parade. The song remained popular for more than a decade.
