= Fay Compton =

English actress (1894–1978)

Fay Compton CBE
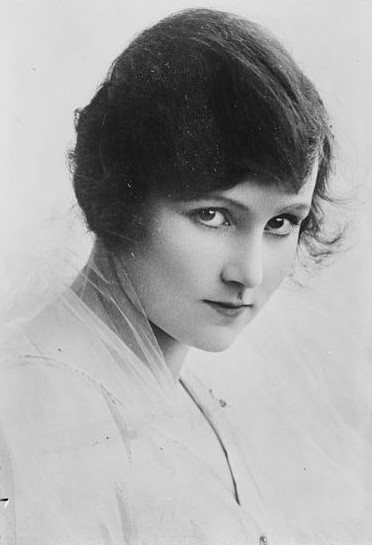
- Born: Virginia Lilian Emmeline Compton-Mackenzie; 18 September 1894; Fulham, London, England
- Died: 12 December 1978 (aged 84); Hove, Sussex, England
- Occupation: Actress
- Years active: 1911–1977
- Spouses: H. G. Pelissier (m. 1911; died 1913) Lauri de Frece (m. 1914; died 1921) Leon Quartermaine (m. 1922; div. 1942) Ralph Michael (m. 1942; div. 1946)
- Children: Anthony Pelissier
- Relatives: Compton Mackenzie (brother); Viola Compton (sister); Edward Compton (father); Henry Compton (grandfather)

Virginia Lilian Emmeline Compton-Mackenzie, CBE (/ˈkʌmptən/; 18 September 1894 – 12 December 1978), known professionally as Fay Compton, was an English actress. She appeared in several films, and made many broadcasts, but was best known for her stage performances. She was known for her versatility, and appeared in Shakespeare, drawing room comedy, pantomime, modern drama, and classics such as Ibsen and Chekhov. In addition to performing in Britain, Compton appeared several times in the US, and toured Australia and New Zealand in a variety of stage plays.

== Life and career ==
=== Early years ===
Compton was born in Fulham, London, the sixth and youngest child and fourth daughter of Edward Compton (1854–1918), actor and manager (whose real surname was Mackenzie), and his wife, the actress Virginia Frances Bateman (1853–1940) daughter of the actor Hezekiah Linthicum Bateman, of Baltimore, US. One of her brothers became well known as the author Compton Mackenzie.

Compton made her first professional appearance in 1911 with the concert party The Follies under the leadership of H. G. Pelissier, her first husband, whom she married while still in her teens. The marriage was short-lived: Pelissier died in September 1913 at the age of 39, leaving his young widow with an infant son, who would become the producer and director Anthony Pelissier. In 1914, at Maidenhead, as Fay C. Pellissier, she married secondly the young singer Lauri de Frece. In 1914, she made the first of many appearances on the American stage, at the Shubert Theatre, New York, in To-Night's the Night, subsequently touring in the same part. In London during the First World War she played a variety of roles, including the title role in Peter Pan in 1917.

=== 1920s and 30s ===
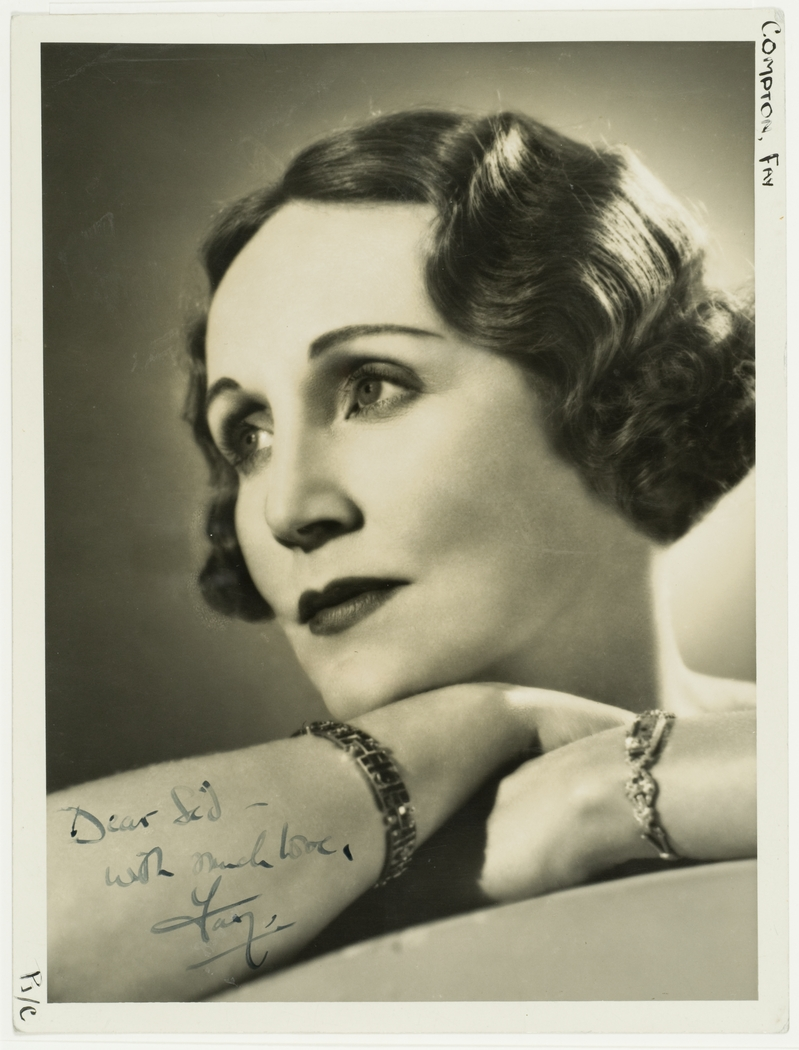
Fay Compton, actor, 1938

In 1921 she was the eponymous star of the play Mary Rose written especially for her by J. M. Barrie. This work was partly inspired by Compton's own tragic marriage to the West End satirist H. G. Pélissier and her subsequent youthful widowhood. In the 1920s her parts included the first of many Shakespeare roles, Ophelia, to the Hamlet of John Barrymore. The critic James Agate wrote of her performance, "She was fragrant, wistful, and had a child's importunacy unmatched in my time." Compton's second husband, the actor Lauri de Frece, died in 1921, aged 41, and in February 1922 she married Leon Quartermaine, with whom she had acted in a revival of Barrie's Quality Street.

Compton had a reputation for versatility, and in 1931 she appeared successively in the title role of the pantomime Dick Whittington and Ophelia to Henry Ainley's Hamlet. Throughout the 1930s Compton moved between West End plays, mostly ephemeral, pantomime and Shakespeare – Titania, Lady Rosaline, Calpurnia, and Paulina in The Winter's Tale, one of her favourite parts – and toured in Australia and New Zealand in Victoria Regina, Tonight at 8.30 and George and Margaret. In 1939 she played Ophelia to the Hamlet of John Gielgud, first at the Lyceum and then at Elsinore Castle.

In 1927 Compton opened an acting school in London, the Fay Compton Studio of Dramatic Art, which continued in business up to the start of World War II. Notable alumni included Alec Guinness and John Le Mesurier.

=== 1940s to 1960s ===
During the 1940s Compton appeared at the Old Vic as Regan in King Lear, played Ruth in Noël Coward's Blithe Spirit for 15 months, Regina in The Little Foxes, toured for the British Council, in Belgium, the Netherlands, France and Switzerland, in Othello, Candida and Hamlet, and made her first appearance in an Ibsen play as Gina Ekdal in The Wild Duck. Her third marriage was dissolved in 1942, and in that year she married the actor Ralph Michael; this marriage was dissolved in 1946. There were no children of Compton's last three marriages.

In the 1950s Compton rejoined the Old Vic company, appearing at the 1953 Edinburgh Festival, as Gertrude in Hamlet, and in London in the 1953–1954 season, as Gertrude; the Countess of Rossillion in All's Well That Ends Well; Constance of Bretagne in King John; Volumnia in Coriolanus; and Juno in The Tempest. With the same company she played Queen Margaret in Richard III in 1957, to the Richard of Robert Helpmann, and Lady Bracknell in The Importance of Being Earnest in 1959.

At the first Chichester Festival, from July to September 1962, Compton played Grausis in The Broken Heart, and Marya in Uncle Vanya. Her other stage roles of the 1960s included Mrs Malaprop in The Rivals, and her last Barrie role, the Comtesse in What Every Woman Knows.

Compton was awarded the CBE in 1975. She died on 12 December 1978 in Hove at the age of 84.

== Film and television ==
Compton's film work is not as well known as her stage appearances. She appeared in more than 40 films between 1914 and 1970. Her most popular performances in films are Odd Man Out (1947), Laughter in Paradise (1951), Orson Welles' Othello (1952), The Haunting (1963) and I Start Counting (1969).

Among her television performances, she appeared in 1965 with Michael Hordern in the television play Land of My Dreams by Clive Exton. Among her last major roles were Aunt Ann in the BBC's 1967 television adaptation of The Forsyte Saga, and Mrs Brown the old rag dealer in a BBC adaptation of Dickens' Dombey and Son in 1969.

== Filmography ==
=== Film ===
- She Stoops to Conquer (1914, Short) - Barmaid
- The Labour Leader (1917) - Diana Hazlitt
- One Summer's Day (1917) - Maisie
- Judge Not (1920) - Nelly
- A Woman of No Importance (1921) - Rachel Arbuthnot
- The Old Wives' Tale (1921) - Sophie Barnes
- The House of Peril (1922) - Sylvia Bailey
- Diana of the Crossways (1922) - Diana
- A Bill of Divorcement (1922) - Margaret Fairfield
- This Freedom (1923) - Rosalie Aubyn
- The Loves of Mary, Queen of Scots (1923) - Mary Stuart
- Claude Duval (1924) - Duchess Frances
- The Eleventh Commandment (1924) - Ruth Barchester
- The Happy Ending (1925) - Mildred Craddock
- Settled Out of Court (1925) - The Woman
- London Love (1926) - Sally Hope
- Robinson Crusoe (1927) - Sophie
- Somehow Good (1927) - Rosalind Nightingale
- Zero (1928) - Mrs. Garth
- Fashions in Love (1929) - Marie De Remy
- Cape Forlorn (1931) - Eileen Kell
- Uneasy Virtue (1931) - Dorothy Rendell
- Tell England (1931) - Mrs. Doe
- Autumn Crocus (1934) - Jenny Gray
- Waltzes from Vienna (1934) - Countess Helga von Stahl
- Song at Eventide (1934) - Helen d'Alaste
- Wedding Group (1936) - Florence Nightingale
- The Mill on the Floss (1936) - Mrs. Tulliver
- So This Is London (1939) - Lady Worthing
- The Prime Minister (1941) - Queen Victoria
- Odd Man Out (1947) - Rosie
- Nicholas Nickleby (1947) - Madame Mantalini/Mme Mantalini
- London Belongs to Me (1948) - Mrs. Josser
- Esther Waters (1948) - Mrs. Barfield
- Britannia Mews (1949) - Mrs. Culver
- Blackmailed (1951) - Mrs. Christopher
- Laughter in Paradise (1951) - Agnes Russell
- Othello (1951) - Emilia
- Lady Possessed (1952) - Mme. Brune
- I Vinti (The Vanquished) (1953) - Mrs. Pinkerton
- Aunt Clara (1954) - Gladys Smith
- Doublecross (1956) - Alice Pascoe
- Town on Trial (1957) - Mrs. Crowley
- The Story of Esther Costello (1957) - Mother Superior
- Il fiore e la violenza (1962) - Mrs. Pinkerton (segment "Il delitto")
- The Haunting (1963) - Mrs. Sanderson
- Uncle Vanya (1963) - Marya, the mother
- Journey to Midnight (1968) - Queen Victoria (episode 'Poor Butterfly')
- I Start Counting (1969) - Mrs. Bennett
- The Virgin and the Gypsy (1970) - Grandma

=== Television ===
- Douglas Fairbanks Presents (1955, 1 episode) - Mrs. Saunders
- London Playhouse (1955, 1 episode) - Adeline Girard
- Nicholas Nickleby (1956, 2 episodes) - Mrs. Squeers
- BBC Sunday-Night Theatre (1955-1959, 4 episodes) - Kate / Fanny Cavendish / Emmie Rockley / Mary
- ITV Television Playhouse (1956-1961, 3 episodes) - Great Aunt Julia / Nannie / Mrs. Gillis
- Armchair Theatre (1957-1964, 3 episodes) - Victoria / Angelica
- Our Mutual Friend (1958, 3 episodes) - Mrs. Betty Higden
- The Widow of Bath (1959, 5 episodes) - Mrs. Leonard
- BBC Sunday-Night Play (1960-1962, 2 episodes) - Mrs. Umney / Mrs. Flint / Mrs. Sarah Victoria Marryot
- ITV Play of the Week (1961, 2 episodes) - Victoria Verity
- No Hiding Place (1961-1962, 3 episodes) - Mrs. Halfpenny / Mrs. Haven / Mrs. Palmer
- Dixon of Dock Green (1962-1965, 3 episodes) - Nelly Cook / Sarah Conroy / Mrs. Binney
- Maigret (1962, 1 episode) - Jaquette
- Call Oxbridge 2000 (1962, 1 episode) - Miss Effie Tavener
- First Night (1964, 1 episode) - Alice Walmer
- Dr. Finlay's Casebook (1964, 1 episode) - Mrs. Tennant
- Story Parade (1965, 1 episode) - Miss Babbage
- Our Man at St. Mark's (1965, 1 episode) - Edie Russell
- Knock on Any Door (1965, 1 episode) - Hester Warren
- The Forsyte Saga (1967, 6 episodes) - 'Aunt Ann' Forsyte
- Sanctuary (1967-1968, 4 episodes) - Sister Juliana
- Cold Comfort Farm (1968, 3 episodes) - Aunt Ada Doom (Starkadder)
- Journey to the Unknown (1969, 1 episode) - Queen Victoria
- Dombey and Son (1969, 7 episodes) - Mrs. Brown
- Fraud Squad (1970, 1 episode) - Lady Flanders (final appearance)

== Publications ==
- Rosemary: some remembrances (1926), introduction by Compton Mackenzie

== Sources ==
- Parker, John; et al., eds. (1978). Who Was Who in the Theatre. Detroit: Gale. OCLC 310466453.
