= H. L. Bateman =

American actor (1812–1875)

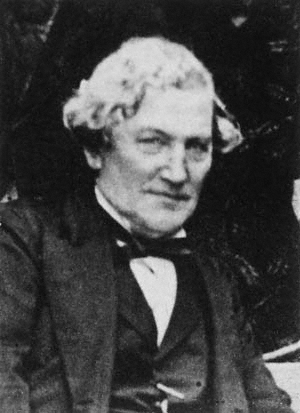
Hezekiah Linthicum Bateman in about 1870

Hezekiah Linthicum Bateman (December 6, 1812 – March 22, 1875), was an American actor and manager.

== Life ==
Born in Baltimore, Maryland in 1812, the fourth child and second son of Amzi Bateman (c. 1777–1816), a fisherman, and his wife, Catherine Bateman (née Schaeffer) (c. 1784–1870). Amzi Bateman had served with the 6th Regiment of the Maryland Militia and took part in the defence of Baltimore against the invasion by the British troops during the Anglo-American War of 1812. After his death in 1816 his widow tutored students to support herself and her children.

Hezekiah Bateman was reluctantly apprenticed to an engineer but in 1832 left that position to become an actor, playing with Ellen Tree (afterwards Mrs Charles Kean) in juvenile leads. In 1855 he was manager of the St Louis theatre for a few years and in 1859 moved to New York. In 1866 he was manager for his daughter Kate, and in 1871 returned to London, where he managed the Lyceum Theatre. Here he engaged Henry Irving, presenting him in The Bells, with great success.

His wife Sidney Frances Cowell was an actress. His daughter the actress Virginia Frances Bateman (1853–1940) married the British actor-manager Edward Compton. Another daughter was the actress Kate Josephine Bateman. His grandchildren included the British novelist Sir Edward Montague Compton Mackenzie (1883–1972) and the actress Fay Compton (1894–1978).
