= Compton (surname) =

Compton is an English surname. Notable people with the surname include:

- Allen T. Compton (1938–2008), justice of the Alaska Supreme Court
- Ann Compton (born 1947), American journalist
- Arthur Compton (1892–1962), American physicist and Nobel Prize winner, of the Compton effect
- Barnes Compton (1830–1898), Maryland congressman and state officeholder
- Billy Compton (1896–1976), English footballer
- Carla Compton, Canadian politician
- Catherine Compton (1731–1784), English noblewoman
- Charles Compton (1698–1755), English politician and diplomat
- Charles H. Compton (1880–1966), American librarian and educator
- Christian Compton (1929–2006), justice of the supreme court of Virginia
- Cliff Compton (born 1979), American professional wrestler, better known by his ring name, Domino
- Dale L. Compton (born 1935), American aerospace engineer and director of NASA Ames Research Center
- David G. Compton (1930–2023), British science fiction author
- Denis Compton (1918–1997), England cricketer and footballer
- Edward Compton (actor) (1854–1918), English actor-manager
- Edward Theodore Compton (1849–1921), English-born, German artist, illustrator, and mountain climber
- Lady Emily Compton (born 1980), English fashion model, editor, and stylist
- Erik Compton (born 1979), Norwegian-American professional golfer
- F. E. Compton, publisher
- Fay Compton (1894–1974), English actress
- Francis Compton (Conservative politician) (1824–1915), English lawyer and Conservative MP
- Sir Francis Compton (c. 1629–1716), English soldier and MP for Warwick
- Frances Snow Compton, a pseudonym used by Henry Adams
- Freeman W. Compton (1824–1893), justice of the Arkansas Supreme Court
- Harry Compton (1899–1951), Canadian soldier
- Henry Compton, Bishop of London
- Henry Compton (actor), English actor
- Herbert Eastwick Compton (1856–1906), English writer
- Ivy Compton-Burnett, English novelist
- John Compton, leader of Saint Lucia United Workers Party
- John Compton, London pipe & electronic organ maker
- Karl Taylor Compton (1887–1954), physicist, president of MIT
- Katie Compton, American bicycle racer
- Leslie Compton, English footballer and cricketer
- Lynn Compton, lead prosecutor in the Sirhan Sirhan trial
- Nick Compton (born 1983), English cricketer
- O'Neal Compton (1951–2019), American film and television actor
- Patrick Compton (born 1952), South African cricketer
- Paul Compton (born 1961), English footballer and football manager
- Paul Justin Compton (born 1944), Australian computer scientist
- Richard Compton (1938–2007), American actor
- Richard G. Compton (born 1955), chemist
- Richard Compton (cricketer) (born 1956), South African cricketer
- Robert Harold Compton (1886–1979), South African botanist
- Sean Compton, American Broadcast executive
- Spencer Compton, 1st Earl of Wilmington (c. 1674–1743), British statesman and prime minister
- Virginia Frances Bateman or Bateman Compton (1853–1940), American-born British actor-manager
- Walter Ames Compton (1911–1990), American Doctor and Japanese sword collector.
- Wayde Compton (born 1972), Canadian writer
- William Compton (courtier) (c. 1482–1528), lover of Henry VIII's mistress, Anne Stafford
- Wilson Martindale Compton (1890–1967), fifth president of Washington State University

== See also ==
- Compton Mackenzie (1883–1972), Scottish novelist, brother of Fay Compton
