= Edward Compton =

Edward Compton may refer to:

- Edward Compton (actor) (1854–1918), English actor and theatre manager
- Edward Theodore Compton (1849–1921), English-born German artist
- Edward Harrison Compton (1881–1960), German painter
- Edward Compton (cricketer) (1872–1940), English cricketer

== See also ==
- Edward Crompton, baseball player
- Compton (surname)
