= 2013 English cricket season =

County Championship
- Champions: Durham
- Runners-up: Yorkshire
- Most runs: Gary Ballance (1251)
- Most wickets: Graham Onions (70)

Yorkshire Bank 40
- Champions: Nottinghamshire
- Runners-up: Glamorgan
- Most runs: Peter Trego (745)
- Most wickets: Michael Hogan (28)

Friends Life t20
- Champions: Northamptonshire
- Runners-up: Surrey
- Most runs: Craig Kieswetter (517)
- Most wickets: Azharullah (27)

PCA Player of the Year
- Moeen Ali

Wisden Cricketers of the Year
- Nick Compton; Hashim Amla; Jacques Kallis; Dale Steyn; Marlon Samuels

The 2013 English cricket season was the 114th in which the County Championship had been an official competition. It began on 5 April with a round of university matches, and continued until the conclusion of a round of County Championship matches on 27 September. Three major domestic competitions were contested: the 2013 County Championship, the 2013 Clydesdale Bank 40 and the 2013 Friends Life t20.

Australia toured England to compete for the Ashes. It was the 76th test series between the two sides with England winning 3-0. The New Zealand cricket team toured earlier in the summer.

== Roll of honour ==
Test series

- England v New Zealand: 2 Tests - England won 2–0.
- England v Australia: 5 Tests - England won 3–0.

ODI series

- England v New Zealand: 3 ODIs - New Zealand won 2–1.
- England v Australia: 5 ODIs - Australia won 2–1.

Twenty20 International series

- England v New Zealand: 2 T20Is - New Zealand won 1–0.
- England v Australia: 2 T20Is - Series drawn 1-1.

ICC Champions Trophy

- Champions Trophy: Winners - India

County Championship

- Division One winners: Durham
- Division One runners-up: Yorkshire
- Division Two winners: Lancashire

Yorkshire Bank 40

- Winners: Nottinghamshire Outlaws
- Runners-up: Glamorgan Dragons

Friends Life t20

- Winners: Northamptonshire Steelbacks
- Runners-up: Surrey

Minor Counties Championship

- Winners: Cheshire
- Runners-up: Cambridgeshire

MCCA Knockout Trophy

- Winners: Berkshire
- Runners-up: Shropshire

Second XI Championship

- Winners: Lancashire II and Middlesex II (shared title)

Second XI Trophy

- Winners: Lancashire II

Second XI Twenty20

- Winners: Surrey II

Wisden Cricketers of the Year

- Nick Compton, Hashim Amla, Jacques Kallis, Dale Steyn, Marlon Samuels

PCA Player of the Year

- Moeen Ali

== County Championship ==
=== Divisions ===
Division One	Division Two
Derbyshire	Essex
Durham	Glamorgan
Middlesex	Gloucestershire
Nottinghamshire	Hampshire
Somerset	Kent
Surrey	Lancashire
Sussex	Leicestershire
Warwickshire	Northamptonshire
Yorkshire	Worcestershire

Icon
Team promoted from Division Two
Team relegated from Division One

=== Division One Standings ===
- Pld = Played, W = Wins, L = Losses, D = Draws, T = Ties, A = Abandonments, Bat = Batting points, Bowl = Bowling points, Ded = Deducted points, Pts = Points.

Team	Pld	W	L	T	D	A	Bat	Bowl	Ded	Pts
Durham (C)	16	10	4	0	2	0	36	46	2.5	245.5
Yorkshire	16	7	2	0	7	0	49	39	0.0	221
Sussex	16	5	3	0	8	0	45	39	0.0	188
Warwickshire	16	5	2	0	9	0	37	42	0.0	186
Middlesex	16	6	5	0	5	0	32	39	0.0	182
Somerset	16	3	5	0	8	0	33	41	0.0	146
Nottinghamshire	16	2	5	0	9	0	47	40	0.0	146
Derbyshire (R)	16	3	10	0	3	0	31	34	0.0	122
Surrey (R)	16	1	6	0	9	0	36	37	0.0	116

=== Division Two Standings ===
- Pld = Played, W = Wins, L = Losses, D = Draws, T = Ties, A = Abandonments, Bat = Batting points, Bowl = Bowling points, Ded = Deducted points, Pts = Points.

Team	Pld	W	L	T	D	A	Bat	Bowl	Ded	Pts
Lancashire (C)	16	8	1	0	7	0	45	45	1.0	238
Northamptonshire (P)	16	5	3	0	8	0	55	43	0.0	202
Essex	16	5	4	0	7	0	43	41	3.0	182
Hampshire	16	4	3	0	9	0	45	35	0.0	171
Worcestershire	16	5	6	0	5	0	29	43	0.0	167
Gloucestershire	16	4	4	0	8	0	43	36	0.0	167
Kent	16	3	2	0	11	0	39	31	0.0	151
Glamorgan	16	3	6	0	7	0	41	39	0.0	149
Leicestershire	16	0	8	0	8	0	23	32	0.0	79

== Yorkshire Bank 40 ==
=== Group stage ===
Group A

Team	Pld	W	L	T	NR	Pts	NRR
Nottinghamshire Outlaws	12	9	3	0	0	18	+0.457
Northamptonshire Steelbacks	12	8	3	0	1	17	+0.393
Sussex Sharks	12	6	4	0	2	14	+0.464
Kent Spitfires	12	6	6	0	0	12	+0.229
Worcestershire Royals	12	5	7	0	0	10	+0.249
Netherlands	12	2	7	0	3	7	–1.157
Warwickshire Bears	12	2	8	0	2	6	–0.929

Group B

Team	Pld	W	L	T	NR	Pts	NRR
Hampshire Royals	12	9	3	0	0	18	+0.734
Essex Eagles	12	8	4	0	0	16	+0.972
Lancashire Lightning	12	7	4	0	1	15	–0.023
Durham Dynamos	12	7	4	0	1	14.75	+0.657
Surrey	12	4	6	0	2	10	–0.524
Derbyshire Falcons	12	3	6	0	3	9	–0.250
Scottish Saltires	12	0	11	0	1	1	–1.940

Group C

Team	Pld	W	L	T	NR	Pts	NRR
Somerset	12	8	3	0	1	17	+1.006
Glamorgan	12	8	3	0	1	17	+0.576
Middlesex Panthers	12	7	4	0	1	15	+0.315
Gloucestershire Gladiators	12	7	4	0	1	15	+0.163
Leicestershire Foxes	12	5	7	0	0	10	–0.353
Yorkshire Vikings	12	3	9	0	0	6	–0.468
Unicorns	12	1	9	0	2	4	–1.196

=== Knockout stage ===
Semi-finals
1	Hampshire Royals	203/8
4	Glamorgan	234/4
3	Nottinghamshire Outlaws	122/2
2	Somerset	119

Final
Glamorgan	157
Nottinghamshire Outlaws	244/8

== Friends Life t20 ==
=== Group stage ===
Midlands/Wales/West Division

Pos	Team	Pld	W	L	T	NR	Pts	NRR
1	Northamptonshire Steelbacks	10	7	3	0	0	14	0.329
2	Somerset	10	6	4	0	0	12	0.841
3	Glamorgan	10	5	5	0	0	10	−0.168
4	Warwickshire Bears	10	5	5	0	0	10	−0.410
5	Worcestershire Royals	10	4	6	0	0	8	−0.327
6	Gloucestershire Gladiators	10	3	7	0	0	6	−0.245

North Group

Pos	Team	Pld	W	L	T	NR	Pts	NRR
1	Nottinghamshire Outlaws	10	7	3	0	0	14	1.009
2	Lancashire Lightning	10	5	3	2	0	12	0.177
3	Durham Dynamos^{†}	10	6	4	0	0	11.75	0.317
4	Leicestershire Foxes	10	4	5	1	0	9	0.417
5	Derbyshire Falcons	10	4	6	0	0	8	−0.604
6	Yorkshire Vikings	10	2	7	1	0	5	−1.223

^{†}Durham were deducted 0.25 points for a breach of team salary payments in 2012.

South Group

Pos	Team	Pld	W	L	T	NR	Pts	NRR
1	Hampshire Royals	10	8	1	0	1	17	0.810
2	Surrey	10	7	3	0	0	14	0.915
3	Essex Eagles	10	5	4	0	1	11	−0.040
4	Middlesex Panthers	10	5	5	0	0	10	−0.194
5	Kent Spitfires	10	3	7	0	0	6	−0.941
6	Sussex Sharks	10	1	9	0	0	2	−0.520

=== Knockout stage ===
Quarter-finals
M2	Somerset	148/6
S2	Surrey (H)	151/7
S1	Hampshire Royals (H)	202/3
N2	Lancashire Lightning	201/4
M1	Northamptonshire Steelbacks (H)	183/4
N3	Durham Dynamos	147/6
S3	Essex Eagles	187/6
N1	Nottinghamshire Outlaws (H)	140

Semi-finals
S2	Surrey	145/6
S1	Hampshire Royals	142/9
M1	Northamptonshire Steelbacks	171/3
S3	Essex Eagles	168/5

Final
S2	Surrey	92
M1	Northamptonshire Steelbacks	194/2

== Test Series ==
=== Ashes tour ===
Cumulative record - Test wins	1876-2013
England	105
Australia	133
Drawn	93
