= Ben Compton (cricketer) =

English cricketer (born 1994)

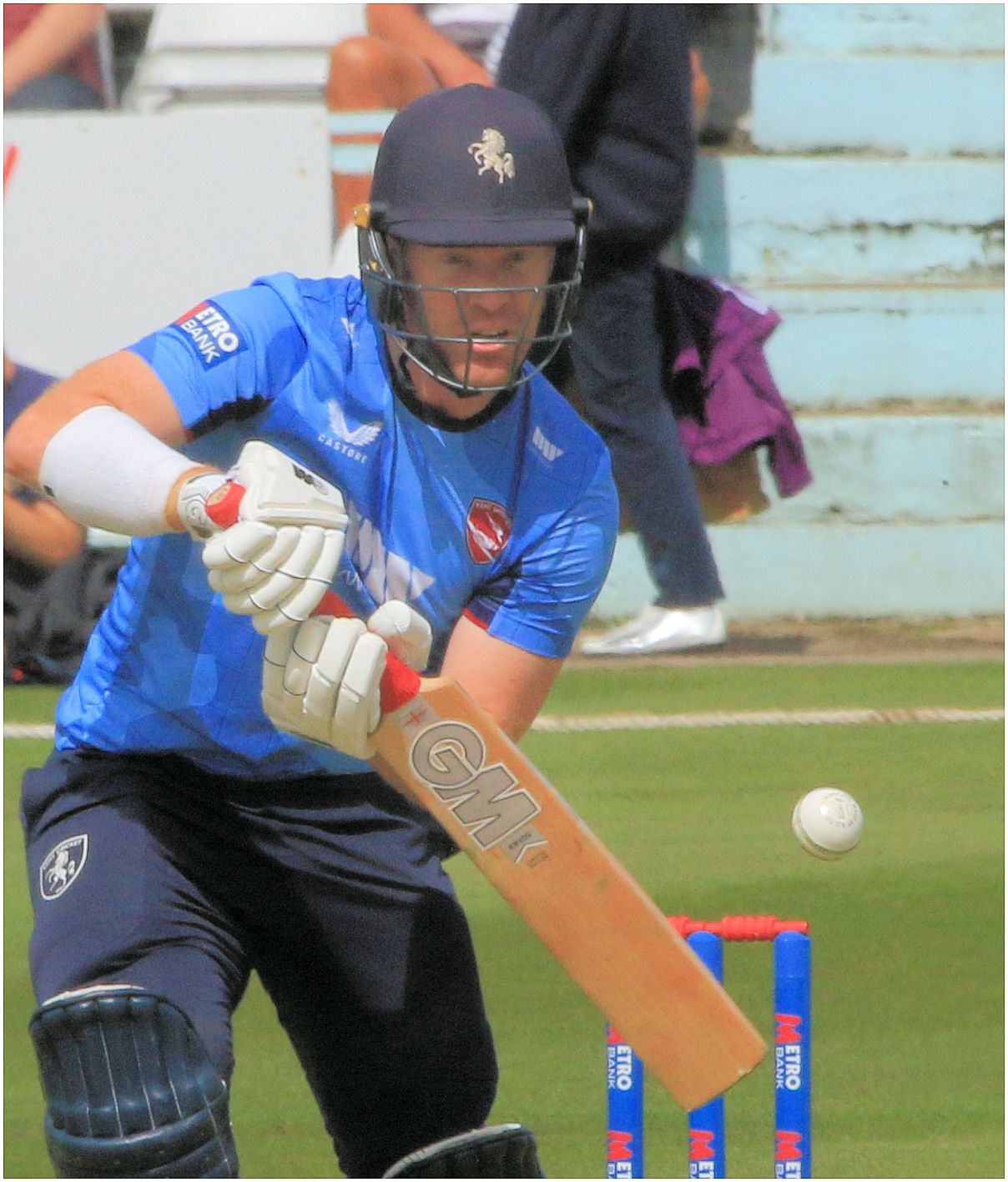
- Compton in 2023

Personal information
- Full name: Benjamin Garnet Compton
- Born: 29 March 1994 (age 32); Durban, Natal Province, South Africa
- Batting: Left-handed
- Bowling: Right-arm off break
- Role: Batsman
- Relatives: Patrick Compton (father); Denis Compton (grandfather); Leslie Compton (great uncle); Richard Compton (uncle); Nick Compton (cousin)

Domestic team information
- Years: Team
- 2019–2021: Nottinghamshire (squad no. 7)
- 2021: Norfolk
- 2021/22—2022/23: Mountaineers
- 2022–: Kent
- 2023/24–2024/25: KwaZulu-Natal Inland
- FC debut: 16 September 2019 Notts v Warwickshire
- LA debut: 10 August 2021 Notts v Northants

Career statistics
Competition	First-class	List A
Matches	91	29
Runs scored	6,835	1,243
Batting average	44.09	44.39
100s/50s	20/30	3/11
Top score	221	110
Catches/stumpings	56/–	9/–
- Source: Cricinfo, 27 September 2026

Benjamin Garnet Compton (born 29 March 1994) is an English cricketer. He is the only son of the cricketer Patrick Compton and a grandson of the cricketer-footballer Denis Compton. He made his first-class debut on 16 September 2019, for Nottinghamshire in the 2019 County Championship. He made his List A debut on 10 August 2021, for Nottinghamshire in the 2021 Royal London One-Day Cup.

Compton was released by Nottinghamshire at the end of the 2021 season. In the off-season he joined Kent on a two-year contract. During the 2021/22 English off-season he played for Mountaineers in Zimbabwean cricket. On 17 November 2021, in the 2021–22 Pro50 Championship match against the Rhinos, Compton scored his first century in List A cricket with 102 runs. In February 2022, in the 2021–22 Logan Cup, Compton also scored his maiden century in first-class cricket. Compton finished as the leading run-scorer in the 2021–22 Pro50 Championship, with 361 runs in eight matches, and was named the Batter of the Tournament.

Compton made his Kent debut in the first match of the 2022 season, where he scored a century, the third of his first-class career. A week later, in Kent's second match of the season, Compton scored his second and third centuries for the team, carrying his bat in the first innings and being the last batter dismissed in the second. He continued to score heavily and came close to achieving 1,000 first-class runs before the end of May, something only achieved nine times previously, the last in 1998. He had made 878 first-class runs in the County Championship in April and May before scoring 158 runs (in two innings combined) in the last match before the end of May, a red-ball two-innings match for a "First Class Counties XI" against the touring New Zealanders in a match that was not given first-class status as the teams used more than eleven players at different stages. He reached the 1,000 run milestone in June, having scored four centuries and five half-centuries during the season to that point.

At the end of the season, Compton was voted Kent's Men's Player of the Year. During the 2022—23 English winter, he returned to Zimbabwe, playing again for Mountaineers. He passed his previous highest first-class score of 140 in a match against Eagles in December, making 154 runs, before scoring his maiden double-century later in the month. His score of 217 came against Southern Rocks in an opening partnership of 228 runs with Joylord Gumbie. He signed a new Kent contract later the same month, keeping at the club until the end of 2024. In Kent's opening match of the 2023 season, Compton scored another century, matching his performance in scoring a century in the opening match of the previous season with an unbeaten 114 runs.

Compton signed a new one-year contract with Kent in October 2024 and a further three-year deal with the club in June 2025.

He scored a first-class career-best of 221 for Kent against Leicestershire at the St Lawrence Ground on 1 August 2025.
