= Francis Compton =

Francis Compton may refer to:

- Francis Compton (Conservative politician) (1824–1915), English lawyer and Conservative MP
- Sir Francis Compton (c. 1629–1716), English soldier and MP for Warwick
- Francis Compton (actor) (1885–1964), English actor

== See also ==
- Compton (surname)
