= 1,000 first-class runs before the end of May =

Cricket achievement

A batsman has scored 1,000 first-class runs before the end of May in an English cricket season on only eight occasions. In five of these occasions, the batsman reached 1,000 runs with innings played in April and May, but three scored 1,000 runs in the month of May alone. These were: W.G. Grace in 1895, Wally Hammond in 1927, and most recently Charlie Hallows in 1928.

Donald Bradman is the only person to have scored 1,000 runs before the end of May twice, in 1930 and 1938. Uniquely, a second batsman also reached 1,000 runs before the end of May in 1938, Bill Edrich, mainly thanks to a sporting declaration by Australia at 5.09pm on the third and final day of the match against Middlesex at Lord's on 28–30 May, when Edrich needed another 10 runs.

The rarely-achieved feat has become even more scarce since the Second World War, with only Glenn Turner and Graeme Hick reaching 1,000 runs before the end of May since 1938. In part, this is due to the reduced schedule of first-class cricket since the introduction of domestic one-day cricket competitions in the 1970s, and a corresponding reduction in the number of first-class matches played by English county teams and touring international teams. Hick, the last player to complete 1,000 first-class runs before the end of May, completed the bulk of the runs in three innings: 212 against Lancashire, 405 not out against Somerset, and 172 against the touring West Indies. He started this last innings, his last of the month, needing 153 to reach the target.

The start of the English cricket season has crept earlier in April in recent years, and Nick Compton came close to achieving 1,000 runs before the end of May 2012, needing 59 runs on 31 May against Worcestershire. Rain intervened with Compton having only scored nine, but he scored a century after resuming his innings the following day to pass 1,000 runs on 1 June. Other near misses include John Langridge who reached 1,000 runs on 2 June 1949, and Brian Lara, who reached 1,000 runs on 2 June 1994 from just seven innings.

Coincidentally, exactly ten years later, Ben Compton, the cousin of Nick, also narrowly missed out on the milestone formerly achieved by their grandfather Denis' long-time England and Middlesex team-mate Bill Edrich. In 2022 Ben Compton made 878 first-class runs in the County Championship for Kent in April and May before scoring 158 runs (in two innings combined) in the last match before the end of May, a red-ball two-innings match for a "First Class Counties XI" (or "County Select XI") against the touring New Zealand cricket team. However, unlike in Hick's case in 1988, the tour match was not given first-class status as the sides used more that eleven players at different stages, so this is not recognised as 1,000 first-class runs before the end of May.

== 1,000 runs before the end of May ==
Name	Teams	Started	Ended	Days	Innings	April/May	Notes
W. G. Grace	MCC and Gloucestershire and England	9 May	30 May 1895	22	10	May	aged 46
Tom Hayward	Surrey	16 April	31 May 1900	46	13	April+May	
Wally Hammond	Gloucestershire	7 May	28 May 1927	22	13	May	
Charlie Hallows	Lancashire	5 May	31 May 1928	27	11	May	1,000 runs in the Championship in May
Donald Bradman	Australia	28 April	31 May 1930	34	11	April+May	926 runs in May
Donald Bradman	Australia	28 April	27 May 1938	30	7	April+May	798 runs in May
Bill Edrich	Middlesex	30 April	31 May 1938	32	15	April+May	all at Lord's
Glenn Turner	New Zealand	24 April	31 May 1973	38	18	April+May	
Graeme Hick	Worcestershire	18 April	28 May 1988	41	11	April+May	including 405 not out against Somerset
