= Patrick Compton =

South African cricketer (born 1952)

Personal information
- Full name: Patrick Mark Denis Compton
- Born: 28 November 1952 (age 73); London, England
- Batting: Right-handed
- Relatives: Denis Compton (father); Leslie Compton (uncle); Richard Compton (brother); Ben Compton (son); Nick Compton (nephew)

Domestic team information
- Years: Team
- 1979/80: Natal
- FC debut: 17 November 1979 Natal v Transvaal
- Last FC: 31 December 1979 Natal v Eastern Province

Career statistics
Competition	First-class
Matches	3
Runs scored	97
Batting average	19.40
100s/50s	0/1
Top score	52
Catches/stumpings	1/–
- Source: CricketArchive, 25 January 2022

Patrick Mark Denis Compton (born 28 November 1952) is a South African journalist and retired cricketer.

== Background ==
He played for Middlesex 2nd XI against Sussex 2nd XI as a batsman in 1968. He later played for Natal in three first-class matches in the Howa Bowl in 1979/1980. He scored 97 runs (average 19.40) with a personal best of 52.

Compton is the second son of the cricketer and footballer Denis Compton (through his second marriage). He was raised by his father until 1971, when he joined his mother and brother Richard in South Africa.

His son, Ben, is a Kent cricketer who formerly represented Nottinghamshire.

Patrick Compton is also one of the leading cricket writers in South Africa, having worked for the Independent group in Durban for many years.
