= Denis Compton Oval =

Cricket ground in England

Coordinates: 51°41′24″N 0°17′51″W

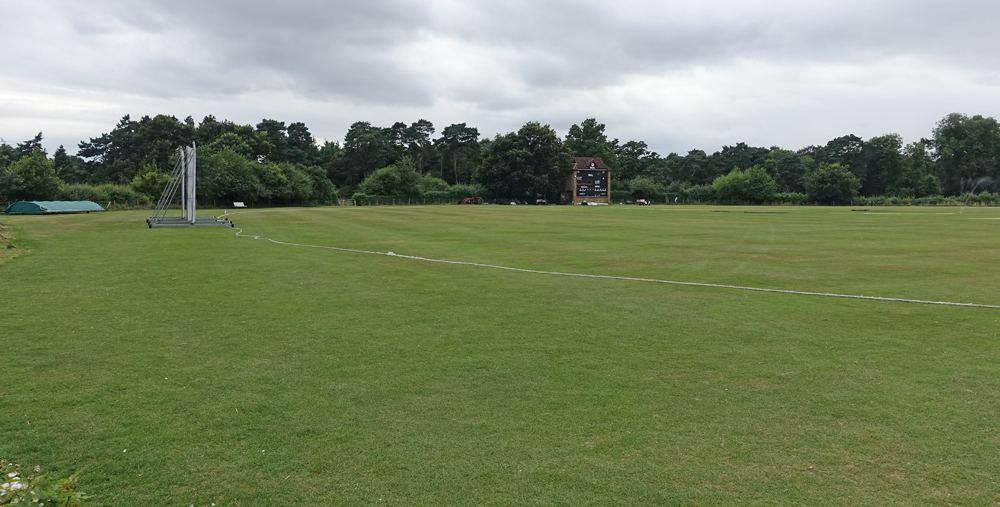
- Interactive map of Denis Compton Oval

Ground information
- Location: Shenley, Hertfordshire
- Country: England
- Establishment: 1993; 33 years ago

International information
- First women's Test: 15–19 July 1999: England v India
- Last women's Test: 7–12 August 2003: England v South Africa
- First women's ODI: 20 July 1993: Ireland v New Zealand
- Last women's ODI: 14 August 2008: England v South Africa

Team information
Middlesex	(2002–2004)
Hertfordshire	(1999–2000)
Marylebone Cricket Club	(1996–1999)
Shenley Village Cricket Club	(2010)
- As of 5 September 2020; Source: Ground profile

The Denis Compton Oval is a cricket ground located at the Shenley Cricket Centre in Shenley, Hertfordshire, England. The ground was opened by Denis Compton and the main ground was named in his honour. At the heart of the centre is the 19th-century pavilion, originally designed by the legendary cricketer W. G. Grace.

== Domestic cricket ==
The first recorded match on the ground was in 1993, when Hertfordshire played the Marylebone Cricket Club (MCC). Their first Minor Counties Championship match played on the ground was between Hertfordshire and Staffordshire. From 1995 to 2000, the ground played host to five Minor Counties Championship matches and eight MCCA Knockout Trophy matches.

The ground has played host to a number of first-class matches. The first first-class match played on the ground was in 1996 and was contested between the MCC and South Africa A. The MCC used the ground for two further first-class matches in 1997 and 1999. Middlesex also used the ground for three first-class matches from 2002 to 2004, all against touring international teams.

The ground has also played host to List-A matches. The MCC used the ground for a single List-A match against the touring Pakistanis in 1996, while Middlesex CCC have used the ground for three List-A matches, the last of which came when the county played the touring West Indians.

In local domestic cricket, the ground is home to Shenley Village Cricket Club, who play in the Championship of the Hertfordshire Premier Cricket League.

== Women's international cricket ==
Women's Test cricket matches have also been held on the ground. The first Women's Test match played at the Oval was between England women and India women. From 1999 to 2003, the ground played host to four Women's Test matches, the last of which was between England women and South Africa women. In addition to hosting Women's Test matches, the ground has hosted five Women's One Day International cricket matches. The first Women's ODI held on the ground was between Ireland women and New Zealand women during the 1993 Women's Cricket World Cup.
