= Richard Compton (cricketer) =

South African cricketer (born 1956)

Personal information
- Full name: Richard Cecil Denis Compton
- Born: 29 March 1956 (age 70); London, England
- Batting: Right-handed
- Bowling: Right-arm fast-medium
- Relatives: Denis Compton (father); Patrick Compton (brother); Nick Compton (son); Leslie Compton (uncle); Ben Compton (nephew)

Domestic team information
- Years: Team
- 1978/79–1980/81: Natal
- FC debut: 18 November 1978 Natal v Transvaal
- Last FC: 30 December 1980 Natal v Eastern Province

Career statistics
| Competition | First-class |
|---|---|
| Matches | 7 |
| Runs scored | 99 |
| Batting average | 9.00 |
| 100s/50s | 0/0 |
| Top score | 34 |
| Balls bowled | 976 |
| Wickets | 18 |
| Bowling average | 22.11 |
| 5 wickets in innings | 0 |
| 10 wickets in match | 0 |
| Best bowling | 3/42 |
| Catches/stumpings | 2/– |
- Source: CricketArchive, 20 March 2013

Richard Cecil Denis Compton (born 29 March 1956) is a retired South African cricketer.

Compton was the third son of the English Test cricketer Denis Compton, Denis's second son with his second wife Valerie Platt. He was born in London and brought up in South Africa from 1960.

A right-handed batsman and right-arm fast-medium bowler, he represented Natal in seven first-class matches in the Howa Bowl, five in 1978/79 and two in 1980/81. He scored 99 runs at an average of 9.00 and took eighteen wickets at an average of 22.11, with best bowling figures of 3/42 in the first innings against Western Province in February 1979.

His brother Patrick also played first-class cricket for Natal, and his uncle Leslie, Denis's brother, played for Middlesex (and for Arsenal and England at football).

His son Nick captained Harrow in 2001, played first-class cricket for Middlesex (2001–2010 and 2015 to 2018) and Somerset (2010–2014). Nick made his test debut for England in 2012 against India.
