= Nick Compton =

English cricketer (born 1983)

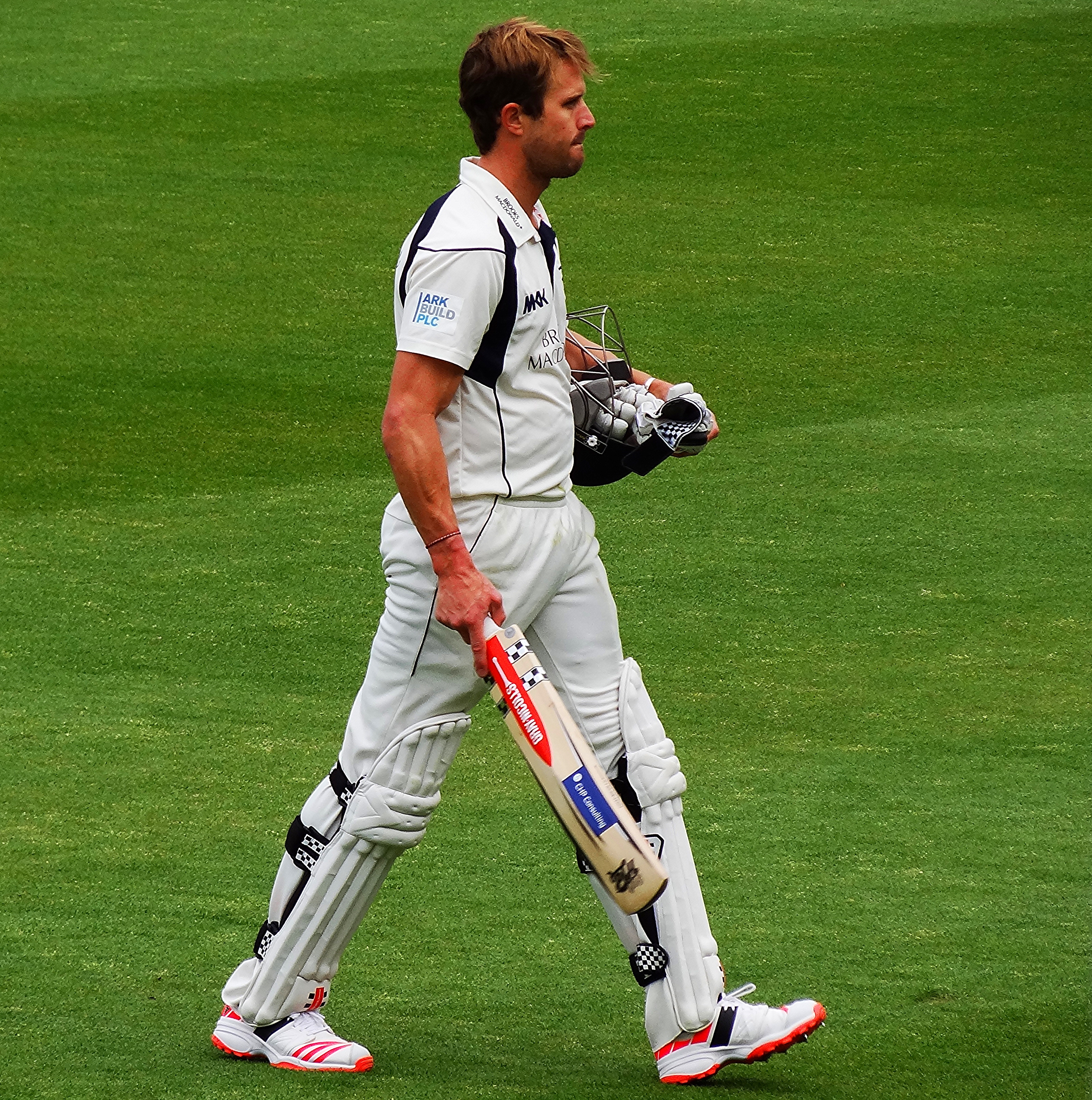
- Compton in 2015

Personal information
- Full name: Nicholas Richard Denis Compton
- Born: 26 June 1983 (age 43); Durban, Natal Province, South Africa
- Nickname: Compo
- Height: 6 ft 2 in (1.88 m)
- Batting: Right-handed
- Bowling: Right-arm off break
- Role: Batsman
- Relatives: Denis Compton (grandfather); Leslie Compton (grand-uncle); Richard Compton (father); Patrick Compton (uncle); Ben Compton (cousin)

International information
- National side: England (2012–2016)
- Test debut (cap 654): 15 November 2012 v India
- Last Test: 9 June 2016 v Sri Lanka

Domestic team information
- Years: Team
- 2001–2009: Middlesex
- 2010–2014: Somerset
- 2010: Mashonaland Eagles
- 2013: → Worcestershire (on loan)
- 2015–2018: Middlesex
- 2018: Sri Lanka Ports Authority

Career statistics
Competition	Test	FC	LA	T20
Matches	16	194	121	87
Runs scored	775	12,168	3,174	1,318
Batting average	28.70	40.42	35.26	19.67
100s/50s	2/2	27/59	6/20	0/7
Top score	117	254*	131	78
Balls bowled	–	182	61	–
Wickets	–	3	1	–
Bowling average	–	76.33	53.00	–
5 wickets in innings	–	0	0	–
10 wickets in match	–	0	0	–
Best bowling	–	1/1	1/0	–
Catches/stumpings	7/–	98/–	47/–	31/–
- Source: ESPNcricinfo, 21 July 2018

Nicholas Richard Denis Compton (born 26 June 1983) is a South African-born English former Test and first-class cricketer who most recently played for Middlesex County Cricket Club. The grandson of Denis Compton, he represented England in 16 Test matches.

A right-handed top order batsman and occasional right-arm off spin bowler, he made his List-A debut for Middlesex in 2001 and made his first-class debut three years later. A move to Somerset in 2010 saw Compton establish himself as a consistent scorer in a strong top order and following a prolific domestic season he made his England Test debut against India in November 2012.

In April 2013, the Wisden Cricketers' Almanack named Compton as one of their five Wisden Cricketers of the Year. He made a guest appearance for Worcestershire during the 2013 season.

Compton left Somerset to return to Middlesex at the end of the 2014 season. On 23 June 2016, Compton announced that he would be taking an extended break from the game, following his disappointing performances in the Test series against Sri Lanka. He returned to first-class cricket in August 2016. He retired in 2018.

== Early years and personal life ==
Compton was born and raised in Durban, Natal Province, South Africa, the son of former first-class cricketer Richard Compton and Zimbabwean mother Glynis who had backgrounds in public relations and journalism. Compton was immersed in cricket from an early age: he is the grandson of English test cricketer and Arsenal footballer Denis Compton and the great-nephew of established first-class cricketer and fellow Arsenal footballer Leslie Compton.

Compton's father Richard and uncle Patrick both played first-class cricket for Natal in South Africa. Compton moved to England while in his teens and attended Harrow School on a sports scholarship scheme where he was mentored by housemaster David Elleray. Compton impressed with a hatful of centuries for the school playing as captain and was prolific during the 2000 season for Middlesex's Under-19 side.

Having only just turned 18, Compton played for an ECB Schools side against West Indies Under-19s in three matches playing as an opening batsman, top scoring for the side in the third match with 74. A month later, he represented England Under-18s during the same tour, on this occasion scoring 42 playing at number three.

Compton began a social science degree at Durham University, matriculating at Hatfield College. However, a persistent groin problem, which eventually led to surgery, curtailed his cricket and forced him to withdraw from the course.

== First-class career ==
Compton's batting statistics in his first spell with Middlesex
	Matches	Runs	Average	100/50	Highest score
First-class	51	2,834	34.14	8/11	190
List A	53	1,429	40.82	4/5	131
Twenty20	29	252	11.45	0/1	50*

Upon completing his A levels at Harrow in June 2001, Compton joined Middlesex on a summer contract, and entered into the record books in his debut Second XI Championship match, Compton was the last of five batsman out in six balls bowled by Glamorgan paceman Alex Wharf.

Compton made his Middlesex first-team debut in the Norwich Union League at the end of the 2001 season, batting at six he scored just 6 runs from 9 deliveries in a 40 run defeat by Glamorgan. His promising performances for Middlesex's Under-19s and Second XI led him to receive the NBC Denis Compton Award, named after his grandfather, awarded to the most promising Middlesex player for 2001. The following winter, he was selected for the England Under-19s squad to take part in the ICC Under-19 World Cup in January and February 2002. Compton played in five of England's six matches as they reached the second group stage, Compton scoring 133 runs with one 50 at an average of 23.

In July 2002, Compton made his U19 Test match debut against India, but made a total of just six runs from his two innings opening the batting. He had to wait until August for his next first-team appearance where he played four further Norwich Union League, impressing in reaching his maiden one day half-century with an 86 not out against Lancashire. His promise saw him awarded Middlesex's NBC Denis Compton award for the second consecutive year. Compton did not play at all for the Middlesex first team during the 2003 season due to injury and made his first-class debut against Cambridge University Centre of Cricketing Excellence in May 2004, Compton played a further three matches in the County Championship that season, in addition to ten one day matches and his Twenty20 debut. He only played in one first-class match in 2005 but scored his debut half-century in the match against Cambridge UCCE. In the winter of that year he would continue to hone his skills by playing domestic club cricket in Durban for Berea Rovers, the former local club of South African-born England cricketer Kevin Pietersen.

He established himself in 2006, with a string of strong scores, including six centuries, and was award a county cap by the Middlesex in that season. His breakthrough season saw him score 1,315 runs at an average of 46.96, topping Middlesex's first-class runs charts, with his highest score of 190 coming in the County Championship match against Durham in July helping Middlesex to draw the match after being forced to follow-on. This breakthrough saw Compton awarded the NBC Denis Compton Award for a third time in 2006. Compton's good form saw him selected to tour with the England A team in Bangladesh in 2006–07. His highest score in a first-class match was 92 against Bangladesh A as he topped the England A averages with 140 runs at 46.66, though he did hit 152* in one of the minor tour matches.

=== Later Middlesex career ===
The 2007 season saw a dip in form for Compton scoring less than 400 runs in first-class cricket with just three fifties, including featuring for the Marylebone Cricket Club (MCC) against County Champions Sussex. Although his one-day form improved with his first List A century in the 2007 Friends Provident Trophy against Sussex in June 2007, scoring 110 not out. During the 2008 season Compton only played five first-class matches scoring just 68 runs at an average of 8.50, thus the 2009 season was a marked improvement top scoring in first-class cricket for Middlesex with 860 runs including two centuries and three half-centuries.

In one-day cricket Compton was in fine form with three centuries and 694 runs at an average of 77.11, and a highest score of 131 against Kent. Compton rejected an improved two-year contract with Middlesex acting on a verbal agreement with Angus Fraser, Middlesex's managing director of cricket, when he signed a new contract a year ago, that he would be free to move on if he wished at the end of the season.

=== Move to Somerset ===
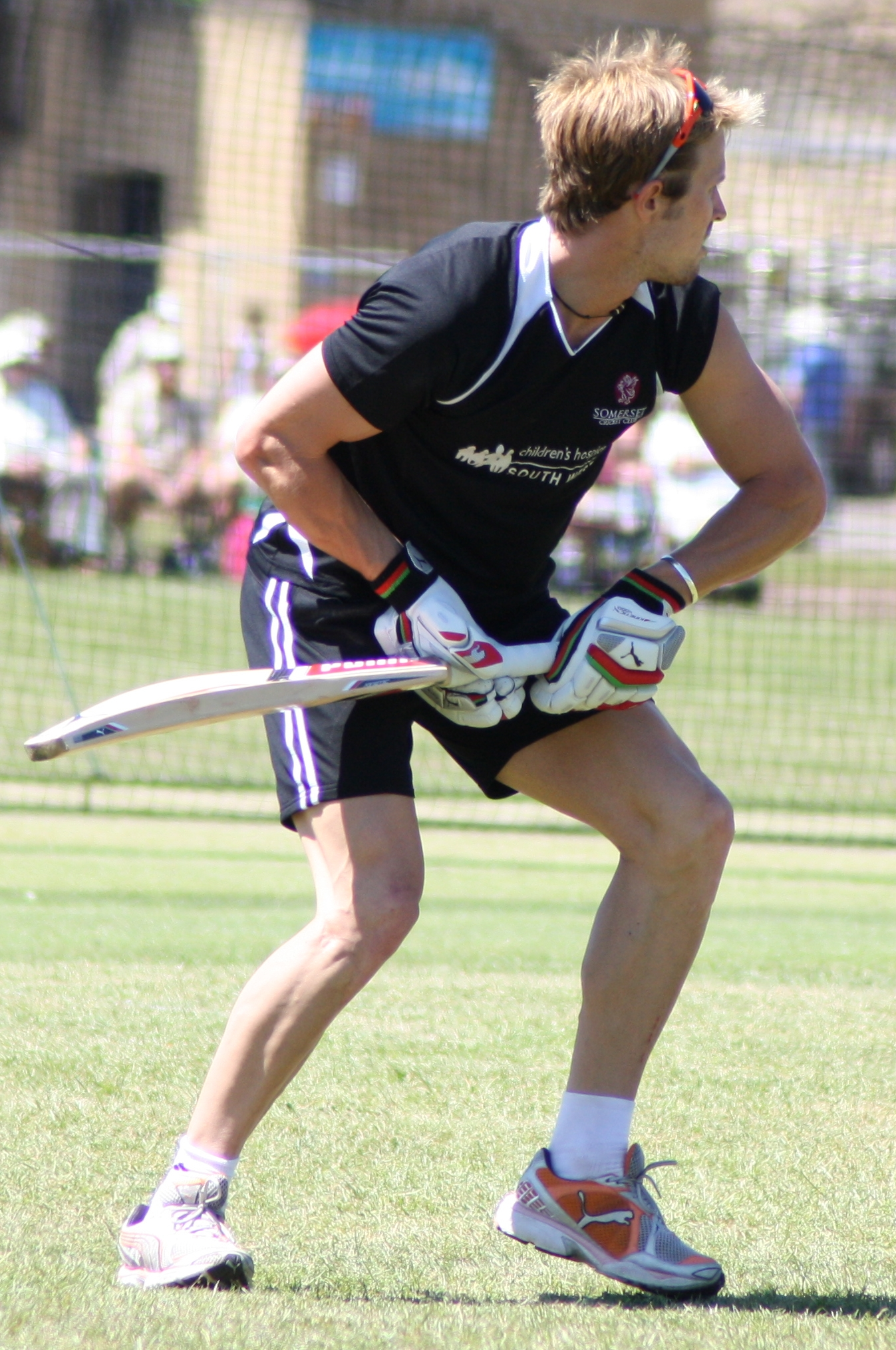
Compton training prior to a CB40 match against Worcestershire.

Compton's batting statistics with Somerset
	Matches	Runs	Average	100/50	Highest score
First-class	67	5,140	55.87	11/28	254*
List A	50	1,287	32.17	1/12	104
Twenty20	43	706	22.77	0/2	74

Having left Middlesex because he wanted a fresh challenge, Compton subsequently signed for Somerset on a multi-year contract, where he was expected to bat in the top three. Compton enjoyed a moderately successful first season in 2010 for Somerset, in first-class cricket only scoring 465 runs but in one day cricket Compton scored six fifties helping Somerset to the 2010 Clydesdale Bank 40 final against Warwickshire and recorded his highest score of 74 in Twenty20 cricket.

Compton spent the first half of the 2010–11 season with Mashonaland Eagles in Zimbabwe, impressing in all forms of cricket scoring 209 runs in three first-class matches at an average of 41.80, scoring 204 runs in three one day matches at an average of 102, and scoring three fifties in six Twenty20 matches including matching his highest score of 74.

He started the 2011 season well for Somerset with a one-day century in the 2011 Clydesdale Bank 40 against the Unicorns on 1 May 2011, and just over a week later scored his first ever double century in first-class cricket with 254* against Durham. Compton's first-class form continued with him scoring 1,098 runs at an average of 57.78 and being awarded his county cap for Somerset. The end of the season saw Compton helping Somerset against the odds to the semi-final of the 2011 Champions League Twenty20 in India.

With the earliest-ever start to a first-class cricket season, Compton took advantage by scoring 236 against Cardiff MCCU on 1/2 April 2012. This was the second earliest double-century in English cricket (after James Hildreth), and Compton's partnership of 450 with Hildreth for the second wicket set a new first-class record for Somerset.

Compton's good form continued with a second double-century against Nottinghamshire and having amassed 685 runs by 27 April, with this weight of runs earning him a recall to the England Lions for the tour match against the West Indies.

Compton only scored 21 runs for the Lions but still appeared to be within range of becoming the first batsman to reach 1,000 first-class runs before the end of May for 25 years, before a washout on the second afternoon of Somerset's match against Worcestershire left him stranded on 950 runs. He nevertheless reached the landmark with a century the next day to become the earliest batsman to reach this milestone in 24 years. Compton's good first-class form continued until injury hampered his end to the 2012 season, while playing for the England Lions against Australia A in August 2012 despite scoring 46 in the first innings of the match he was ruled out of the rest of the match with back spasms. Compton finally returned to cricket on 6 September playing as a guest for Yorkshire Second XI against Somerset Second XI in their second innings scoring 39 and retiring not out in an innings defeat for Yorkshire.

Compton returned to the Somerset side for their final County Championship match against Worcestershire, Compton scored 155* in his only innings in the match as Somerset wrapped up the runners-up spot in the competition, the century meant Compton finished the English cricket season with 1,494 runs in first-class cricket at an average of 99.60. Compton was the only English batsman to score 1,000 runs in the County Championship and won the PCA Player of the Year award for the first time.

At the end of the 2014 season, Compton left Somerset having become disillusioned with the game and wanting to return to living in London.

=== Return to Middlesex ===
On 12 December 2014, Middlesex County Cricket Club confirmed the return of Compton on a three-year contract. In January 2017 his contract was extended to the end of the 2018 season. However, he did not make a single appearance in the 2018 season.

== International career ==
=== 2012 India ===
Following the retirement of Andrew Strauss and the exclusion of Kevin Pietersen, Compton's weight of runs was enough to earn him a first call-up to the England Test squad for the tour to India in winter 2012–13. Compton made his England debut opening the batting with captain Alastair Cook in their first tour match against India A, but made a third ball duck in England's only innings. The second tour match against Mumbai A saw Compton open the batting with his rival for the Test opening spot Joe Root. Compton scored just one run in the first innings, but completed his first half century for England in the second innings, as he finished 64 not out. In the third and final tour match against Haryana, Compton completed half centuries in both innings of the match making 74 and 79 respectively, which included a 166-run opening partnership with Alastair Cook in the first innings.

Compton made his test debut in the first Test of the series in Ahmedabad. He made 9 off 53 balls in the first innings, before being bowled by an off break by Ravichandran Ashwin and then made 37 runs in a first-wicket, second innings partnership of 123 with Alastair Cook, before being given out lbw to Zaheer Khan. Compton again struggled in the second Test, making 29 in the first innings. However, he scored an unbeaten 30 in the second innings to help England win the second Test by 10 wickets. Compton made his maiden Test half-century in the 3rd Test at Eden Gardens, going on to his highest test score of 57 before being dismissed lbw by Pragyan Ojha. In the fourth Test he made scores of 3 and 34 as England drew the match and won the Test series in India 2–1, which was their first series victory in India since the 1984–85 tour, with Compton featuring in all four of the Test matches therefore earning himself an ECB incremental contract. Compton finished the series having scored 208 runs in his eight Test innings at an average of 34.66. Compton had helped Cook post four successive 50 partnerships ensuring decent platforms for England and according to ESPNcricinfo's George Dobell he rated Compton's series as a 7/10 and that "while he proved his ability to occupy the crease, some doubt remains about his ability to press on and dominate."

=== 2013 New Zealand ===
Compton's performance in India was enough to maintain his place in England's Test squad for the tour to New Zealand in March 2013. Following a duck in the first innings of the first Test of the series Compton responded with his maiden Test century, scoring 117 as England drew the Test match. He proceeded to make a more fluent second century, scoring exactly 100, in the second Test match. Compton finished the drawn series as England's third highest run-scorer with 232 runs at an average of 46.40.

Compton was named as one of the five Wisden Cricketers of the Year in 2013, recognising his achievements during the previous English season. Compton returned to County Cricket in late April 2013, with a century and half-century against county champions Warwickshire, and maintained his place in the England test squad for the home series against New Zealand. Compton fared badly in the two test home series scoring just 39 runs in 4 innings with a high score of just 16. He performed particularly poorly in the first Test, making scores of 1 and 7, although England still went on to win the match and the series 2–0. This failure led to renewed calls from the media for Compton to be dropped for the Ashes in favour of Joe Root, but Compton returned to first-class cricket for Somerset with a century against Durham, and then backed this up with a vital half-century at Derbyshire that guided Somerset to their first victory of the season.

Despite this form Compton was dropped by England for the Ashes warm-up against Essex in favour of Joe Root, with Compton omitted from the squad and national selector Geoff Miller, describing Root as "currently the best opening partner" for Alastair Cook. On his 30th birthday, Compton's form continued with a defiant 81 for Somerset against the touring Australians at Taunton. Compton was rewarded for his form as the ECB arranged for him to play as a guest for Worcestershire in their tour match against Australia as a further audition for his Ashes spot. Despite still being in the selector's thoughts, Compton did not play any part in the series.

=== 2015/16 South Africa ===
In November 2015, after more than two years out of the side Compton was recalled to the Test squad for the tour to South Africa. In the first test in his home town of Durban, Compton, batting at number 3 in the order, scored 85 runs from 236 balls in the first innings, and shared a century stand with James Taylor to help England recover from 49–3 to 303 all out.

Compton fell just short of another half-century in the second innings, being caught behind by AB de Villiers from a Morné Morkel delivery on 49. Compton continued his good form in the first innings of the second Test, scoring 45 in the first innings. Both England and South Africa posted over 600 in their first innings, and the match ended in a draw. Compton was dismissed for 15 in England's second innings. In the third Test he made 26 in the first innings but was out for a duck in the second innings as England successfully chased down a modest victory target to take an unassailable 2–0 lead in the series. He scored just 25 runs in the fourth Test, which England went on to lose, although they won the series 2–1.

=== 2016 Sri Lanka ===
In May 2016 Compton was announced in the England test squad for the first match against Sri Lanka. Many were suggesting that this would be his last chance for England, but he scored a first innings duck, after being caught behind of the bowling of debutant Dasun Shanaka. After England recorded an emphatic victory in the first match, they named an unchanged side for the second and Compton kept his place for the second Test. He was dismissed for just nine in the first innings, but looked in better touch in the second innings and scored an unbeaten 22 to help England to a nine wicket victory. In the final match of the series he was out for one in England's first innings, before making 19 in the second, as the match ended in a draw. Having not featured in a single match of the 2018 season for Middlesex, Compton announced his retirement from all forms of cricket in October 2018. Nick is currently (February 2024) playing for the very successful England Seniors over 40 cricket team in the Seniors World Cup in India.

== Post-retirement life ==
After retiring, Compton became a professional photographer.
