= New Zealand cricket team in England in 2013 =

	England	New Zealand
- Dates: 4 May 2013 – 27 June 2013
Captains	Alastair Cook (Test & ODI); Eoin Morgan (T20I)	Brendon McCullum

Test series
- Result: England won the 2-match series 2–0
Most runs	Joe Root (243)	Ross Taylor (142)
Most wickets	Stuart Broad (12)	Tim Southee (12)
- Player of the series: Joe Root (Eng); Tim Southee (NZ)

One Day International series
- Results: New Zealand won the 3-match series 2–1
Most runs	Jonathan Trott (183)	Martin Guptill (330)
Most wickets	James Anderson (5)	Mitchell McClenaghan (8)
- Player of the series: Martin Guptill (NZ)

Twenty20 International series
- Results: New Zealand won the 2-match series 1–0
Most runs	Luke Wright (52)	Brendon McCullum (68)
Most wickets	Luke Wright (2)	Mitchell McClenaghan (2)

The New Zealand national cricket team was in England from 4 May to 27 June 2013 for a tour consisting of two Test matches, three One Day Internationals and two Twenty20 International matches. The New Zealand team also competed in the 2013 ICC Champions Trophy between the ODI series and T20I series. The tour followed England's tour of New Zealand two months earlier.

Before the tour, there were fears that a number of New Zealand players might have been unavailable for the start of the tour due to a schedule overlap with the 2013 Indian Premier League. The contract between New Zealand Cricket and the players' association entitles the players to five weeks of IPL competition as New Zealand cricketers earn more money from IPL play than from international play for New Zealand Cricket.

== Squads ==
Tests		ODIs		T20Is	
England	New Zealand	England	New Zealand	England	New Zealand
Alastair Cook (c); James Anderson; Jonny Bairstow (wk); Ian Bell; Tim Bresnan; Stuart Broad; Nick Compton; Steven Finn; Matt Prior (wk); Joe Root; Graeme Swann; Jonathan Trott	Brendon McCullum (c & wk); Trent Boult; Doug Bracewell; Dean Brownlie; Peter Fulton; Mark Gillespie; Martin Guptill; Tom Latham (wk); Bruce Martin; Hamish Rutherford; Tim Southee; Ross Taylor; Neil Wagner; BJ Watling (wk); Kane Williamson	Alastair Cook (c); James Anderson; Jonny Bairstow (wk); Ian Bell; Ravi Bopara; Tim Bresnan; Stuart Broad; Jos Buttler (wk); Jade Dernbach; Steven Finn; Eoin Morgan; Boyd Rankin; Joe Root; Graeme Swann; James Tredwell; Jonathan Trott; Chris Woakes	Brendon McCullum (c & wk); Trent Boult; Doug Bracewell; Grant Elliott; Andrew Ellis; James Franklin; Martin Guptill; Mitchell McClenaghan; Nathan McCullum; Kyle Mills; Colin Munro; Luke Ronchi (wk); Tim Southee; Ross Taylor; Daniel Vettori; Kane Williamson	Eoin Morgan (c); Gary Ballance; Ravi Bopara; Danny Briggs; Jos Buttler (wk); Jade Dernbach; Alex Hales; Michael Lumb; Kevin Pietersen; Boyd Rankin; Ben Stokes; James Tredwell; Chris Woakes; Luke Wright	Brendon McCullum (c); Corey Anderson; Doug Bracewell; Ian Butler; James Franklin; Martin Guptill; Ronnie Hira; Tom Latham (wk); Mitchell McClenaghan; Nathan McCullum; Kyle Mills; Colin Munro; Hamish Rutherford; Ross Taylor

== Tour matches ==
=== First-class: Derbyshire v New Zealanders ===
4–6 May 2013
Scorecard

New Zealanders	v	Derbyshire
289/5d (76 overs); BJ Watling 77* (133); Mark Footitt 4/65 (18 overs)		154 (52 overs); Wes Durston 46 (65); Doug Bracewell 4/28 (15 overs)
199/5d (48 overs); BJ Watling 61* (100); Mark Footitt 2/19 (10 overs)		227 (67.4 overs); Dan Redfern 58 (70); Neil Wagner 5/45 (18 overs)

New Zealanders won by 107 runs
County Ground, Derby
Umpires: Neil Bainton (Eng) and Nigel Cowley (Eng)

- Derbyshire won the toss and elected to field.

=== First-class: England Lions v New Zealanders ===
9–12 May 2013
Scorecard

New Zealanders	v	England Lions
285 (74.5 overs); Hamish Rutherford 126 (155); Toby Roland-Jones 4/54 (12.5 overs)		444/7 (114 overs); Joe Root 179 (276); Trent Boult 3/86 (25 overs)

Match drawn
Grace Road, Leicester
Umpires: Jeremy Lloyds (Eng) and Paul Pollard (Eng)

- England Lions won the toss and elected to field.

=== T20: Kent Spitfires v New Zealanders ===
22 June 2013
10:45
Scorecard

New Zealanders; 185/7 (20 overs)	v	Kent Spitfires; 143/7 (20 overs)
Martin Guptill 56 (44); Mitchell Claydon 5/31 (4 overs)		Darren Stevens 41 (33); Ian Butler 2/28 (4 overs)

New Zealanders won by 42 runs
St Lawrence Ground, Canterbury
Umpires: Mike Burns (Eng) and Nick Cook (Eng)

- Kent Spitfires won the toss and elected to field.
- Fabian Cowdrey (Kent) made his T20 debut.

== Test series ==
=== 1st Test ===
16–20 May 2013
Scorecard

England	v	New Zealand
232 (112.2 overs); Jonny Bairstow 41 (107); Tim Southee 4/58 (28.2 overs)		207 (69 overs); Ross Taylor 66 (72); James Anderson 5/47 (24 overs)
213 (68.3 overs); Joe Root 71 (120); Tim Southee 6/50 (19 overs)		68 (22.3 overs); Neil Wagner 17 (24); Stuart Broad 7/44 (11 overs)

England won by 170 runs
Lord's Cricket Ground, London
Umpires: Aleem Dar (Pak) and Steve Davis (Aus)
Player of the match: Stuart Broad (Eng)

- England won the toss and elected to bat.
- Rain reduced play on Day 1 to 80 overs.
- Bad light reduced play on Day 2 to 83 overs.

The 1st Test started slowly, with England scoring just 160 runs in the 80 overs that were managed before rain curtailed the day's play. None of the four wickets taken during the day were for more than 40 runs, leaving Joe Root (25) and Jonny Bairstow (3) at the crease overnight. The pair added another 32 runs at the start of day 2 before the loss of Root's wicket in the 16th over of the day brought about a batting collapse; England went from 192/5 to 232 all out in the space of just under 18 overs, and none of the last five batsmen reached double figures.

James Anderson gave England a chance at a perfect response by taking the wickets of both New Zealand openers to join Ian Botham, Bob Willis and Fred Trueman as one of four English bowlers to have taken 300 Test wickets. New Zealand fought back through top-scorer Ross Taylor, who hit a fast-paced 66 off 72 balls before being trapped LBW to Anderson, and Kane Williamson, who ended the day unbeaten on 44. Dean Brownlie's was the last wicket of the day to fall, bringing captain Brendon McCullum to the crease with New Zealand on 153/4 at the close of play. However, McCullum lasted just five balls the following morning, caught behind for 2 runs off the bowling of Stuart Broad. It was the wicket of Williamson that spelled New Zealand's downfall, though, the last four wickets falling for 30 runs in fewer than 10 overs. Anderson's wicket of Bruce Martin gave him his fourth Test five-wicket haul at Lord's.

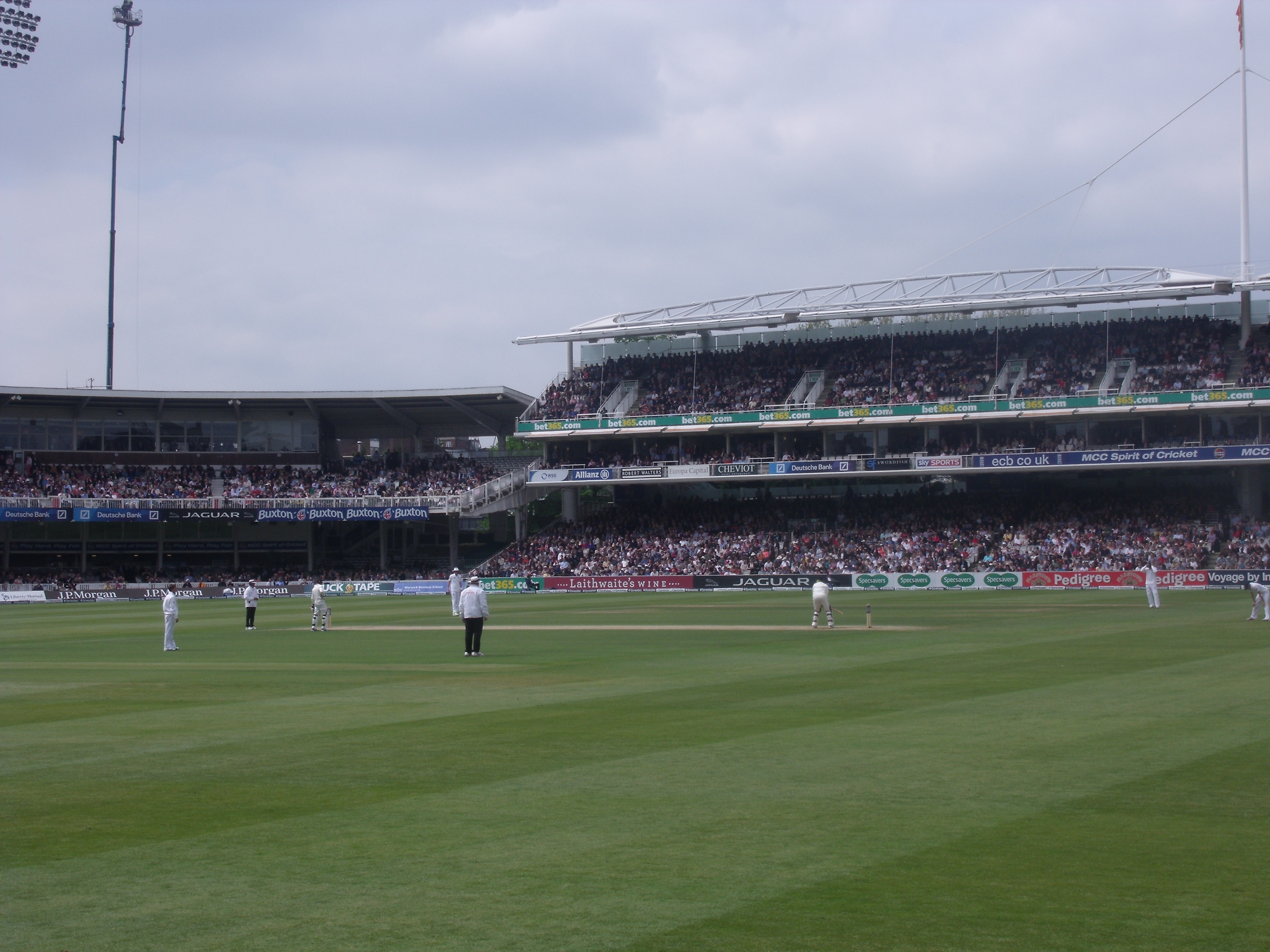
New Zealand bat during their second innings of the Lord's Test.

With a 25-run lead, England knew they would need to open up a decent margin over New Zealand in their second innings to take the match away from the tourists. Despite the loss of both captain Alastair Cook and Nick Compton in the first 10 overs, England started well, as Jonathan Trott and Joe Root built a third-wicket partnership of 123, the only century partnership in the match. However, the loss of Root for 71 with the last ball of the 50th over was the beginning of the end. Trott achieved his half-century in the following over, but Bairstow's wicket fell soon after, followed by Matt Prior, who picked up a pair off Tim Southee. Trott was out himself two overs before the close of play, and England finished on 180/6. On the fourth morning, Southee went on to tear through the English lower order, which included an out-of-sorts Ian Bell, who had spent most of the previous day recovering from flu-like symptoms. England were eventually all out for 213 in just 68.3 overs, despite having been 159/2 in the 50th. Only Stuart Broad showed any resistance, scoring an unbeaten 26, and it was a sign of things to come.

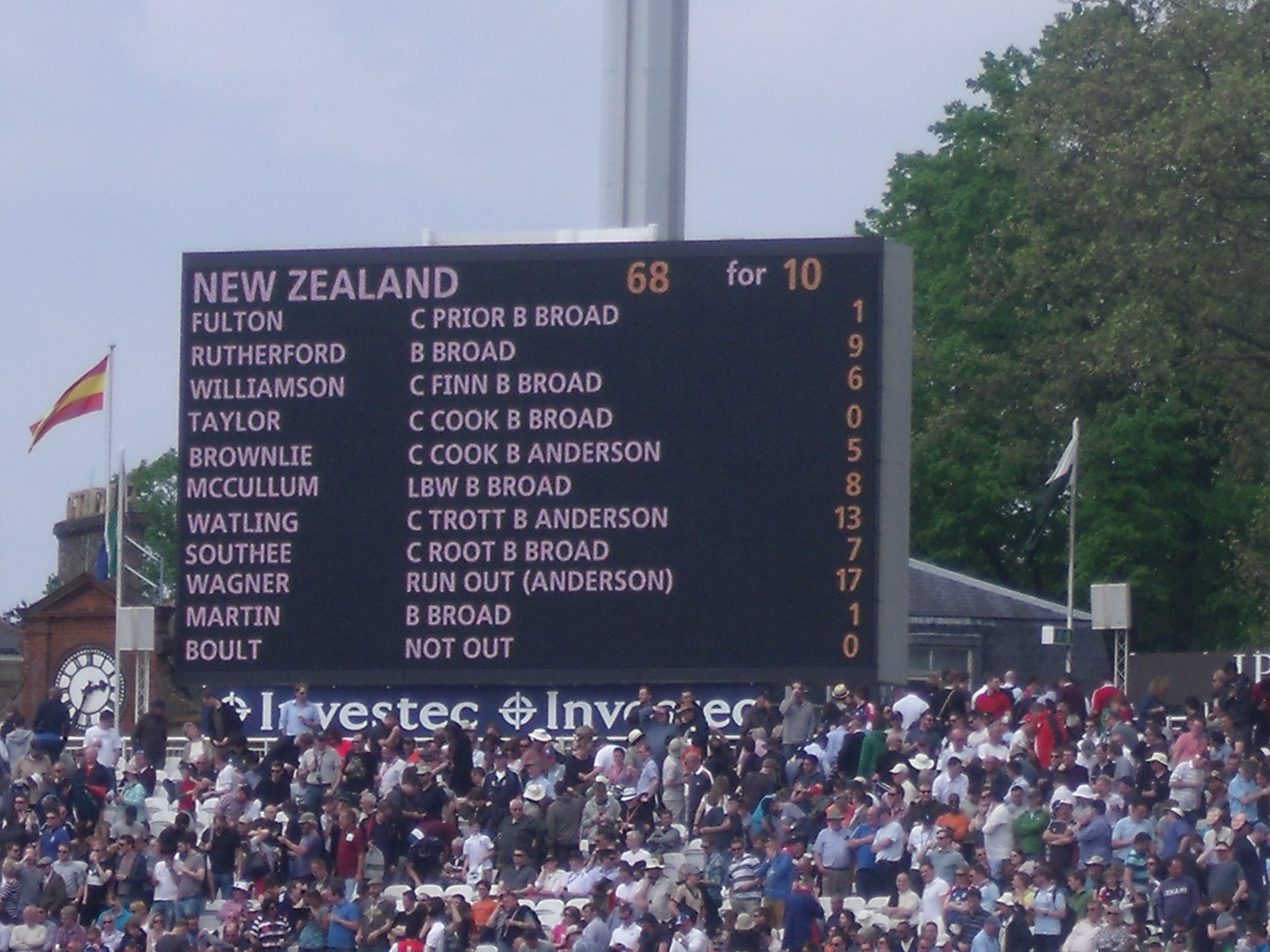
New Zealand only managed 68 runs in their second innings of the Lord's Test match.

New Zealand were set a target of 239 for victory, and although that would have made it the highest-scoring innings in the match, they had five sessions in which to do it. However, what followed was a master-class in bowling from Broad, who took seven wickets for 44 runs in just 11 overs – his best Test figures – as New Zealand were bowled out for 68, their sixth-lowest score in Tests against England. Only BJ Watling and Neil Wagner managed to make it into double figures, theirs being two of the three wickets that Broad did not manage to take. Watling was not helped by a knee injury he had picked up on day 3 that meant McCullum had to keep wicket for the rest of the innings, but he nevertheless came out to bat, only to be caught in the slips off Anderson for 13. Wagner's wicket was the last to fall; it looked as though he would be caught after hitting the ball straight up in the air to long leg, but the fielder missed the catch. In the confusion that followed, the ball was thrown back to Anderson at the bowler's end with Wagner stranded mid-pitch in the middle of his second run. With that, the day's play concluded with 14 wickets in less than two sessions and England went 1–0 up in the two-match series.

=== 2nd Test ===
24–28 May 2013
Scorecard

England	v	New Zealand
354 (99 overs); Joe Root 104 (167); Trent Boult 5/57 (22 overs)		174 (43.4 overs); Peter Fulton 28 (48); Graeme Swann 4/42 (9 overs)
287/5d (76 overs); Alastair Cook 130 (190); Kane Williamson 3/68 (24 overs)		220 (76.3 overs); Ross Taylor 70 (121); Graeme Swann 6/90 (32 overs)

England won by 247 runs
Headingley, Leeds
Umpires: Steve Davis (Aus) and Marais Erasmus (SA)
Player of the match: Graeme Swann (Eng)

- England won the toss and elected to bat.
- No play possible on Day 1 due to rain.
- Rain delayed the start of play and extended the lunch interval on Day 5.
- Joe Root (Eng) scored his maiden Test century.

New Zealand made a couple of forced changes for the second Test, with Brendon McCullum keeping wicket in place of the injured BJ Watling, Martin Guptill filling Watling's role with the bat, while Doug Bracewell came in for spinner Bruce Martin to form a four-man seam attack. The first day was completely washed out by rain, which, although there were some breaks in the cloud, was never away long enough to allow the toss to be made. With play abandoned before 4 p.m., the match was effectively turned into a four-day game. After losing Compton (1) early on day 2, England recovered well, with Cook and Trott putting on another 50 runs before both were dismissed in consecutive balls in the last two overs before lunch; however, this only brought Joe Root to the crease, and he proceeded to add 104 more runs for his maiden Test century, becoming the first Yorkshireman to do so at Headingley. Root was out to the first delivery with the new ball, but not before he and fellow Yorkshireman Jonny Bairstow had added 124 for the fifth wicket. Bairstow (64) went next, followed by Broad for a second-ball duck, but Prior and Swann combined to get England to 337/7 by the end of the day. England's tail only lasted another nine overs on day 3, enough to round the innings off for 354 runs. Trent Boult took the last two wickets of Steven Finn (6) and Anderson (0) to complete a five-wicket haul.

New Zealand started their response well, Fulton and Rutherford putting on 55 runs for the opening wicket; however, the introduction of Finn into the bowling attack ended the openers' resistance shortly before the lunch break. New Zealand then quickly went from 62/2 to 122/9, as Swann was able to exploit the rough patches left by the New Zealand bowlers' foot marks to take four wickets. Wagner and Boult were able to restore some respectability to the scorecard with a partnership of 52, including Boult hitting Swann for three consecutive sixes in one over. By the time New Zealand were all out, they had reached a total of 174 – still 180 runs behind, not enough to reach the follow-on target (the margin reduced to 150 runs due to the shortened match). However, despite his bowlers' dominance with ball in hand, England captain Alastair Cook elected not to enforce the follow-on and England came out to bat again, much to the surprise of some commentators.

The England openers were in stark contrast to one another as the innings began; as Cook reached his 30th Test half-century off just 63 balls, Compton was stranded on 7 runs for 22 balls before getting out off a bat-pad to part-time spinner Kane Williamson. After two centuries in a row in New Zealand, it was Compton's sixth consecutive Test innings in which he had failed to reach 20 runs. Cook (88*) and Trott (11*) then batted out the rest of the day to get England to 116/1 at the close. The pair continued on the morning of the fourth day, reaching a total of 134 for the second wicket (the biggest partnership of the series) before Cook was out caught to Williamson for 130 – his 25th Test hundred. Trott himself reached 76 before edging a wide ball from Wagner to a diving McCullum, and Root and Bairstow each added quarter-centuries en route to a declaration at 287/5.

With that, England's lead was set at 467, necessitating a record-breaking innings from New Zealand if they were to win the game. Realistically, with heavy weather expected on the final day, their only hope was to hold out for a draw. However, they still had the best part of five sessions to negotiate to do so, and the loss of Fulton (5) to Broad in the eighth over was not the best of starts. Swann then claimed the wickets of Williamson (3) and Rutherford (42) before the tea break. New Zealand lost three more before the end of the day; Brownlie (25) went first to Finn after a 79-run stand with Taylor, who made a valuable 70 before he and Guptill were dismissed by Swann as the day drew to a close with New Zealand still 309 behind on 158, with just four wickets in hand. The weather on the final day was as expected, with rain delaying the start by 45 minutes. It was only delaying the inevitable, however, as Broad caught McCullum off his own bowling in the third full over of the day, and Swann broke up a 56-run partnership between Southee and Bracewell, tempting Southee into an edge to slip for his 15th Test five-for before another bout of rain forced an early lunch. Swann got his 10th wicket of the match shortly after the resumption of play, dismissing Bracewell for 19, before Anderson wrapped up the victory and the series with the wicket of Boult for a 24-ball duck.

== ODI series ==
=== 1st ODI ===
31 May 2013
10:45
Scorecard

England; 227/9 (50 overs)	v	New Zealand; 231/5 (46.5 overs)
Jonathan Trott 37 (53); Tim Southee 3/37 (10 overs)		Martin Guptill 103* (123); James Anderson 3/31 (9 overs)

New Zealand won by 5 wickets
Lord's Cricket Ground, London
Umpires: Aleem Dar (Pak) and Richard Illingworth (Eng)
Player of the match: Martin Guptill (NZ)

- New Zealand won the toss and elected to field.

England went into the 1st ODI missing two of their four-man bowling attack, with Stuart Broad (knee) and Finn (shin) ruled out through injury. Tim Bresnan and Jade Dernbach took their places in the side, Dernbach only having been called up to the squad the previous day as cover for Bresnan. New Zealand were also affected by injury, as Trent Boult was put out of action by a torn side muscle.

New Zealand won the toss and elected to field first, conditions tending to favour the bowlers early on. England started consistently, as openers Alastair Cook and Ian Bell put on 45 runs in the first 10 overs. However, the end of the first powerplay worked in New Zealand's favour, as two balls later, Bell was caught behind off the bowling of Tim Southee. Cook did not last much longer, falling to a similar ball for 30 runs. Jonathan Trott and Joe Root attempted to right the situation by adding another 67 runs for the third wicket as the innings passed its halfway point, only for Root to be bowled by Nathan McCullum attempting a reverse sweep on 30. McCullum then got Trott for 37 in his next over, before Eoin Morgan was caught out off a top-edged hook from Mitchell McClenaghan. After the loss of Jos Buttler for 14, Chris Woakes and Tim Bresnan provided valuable contributions of 36 and 25 respectively, before Graeme Swann added a quick-fire 15 off 14 balls, falling to the last ball of the innings with England on a modest 227/9.

Despite the low target for New Zealand to chase, England got off to a perfect start with two wickets for James Anderson in the first over, both Luke Ronchi and Kane Williamson getting out for ducks. However, Martin Guptill was able to hold his end, and half-centuries from him and Ross Taylor meant a 120-run stand for the third wicket. Taylor managed to add just four more runs beyond his fifty before Anderson took his third wicket of the innings in the 26th over. Grant Elliott managed to survive an LBW appeal on 14 to go on to make a useful 27 before falling to Swann. The loss of captain Brendon McCullum for 5 shortly afterwards did nothing to stop New Zealand's march to victory, as a four from Guptill with the scores level brought up his century and gave the Black Caps the win with just over three overs to play.

=== 2nd ODI ===
2 June 2013
10:45
Scorecard

New Zealand; 359/3 (50 overs)	v	England; 273 (44.1 overs)
Martin Guptill 189* (155); James Anderson 2/65 (10 overs)		Jonathan Trott 109* (104); Mitchell McClenaghan 3/35 (8.1 overs)

New Zealand won by 86 runs
Rose Bowl, Southampton
Umpires: Rob Bailey (Eng) and Steve Davis (Aus)
Player of the match: Martin Guptill (NZ)

- New Zealand won the toss and elected to bat.

England were again without Broad and Finn for the 2nd ODI, and so – despite adding former Ireland international Boyd Rankin to the squad – fielded the same 11 as in the 1st ODI. Meanwhile, New Zealand took the opportunity to rest Southee, bringing in Doug Bracewell in his place.

New Zealand won the toss and elected to bat, immediately demonstrating a reshuffling of their batting order, with Guptill facing the first ball from Anderson, presumably to protect Ronchi, who fell so quickly in the previous match. However, Ronchi was soon on strike and just as soon on his way back to the pavilion, Anderson clean-bowling him with the last ball of the third over. Guptill was almost out himself on 13 in the 10th over, but his low pull shot was dropped by Trott at midwicket. It was a mistake that would prove costly for England, as Guptill went on to put on successive 100-run stands for the second and third wickets with Williamson (55) and Taylor (60) on his way to a New Zealand record 189 not out off 155 balls. Captain Brendon McCullum put on 40 runs himself to close out New Zealand's 50 overs with the team on 359/3.

England's response was reasonable, though they never looked like threatening New Zealand's massive total. Cook and Bell put on 50 runs together before Cook was bowled by Kyle Mills for 34 at the end of the eighth over, and Bell followed soon after for 25, caught by James Franklin off Bracewell. Root and Morgan both went for scores in the 20s, but the tail was found wanting as only Woakes (13) and Anderson (28) from the last six batsmen managed to reach double-figures. Trott made a valiant attempt to make up for his dropped catch off Guptill earlier in the day with an unbeaten 109 off 104 balls, but with wickets falling all around him, it was too big a task for him to manage by himself. England were eventually bowled out for 273 with just under six overs left, giving New Zealand an 86-run victory and an unassailable lead in the series.

=== 3rd ODI ===
5 June 2013
14:00 (D/N)
Scorecard

England; 287/6 (50 overs)	v	New Zealand; 253 (46.3 overs)
Ian Bell 82 (96); Mitchell McClenaghan 3/54 (10 overs)		Ross Taylor 71 (84); James Tredwell 3/51 (9 overs)

England won by 34 runs
Trent Bridge, Nottingham
Umpires: Aleem Dar (Pak) and Richard Illingworth (Eng)
Player of the match: Jos Buttler (Eng)

- New Zealand won the toss and elected to field.

With the series decided and their first ICC Champions Trophy matches only a few days later, both England and New Zealand chose to reshuffle their sides for the final ODI. England dropped Dernbach and Woakes in favour of Ravi Bopara and James Tredwell, while Anderson and Swann were rested to make way for the returning Broad and Finn. New Zealand's changes were less pronounced, with Southee and Colin Munro coming in for Bracewell and Elliott, who had a tight calf muscle.

New Zealand won their third toss of the series and chose to put England in to bat. England started very slowly and the loss of Cook for a nine-ball duck in the third over did not help matters. However, his opening partner Bell was able to anchor the innings with a solid 82 off 96 balls, including half-century partnerships with Trott (37) and Root (33). Bell guided England from 3/1 to 153/3 before being tempted into a drive to mid-off by McClenaghan. The departure of Root and Bell in quick succession meant that both Bopara and Morgan were yet to score as the mandatory powerplay overs began; however, they both survived that five-over spell and went on to contribute vital runs to the total. With just over four overs to play, Bopara was caught out by Taylor for 28 while attempting to slog-sweep Williamson over deep midwicket. This brought Buttler to the crease for one of the most emphatic innings of recent history, scoring 47 runs off just 16 balls, including six fours and three sixes. Although Morgan was run out one short of his half-century, his quick-fire 62-run stand with Buttler meant that England closed out their 50 overs on 287/6.

New Zealand started their response quickly, but the reintroduction of Broad paid dividends for England when he got the wicket of Ronchi in the sixth over. It was Guptill who England had to watch out for, however, following his performances earlier in the series, but it was another newcomer to the England side, Tredwell, who put paid to the New Zealand opener's plans of going the entire series without getting out, bowling him with his fifth ball of the match for 38. Williamson (19) was next to go, trapped plumb LBW by Root for his first ODI wicket. Bresnan then got Munro for a golden duck, before Tredwell had McCullum caught behind for 6, and Franklin edged Broad to gully for 7. Taylor and Nathan McCullum managed to put on a 53-run partnership for the seventh wicket before Broad caught McCullum off the bowling of Bresnan. Three overs later, Finn had Southee for 15 and the contest was all but over; Taylor was still in, two runs away from his half-century, but with 92 runs still to get in 12 overs and only two wickets in hand, the task was too much for New Zealand. Taylor gave it his best shot, though, making it to 71 before holing out to Bresnan off the bowling of Tredwell, and Mills added 28 runs of his own, but McClenaghan was unable to hold his own end up for long and New Zealand were bowled out for 253, 35 runs from victory.

== ICC Champions Trophy ==
Following the third ODI, proceedings were delayed by the Champions Trophy, in which New Zealand and England were both drawn in Group A alongside Australia and Sri Lanka. Following victory over Sri Lanka and a wash-out against Australia, New Zealand met England at Cardiff in their final match of the group stage. England won the match and qualified for the semi-finals, while New Zealand were eliminated after Sri Lanka beat Australia the following day. England then went on to reach the final, which they lost narrowly to India in a match reduced to 20 overs per side.

== T20I series ==
=== 1st T20I ===
25 June 2013
18:30 (D/N)
Scorecard

New Zealand; 201/4 (20 overs)	v	England; 196/5 (20 overs)
Brendon McCullum 68 (48); Luke Wright 2/31 (4 overs)		Luke Wright 52 (34); Roneel Hira 1/34 (4 overs)

New Zealand won by 5 runs
The Oval, London
Umpires: Rob Bailey (Eng) and Richard Illingworth (Eng)
Player of the match: Hamish Rutherford (NZ)

- England won the toss and elected to field.

Only five players from England's Champions Trophy squad were selected for the T20Is. Among the new names in the squad were Kevin Pietersen, returning to international cricket for the first time since March, Zimbabwe-born Gary Ballance, and Boyd Rankin, who had previously played for Ireland in both the ODI and T20I forms of the game. Only Rankin made the matchday XI, and he made an immediate impact. England won the toss and opted to field, and captain Eoin Morgan – standing in for Stuart Broad – handed Rankin the opening over. With only his fourth ball, Rankin bowled to James Franklin and found the inside edge through to wicket-keeper Jos Buttler. With New Zealand at 1/1 after just four balls, the pressure was on, but Hamish Rutherford (62) and captain Brendon McCullum (68) managed to salvage the innings with a 114-run stand for the second wicket. A mid-innings bowling spell from Luke Wright broke the partnership, Wright taking the wickets of both men in the space of four overs. However, Ross Taylor and Tom Latham put on another 39 runs in the last four overs to get New Zealand to a total of 201/4 at the end of their 20 overs.

No team had ever managed to chase down a T20I score of more than 200 in England, and it had only been done three times anywhere in the world. Michael Lumb and Alex Hales got them off to a good start, reaching 50 runs in just 3.3 overs; however, Lumb was out to the very next ball, bowled by Nathan McCullum. Hales was joined at the wicket by Luke Wright, and the pair put on another 55 runs for the second wicket, before Hales holed out to Franklin at mid-wicket for 39. Morgan was next to go, his 7 runs off 10 balls making him the only England batsman to score at a rate of less than a run a ball, and he was followed in the very next over by Wright. However, Wright's 52 off 34 balls left England needing 63 off the last five overs. An unbeaten 30 from Ravi Bopara, Buttler's quick-fire 17 and a six off the first ball of the final over from Ben Stokes got England to within five runs of the New Zealand total, but in the end it was too little, too late and the tourists took a 1–0 lead in the series.

=== 2nd T20I ===
27 June 2013
18:30 (D/N)
Scorecard

England; 2/1 (0.2 overs)	v	New Zealand
Michael Lumb 2 (2); Mitchell McClenaghan 1/2 (0.2 overs)

No result
The Oval, London
Umpires: Richard Illingworth (Eng) and Tim Robinson (Eng)

- New Zealand won the toss and elected to field.
- Rain stopped play after two balls of the England innings.

== Broadcasters ==
Country	TV Broadcaster(s)
Australia	Fox Sports
United Kingdom	Sky Sports
Pakistan	PTV Sports
India	STAR Cricket
South Africa	SuperSport
