= Edward Harrison Compton =

German artist

Edward Harrison Compton (11 October 1881 – 6 March 1960) was a German landscape painter and illustrator of English descent.

== Biography ==
Compton was born in Feldafing in Upper Bavaria, Germany, the second son of notable landscape painter Edward Theodore Compton. He received his early art training from his father, and after a period of study in London at the Central School of Arts and Crafts settled back in Bavaria.

Like his father he was inspired by the Alps to become a mountain painter ("Bergmaler") working in both oils and watercolour. However, an attack of Polio at the age of 28 meant that he had to find more accessible landscapes to paint in Germany, England, northern Italy and Sicily. He also provided illustrations for several travel books published by A & C Black.

Compton exhibited at galleries in Munich and Berlin, and also in England at the Royal Academy in London and in Bradford. He died in Feldafing in 1960.

He had two sisters, both of whom were artists: Marion Compton, the flowers and still-life painter, and Dora Keel-Compton, flower and mountain painter.

== Paintings (selected) ==
- The Matterhorn
- A mountainous landscape
- Matterhorn
- Summer Mountain (1905)
- Sheep in a winter landscape (1905)
- South Bavarian countryside with farmhouse near E.H. Compton´s home (1906)
- Virgin of the Wengernalp
- The Matterhorn
- Alpental (1914)
- Church in Mongrivello, Savoyan Alps, Aosta valley entrance (about 1910)
- Berghof (1919)
- Monastery of Säben Klausen in South Tyrol (1919)
- Farm in St. Leonhard (1921)
- Holy Blood (1941)

== Illustrated books ==
- Baillie-Grohman, W. A. Tyrol (A & C Black, 1908).
- Baillie-Grohman, W. A & Compton, E. T. Germany (A & C Black, 1912).
- Farrer, Reginald. The Dolomites; King Laurin's Garden (A & C Black, 1913).
- Compton, E.H. Chester watercolours (A & C Black, 1916).
- Newth, J. D. Austria (A & C Black, 1931).

Compton also provided the watercolour frontispiece for Andrews, W. & Lang, E. Old English towns (T W laurie, 1909).

== See also ==
- List of German painters
