= Edward Compton (cricketer) =

English cricketer

Personal information
- Full name: Edward Denison Compton
- Born: 11 April 1872; Frome, Somerset, England
- Died: 11 October 1940 (aged 68); Rye, East Sussex, England
- Batting: Right-handed
- Role: Wicketkeeper

Domestic team information
- Years: Team
- 1894–1907: Somerset
- 1896: Oxford University
- First-class debut: 14 June 1894 Somerset v Gloucestershire
- Last First-class: 26 July 1907 Somerset v Sussex

Career statistics
| Competition | First-class |
|---|---|
| Matches | 6 |
| Runs scored | 51 |
| Batting average | 7.28 |
| 100s/50s | –/– |
| Top score | 22* |
| Balls bowled | – |
| Wickets | – |
| Bowling average | – |
| 5 wickets in innings | – |
| 10 wickets in match | – |
| Best bowling | – |
| Catches/stumpings | 4/1 |
- Source: CricketArchive, 26 March 2011

Edward Denison Compton (11 April 1872 – 11 October 1940) played first-class cricket for Somerset and Oxford University between 1894 and 1907. He was born at Frome, Somerset and died at Rye, East Sussex.

Compton was the 11th child (of 17) of the Rev Thomas Hoyle Compton and his wife, the former Eliza Sarah Winzar, and was educated at Lancing College and Keble College, Oxford. As a cricketer, Compton was a lower-order batsman and a wicketkeeper. He played for Somerset in one match in 1894 and two more in 1895, making little impression. At Oxford University, he won a blue for soccer in 1895-96, but had only two first-class cricket matches for the university team, in one of which he scored an unbeaten 22, his highest first-class score. From 1897 to 1902 he played Minor Counties cricket for Oxfordshire, and from 1903 to 1908 he played minor matches for MCC. He returned, 11 years after his previous first-class game, for a single final match for Somerset in 1907, against Sussex at Hastings.

Compton married Annie Maude May in 1900. She died in 1952.
