= Edward Theodore Compton =

Mountain in Germany

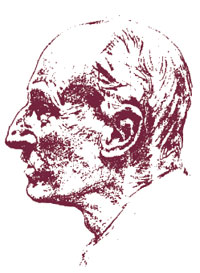
Edward Theodore Compton

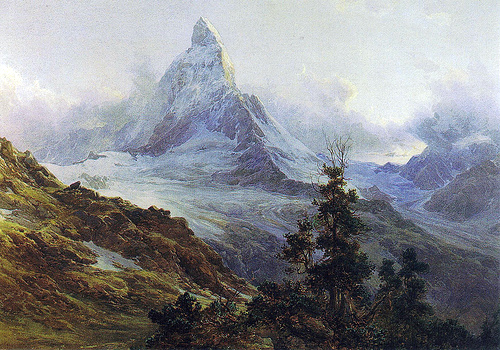
Matterhorn (1879)

Edward Theodore Compton, usually referred to as E. T. Compton, (29 July 1849 – 22 March 1921) was an English-born, German artist, illustrator and mountain climber. He is well known for his paintings and drawings of alpine scenery, and as a mountaineer made 300 major ascents including no fewer than 27 first ascents.

== Life ==
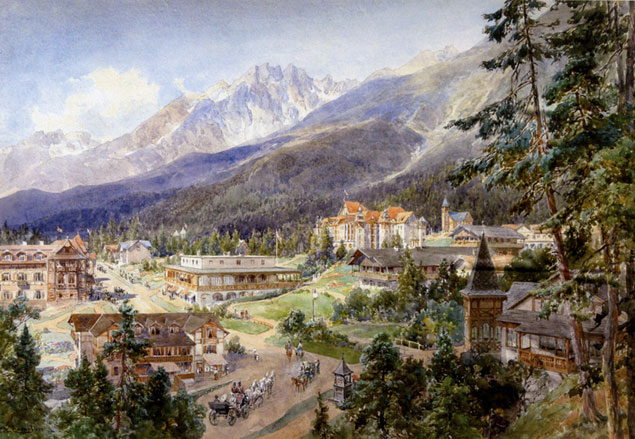
Starý Smokovec in Tatra Mts (1890)

Compton was born in Stoke Newington in London, the son of Theodore Compton, an art-loving insurance agent, and grew up in a deeply religious Quaker household. He attended Sidcot School from 1861 to 1864 and various art schools, including, for a time, the Royal Academy in London, but otherwise he was mainly self-taught in art.

In 1867, wanting the best education for their artistically talented son, and due to the high cost of schooling in England, the family decided to emigrate to Germany settling in Darmstadt. The city at that time was the seat of the Grand Duchy of Hesse under Grand Duke Ludwig III, and a community of artists had sprung up there. Entries in Compton's diary show that both he and his father were art teachers - Alice, the Princess of Hesse numbered amongst Edward's students.

Between 1867 and 1868 Compton toured the Rhineland, Mosel and Eifel areas of Germany, making numerous sketches. In July 1868, the entire Compton family traveled to the Bernese Oberland, the alpine scenery encountered during this trip, particularly the view of the Eiger, Mönch and Jungfrau peaks, inspiring Edward to become a mountain painter.

In 1869, Compton was living in Munich and two years later for the first time exhibited his work at the Glass Palace.

In 1872 he married Auguste Plotz and for two years they travelled through the Tyrol, Carinthia, Italy and Switzerland. From 1874, the couple settled in Feldafing on Lake Starnberg, building a comfortable house there called Villa Compton.

In the following years, Compton travelled to the mountains of Austria, Scandinavia, North Africa, Corsica and Spain recording his impressions in a variety of oil and watercolors paintings and ink drawings. Although alpine scenes predominated, Compton also visited and drew other areas such as the High Tatras in eastern Europe, the Scottish Highlands, the Hebrides, the Lofoten Islands and Northern Cape in Norway, and the Colombian Andes.

In 1880 Compton became a member of the Royal Academy, London. Besides his work as a painter he also became well known as a book illustrator for the German and Austrian Alpine Association (DAV) with titles such as "In the high mountains" by Emil Zsigmondy (1889), "About Fels and Firn" by H. Hess (1901) and "Mountaineering in Pictures" by Alfred Steinitzer (1913). In England he was also in demand as an illustrator providing pictures for a range of titles (see below).

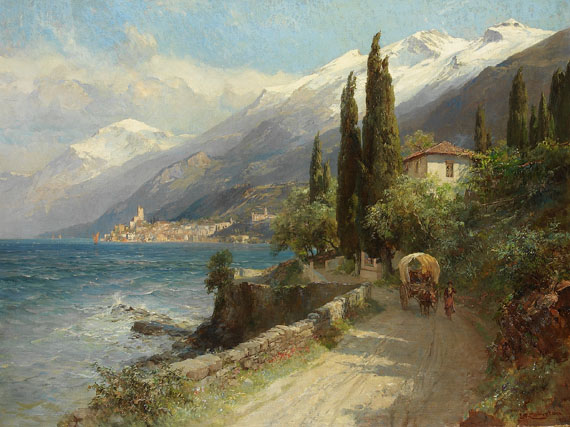
Malcesine on Lake Garda Monte Baldo (1913)

In 1909 Compton accompanied his friend, the mountaineer Karl Blodig on many tours in the Silvretta mountains. At the time of the First World War he was invited by the Austrian army to paint from the mountain front but was forbidden to do so by the Bavarian High Command. He was also excluded from the Munich Artists' Association, because he was English.

Apart from his art, Compton was also an excellent climber, highly regarded by Blodig for his "brilliant mountaineering skill on ice and rock, his truly admirable perseverance, his inexhaustible patience in bearing hardships". He was a member of the exclusive Alpine Club and the German and Austrian Alpine Association (DAV).

Amongst his notable ascents were: Torre di Brenta first climbed in 1882; Cima Brenta, first climbed by the south wall in 1882; Odle, Grande Fermeda in 1887; Aiguille Blanche de Peuterey (ascent in 1905 with Karl Blodig); Grossglockner, climbed at the age of 70!

Compton died in Feldafing on 22 July 1921, aged 72. His son Edward Harrison Compton and daughter Dora Compton were also mountain painters. His other daughter Marion was a flower and still life painter.

== Art and influence ==
Initially painting in the English romantic tradition, Compton later developed a more realistic representation of nature, being guided by his true artistic ideas while retaining topographical accuracy. Even his early watercolors show the great importance of brightness and light and his work is also remarkable for its portrayal of the elements such as water and air, including ascending mist and fog. He can be regarded as an impressionist.

Although Compton never had much formal art education and did not found a school, he influenced artists such as Ernst Platz and Karl Arnold as well as his son Edward Harrison Compton and daughter Dora Compton.

== See also ==
- List of German painters

== Books illustrated by Compton ==
- Knight, Francis A. By leafy ways - Brief studies from the book of nature (Roberts Bros., 1890).
- Knight, Francis A. Idylls of the field (Roberts Bros., 1890).
- Various. The Picturesque Mediterranean, Vol 1, Vol 2 (Cassell, 1890).
- Compton, Theodore & Morgan, C. L. A Mendip valley, its inhabitants and surroundings (Edward Stanford, 1892).
- Compton, William Cookworthy. Caesar's seventh campaign in Gaul, B.C. 52 (George Bell and sons, 1907).
- Baillie-Grohman, W. A & Compton, E. H. Germany (A & C Black, 1912).
- Wallraf-Richartz-Museum: Das Skizzenbuch einer Eifelwanderung im Jahre 1868. (Exhibition catalog). Köln 1985
