= Denis Compton =

English cricketer (1918–1997)

Denis Compton CBE
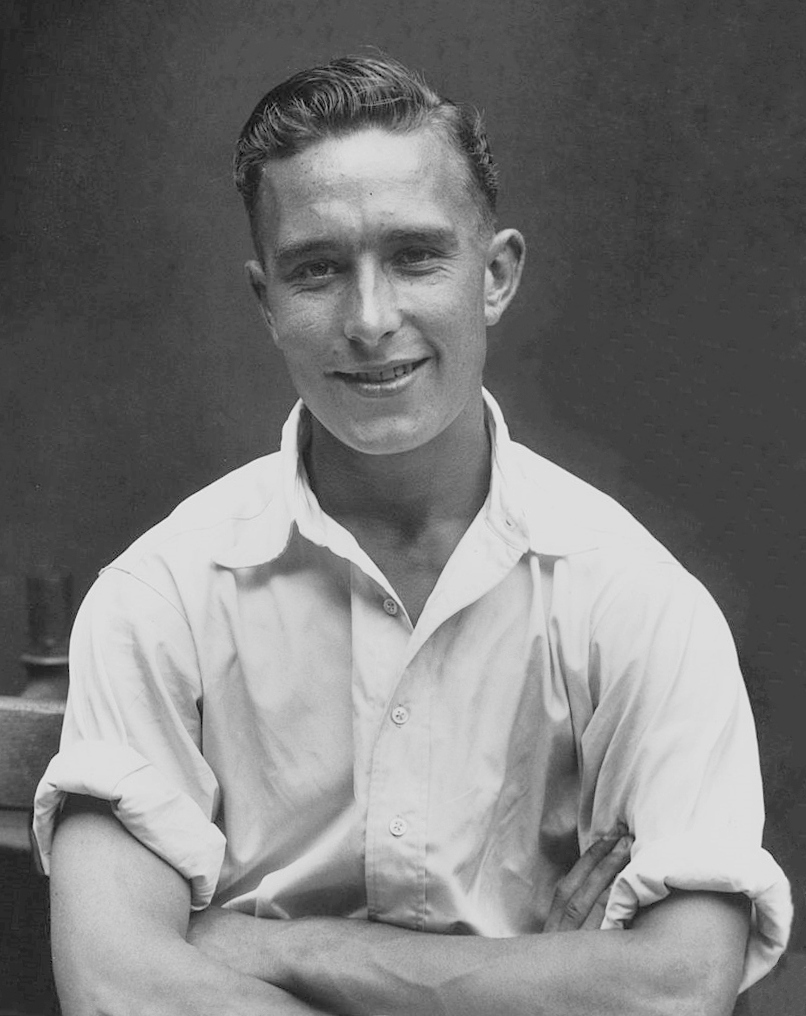
- Compton in about 1936

Personal information
- Full name: Denis Charles Scott Compton
- Born: 23 May 1918; Hendon, Middlesex, England
- Died: 23 April 1997 (aged 78); Windsor, Berkshire, England
- Height: 5 ft 10 in (1.78 m)
- Batting: Right-handed
- Bowling: Left-arm unorthodox spin
- Relatives: Leslie Compton (brother); Brian Compton (son); Richard Compton (son); Patrick Compton (son); Ben Compton (grandson); Nick Compton (grandson) Charlotte Compton (daughter) Victoria Compton (daughter)

International information
- National side: England
- Test debut (cap 297): 14 August 1937 v New Zealand
- Last Test: 5 March 1957 v South Africa

Domestic team information
- Years: Team
- 1936–1964: Marylebone Cricket Club
- 1936–1958: Middlesex
- 1944/45–1945/46: Europeans
- 1944/45: Holkar

Career statistics
| Competition | Test | First-class |
|---|---|---|
| Matches | 78 | 515 |
| Runs scored | 5,807 | 38,942 |
| Batting average | 50.06 | 51.85 |
| 100s/50s | 17/28 | 123/183 |
| Top score | 278 | 300 |
| Balls bowled | 2,710 | 36,640 |
| Wickets | 25 | 622 |
| Bowling average | 56.40 | 32.27 |
| 5 wickets in innings | 1 | 19 |
| 10 wickets in match | 0 | 3 |
| Best bowling | 5/70 | 7/36 |
| Catches/stumpings | 49/– | 416/– |
- Source: ESPNcricinfo, 15 August 2022

Denis Charles Scott Compton CBE (23 May 1918 – 23 April 1997) was an English multi-sportsman. As a cricketer he played in 78 Test matches and spent his whole career with Middlesex. As a footballer, he played as a winger and spent most of his career at Arsenal, where he would win both the top flight and F.A. Cup.

A right-handed batsman and left-arm unorthodox spin bowler, Compton is regularly credited as one of England's most remarkable batsmen. Indeed, Sir Don Bradman said he was one of the greatest cricket players he'd ever seen. He is one of only twenty-five players to have scored over one hundred centuries in first-class cricket. In 2009, Compton was posthumously inducted into the ICC Cricket Hall of Fame. The Denis Compton Oval and a stand at Lord's Cricket Ground are both named in his honour.

== Cricket career ==
=== Early years ===
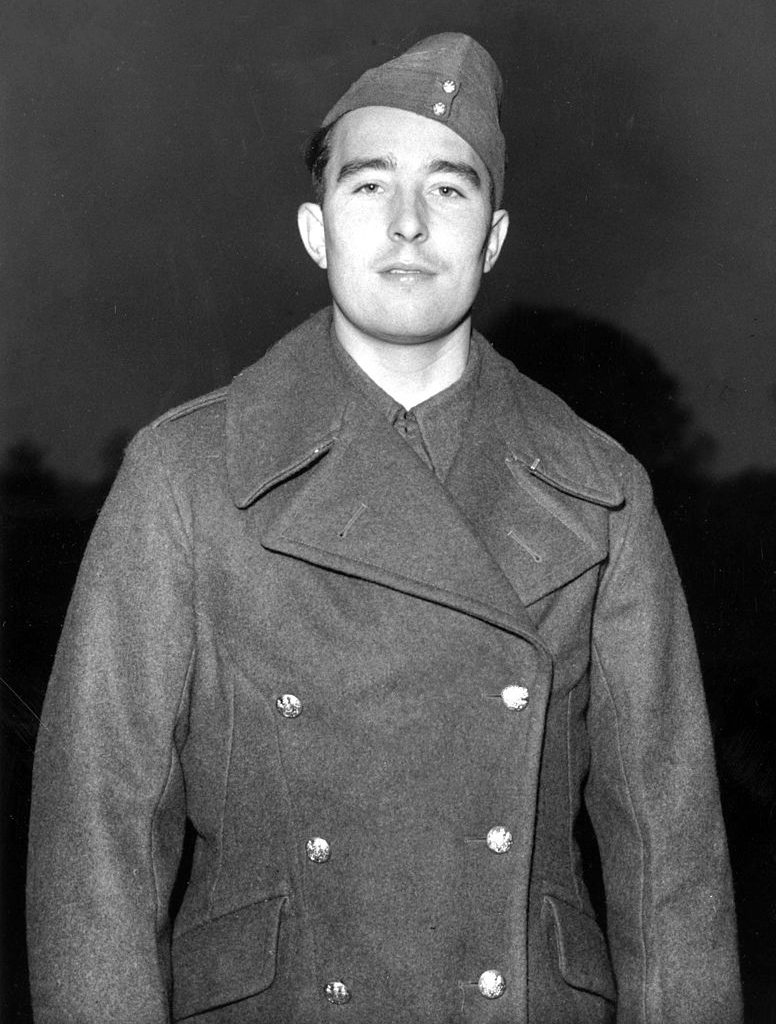
Compton in 1939 as a gunner in the army

Compton was born and brought up in what was then the urban district of Hendon, which later became part of Greater London; his father had moved there in hopes of finding more work. He was the second son and youngest child of Henry Ernest Compton, a self-employed painter and decorator, later a lorry driver when his business failed, and Jessie Anne (née Duthie); he had one elder brother, Leslie Harry (1912–1984) and one elder sister, Hilda Dorothy (1913–2002). He was educated at Bell Lane Primary School and joined the MCC ground staff at Lord's Cricket Ground at the age of 15. The previous summer he had begun to make a name for himself when, at that same venue, he scored 114 as captain of an Elementary Schools XI, impressing Test selector Sir Pelham Warner.

By the late 1930s, Compton was one of England's most successful batsmen, and remained at the top of his profession for twenty years. As an all-rounder Compton was a right-hand bat and a slow left-arm wrist-spin bowler.

Compton earned his first England cap against New Zealand in 1937. At 19 years and 83 days, he remains the third youngest England debutant ever. He scored his first Test century aged just 20 years and 19 days in 1938 against Don Bradman's touring Australians. This broke the record, set by J. W. Hearne in 1911, for the youngest Test century by an England batsman, and remains the record to this day. Later in the same series he scored a match-saving 76 not out at Lord's; this innings was scored on a rain-affected pitch and greatly impressed Don Bradman. In 1939, he scored 2468 runs for the season, including 120 against the West Indies at Lord's.

As with many other sportsmen of his generation, he lost some of his best years to the Second World War, during which he served in the army in India. He was posted at Mhow, Central India. He was granted permission to play for the Holkar team in the Ranji Trophy, India's national cricket tournament. It was in India that he began his close friendship with his Australian counterpart, Test cricketer, footballer and national hero, Keith Miller. They played against each other in the match at Calcutta between the Australian Services team and East Zone.

The match was interrupted by rioting when Compton was on 94, and one of the rioters who had invaded the pitch ran up to Compton and said: "Mr Compton, you very good player, but the match must stop now." This was a phrase which Miller gleefully recalled whenever Compton went out to bat against the Australians. In recognition of their amiable friendship and rivalry, the ECB and Cricket Australia decided in 2005 that the player adjudged the Player of the Series in the Ashes would be awarded the Compton–Miller medal.

=== 1947 ===
England toured Australia in the 1946–47 Ashes series and though they were beaten by the powerful Australian team, Compton distinguished himself by scoring a century in each innings of the Adelaide Test.

Back in England, Compton produced a season of cricket that established him as a British household name, and one of the greatest cricketers of his era. Helped by a rare summer of sunshine, Compton thrilled the war-weary English public with his cavalier batting. Against the touring South Africans, Compton scored five centuries, one for Middlesex and four for England, accumulating 1,056 runs at an average of 88. His aggregate in all matches that season was 3,816 runs, which remains the most ever made in a season in first-class matches. In that season, he scored 18 centuries, with the last one scored on 15 September 1947. Eighteen hundreds in a single season is another world record to his name.

According to journalist Frank Keating, Compton's personal favourite innings of that summer was for Middlesex against Kent at Lord's. Chasing 397 to win, and needing to score at nearly 100 runs per hour, Compton led the way with a dashing 168, but Middlesex fell short by 75 runs.

Cricket writers Neville Cardus and John Arlott acclaimed Compton's achievements. Cardus wrote:

Never have I been so deeply touched on a cricket ground as in this heavenly summer, when I went to Lord's to see a pale-faced crowd, existing on rations, the rocket-bomb still in the ears of most, and see the strain of anxiety and affliction passed from all hearts and shoulders at the sight of Compton in full sail ... each stroke a flick of delight, a propulsion of happy, sane, healthy life. There were no rations in an innings by Compton.

Arlott, who had written his first cricket book that summer, concluded with a tribute to Compton:

To close the eyes is to see again that easy, happy figure at the wicket, pushing an unruly forelock out of the eye and then as it falls down again, playing off the wrong foot a stroke which passes deep-point like a bullet ... never again will the boyish delight in hitting a ball with a piece of wood flower directly into charm and gaiety and all the wealth of achievement.

=== Later career ===
Against Bradman's Invincibles in 1948, Compton was England's standout performer in a losing cause. In the First Test at Trent Bridge he scored 184 in the second innings after Australia had established a first innings lead of 344, and it looked as though he might save the match for England until he lost his balance to a short-pitched ball from Miller and hit his wicket. In the Third Test at Old Trafford, Compton scored an unbeaten 145 in the first innings, when no other batsman made more than 37. He had scored only four runs when, while facing a bumper barrage from Ray Lindwall, he edged the ball onto his forehead. Compton was forced off the ground with a cut head, given two stitches, and ordered to rest despite wanting to return to the crease.

He eventually came back out when England was teetering at 119 for 5 and enabled the team to reach 363. This was the only match that England did not lose, and if so much time had not been lost to the weather they might have won it. In the series he made 562 runs at 62.44, against fierce fast bowling from Lindwall, Miller and Bill Johnston.

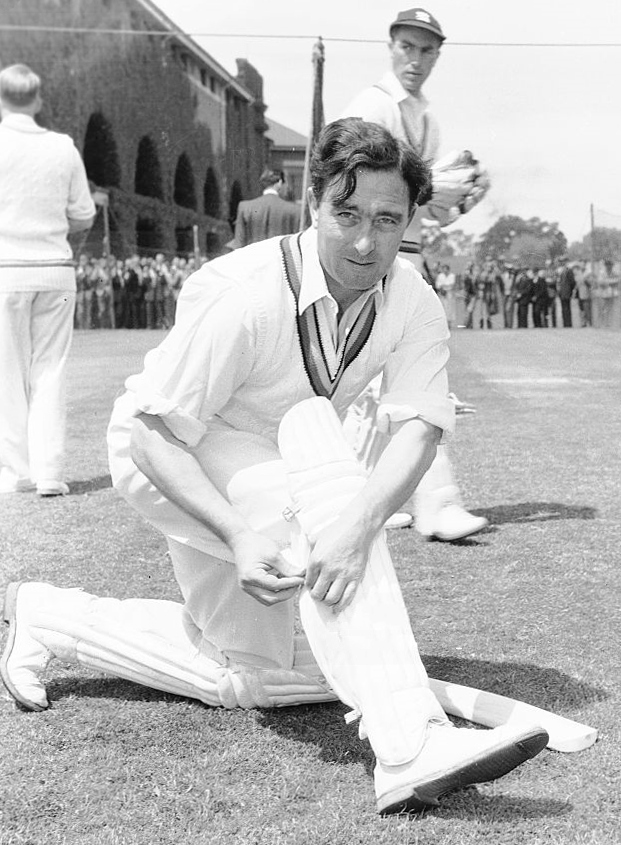
Compton at the Ashes Test Series on 29 October 1954

On the MCC tour of South Africa 1948–49 he scored 300 against North-Eastern Transvaal in just a minute over three hours – still the fastest triple-century ever in first-class cricket. His first hundred took 66 minutes (he said, "I was getting a sight of the bowling"), his second 78 minutes (he was not out overnight and had to play himself in again next morning), and his third hundred took just 37 minutes. Reminiscing about the match later, Compton compared the South Africans' bowling with a decent county side, but criticised their catching (he had been dropped before he reached 20).

He toured Australia for 1950–51 Ashes series as vice-captain, the first professional in the 20th century to be awarded the position, but had a dismal tour because of a recurring knee problem caused by an old football injury. He averaged only 7.57 in the Tests, but 92.11 in his other first-class matches. He became the first professional to captain the Marylebone Cricket Club (MCC) for an entire game, Jack Hobbs having taken over from the injured Arthur Carr in 1924–1925. He and Len Hutton made the winning runs in the Fifth Test at Melbourne, the first time Australia had been beaten since 1938.

Compton also jointly captained Middlesex between 1951 and 1952, with Bill Edrich. Also in 1952, Compton scored his 100th first-class century against Northampton while featuring for Middlesex at Lord's.

On the 1954–55 tour his departure was delayed for a remedial operation on his knee and he joined the team in Australia by aeroplane. In the First Test at Brisbane he badly cut his hand when he hit a billboard while fielding and batted at the bottom of the order. He missed the Second Test. He came third in the England Test averages (38.20), but topped the tour averages (57.07) and made three centuries. In his last Test against Australia in 1956 he top-scored with 94 despite having had his right kneecap removed the previous November.

In home test series against Pakistan he set the record for scoring the most runs in between lunch and tea in a Test match (173).

Compton finished his cricket career after playing 78 Test matches with 17 centuries at an average of 50.06. In all first-class cricket he scored 123 centuries.

== Football career ==
Denis Compton
Personal information
- Position: Winger

Youth career
- 1933–1935: Nunhead

Senior career*
| Years | Team | Apps | (Gls) |
| 1936–1950 | Arsenal | 54 | (15) |
- * Club domestic league appearances and goals

Compton also played football, beginning his career at non-league Nunhead in the 1933–34 season before joining Arsenal. While playing as a winger, he made his debut in 1936, taking up the number 11 jersey at the club. Arsenal won the league championship (old First Division) in 1937–38, but Denis Compton did not get a medal since he had made only 7 appearances that season. Compton was eventually successful with Arsenal at Highbury, winning the League title in 1948 and the FA Cup in 1950.

However, the latter part of his sporting career was dogged by injury after his right knee was damaged in a collision with the goalkeeper of Charlton Athletic. He was thus limited to 60 official, i.e. non-wartime appearances, scoring 16 goals altogether. He represented England in wartime games on twelve occasions, but never in a full official match. He also appeared in the Rovers Cup in India with a visiting British team.

== Personality and legacy ==
Compton's absent-mindedness was legendary. Colin Cowdrey writes that Compton turned up for the Old Trafford Test of 1955 against South Africa without his kitbag. Undaunted, he sauntered into the museum and, borrowing an antique bat off the display, went on to score 158 and 71. Nevertheless, England lost by three wickets. This absent-mindedness was particularly obvious in his tendency to run out his partners at the crease: Trevor Bailey declared that "a call for a run from Compton should be treated as no more than a basis for negotiation". In typical form, at his brother Leslie's benefit match in 1955, he managed to run Leslie out before he had faced a single ball.

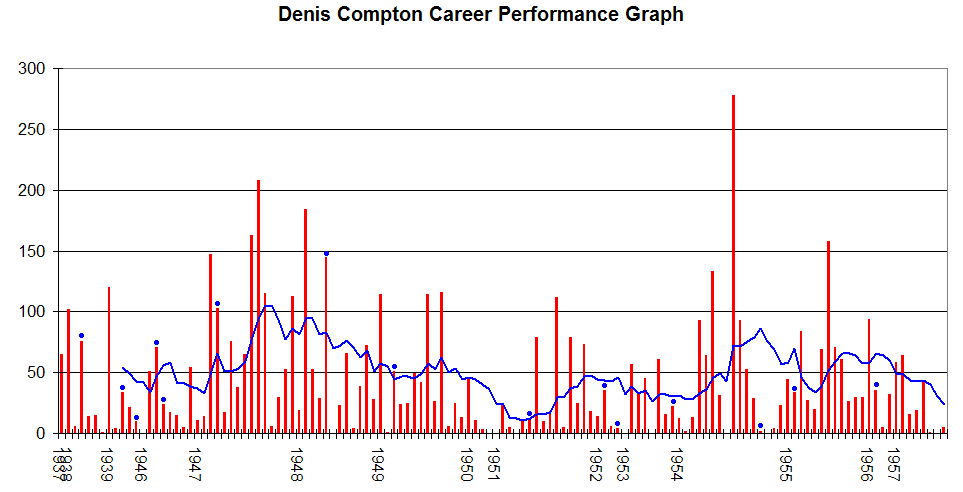
Compton's career performance graph

Peter Parfitt, the Middlesex and England batsman, was a speaker at a major celebration in London for Compton's 70th birthday. He claims that the chief guest was called to the telephone by a lady who had heard about the dinner. Eventually, he agreed to take the call. "Denis," she said, "it's me, your mother. You're not 70, you're only 69."

After retiring from sport, Denis Compton became a journalist and later a commentator for BBC Television. He was made a CBE in 1958. He became the first former professional cricketer to be elected President of Middlesex County Cricket Club in 1991. He served two terms, until a week before his death from septicaemia in Windsor, Berkshire aged 78.

Compton's death, on Saint George's Day, coincided with the opening of the 1997 County Championship season, and pavilion flags across the country were lowered to half-mast in his memory. The MCC named the twin stands at the Nursery End of Lord's Cricket Ground in his and Bill Edrich's honour. Cricket writer Colin Bateman noted, however, that it was "a dull, practical structure which does little justice to their mercurial talents and indomitable spirits".

Compton was also honoured at the Shenley Cricket Centre, where the main pitch is named the Denis Compton Oval. That is where his grandson, Nick Compton, set the Middlesex record for the 6th wicket partnership in List A cricket (142* BL Hutton & NRD Compton v Lancashire at Shenley 2002).

== Commercial sponsorships ==
With his contemporary the footballer Stanley Matthews, Compton was the first British sportsman to make a substantial living by exploiting his sporting reputation to provide advertisements and endorsements. For many years he was the public face of the Brylcreem range of men's haircare products.

An example of this is illustrated upon page VIII of the Wisden Cricketers' Almanack edition of 1955. Denis Compton developed a close working relationship with Royds Advertising, and its chairman, who at that time was Nicholas Royds.

== Personal life ==
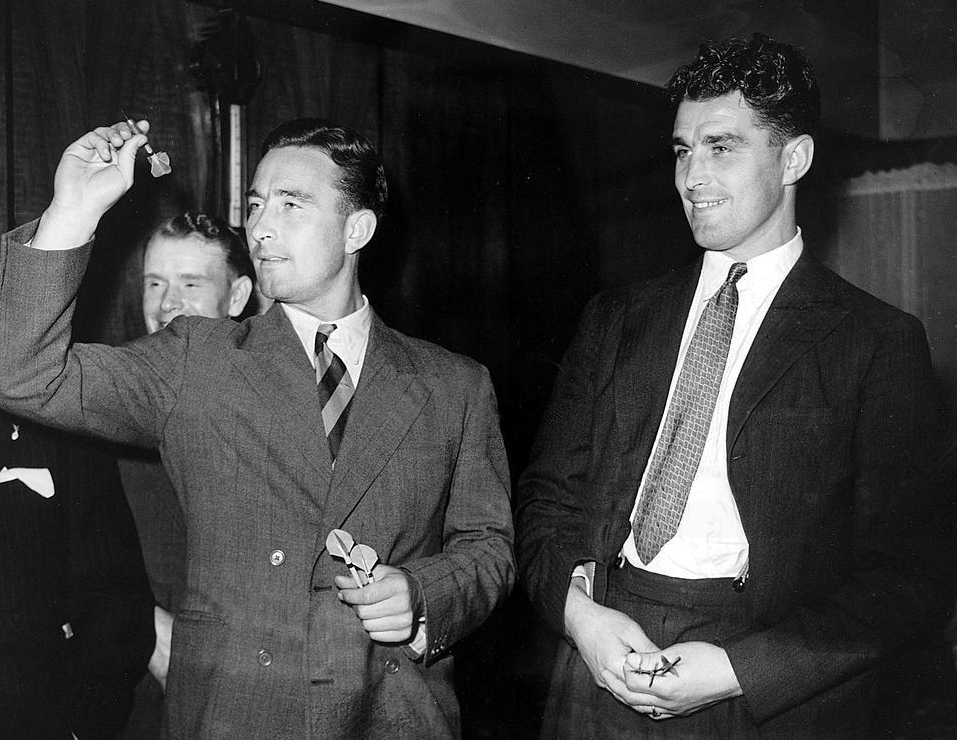
Denis and Leslie in 1947

Compton's elder brother Leslie also played cricket for Middlesex and football as a defender for Arsenal and England.

Compton was married three times. His first wife was Doris Rich, a dancer. They married at St John's Wood on 1 March 1941 and had a son, Brian (born 2 January 1942).

With his second wife, Valerie Platt, Compton had two sons, Patrick and Richard, both of whom were born in England but brought up by their mother in South Africa after 1960. Both of them went on to play cricket for Natal.

In 1975, Compton married his third wife, Christine Franklin Tobias, with whom he had two daughters, Charlotte and Victoria. His grandson Nick, son of Richard, made his Test debut against India at Ahmedabad during the England cricket team's 2012–13 tour of India.

== Test centuries ==
The following table summarises the Test centuries scored by Denis Compton.

- In the column Runs, * indicates being not out.
- The column title Match refers to the Match Number of his career.

Denis Compton's Test Centuries
| # | Runs | Match | Against | City/Country | Venue | Year | Result |
|---|---|---|---|---|---|---|---|
| [1] | 102 | 2 | Australia | Nottingham, England | Trent Bridge | 1938 | Drawn |
| [2] | 120 | 6 | West Indies | London, England | Lord's | 1939 | Won |
| [3] | 147 | 15 | Australia | Adelaide, Australia | Adelaide Oval | 1947 | Drawn |
| [4] | 103* | 15 | Australia | Adelaide, Australia | Adelaide Oval | 1947 | Drawn |
| [5] | 163 | 18 | South Africa | Nottingham, England | Trent Bridge | 1947 | Drawn |
| [6] | 208 | 19 | South Africa | London, England | Lord's | 1947 | Won |
| [7] | 115 | 20 | South Africa | Manchester, England | Old Trafford | 1947 | Won |
| [8] | 113 | 22 | South Africa | London, England | Kennington Oval | 1947 | Drawn |
| [9] | 184 | 23 | Australia | Nottingham, England | Trent Bridge | 1948 | Lost |
| [10] | 145* | 25 | Australia | Manchester, England | Old Trafford | 1948 | Drawn |
| [11] | 114 | 29 | South Africa | Johannesburg, South Africa | Ellis Park | 1948 | Drawn |
| [12] | 114 | 33 | New Zealand | Leeds, England | Headingley | 1949 | Drawn |
| [13] | 116 | 34 | New Zealand | London, England | Lord's | 1949 | Drawn |
| [14] | 112 | 44 | South Africa | Nottingham, England | Trent Bridge | 1951 | Lost |
| [15] | 133 | 58 | West Indies | Port of Spain, Trinidad | Queen's Park Oval | 1954 | Drawn |
| [16] | 278 | 61 | Pakistan | Nottingham, England | Trent Bridge | 1954 | Won |
| [17] | 158 | 70 | South Africa | Manchester, England | Old Trafford | 1955 | Lost |

== Honours ==
Arsenal

- Football League First Division: 1947–48
- FA Cup: 1949–50

== In popular culture ==
The sitcom Man About the House referenced Compton in the episode "I Won't Dance, Don't Ask Me..." (first broadcast in October 1974), when Chrissy suggests to Robin that he could have a haircut before the dance they are going to: "Well you only have to have a little trim. You can grease the rest down with hair cream." Robin responds, "Chrissy, I'm going as me, not Denis Compton".

Compton is mentioned in the Fawlty Towers episode "The Builders". When questioning the maid, Polly, about who is at fault for some bungled hotel renovations, Basil sarcastically asks her, "... whose fault is it then you cloth-eared bint? Denis Compton's?"

In an episode of Ever Decreasing Circles titled "The Cricket Match", Martin explains to his neighbour Paul that Compton never undermined his county captain George Mann despite being the better player.

In Tim Rice's Academy Awards acceptance speech for the song "Can You Feel the Love Tonight", he thanked Compton as "... a childhood hero of mine."

In the As Time Goes By episode "Living Together, But Where?", Lionel wonders whether he should keep his copy of a book written by Compton.

Denis Compton appears as a mystery guest in the BBC version of What's My Line?, hosted by Eamonn Andrews and aired on 5 October 1957.

Compton and Colin Cowdrey met Buddy Holly and The Crickets at the former Whisky a GoGo, at 33–37, Wardour Street, Soho, London, in April 1958, during the rock 'n' roll group's British tour, and explained the game of cricket to them.

Compton was celebrated in song by the Trinidadian calypsonian Lord Kitchener in his 1951 song "The Denis Compton Calypso".

Sporting positions
| Preceded by Walter Robins | Middlesex County Cricket Captain; 1951–1952 (jointly with Bill Edrich) | Succeeded by Bill Edrich |
