= Leslie Compton =

English footballer (1912–1984)

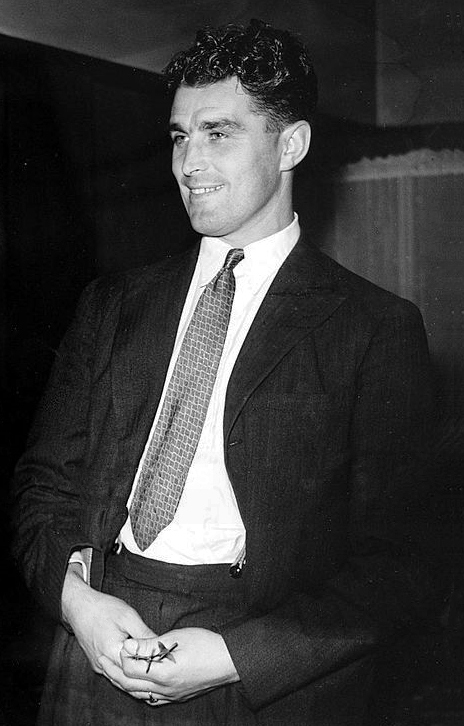
- Compton in 1947

Personal information
- Full name: Leslie Harry Compton
- Date of birth: 12 September 1912
- Place of birth: Woodford, Essex, England
- Date of death: 27 December 1984 (aged 72)
- Place of death: Hendon, London, England
- Positions: Centre half; right back

Senior career*
Years	Team	Apps	(Gls)
1930–1952	Arsenal	253	(5)

International career
1950	England	2	(0)
- * Club domestic league appearances and goals

Leslie Harry Compton (12 September 1912 – 27 December 1984) was an English sportsman who played football and cricket for Arsenal and Middlesex, respectively. He gained two England caps late in his football career, and remains the oldest outfield player to debut for England (and the oldest post-war debutant in any position). His brother, Denis, was also a footballer and cricketer for Arsenal and Middlesex, though Leslie was more successful in football and Denis in cricket.

== Football career ==
Compton was born Woodford, Essex and played football for Middlesex Schools before joining Arsenal as an amateur in 1930. He would spend his entire senior club career at Arsenal, over a period of 22 years, making him one of the club's longest-ever serving players. He made his debut on 24 April 1932 against Aston Villa in a 1–1 draw at Villa Park, two months after he had turned professional.

He started out as a right-back, and deputised for Tom Parker in the early 1930s, before George Male was converted to that position and became Parker's long-term replacement. Relegated to reserve team football, Compton only played 13 first-team games in four seasons. By 1935–36 he had started to feature more regularly, playing 12 games that season and 15 the next, but missed out on a First Division winners' medal in 1937–38 as he only managed 9 appearances that season.

Despite being down the pecking order throughout the 1930s and missing out on the success that Arsenal enjoyed, Compton stuck with Arsenal and won a Charity Shield winners' medal in 1938–39, playing 19 times that season. However the Second World War then intervened; Compton served in the Army while continuing to play football for Arsenal. Converted to an emergency centre-forward, he once scored ten times in a wartime match against Leyton Orient, which finished 15–2 to Arsenal. He also guested for Chester, scoring a hat-trick against Everton during the 1942–43 season. In June 1940, he was one of five Arsenal players who guested for Southampton in a victory over Fulham at Craven Cottage.

After the war had ended, he reverted to defence, becoming a mainstay in the Arsenal side at centre half. Although he missed the first six games of the 1947–48 due to cricketing commitments but was a near ever-present for the remainder of the season, as Arsenal won the First Division title and Compton finally earned a top-class honour; his brother, Denis, had also by this time established himself in the Arsenal side and won a medal as well. During the close season, he succeeded Joe Mercer as Arsenal captain, but relinquished the armband soon after, saying Mercer deserved the honour more.

Compton went on to win the FA Cup in 1949–50, scoring a last-minute equaliser in the Gunners' semi-final against Chelsea, heading a corner kick from his brother Denis to level the match 2–2; Arsenal won the replay 1–0, and then beat Liverpool in the final. Compton's form was such that he was selected for England for their match against Wales on 15 November 1950, making him, at 38 years and 64 days, the oldest post-war England debutant and the oldest ever outfield player to debut. These records still stand. Alexander Morten holds the all-time record.

He was a regular in the Arsenal side until the start of the 1951–52 season, during which he only played four matches. He decided to retire from playing football in the 1952 close season; in total he played 273 matches and scored 6 goals. He stayed on at Arsenal for another three years as a coach and scout.

== Cricket career ==
Leslie Compton
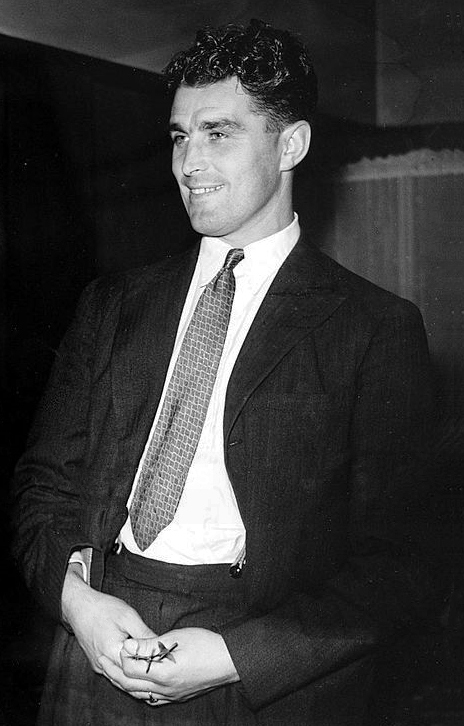

Cricket information
- Batting: Right-handed
- Bowling: Right-arm medium

Domestic team information
- Years: Team
- 1938–1956: Middlesex

Career statistics
Competition	First-class
Matches	274
Runs scored	5,814
Batting average	16.75
100s/50s	1/24
Top score	107
Balls bowled	1,069
Wickets	12
Bowling average	47.41
5 wickets in innings	0
10 wickets in match	0
Best bowling	2/21
Catches/stumpings	470/129
- Source: Cricinfo, 23 May 2019

Compton also played cricket for Middlesex, often playing as wicket-keeper from 1938 to 1956. He appeared 272 times, scoring 5,814 runs (an average of 16.75), and taking 468 catches and 131 stumpings for the county. Together with his brother, he won the 1947 County Championship title with Middlesex, making them the only brothers ever to have won the national title both in football and cricket. Unlike Denis though, Leslie never played Test cricket for England.

== Retirement and death ==
After retiring he ran "Hanley Arms" pub in Hornsey Road, north London. He died in Hendon in December 1984, from complications due to diabetes, aged 72; his foot had been amputated two years previously because of this. He was cremated at the Golders Green Crematorium where his ashes remain.

== Honours ==
Arsenal

- Football League First Division: 1947–48
- FA Cup: 1949–50
- FA Charity Shield: 1938, 1948
