= List of gay novels prior to the Stonewall riots =

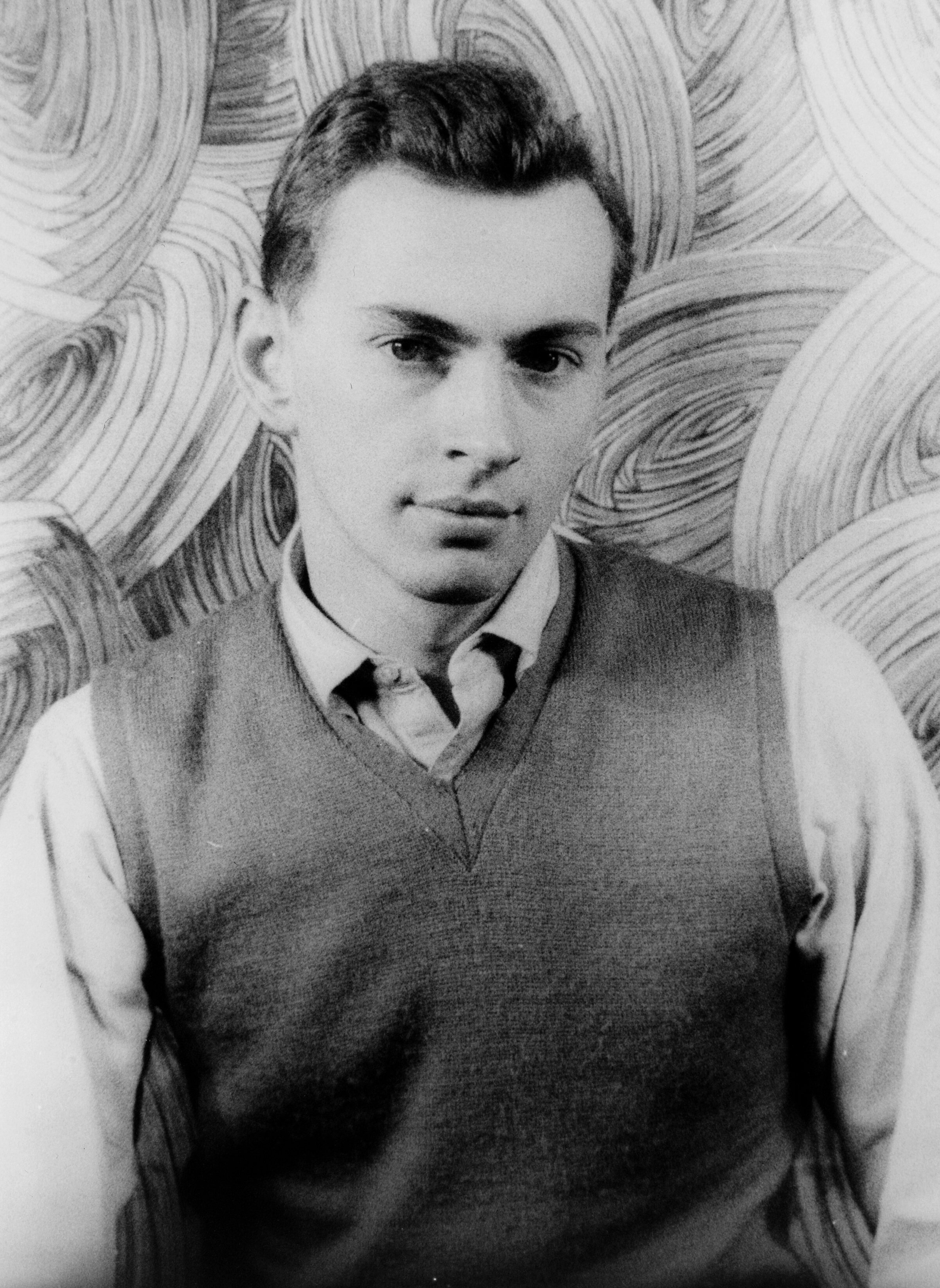
American author Gore Vidal wrote the pioneering 1948 novel The City and the Pillar about a gay man coming of age. Vidal himself rejected the labels 'gay' and 'straight', believing all people were naturally bisexual.

While the modern novel format dates back at least as far as the 18th century, novels dealing with desire or relationships between men were rare during the early part of the 20th century, and nearly non-existent before then, due to the taboo nature of homosexuality at the time. Many early novels depicting (or even alluding to) homosexuality were published anonymously or pseudonymously, or like Maurice, sat unpublished until after the death of the author, reflecting authors' fear of opprobrium, censorship, or legal prosecution.

Works which are widely labeled "gay novels" generally feature overt gay attraction or relationships as central concerns. In some cases, the label may be applied to early novels which merely contain homosexual allusions or subtext, such as Oscar Wilde's The Picture of Dorian Gray. Works that feature only minor gay characters or scenes, such as the 1748 erotic novel Fanny Hill, are not included in this list.

Many authors of early gay novels were themselves gay or bisexual men, such as Oscar Wilde, Gore Vidal, and James Baldwin. Others were heterosexual, or of unknown identity, writing under a pseudonym. One popular and influential writer of early gay novels, Mary Renault, was a lesbian woman.

Through the second half of the 20th century, as homosexuality became more visible and less taboo, gay themes came to appear more frequently in fiction. This list includes only novels written (though not necessarily published) before 1969, the year of the Stonewall riots, which are widely seen as a turning point in the gay rights movement. Gay plays such as Frank Marcus's The Killing of Sister George do not fit the definition of novel.

== Identity of the first gay novel ==
Owing to varying criteria for what it means for a novel to be 'gay' (and, moreover, varying criteria for what makes a work of fiction a novel), there is no single work which is widely agreed to be the first gay novel. In 2014, the magazine The Gay & Lesbian Review Worldwide conducted a reader survey seeking to identify the first gay novel. E.M. Forster's Maurice (written in 1913) received a plurality of 29% of votes. The next most popular selections were The City and the Pillar and The Picture of Dorian Gray, but votes were widely dispersed.

== 19th century ==
Year	Title (Note: Citations in this column are for the purposes of verifying the work's status as a "gay novel".)	Author (Note: Names in quotation marks are pseudonyms.)	Country	Notes
1805	Kyllenion – Ein Jahr in Arkadien	Duke Augustus of Saxe-Gotha-Altenburg	Germany	[A Year in Arcadia: Kyllenion] Set in ancient Greece, it features several couples –including a homosexual one– falling in love, overcoming obstacles and living happily ever after. This is his only published work.
1822	Olivier ou le Secret	Duchess Claire de Duras (Claire de Coëtnempren de Kersaint)	France	[Olivier; or, The Secret] Olivier de Sancerre evokes, under cover of impotence, male homosexuality. In the first decades of the 19th century, homosexuality was manifested in stories through the representation of masculine impotence and epicene characters.
1826	Olivier	"Henri de Latouche" (Hyacinthe-Joseph Alexandre Thabaud de Latouche)	France	Set between the end of the Ancien Régime and the Bourbon Restoration, tells the story of Olivier, count de R.. Latouche's text is the most explicit of the three (Olivier by Duras and Armance by Stendhal), with its mention of Mariage blanc. The character's secret and the consequent obstacle have always been interpreted in the direction of physical impotence, and, secondarily, of homosexuality.
1827	Armance ou quelques scènes d'un salon de Paris en 1827	Anonymous (Marie-Henri Beyle "Stendhal")	France	[Armance; or, Some Scenes from a Paris Salon in 1827] Set during the Bourbon Restoration, Octave de Malivert, a taciturn but brilliant young man barely out of the École Polytechnique, is attracted to Armance Zohiloff, who shares his feelings. The novel describes how a series of misunderstandings have kept the lovers Armance and Octave divided. A series of clues suggest that Octave is impotent as a result of a severe accident. Stendhal has very quietly inserted the theme, without talking about it openly.
1829	Aloys ou le Religieux du mont Saint-Bernard	Marquis Astolphe de Custine	France	[Aloys; or, The Religious of Mont Saint-Bernard] Tells the story of an interrupted courtship. A young fiancé breaks off his engagement a few days before the wedding ceremony, apparently the reason is the groom's secret passion for the girl's mother. After the break, Aloys takes her vows and retires to the convent.
1835	Séraphîta	Honoré de Balzac	France	In a castle in Norway near the fjord Strømfjord, Séraphitüs, a strange and melancholic being, conceals a terrible secret. He loves Minna, and she returns this love, believing Séraphitüs to be a man. But Séraphitüs is also loved by Wilfrid, who considers him to be a woman, Séraphîta. In reality, Séraphitüs-Séraphîta is a perfect androgyne, born to parents who by the doctrines of Swedenborg have transcended their humanity. The novel introduces bisexuality and androgyny.
1836*	Chi mi difenderà dal tuo bel volto?	"Stendhal" (Marie-Henri Beyle)	Italy	[Who will defend me from your beauty?] Narrates the romance between the 57-year-old painter Michelangelo Buonarroti and Tommaso Cavalieri, the young 23-year-old Roman aristocrat who inspired many of the poems of the Renaissance genius. Written between 1832 and 1836. He never wrote it as such, except for sketches of the novel in loose notes, which were published in 1995.
1849	Pin Hua Bao Jian	Chen Sen	China	[Beautiful mirror with arranged flowers] It is a pornographic novel written during the Qing dynasty, focusing on the life of a famous Peking Opera actor, Du Qinyan, and the homosexual love between him and the young scholar Mei Ziyu. Pin Hua Bao Jian did not acquire much research attention until the twenty-first century because of the sensitivity of its content. At present academic researches on the novel are mostly at the macro level concentrating on the author’s biography finished time of the book definition of homosexual relationship gender studies and the art of literature creation and drama research.
1851*	Hançerli Hanım Hikaye-i Garibesi	Anonymous	Turkey	[The Strange Story of the Dagger Lady] Published by Cerîde-i Havâdis Publishing House in 1851–1852, is a folk tale told by maddahs based on oral tradition. It is a mixed type of story in verse and prose told by the lovers of the storytellers. The prose parts are sung with imitations and gestures, and the verse parts are sung while playing the saz. It is not known who wrote the folk tales, however, it is known that this is one of the popular stories about the reign of Murad IV, and an example of the literature of the Tanzimat period. This realistic folk tale begins with the relationship between Kamer and Süleyman, who loved each other during the reign of Murad IV. It then continues with the unorthodox sexuality between Ghulam i Nâyab, with whom Sultan Cemşid fell in love, and Seyfi Dil, with whom Nâyab fell in love.
1858*	I Neoplatonici	Luigi Settembrini	Italy	[The Neoplatonics] Set in ancient Greece, it tells the story of the erotic and sentimental education of two beautiful boys, Callicles and Doro, united by a strong passion since they were children, who discover and experience sexuality in a strangely joyous and natural way –open and without exclusions. It was published until 1977.
1859	Monsieur Auguste	Joseph Méry	France	[Mr. Auguste] The story begins with a ball given at the Lebretons' house. Louise, the only daughter of the wealthy widower Mr. Lebreton, is in love with Auguste Verpilliot. The latter is in love with his friend the painter Octave, and the latter is in love with Louise. Auguste pretends to want to marry Louise in order to thwart the plans of Octave, the man he desires.
1861	Cecil Dreeme	Theodore Winthrop	US	Robert Byng has recently returned from his Grand Tour of Europe to settle in New York City. An old friend lends Byng his rooms at Chrysalis College. It is there that Byng meets his mysterious and reclusive neighbor Cecil Dreeme, and the two strike up what scholars have identified as a romantic friendship.
1870	Joseph and His Friend: A Story of Pennsylvania	Bayard Taylor	US	The title characters have a close, affectionate friendship, but are not physically intimate, and both have romantic relationships with women. Scholars disagree as to whether the story should be understood as having a gay subtext.
1871	La historia de Chucho el Ninfo	"Facundo" (José Tomás de Cuéllar)	Mexico	[The Story of Chucho the Nympho] Introduces the first clearly effeminate character, who does not identify as a man. Chucho is born and raised surrounded by women who love and flatter him, but who do not educate him. Adrift and without paternal guidance, this spoiled child ends up becoming a “ninfo” (Nympho) in his adolescence, a man overly concerned with his image (clothes, hair, cosmetics, shoes) as well as with worldly but unproductive pursuits, such as dancing, partying, and seduction.
1875	Fridolins heimliche Ehe	Adolf von Wilbrandt	Germany	[Fridolin's secret marriage] First German author presenting homosexuality in a positive light. It narrates a mutual crush between two men with a happy ending, justifying all the love options in a brash parody of Platonic dialogues, and does so in a comedy tone.
1876	Geri ou un premier amour	Louis Beysson	France	[Geri; or, A First Love] Tells us the love story between two boys -Victor and Geri- in a boarding school in Switzerland, in the middle of the 19th century. It is the first story in which a homosexual relationship is described in French literature.
1879	The Lady of The Aroostook	William Dean Howells	US	The two main characters in this novel are men in their 20s traveling together from Boston to Venice as passengers on a sailing ship, a journey six weeks long. Both are given women love-interests, but there are homoerotic elements of the men's friendship, described by the body language throughout the novel.
1881	The Sins of the Cities of the Plain	"Jack Saul" (John Saul)	UK	A pornographic novel purporting to be the memoirs of a male prostitute.
1884	À rebours	Joris-Karl Huysmans	France	[Against Nature] The narrative focuses on a single character: Jean des Esseintes, an eccentric, lonely and sick esthete, who tries to retire to an ideal artistic world created by himself.
1885	Manor: Eine Novelle	Karl Heinrich Ulrichs	Germany	[Manor] The story tells the love story between two young men, and uses vampirism and its rejection as a metaphor for homosexuality and the public reaction to it.
1885	Um Homem Gasto	"Ferreira Leal" (Lourenço Ferreira da Silva Leal)	Brazil	[A Spent Men] The unhappiness of a badly contracted marriage generates discomfort between Luiza and Alberto. In a letter from Alberto to Paulo, we learn the reasons that made him a “spent man”, a life of excesses and perversions, including homosexuality, a “nefarious error” that he began to practice in his youth.
1888	O Ateneu	Raul Pompeia	Brazil	[The Athenaeum] Depicts situational homosexuality among students in an all-male boarding school.
1888	Les Fellatores, mœurs de la décadence	"Dr. Luiz" (Paul Devaux)	France	[The Fellatores: Customs of Decadence] An unusual novel about decadence and homosexuality, in which the author paints a particularly degrading portrait of “inverts”, exaggerating their supposed characteristic features to the point of caricature, it nevertheless earned the author -and also the publisher- a year in prison and a fine of 2,000 francs for offending public morals. Tells the story of a group of handsome young gentlemen who meet at the Café de la Paix. The 2011 reissue was expanded with two appendices, Côté des dames by the same author under the pseudonym Gygès, and La Vierge-réclame by Gisèle d'Estoc (1887).
1889	A Marriage Below Zero	Alan Dale	US	A melodrama told from the point of view of a woman whose marriage is threatened by her husband's love for another man. The story ends with her husband's suicide – an early occurrence of what would become a recurring trope of gay characters dying or facing otherwise unhappy endings.
1890	The Picture of Dorian Gray	Oscar Wilde	UK	The novel's allusions to homosexuality and homosexual desire were seen as scandalous when it was first published serially in Lippincott's Monthly Magazine. Wilde subsequently made several revisions to excise homoerotic themes before the work was published in book format. An unexpurgated version was published in 2011 which further included passages deleted by an editor at Lippincott's before initial publication.
1890	O cortiço	Aluísio Azevedo	Brazil	[The Slum] Tells the stories of Portuguese and other European immigrants, mulattos, and former African slaves living and working together in a single community. Among them, it presents Albino, an effeminate male character and stereotype of the homosexual of the time, it also shows a sexual relationship between two women, the virtuous ill-fated Pombinha and the courtesan Léonie.
1890	Un exil volontaire. Un roman	Marc-André Raffalovich	France	[A Willing Exile. A Novel] Two-volume of an unusual novel about marriage and cheating with interesting cast of secondary queer characters with a completely unexpected ending.
1891	Tim: A Story of School Life	Anonymous (Howard Overing Sturgis)	UK	Describes the love of two young boys in a boarding school. It is based on the author's unhappy days at Eton. Tim of Sturgis can be considered a precursor of Maurice of Forster.
1891	O barão de Lavos	Abel Botelho	Portugal	[The Baron of Lavos] Sebastião, Baron de Lavos, one night seduces Eugénio, a sixteen-year-old boy who makes a living on the streets of Lisbon and with whom he will end up falling in love. When the boy is aware of his power over the baron, he begins to exploit it, beginning the collapse of the baron's life.
1891*	Billy Budd	Herman Melville	US	The novel remained unfinished at the author's death in 1891, was finally published in 1924. Billy Budd, a "handsome sailor", inadvertently beats and kills his false accuser, master-at-arms John Claggart. The ship's captain, Edward Vere, acknowledges Billy's lack of intent, but claims that mutiny law requires that he sentence him to hang. Many critics argue a homosexual interpretation of the relationships between the central male protagonists
1891	Left to Themselves: Being the Ordeal of Philip and Gerald	"Xavier Mayne" (Edward Irenaeus Prime-Stevenson)	US	It is considered the first Gay novel of youth literature. He recounts the friendship of two boys, Philip and Gerald, and his long trip from New York to Canada so that the latter meets his father, having to face a series of obstacles. The hidden subtext of the two boys who manage to enjoy a hopeful future in which after overcoming many difficulties will remain united forever, went unnoticed by the general public, but not for homosexual boys, who could decipher their message when they saw their own feelings in those of the protagonists.
1892	Cycle Patibulaire	Georges Eekhoud	Belgium	[The Patibular Cycle] Reedited in 1896 as Le Cycle patibulaire, was the first volume of short stories published by Eekhoud. Many of these stories contain brazen love stories between men. The book includes the stories Le Quadrille du Lancier y Partialité.
1893	Teleny, or The Reverse of the Medal	Anonymous	UK	Pornographic novel published anonymously. Believed to be the work of multiple authors, possibly including Oscar Wilde. Set in fin-de-siècle Paris, its concerns are the magnetic attraction and passionate though ultimately tragic affair between a young Frenchman named Camille Des Grieux and the Hungarian pianist René Teleny.
1893	A Florida Enchantment	Fergus Redmond and Archibald Clavering Gunter	US	It is notable for its cross-dressing lead characters, much later discussed as bisexual, lesbian, gay, and transgender.
1894	The Priest and the Acolyte	John Francis Bloxam	UK	The story details the love affair of a young Anglican priest and his lover, a 14-year-old boy. It was thought that it was authored by Oscar Wilde, which is why it was used against him during his legal proceedings.
1894	The Green Carnation	Anonymous (Robert Hichens)	UK	The novel is a Roman à clef and a gentle parody of aestheticism whose main characters, Esmé Amarinth and Lord Reginald Hastings, are based upon Oscar Wilde and his disciple, Lord Alfred Douglas.
1894	Surma uuringud	Count Eric von Stenbock	Estonia	[The True Story of a Vampire] Also known as The Sad Story of a Vampire, is inspired by Le Fanu's Carmilla, and is one of the short stories included in the collection entitled Studien zum Tod. Set in 19th century Styria. Hungarian vampire Count Vardalek visits the castle of elderly baron Wrondki and falls for Gabriel, a beautiful young boy for whom he develops a predatory passion. Vampirization is emotional, affective and materializes through a kiss.
1894	Nartsiss	Count Eric von Stenbock	Estonia	[Narcissus] One of the short stories included in the collection entitled Studien zum Tod. Tells the story of Nartsiss, a young man who was born an orphan but with a title and a fortune. A passion of his life is beauty, and he leads it to egocentrism.
1895	Bom-Crioulo	Adolfo Caminha	Brazil	[Bom-Crioulo: The Black Man and the Cabin Boy] The novel was the first major literary work on homosexuality to be published in Brazil, and one of the first to have a black person as its hero. The novel caused a stir upon its publication but was almost forgotten in the first half of the 20th century. In the second half of the 20th century, the novel has been republished several times in Brazil and translated into English, Spanish, German, French and Italian.
1895*	The Story of a Scapular	Count Eric von Stenbock	UK	[The Story of a Scapular] One of the short stories included in the collection entitled The Child of the Soul & Other Stories. Tells the story of Bernard and Francis, two monks who, upon being deposed, dedicate themselves to hedonism, but who keep their scapulars on Mount Carmel as an unusual sign of religiosity. Due to the sudden death of the author, and his subsequent censorship, the book was published until 1999.
1895	Mes Communions	Georges Eekhoud	Belgium	[My Communions] Second volume of short stories published by Eekhoud. Many of these stories contain brazen love stories between men.
1897	Himmelig Ve	Knut Hamsun	Norway	[Secret Suffering] One of the short stories included in the collection entitled Siesta. The story is very clearly about sexual desire between two men.
1898	Del amor, del dolor y del vicio	"Enrique Gómez Carrillo" (Enrique Gómez Tible)	Guatemala	[Of Love, of Pain and Vice] The second of the Three Immoral Novels, which dealt with themes such as sexuality, prostitution, and dandyism, sparked outrage in Guatemala at the time, especially this one, which critics accused of promoting homosexuality, infidelity, and sexual freedom.
1899	Escal-vigor	Georges Eekhoud	Belgium	[A Strange Love: A Novel of Abnormal Passion] The young Count Henry of Kehlmark returns to his homeland to settle in Escal-Vigor, the castle of his ancestors, located on a wild island in the North Sea. There, the aristocrat falls in love with Guidon Govaertz, a handsome peasant youth, who is rejected by his own family.
1899	Impotência	"João do Rio" (João Cristóvão dos Santos Coelho Barreto)	Brazil	[Impotence] The story explores the story of a 70-year-old man and his unfulfilled homosexual desires.
1899	Pílades e Orestes	Joaquim Maria Machado de Assis	Brazil	[Pylades and Orestes] In this short story, two friends, Quintanilha and Gonçalves, two adult men in their early thirties, who live together and, because they are single, end up falling in the mouth of the people. Everything changes when Camila appears in the story, arousing interest in one of them and bitterness in the other. The friction ends up revealing unexplored feelings for the two friends. The title makes a classic reference to the Greek love of the “pair of friends” Pylades and Orestes.
1899	Jaspar Tristram	"A.W. Clarke" (Edward Ashley Walrond Clarke)	Italy	Based on the author’s boarding school experiences at Radley College in the late 1870s. Is an extraordinary psychological study of the eponymous hero, tracing his thoughts and emotions as he proceeds from boyhood towards young adulthood: his unhappiness at school, his affection for the older boy Orr and later his love for his friend L. C. ‘Elsie’ Southwood.
1899	Monsieur Antinoüs et Madame Sapho	“Luis d’Herdy” (Louis Didier)	France	[Mr. Antinous and Mrs. Sappho] Didier's first two novels deal with homosexual relationships and the myth of androgyny through pairs of characters with complex relationships. M. Antinoüs et Mme Sapho tells the story of a marriage of convenience between Jacques de Mortheure and Marthe Barnède, both homosexuals, but who end up finding solace for their disappointed loves in the company and affection of each other. Didier's aim is to rewrite the Platonic myth of the androgyne and at the same time desexualise marital relations between men and women. The two homosexual characters, Jacques and Marthe, find in their marriage of convenience a tenderness and complicity that soften the painful impossibility of their inverted loves.
1899	L’Homme-Sirène	“Luis d’Herdy” (Louis Didier)	France	[The Mermaid Man] Both of Didier's novels deal with homosexual relationships, but this second novel takes the theme of androgyny much further, as it describes the gradual destruction of the marriage between Jeanne and Georges d'Athis by a young dandy, Édouard d'Ore, strongly inspired by Jean Des Esseintes, from the novel À rebours. The androgyny claimed by the dandies that d'Herdy chooses as main characters corresponds with the sisterhood of the female figures introduced through the theme of collaboration. His contemporaries saw in these novels true studies of “legal medicine” rather than literary works that sought to provoke and subvert bourgeois morality from a decadent perspective.
1899	Voskreséniye	Count Lev Nikolayevich Tolstoy	Russia	[Resurrection; or, The Awakening] Tolstoy intended the novel as a panoramic view of Russia at the end of the 19th century from the highest to the lowest levels of society and as an exposition of the injustice of man-made laws and the hypocrisy of the institutionalized church. In one part of the novel, when Dmitri Nekhlyudov goes to prison to visit Katyusha, he meets other prisoners and listens to their stories. Among them he meets an artist convicted for having sex with his students, but given a lenient sentence; and a Russian activist for gay rights as examples of the widespread corruption and immorality in Tsarist Russia.

== 20th century ==
=== 1900s ===
Year	Title	Author	Country	Notes
1900	Ercole Tomei	"Fritz Geron Pernauhm" (Guido Hermann Eckardt)	Germany	The novel follows musician Ercole Tomei and the sometimes pedantic professor Gerhart Büchner, who fell in love in highschool. After Ercole's marriage, Büchner confines himself to the role of the good family friend, but his jealousy awakens when Ercole makes new friends with men.
1900	Ódio, ou Páginas de um diário	"João do Rio" (João Cristóvão dos Santos Coelho Barreto)	Brazil	[Hate, or Pages from a Diary] It is about a man named Fábio who remembers the mixture of desire and contempt he felt for his neighbor for years.
1900	La Destinée	“Luis d’Herdy” (Louis Didier)	France	[Destiny] In this autobiographical novel, or autofictional account, the spirit of Louis d’Herdy shines through in the figure of a dandy pianist famous for his mysterious elegance, barely disguised under the pseudonym of Lucien d’Everly. In La Destinée the figure of the female double becomes more explicit. Although the main character has a mother, a sister and a potential fiancée, all these female roles are relegated to the background compared to the mysterious figure of the sexagenarian landlady, concierge and occultist in her spare time, Madame Verlet. She becomes a true initiator of the character and a complex tutelary figure throughout the novel. Women allow the meeting of the two poles of a desexualized androgyne, thus resolving the erotic crisis of the end of the century, haunted by the spectre of impotence and lack of love.
1900	Gotická duše	Jiří Karásek ze Lvovic	Austria-Hungary	[A Gothic Mind]
1901	Dédé	Achille Essebac	France	Marcel Thellier, an adult in his thirties, tells of the astonishment he felt at the beauty of a comrade, André Dalio -affectionately nicknamed Dédé- from the time they met at the age of fourteen until his early death at the age of sixteen.
1901	The History of Sir Richard Calmady	"Lucas Malet" (Mary St Leger Kingsley)	UK	The novel was shocking in this moment because the protagonist is disabled and portrays the frank depiction of his quest for romantic and sexual fulfilment. Richard struggles to come to terms with his disability, and after an abortive attempt to marry a neighbouring aristocrat's daughter, he undertakes a ‘Rake's Progress’ around Europe, giving himself up to dissipation. The novel was based on the life of Arthur MacMurrough Kavanagh.
1901	Claudine à Paris	"Colette" (Sidonie-Gabrielle Colette) and "Willy" (Henry Gauthier-Villars)	France	[Claudine in Paris] Written in diary form, they describe the growth to maturity of a young girl, Claudine. This is the second book in the series, in which Claudine and her father leave their village of Montigny-le-Fresnois to settle in Paris, where the young woman recovers from an illness that cost her her beautiful long hair. In this book, an effeminate gay character, Marcel, appears, becoming her friend and later her stepson.
1902	L'Immoraliste	André Gide	France	[The Immoralist] Narrates the story of Michel, his recovery from tuberculosis; his attraction to a series of Algerian boys and to his estate caretaker's are his; and the evolution of a new perspective on life and society.
1902	Mikaël	Herman Bang	Denmark	[Michael] In Paris at the end of the 19th century, the painter Claude Zoret leads a life of celebrity and luxury with his protégé, the young Czech Mikaël. They are at the same time father and adopted son, teacher and student, painter and model, and lovers. Everything is going well until, unfortunately, the young man falls madly in love with the Russian princess, Lucia Zamikov.
1902	Extravagância	"Symphrônio Perillo"	Brazil	[Extravagance] One of the short stories included in the collection entitled A casadinha. Tells the story of a man who decides to have sex with a sex worker nicknamed Oscar, and who the next morning gives little importance to the fact by stating that it was just an "extravagance".
1903	Tonio Kröger	Thomas Mann	Germany	The novel has unequivocally autobiographical features, and sees an insurmountable contrast between art and the bourgeoisie. Tonio's conflict is not limited to his social and artistic identity, but also to his sexual one. His friendship with Hans Hansen has a homoerotic resonance. The subject of homosexuality is not dealt with explicitly but tabooed: Tonio descends into lust and feels guilty, without explaining what happened.
1904	Belchamber	Howard Overing Sturgis	UK	The story follows the life of Sainty, Marquis of Belchamber, he is shy, physically weak, likes knitting and dislikes sports. The Noblesse oblige to marry, however, it turns out that they find it disgusting and the marriage is not consummated.
1904	The Island of Tranquil Delights: A South Sea Idyl and Others	Charles Warren Stoddard	US	Is a collection of his homoerotic tales of the olive-skinned natives of the South Seas.
1904	Anders als die Andern	"Bill Forster" (Hermann Breuer)	Germany	[Unlike The Others] The primary student Herbert Wolters falls in love with the tertiary student Erich Mertens, who feels flattered but cannot return the feelings. When Herbert is reciting poems in a literary circle and he is asked which hot-blooded creature these verses are about, he replies: 'This girl is a boy!' A mocking 'Graf Platen' resounds at him, and his bourgeois existence is destroyed.
1904	Der junge Kurt	"Fritz Geron Pernauhm" (Guido Hermann Eckardt)	Germany	[The Young Kurt] Hehrmeister, a well-travelled composer, has returned to Riga, where he meets 17-year-old Kurt. He only realizes how deep his feelings for Kurt are after he lets his mother catch him. Before the confusion of his feelings, he wants to flee to Paris – for Kurt a double betrayal that breaks him. Due to the author's Baltic German origin, it can be considered one of the first gay novels from the Baltic countries.
1904	L'Autre Vue	Georges Eekhoud	Belgium	[The Other View] Laurent Paridael is a young man from a good bourgeois family, who is completely out of touch with his environment, and prefers to hang out with thugs from working-class neighborhoods. He is seduced by their freedom, their lack of culture, but also by the slenderness of their bodies, their naturally graceful gestures and wild charm. The book was reedited in 1926 under the title Voyous de velours ou L'autre vue.
1905	The Garden God – A Tale of Two Boys	Forrest Reid	UK	Graham is a friendless boy whose only companion is an imaginary character, a Greek boy, who visits him while he sleeps. At sixteen he enters a boarding school to continue his training, and there, his secret and invisible companion disappears during his sleep. But one day he meets Harold, another student at the school who, to his surprise, turns out to be the living embodiment of his imaginary friend.
1905	Messes noires. Lord Lyllian	Baron Jacques d'Adelswärd-Fersen	France	[Black Masses. Lord Lyllian] The author conceived the work as a satire of the scandal that led him to jail and exile. The young Lord Lyllian is seduced by Harold Skilde who embarks him on an authentic odyssey of sexual debauchery, which will lead him to share his body with men and women. Not without humour, it is a Roman à clef in which many reputedly homosexual characters appear under almost transparent transposed names: Supp (Friedrich Alfred Krupp), Sar Baladin (Joséphin Péladan), Montautrou (Robert de Montesquiou), Achille Patrac (Achille Essebac), Chignon (Édouard Chimot), Claude Skrimpton (Claude Simpson), Guy de Payen (Albert François Hamelin de Warren), Jean d'Alsace (Jean Lorrain), among others.
1905	The Hill: A Romance of Friendship	Horace Annesley Vachell	UK	The story gives an idealized view of life at Harrow and of the homoerotic friendship between two boys, two boys compete for the love of a third. The story exalts aristocracy, constantly talks about importance of “breeding” and explains all of the shortcomings of Scaife’s character by his low birth.
1906	Die Verwirrungen des Zöglings Törleß	Robert Musil	Austria-Hungary	[The Confusions of Young Törless] Depicts homosexuality in an Austrian boarding school. First English translation published in 1955. A German film adaptation was released in 1966.
1906	Imre: A Memorandum	"Xavier Mayne" (Edward Irenaeus Prime-Stevenson)	US	Notable for being among the earliest sympathetic portrayals of homosexuality. The main characters, lovers Imre and Oswald, are happy and united at the end of the story. Only a small printing of 500 copies was issued in Italy (Stevenson was an American writing in Europe). Reissued in 2003.
1906	Kryl'ya	Mikhail Kuzmin	Russia	[Wings] The novel deals with teenager Vanya Smurov's attachment to his older, urbane mentor, Larion Stroop, a pederast who initiates him into the world of early Renaissance, Classical and Romantic art. The book became one of the first “coming out” stories to have a happy ending and his private journals provide a detailed view of a gay subculture, involving men of all classes.
1906	O Sr. Ganimedes	Alfredo Gallis	Portugal	[Mr. Ganymede] A shy and effeminate boy, Leonel, grows up to become a slender and elegant young man who makes all the maidens of Lisbon sigh. But Leonel is in love with Liberato, a corpulent, rude, fighting man with a bushy mustache, who likes to see him dressed like a fine lady.
1906	Los cuarenta y uno: novela crítico-social	"Eduardo A. Castrejón"	Mexico	[The Forty-One: A Critical-Social Novel] Five years after the Ball of the Forty-One, this work came out that reproduced the atmosphere of scandal, and in a satirical, moralizing and denigrating tone, it delves us into the perception of contemporaries of the event. The story imagines the planning and development of the ball.
1906	Die Infamen	"Fritz Geron Pernauhm" (Guido Hermann Eckardt)	Germany	[The Infamous] With many references to time, the novel describes the adaptation strategies of middle-class homosexuals in the mid-19th century who live in Berlin in their own secret world or who only dare to be themselves when traveling abroad. Richard, a young musician, does not want to be satisfied with "the happiness of catacomb dwellers". His openness also compromises his friends.
1907	Le baiser de Narcisse	Baron Jacques d'Adelswärd-Fersen	France	[The Kiss of Narcissus] Set in Ancient Greece, it tells us the life of Myles, a boy born in Byblos destined to be a priest in the temple of Adonis, but after fleeing he will end up in Athens as a slave.
1907	Aus der Freundschaft sonnigsten Tagen Der Liebling Kurt	"Hans Waldau"	Germany	[From the Friendship; or, From the Sunniest Days of Friendship of Darling Kurt] Tells the story of the joint journey of two young men who then remain friends from afar.
1907*	Une jeunesse	Baron Jacques d'Adelswärd-Fersen	France	[A Youth] The plot revolves around Robert Jélaine, a twenty-three-year-old French painter who is in love with Nino, a sixteen-year-old seminarian. The antagonists of the couple are Father Seraphino, also in love with Nino, and a girl, Michaëla, whom Nino loves. In the end, the girl dies and Nino is forced to suffer confinement and solitude in a seminary in Verona, but in that city he will also have the opportunity to experience new relationships. The Baron began writing it in the summer of 1905 in Taormina, during a trip to Sicily, and finished it the following year in Oxford, but it would not be published until his return to Paris in 1907, and is dedicated to his secretary and long-time lover, Nino Cesarini.
1907	Román Manfreda Macmillena	Jiří Karásek ze Lvovic	Austria-Hungary	[The Story of Manfred Macmillen] The first of the three wizard novels (Romány tří mágů). A decadent dandy, the noble Manfred Macmillen, is haunted by visions that he is one of many reincarnations of the long-dead wizard, the demonic Count Cagliostro, a protégé of his grandfather. His journey in his footsteps takes him to Prague, where he is also haunted as a ghost by the mysterious stranger Walter More, who may also be an incarnation of the old wizard, or Manfred's shadowy alter ego, whose magical practices he eventually cannot resist.
1908	Homoszexuális szerelem – Tuzár detektív naplója	Guthi Soma	Austria-Hungary	[Homosexual Love – Detective Tuzár's Diary] The novel revolves around a tragic love story between two well-placed gentlemen. Gúthi was inspired to write his tragedy by the Harden-Eulenburg Affair that broke out in 1906. Is considered one of the earliest gay novels in Hungary.
1908	Allegoria di novembre	Aldo Palazzeschi	Italy	[Allegory of November; or Riflessi] The novel revolves around the figure of Prince Valentino Core, abandoned by his English friend and lover John/Johnny, he returns to his villa abandoned for years and locks himself up there, with the passage of time he becomes increasingly visionary and almost paranoid.
1908	Pathologieën: De ondergang van Johan van Vere de With	Jacob Israël de Haan	Netherlands	[Pathologies: The Downfall of Johan van Vere de With] The adolescent Johan lives a secluded life with his father and their elderly housekeeper in a large house. For a number of years Johan has been plagued by erotic fantasies and dreams about classmates, which he finds deeply worrying. After feeling attracted to his father, he decides to leave home and meets René, a confident young artist. Johan falls madly in love and the two men enter into a sadomasochistic relationship.
1908*	O bebê da tarlatana rosa	"João do Rio" (João Cristóvão dos Santos Coelho Barreto)	Brazil	[The Baby of the Pink Tarlatana] One of the short stories included in the collection entitled Dentro da noite, published in 1910. In this story, the protagonist, Heitor de Alencar, meets a woman during the Brazilian Carnival who is wearing a pink tarlatan and a baby mask, but upon touching her, he discovers that she is actually a man in disguise with a deformity. The story unfolds during Carnival, in a dissolute, fantastical environment where the anonymity of the masks allows for extreme behavior and people conceal their true nature.
1908	Scarabaeus	Jiří Karásek ze Lvovic	Austria-Hungary	[The Beetle] It is the second novel in the symbolist and decadent trilogy Romány tří mágů (The Three Magicians' Novels). In Venice, young Gaston falls in love with Orestes, who is thus freed from his unequal relationship with the cynical and cruel Marcel for a time. When Oreste disappears, the search leads Gaston to Marcel's abandoned Ducal Palace. There Marcel organizes secret ceremonies of the cult of the goddess Isis, whom he serves and whose sanctuary is underground.
1909	Narkiss	Jean Lorrain	France	[Narcissus] Tale containing subtle homoeroticism that transfers the myth of Narcissus to Pharaonic Egypt. Narkiss, prince of Egypt, son and grandson of pharaohs, possesses superhuman beauty. He carries within him the blood of the great goddess Isis, for this reason, the priests of his cult took him away from his mother to keep him in an ancient sanctuary of Osiris, where he is kept cloistered, without contact or knowledge of his real birth, even away from anything that could reflect him.
1909	Wita sekusuarisu	"Mori Ōgai" (Mori Rintarō)	Japan	[Vita Sexualis] It is a story about a philosophy professor, Shikuza Kanai, who recalls his passage from childhood to adulthood, focusing on those moments that affected his sexual awakening.

=== 1910s ===
Year	Title	Author	Country	Notes
1910	Lucien	"Binet-Valmer" (Jean-Auguste-Gustave Binet)	Switzerland	Lucien Vigier is the son of a famous psychiatrist who tries to establish himself as an artist, but fails miserably and is too clumsy even to commit suicide. Behind him is the masculine, self-assured -and dissolute- Reginald Lovell, who helps Lucien leap to freedom at the last moment.
1910	Lyudi 1890-kh godov	Alexander Valentinovich Amfiteatrov	Russia	[People of the 1890s; or, The Sunset of the Old Century] At the time of publication, the prevailing public opinion—heavily influenced by the Eastern Orthodox Church—was that homosexuality was a sign of corruption, decadence, and immorality. The novel reflects this prejudice with two gay characters: a masculine lesbian attorney and a decadent gay poet, capturing both the social prejudices and the Bohemian subcultures of the era. The work acts as a critical, and frequently satirical, reflection on the Russian intelligentsia and the cultural ethos of the late nineteenth century.
1911	La fuente envenenada	Alberto Nin Frías	Uruguay	[The Poisoned Fountain] The novel tells the story of a very intimate friendship, set in Paris, between two young men, the Greek writer Sordello Andrea and the Cuban Jorge de la Torre, a boy with a dissolute life. The text is replete with literary and artistic codes and allusions for educated homosexual men capable of understanding them.
1911*	Les Fréquentations de Maurice: Mœurs de Londres	"Sidney Place" (Xavier Marcel Boulestin)	France	[Maurice's Frequentations] The text follows the amoral Maurice Verdal, an androgynous dandy and man about town, member of a picturesque homosexual subculture in Edwardian London, and of a society on the verge of disappearing, made up of wealthy, frivolous and socially insensitive characters, who move in elitist and desirable environments. This novel, published in 1911, first appeared in serial format in 1909 in the magazine Akademos.
1912	Der Tod in Venedig	Thomas Mann	Germany	[Death in Venice] The main character, an aging writer, develops an infatuation with a beautiful adolescent boy. Subject of a number of adaptations, most notably a 1971 film by Luchino Visconti.
1912	La vejez de Heliogábalo	Antonio de Hoyos y Vinent	Spain	[The Old Age of Heliogabalus] Claudio, Count of Medina la Vieja, a weak, cerebral and perverse hero, who moves between the sublime and the grotesque, seeks to enjoy his latest passion.
1912	Les Libertins d'Anvers: Légende et histoire des Loïstes	Georges Eekhoud	Belgium	[The Antwerp Libertines: Legend and History of the Loists] Set in the 16th century, it follows the story of the roofer Éloi Pruystinck -called Loïet le Couvreur- prophet of an anarchic movement, which constitutes the center of the Antwerp Libertines, nicknamed Loïstes. This historical novel contains notions of homosexuality.
1913	À la recherche du temps perdu	Marcel Proust	France	[In Search of Lost Time] Some critics surmise that the narrator is presented as a closeted homosexual. The first chapter of the fourth volume includes a detailed account of a sexual encounter between two men. Proust himself was gay, but not publicly.
1913	Marcos, amador de la belleza	Alberto Nin Frías	Spain	[Marcos, Lover of Beauty] The homoerotism of this novel is diffuse, and spiritual, but can be clearly decoded by those aware of the code.
1913*	Maurice	Edward Morgan Forster	UK	Written between 1913 and 1914, but not published until 1971, after Forster's death (Forster's homosexuality was not publicly known during his lifetime), Maurice follows the story of an Edwardian young man and his self discovery of love and life as a homosexual in a repressed society. It is one of the first gay novels with a happy ending. It was adapted as a movie in 1987, and was nominated for several awards.
1913	Ein Jünger Platos: Aus dem Leben eines Entgleisten	"Konradin"	Germany	[A Disciple of Plato: From the Life of a Derailed] Tells the story of Theodor Reinhold, a student who arouses "reddening love" in the young count's son Lorenzo, which he does not know how to deal with.
1913	Fenny Skaller: Ein Leben der namenlosen Liebe	John Henry Mackay	Germany	[Fenny Skaller: A life of nameless love] Fenny Skaller, a man in his forties, looks back on his life. Through photos, he relives disappointments and happy moments, he recalls gradually realizing that he loves boys between the ages of 14 and 17. The novel has autobiographical traits.
1914	The Prussian Officer	David Herbert Lawrence	UK	The plot is very simple and describes the consequences that non-assumed homosexuality can cause when sexual desire appears in a violent character. A military captain feeling an acute sexual tension towards one subordinate does everything to prevent him from seriously engaging in the relationship.
1914	Kokoro	"Natsume Sōseki" (Natsume Kin'nosuke)	Japan	[Heart] The work deals with the transition from the Japanese Meiji society to the modern era; by exploring the subtle friendship between a young man and an older man he calls "Sensei".
1914	Aus dem Liebesleben zweier Freunde	"Theo von Tempesta"	Germany	[From the Love Life of Two Friends] Tells of the inner struggle of a man "noble Uranian who will not give in to his inclination" and flees to the country to be safe from any temptation.
1914	Jésus-la-Caille	"Francis Carco" (François Carcopino-Tusoli)	France	[Jesus the Quail] Paris, 1910s, Jesus-la-Caille, a young gigolo from the Montmartre district, has just lost his protector and lover, Bambou. Turned upside down by this misadventure, he falls in love with Fernande, a prostitute and "môme" from Dominique-le-Corse, pimp of her state.
1914	Seelenwanderung	Jules Siber	Germany	[Soul Wandering; or, Transmigration of Souls] Tells the story of a brilliant violinist and his search for a young painter, obsessed with the unfinished painting of a Dutch painter burned alive for Sodomy in 1654.
1914	A Confissão de Lúcio	Mário de Sá-Carneiro	Portugal	[Lucio's Confession] Tells the story of the complex love/sexual/mental relationship of the ménage à trois between Lucius, Martha, Richard. The narrator, Lúcio Vaz, seeks to claim his innocence after having served ten years in prison for the alleged murder of the poet Ricardo de Loureiro.
1914	O menino do Gouveia	"Capadocio Maluco"	Brazil	[Gouveia's boy] Cappadocio is a man who visits a prostitute named Bembem, who tells him the story of his life and his tireless sexual desire. It is considered the first Brazilian homosexual pornographic story, it has been claimed in recent years for its pioneering nature, for dealing with homosexuality, transsexuality and pedophilia.
1914	Desert Dreamers: a Romance of Friendship	"Patrick Weston" (Gerald Hamilton)	UK	It tells of a beautiful and passionate romance between an Arab teenager, Tayeb ben Mahmud, a guide for wealthy tourists in the Algerian city of Biskra, and a rich 22-year-old Englishman, Julian Thelluson, who will see his rigid moral code shaken by the onslaught of the feelings that the boy awakens in him, to which he will succumb without the possibility of opposition. Possibly inspired by the true story experienced in 1895 by Lord Alfred Douglas, Oscar Wilde's lover, with a young and beautiful Algerian boy named Ali.
1915	El martirio de San Sebastián	Antonio de Hoyos y Vinent	Spain	[The Martyrdom of Saint Sebastian] Narrates life in a sordid brothel in the Chinatown of Barcelona at the beginning of the 20th century where a young boy, Silverio, who is nicknamed El Bonito (literally "The Beautiful") works as a servant. He is referred to as an effeminate and narcissistic "ephebe", his beauty is contrasted with that of the prostitutes.
1915	La sombra inquieta	"Alone" (Hernán Díaz Arrieta)	Chile	[The Restless Shadow] Novel that includes the first effeminate character in Chilean national literature.
1916	The Romance of a Choir-Boy	John Gambril Nicholson	UK	Written sometime between 1896 and 1905, and privately printed in 1916. It follows the relationship between the adult Philip and young schoolboy Teddy. The story frequently includes detailed descriptions of church affairs and cricket matches.
1916	David Blaize	Edward Frederic Benson	UK	The novel follows David’s career as a schoolboy from Prep school to public school and ends just before he leaves for university. Thematically it has a lot of burgeoning homoerotic sentiments. David and his friend Frank have a full-fledged bromance, but without sex, seen as "beastly". Another friend of David's is expelled for carnality, but by the end of the novel he has reformed and he has made it into a military academy.
1917	The Loom of Youth	Alec Waugh	UK	Thought to be the first English-language work depicting homosexuality between students in boarding school. A best seller, in part because its subject matter provoked a scandal.
1918	Efebos	Karol Szymanowski	Poland	[Ephebes] Two-volume novel that has unfortunately been lost, the plot was the homosexual love affairs of Prince Ali Lowicki, in Italy. It contained a series of autobiographical motifs and was dedicated to his lover, Boris Kochno. He did not attempt to publish the novel during her mother's lifetime and, before his death, he gave the manuscript to his friend Jarosław Iwaszkiewicz, who in turn refrained from publishing the text for the same reason. The manuscript was burned in September 1939, during the invasion of Poland. Only one of the chapters -given to Kochno- has survived.
1918	Den alten Göttern zu. Ein Platen-Roman	Hans von Hülsen	Germany	[To the Old Gods. A Platen's novel] The novel recounts the formative years of the poet August von Platen-Hallermünde as a student in Würzburg and Erlangen come to life.
1918	Despised and Rejected	"A.T. Fitzroy" (Rose Laure Allatini)	UK	The sexuality of many of the characters in the book is represented as unstable, in a way unusual for the period. Antoinette at first has a passionate crush on an older woman, and then falls for Dennis Blackwood, a homosexual who had previously courted her, partly as a disguise for his actual sexuality, and partly in the hope that she might 'cure' him.
1919	Bertram Cope's Year	Henry Blake Fuller	US	Bertram Cope, an attractive but socially unaware and lacking confidence young English instructor becomes the elusive object of desire, either social or sexual or some combination of the two, for an older woman, two older men, and three young women.
1919	Las «locas» de postín	Álvaro Retana	Spain	[The Posh "Crazies"] Rafael Hinojosa de Cebreros, the vicious son of some marquises feels fascinated by a mysterious Argentine with whom his friends have set him up on a date just to get his money. Set in the posh, decadent, gay circles of Madrid, the novel parades all types of characters: blue-blooded fairies, famous circus and cabaret performers, bohemian writers, etc.
1919	Los extravíos de Tony: Confesiones amorales de un colegial ingenuo	Álvaro Retana	Spain	[The Misplacements of Tony: Amoral Confessions of a Naive Schoolboy] Antonio "Tony" Fontanar is a sixteen-year-old boy from an aristocratic school in Madrid who keeps a diary and tells how he ends up in jail along with his classmates whom he calls them "the Duchesses".
1919	Valmouth	Ronald Firbank	UK	Tells the effects of a black woman and her niece moving into a spa resort inhabited by wealthy centenarians. The novel is noted for its florid and baroque style and parody-like humour, and its sexual innuendos both heterosexual and homosexual. There is also a fanciful brand of Catholicism, a blend of mortification of the flesh, high-flown mysticism, and proselytism.

=== 1920s ===
Year	Title	Author	Country	Notes
1920	Women in Love	David Herbert Lawrence	UK	The sisters Ursula and Gudrun Brangwen meet two men who live nearby, school inspector Rupert Birkin and Gerald Crich, heir to a coal mine, and start a relationship. But, they have a strong emotional relationship, which is deepened and developed by their physical and psychological attraction to each other.
1920	Wo hast du dich denn herumgetrieben?	“Pfarrer Silesius” (Hans Siemsen)	Germany	[Where did you hang around?] In the novel he combines personal experiences of the First World War with travel accounts and autobiographical material. The book's cover, showing a young man in a suit and tie wearing stiletto heels, seems devoid of context compared to its content. The book conveys a depressed mood, contains two descriptions of a repressive environment and a non-existent homosexuality.
1920	The Dark Mother	Waldo Frank	US	Thomas Rennard, a lawyer from New York meets David Markand while vacationing. Markand's mother has recently died and he plans to move to New York. After arriving in New York, an intense love triangle of sorts plays out among Markand, Thomas Rennard and his sister Cornelia. Although the homosexual nature of the relationship is never mentioned, the reader can feel its strong presence.
1920	Das erotische Komödiengärtlein	"Granand" (Erwin von Busse)	Germany	[Erotic Comedy Garden] Its five stories depict a variety of sexually charged encounters between men, with characters that range from military school cadets and dance-hall regulars to a foreign businessman and a burglar. Promptly banned for "indecency", it was not republished until 1993 and only appeared in an English translation as Berlin Garden of Erotic Delights in 2022.
1920*	Ver-Vert	Filippo de Pisis	Italy	Fragments for an unwritten novel, diary pages from De Pisis' Roman period (1919–1926). Notes, annotations, illuminations on boys, on love, and on male beauty, indulged with inexhaustible lust. The story follows Felipe (an alter ego of the author), dealing with Rome in the twenties, at age 25. The text was published until 1984 by his niece Bona de Pisis and by the editor Sandro Zanotto. It is considered an "artist novel".
1920	Sodom	Egmont Colerus	Austria	The novel is a fantastic pseudo-historical story taking place in the last days of the doomed city itself, and featuring seduction, betrayal, murder, and cannibalism, among other such topics.
1920	Dernières Kermesses	Georges Eekhoud	Belgium	[Last Fairs] Third novel of the Fairs trilogy, this one has hints of admiration for the masculine.
1920	El hombre que parecía un caballo	Rafael Arévalo Martínez	Guatemala	[The Man Who Resembled a Horse] The short story purports to be the satirical portrait of Colombian poet Porfirio Barba-Jacob, who is given the character of a blaspheming, egotistical, and amoral man. The story's power lies in the delirious and oblique account of homoerotic desire. The protagonist's resemblance to a horse embraces his graceful, yet brutal sexuality and his total disregard for morality.
1921	El infierno de hielo	Álvaro Retana	Spain	[Ice Hell] A young writer meets three beautiful siblings: a blonde girl, a little brunette woman and an attractive young man with blue eyes. The three suggest he indulge in perverse sexual pleasures.
1922	Los ambiguos	Álvaro Retana	Spain	[The Ambiguous].
1922	Sodome et Gomorrhe	Marcel Proust	France	[Sodom and Gomorrah] In the fourth volume of Proust's monumental work, the homosexual inclination of Baron de Charlus, the narrator's uncle, in love first with Jupien, and later with the violinist named Morel, is addressed.
1923	Kyra Kyralina	Panait Istrati	Romania	[Chira Chiralina; or Kyra My Sister] Stavro -whose real name is Dragomir- who is the younger brother of Kyra Kyralina, shows sexual desire towards a young man named Adrian Zografi, and after being rejected, tells his story to the young man and that of his sister. Istrati was the first Romanian author to write a novel in which a character is homosexual.
1923	Mi novia y mi novio	Álvaro Retana	Spain	[My Girlfriend and my Boyfriend] A young man meets a pair of siblings with whom he begins a relationship at the same time.
1923	The Blind Bow-Boy	Carl Van Vechten	US	The sheltered young man Harold Prewett, is given unlimited funds by his father to learn about life and himself. His father also finds him a mentor in Paul Moody who was employed by him specifically because he was “of good character but no model sense” and have been involved in a public scandal. In other words, a Bohemian and, thus, he will find himself involved with a motley crew of oddballs.
1923	L'Ersatz d'amour	"Willy" (Henry Gauthier-Villars) and "Ménalkas" (Suzanne de Callias)	France	[The Substitute for Love] During the First World War, a soldier comes to leave the Parisian painter Simon-Pierre with a manuscript, saying that he will come back later. This manuscript was intended for him by his friend Marc Revenal, in it he tells the story of Marc with the German officer Carl von Rudorff. The soldier returns two hours later an announces to him that Marc died in the war during a perilous mission.
1923	La corrección de menores	Francisco Herrera Velado	El Salvador	[The Correction of Minors] One of the short stories included in the collection entitled Mentiras y verdades. Tells the story of Luis/Luisa, a man who is raised as a girl and who over the years lives in constant transition between both genders. Later, Luis becomes a poet and decides to write the story of his "old life as a transvestite".
1923	Das Tigerschiff	“Pfarrer Silesius” (Hans Siemsen)	Germany	[The Tiger Ship] His erotically tender “boy stories” published by Querschnitt-Verlag, were illustrated by Renee Sintenis. Her tender and restrained drawings on the cover and inside vividly convey the homoerotic mood of the texts in the field of tension between friendship and eroticism. Siemsen's language in this work is impressive due to its succinct, very precise depiction of events; no word is too much.
1924	Pasión y muerte del Cura Deusto	"Augusto d'Halmar" (Augusto Jorge Goeminne Thomson)	Spain	[Passion and Death of the Priest Deusto] The priest Deusto has to decide between his vows to the Church and his love to the gypsy Miguelillo, who corresponds his feelings.
1924	La débauche	André Birabeau	France	[Debauchery] The first novel about a homosexual man from the mother's point of view. Translated into English as Revelation in 1930.
1924	Le Naufragé	"Willy" (Henry Gauthier-Villars) and "Ménalkas" (Suzanne de Callias)	France	[The Shipwreck] The novel is set during the German Revolution of 1918-1919 and the revival of the homosexual movement. Sequel to L'Ersatz d'amour, it follows the story of the aristocrat Carl von Rudorff who returns from self-exile and finds himself in post-war Europe.
1924	The Apple of the Eye	Glenway Wescott	US	The novel has autobiographical features. Wescott shows his reflections on the rural Wisconsin of his childhood, where he opposes a repressed puritanism in search of a more sensual appreciation of life. The homoeroticism is very subtle, but there are enough clues to make it obvious that Dan Strane is same-sex attracted, though the book ends with his having, apparently, no more than inklings about the nature of his desire.
1924	Cākleṭ	"Ugra" (Pandey Bechan Sharma)	India	[Chocolate] Published in the magazine Matvala ("Intoxicated"). The story describes an illicit sexual relationship between Babu Dinkar Prasad, an upper-class Hindu man, and “a beautiful lad of thirteen of fourteen”. Ugra claimed that his representations of homoeroticism were intended to reveal and hence eradicate Indian homosexuality. However, many readers were scandalised that Ugra had discussed homosexuality at all, believing that by doing so, he was promoting it.
1925	Les Faux-monnayeurs	André Gide	France	[The Counterfeiters] The novel features a considerable number of bisexual or gay male characters. An important part of the plot is its depiction of various possibilities of positive and negative homoerotic or homosexual relationships.
1925	The Western Shore	Clarkson Crane	US	A story set at UC Berkeley, featuring a gay professor as a major character (possibly modeled after Crane), and other characters of ambiguous sexual orientation. Not commercially or critically successful.
1925	Die Symphonie des Eros	Erich Ernst	Germany	[Symphony of the Eros]
1925	Hanymed	Jiří Karásek ze Lvovic	Czechoslovakia	[Ganymede] It is a variation of the Golem myth, in which a sculptor revives his sculpture of a handsome young man, as a form of compensation for his own physical ugliness. Tells the story of Radovan, who is very attracted to the charismatic Adrian Morris, who belongs to his mother's circle. Adrian, interested in the secrets of Rodolphinian Prague, meets the sculptor Jörn Moller, who has solved the mystery of how to revive the golem – of which Radovan is the model – with the help of the Kabbalah. Ganymedes is the last novel in the trilogy Romány tří magů (Novels of Three Mages), preceded by the novels Román Mandreda McMillena (1907) and Scarabaeus (1908).
1925	Pijpelijntjes	Jacob Israël de Haan	Netherlands	[Lines from De Pijp] The novel was intended to be a thinly veiled version of his own gay life with Arnold Aletrino in the working-class “Pijp” district of Amsterdam.
1925	Firecrackers. A Realistic Novel	Carl Van Vechten	US	During 1924, a blasé coterie of pleasure-seeking sophisticates are inordinately excited by a handsome and athletic newcomer to their social circle, Gunnar O'Grady, “a youth with the appearance of a Greek Adonis”, becoming an object of sexual fascination to many within the circle.
1926	Der Puppenjunge	John Henry Mackay	Germany	[The Hustler] Günther is fifteen years old when, running away from home, he arrives in Berlin in the 1920s, where he discovers the many boys who prostitute themselves in the streets of the center, finding in this way of life a way of surviving that will not always be easy.
1926	Der fromme Tanz	Klaus Mann	Germany	[The Pious Dance] The eighteen-year-old poet Andreas travels to Berlin to discover big city life. There he immersed himself in bohemianism and tried to process the hopes and goals of his generation in literature. Is considered one of the first German-language homosexual novels.
1926	Un hombre muerto a puntapiés	Pablo Palacio	Ecuador	[The Man Who Was Kicked to Death] The narrator of the story finds out through the local press about the murder of a man named Octavio Ramírez, who was classified as "vicious", he is interested in discovering the reasons for his death and becomes obsessed with discovering "what kind of vice" the deceased had, since the newspaper does not mention it.
1926	Smoke, Lilies, and Jade	Richard Bruce Nugent	US	The short story was written in a modernist stream-of-consciousness style. Its subject matter was bisexuality and more specifically interracial male desire. Was the first story by an African-American writer to openly declare his homosexuality.
1926	Concerning the Eccentricities of Cardinal Pirelli	Ronald Firbank	UK	Firbank's last novel, published posthumously. It is set in Spain, and tells of the Cardinal's 'eccentricities' include the baptism of pet dogs in his cathedral and a passion for choir-boys.
1927	Verwirrung der Gefühle	Stefan Zweig	Germany	[Confusion of Feelings] A renowned professor is honored on his sixtieth birthday for his long career full of success and achievements. But inside him he keeps a youthful secret, an episode that occurred when he was in his teens.
1927	Vestal Fire	Compton Mackenzie	UK	The novel is a Roman à clef, is set on the island of Sirene (a barely disguised fictional version of Capri), accounts the arrival of a French count of dubious origin, Robert "Bob" Marsac Lagerström, who was invited by a lesbian couple, Miss Virginia and Maimie Pepworth-Norton, who lives in Villa Amabile. It was inspired by the time Mackenzie had spent living in Capri before the First World War.
1927	Verbotene Liebe	“Pfarrer Silesius” (Hans Siemsen)	Germany	[Forbidden Love] For the novel, Siemsen drew letters from a young Swiss painter residing in Germany, arrested in March 1921 and accused of violating article 175 of the Penal Code. He hanged himself in his cell and left behind a bundle of letters that ended up in Siemsen's possession in a roundabout way.
1927	Glück: Ein Roman d. Freundesliebe	Max Schneider	Germany	[Happiness: A Novel of Friends Love]
1927	Las noches en el palacio de la nunciatura	Rafael Arévalo Martínez	Guatemala	[The Nights in the Nunciature Palace] Manuel Aldano, a man immersed in the spiritualist and esoteric currents of his time, begins a romantic relationship and intellectual attraction with the almost divine figure of the Lord of Aretal.
1927	Mr. Fortune's Maggot	Sylvia Townsend Warner	US	Tells the story of the infatuation of a middle-aged missionary Reverend Timothy Fortune for a young Polynesian male, Lueli, in St. Fabien in a remote island of Fanua, on the Raritongan Archipelago in the Pacific. The boy -renamed Theodore- with the approval of his mother, moves with Mr. Fortune an introduces him to island life and customs.
1927	Vefarinn mikli frá Kasmír	Halldór Laxness	Iceland	[The Great Weaver from Kashmir] Follows the story of Steinn Elliði, an unstable young man who travels around Europe in search of his place in the world and who, in several passages, recounts his sexual experiences.
1927	Chocolate: And Other Writings On Male Homoeroticism	"Ugra" (Pandey Bechan Sharma)	India	[Chocolate: And Other Writings On Male Homoeroticism] Choklat was a sensation, eliciting polarized responses upon publication. Encouraged by the scandal he provoked, Ugra proceeded to publish a further four stories on the same theme over the next few months, and gathered them together in October 1927 with three more stories: Hey Sukumar (O Beautiful Young Man!), Vyabhichari Pyar (Dissolute Love), and Jail Mein (In Prison). The collection appeared translated into English by Ruth Vanita in 2006, under the name Chocolate: And Other Writings on Male-male Desire.
1927	A Tale of Pausanian Love	"Arthur Lyon Raile" (Edward Perry Warren)	UK	In an elite Oxford college at the end of the 19th century, a young student recounts his friendship with Alfred Byngham, a brilliant, reserved, and highly sensitive classmate. The plot intertwines university life—conversations, friendships, exams, summers in the countryside—with the reflections that inspired Plato's Symposium and, above all, the model of love between men that Pausanias defends in that work.
1928	The White Paper	Anonymous (Jean Cocteau)	France	A gay narrator recalls the course of his life, including his sexual awakening and attempts to come to terms with his sexuality. Some scholars have read it as autobiographical (Cocteau was gay). Rictor Norton interprets it as a sociological treatise on the injustice of homophobia.
1928	El ángel de Sodoma	Alfonso Hernández-Catá	Spain	[The Angel from Sodom] The first "official" gay novel published in Spain. It was prefaced by endocrinologist Dr. Gregorio Marañón.
1928	To Kiss the Crocodile: A Story	Ernest Milton	UK	In it one protagonist -of two- fled the languor of British “invert” society, escaping to exotic regions and sacrificial death.
1928	Krypteia	Naomi Mitchison	UK	One of the short stories included in the collection entitled Black Sparta: Greek Stories. The Spartan Geranor kills a rebellious goatherd and takes his son prisoner, whom he takes to the Spartan camp. His beloved Charilas asks Geranor in vain not to sacrifice the young man's life; His pleas are ignored and the prisoner is killed after being interrogated. Charilas, watering the Spartan land with tears, claims to be unable to continue loving a man who could have done such a thing.
1928	O Lucky Thessaly!	Naomi Mitchison	UK	One of the short stories included in the collection entitled Black Sparta: Greek Stories. The young poet Pindar arrives in Thessaly invited by the Grand Duke Thorax to compose an ode in honor of Hippokleas, who has won the race at Delphi. The poet and the boy fall in love, Hippokleas in such a way that he stops entertaining his friends. Once the poem is finished and already rehearsed by the choir, Pindar proposes to the young man, but his intellectual distance interferes with the pleasure of making love. After the poem has been triumphantly recited at a great party, Pindar decides to leave Thessaly, feeling that he must leave so that the muses may inspire him through another love. Once alone, Hippokleas, heartbroken and upset, returns to the company of his friends.
1928	Adonis-Bar	Maurice Duplay	France	Inspired by the Montmartre transvestite cabaret La Petite Chaumière, Duplay tells an unusual sentimental story set in a Montmartre gay bar that accurately reflects the decadence of the 1920s. Through the eyes of the owner of the Bar Adonis, Horace, we learn about his beginnings as the lover of the great actor Farnèse, then his career as an actor – mediocre and unsuccessful – his subsequent decision to open a bar with the help of some transvestite friends, his conversion into a meeting point thanks to his former lover Farnèse, the poet Jonquille and the Prince of the Canary Islands (based on Infante Luis Fernando of Spain); and his meeting Fred, a young tie salesman whom he makes his lover and companion.
1929	Au Poiss' D'Or, Hôtel Meublé	Alec Scouffi	France	[The Pension of the Golden Fish] In the Roaring Twenties, Pierre, a cute and innocent blond boy, runs away from home ready to discover the world. He arrives to Paris, where he easily integrates into a group of urchins and petty criminals, among whom he discovers his sexuality and the attraction that his body exerts on certain men, which he decides to exploit.
1929	Singermann	Myron Brinig	US	Tells the story of Moses Singermann, his wife Rebecca, and their six children. It is a story of what the new American freedom does to the family's traditional Jewish values. It is here we first meet Harry and Michael, the two gay Singermann brothers.
1929	American Colony	Charles Brackett	US	Novel of the high jinks and romances among the American expatriates living on the French Riviera. One of the characters, Sydney, is a gay man living among upper-crust straight friends. The book is dedicated to the American homosexual drama critic and commentator Alexander Woollcott.
1929	The Lives and Deaths of Roland Greer	Richard Lionel Pyke	US	Is the story of a boy who is dominated all his life by two outside forces, Male and Female, the conscious and un conscious influences at work in the lives of Roland Greer are uncompromisingly set forth.
1929	Alf	Bruno Vogel	Germany	Felix and Alf, high school students in Wilhelmine Germany, discover their sexuality and experience love; but Felix finally submits to the commandments of church, school and state. Disappointed, Alf volunteers for the war: a heroic death instead of love and happiness.
1929	Alexis ou le Traité du vain combat	"Marguerite Yourcenar" (Marguerite Cleenewerck de Crayencour)	France	[Alexis; or, The Treatise of Vain Combat] Set in Austria, on the eve of the First World War. In a long letter, Alexis, a twenty-two-year-old musician, describes to his wife Monique the "vain fight" he has been waging for years against the nature of his deepest desires and which leads him to break up: the love of men, which is suggested between the lines of the narrative.
1929*	The Temple	Stephen Spender	UK	Is a semi-autobiographical novel, sometimes labelled a bildungsroman because of its explorations of youth and first love. Due to its frank depictions of homosexuality, was published until 1988.
1929	Serenata del amor triunfante	Pedro Badanelli	Spain	[Triumphant Love Serenade] It is about a triangular rivalry that ends badly between a brother, a sister and a man desired by both. The novel ends in a delirium of passion and death. Badanelli also makes an ethical and aesthetic defense of homosexuality, with arguments that evoke those used by André Gide, Alberto Nin Frías and E.M. Forster. As a result of its publication, its author, a priest, was exiled in Argentina.
1929	A Matter of No Importance	Naomi Mitchison	UK	One of the short stories included in the collection entitled Barbarian Stories. The tribune Marcus Trebius returns to Rome after having fought in Britain accompanied by Rudd, a young slave with whom he has come to fall in love. But Decima, Marcus's rich heiress and whom he wishes to marry due to his political ambitions, demands the slave as a gift. The tearful Rudd is handed over to Decima not without pain, later, during another absence of Marcus now sent to Gaul, his fiancée trades Rudd for a brooch. When the tribune returns to Rome, the slave has been sold to a foreigner and taken with him. The marriage is celebrated, but despite this, Marcus does not become consul.
1929	Alexander, Roman der Utopie	Klaus Mann	Germany	[Alexander, Novel of Utopia] Describes the life and death of Alexander III of Macedon has an obsessive man who, carried away by the exuberance of his ideas, already feels the defeats in his victories, becomes guilty of his friends and increasingly succumbs to loneliness. Klaus Mann's first novel was one of the first novels in Germany to deal with homosexuality openly (apparently the first novel to deal with Alexander's homosexuality), and "inspired" his father, Thomas Mann, to write an essay in which he condemned homoeroticism.
1929	Fredi a l'école. Le roman d'un inverti	"Max des Vignons"	France	[Freddy at School: the Story of a Homosexual] One of a series of homoerotic “Fredi” novels. This title about Fredi's schoolboy days and the emergence of his sexual inclinations, which manifest themselves as timidity. Complete with a preface that presents the subject matter as a guide to parents and educators who “too often, due to ignorance... fail to recognize, in childhood, the first symptoms of inversion...”. It was printed in Paris by the Librairie Artistique, with illustrations by Gaston Smit.

=== 1930s ===
Year	Title	Author	Country	Notes
1930	Manji	Jun'ichirō Tanizaki	Japan	[Quicksand] In fact, Manji means Swastika. It was written in serial format between 1928 and 1930. It concerns a four-way bisexual love affair between upper-crust denizens of Osaka.
1930	Asakusa Kurenaidan	Yasunari Kawabata	Japan	[The Scarlet Gang of Asakusa] The novel describes the decadent allure of this entertainment district, where beggars and teenage prostitutes mingle with revue dancers and famous authors.
1930	Kotō no Oni	"Edogawa Ranpo" (Tarō Hirai)	Japan	[The Demon of the Lonely Isle] Moroto and Minoura have known each other since they were students, Minoura admired Moroto -who is six years older than him- as a respectable student. Moroto is homosexual and is in love with Minoura, who is not homosexual, but his self-esteem increased a bit by having such feelings directed at the object of his respect.
1930	Anthony in the Nude	Myron Brinig	US	Tells the story of a successful love affair between narcissists.
1930	Other Man's Saucer	John Keith Winter	UK	The novel follows Shaw Latimer, a schoolteacher in Oxford who writes his first novel.
1930	Fredi s'amuse	"Max des Vignons"	France	[Freddy has fun] Fredi is out of school; he is a student, he lives free. Women seek him, but he comes out of their hands absolutely disenchanted and returns to his real satisfaction. Each volume is illustrated by “master” Smit. The novels are a masculine mirror of Colette/Willy’s successful Claudine series.
1930	Fredi en ménage	"Max des Vignons"	France	[Freddy in housekeeping] The third and last in the series of transvestite novels starring Fredi. In this last volume, the full flowering of the investment takes place. Fredi dreams of creating a home for himself, of having a home, but -of course- outside of natural law. He plays the housekeeper to an older man, but he seems to spend most of his time in a silk kimono and high-heeled shoes.
1931	Strange Brother	Blair Niles	US	The story is about a platonic relationship between a heterosexual woman and a gay man and takes place in New York City in the late 1920s and early 1930s. The novel provides an early and objective documentation of homosexual issues during the Harlem Renaissance.
1931	The Opening of a Door	George Davis	US	The story is of a large family in downtown Chicago in the 1920s and what happens to them when the Grandfather dies. Homosexuality is never mentioned or depicted outright, but there are so many subtle hints; from Uncle Daniel who lives in San Francisco and collects the first editions of Gide, through Uncle Lincoln who seems to have a dark secret that his wife knows about and often get his drunken rages about their marriage, to young Edward who needs to break away from his current drab life and become the gay writer.
1931	Hommes du Crépuscule	André Tellier	France	[Twilight Men: The Story of a Homosexual] The novel follows Armand (the illegitimate son of the Comte Edmond de Rasbon) through the twilight world of Paris and New York, through the pain of his first awareness of his own sexual longings, his gay tendencies who infuriates his father, who attempts to set him upon the "path of normality" by hiring a mistress to seduce him, his unavailing romance with Marianne, and into his own, queer world of jealousies and courtship, gaiety and sadness.
1931	Highland Fling	Nancy Mitford	UK	Mitford was inspired by Hamish Erskine for the male lead in her first novel.
1931	Le Supplice d'une queue	Anonymous (François-Paul Alibert)	France	[The Torture of a Tail] This short novel, published by the renowned erotic fiction editor René Bonnel, was initially released anonymously and clandestinely in 1931, but a 1945 edition included Alibert's name. It tells the story of the solitude of desire, but also a joyful tale of homosexual love in a grand and fulfilling sexuality. It recounts the erotic and amorous story of Albert and Armand, the latter—who suffers from a disproportionately large and hypertrophied penis—telling his story one night while frolicking on the sand in his lover's arms.
1932	The Memorial	Christopher Isherwood	UK	
1932	Por los caminos de Sodoma: confesiones íntimas de un homosexual	"Sir. Edgar Dixon" ( Bernardo Arias Trujillo)	Colombia	[On the Roads of Sodom: Intimate Confessions of a Homosexual] It tells the story of David, a teenager from a provincial city, who, faced with the oppressive environment of his home, decides to flee. Looking for the love of another boy with whom to share his life, after several failed experiences, he falls madly in love with a beautiful circus trapeze artist. But his past will end up leading him to perdition.
1932	This Man Is My Brother	Myron Brinig	US	The sequel to Singermann (1929) in which Brinig continues the story of the two gay brothers, Harry and Michael Singermann.
1932	Männer zu verkaufen	Friedrich Radszuweit	Germany	[Men for Sale] Berlin 1930: Baron von Rotberg is being blackmailed and faces ruin. Erich Lammers, the tutor, wants to help and has to realize that the blackmailer is his own brother.
1932*	Hindoo Holiday	Joe Randolph Ackerley	UK	Comic memory of the author, it is a gay satire on autocracy, it is set in the city of Chhokrapur ("City of Boys"). Is written in the form of (and based on) a journal which Ackerley kept during his five-month engagement as secretary to Vishwanath Singh, Maharajah of Chhatarpur between December 1923 and May 1924. The book was published until the death of the Maharaja.
1933	Better Angel	"Richard Meeker" (Forman Brown)	US	The novel describes the love affair between Kurt and another man Derry, and their relationship with a third man, Tony. Reprinted as a pulp paperback in 1951 under the title Torment.
1933	The Young and Evil	Charles Henri Ford and Parker Tyler	France	Set in the underground homosexual community in New York City and using stream of consciousness narration. Ford, an American, was unable to find a publisher in the US or UK, and the book was barred from being shipped there.
1933	Am Rande der Nacht	Friedo Lampe	Germany	[At the Edge of Night] The book was seized by the Nazis, withdrawn from sale, and included on their ‘list of damaging and undesirable writings’. This was due to the homoerotic content of the novel, and its depiction of an interracial relationship between a German woman and a black man.
1933	A Sodoma en tren de botijo	Álvaro Retana	Spain	[To Sodome in the Tourist Train] A camp novel, where handsome, and naive Nemesio Fuentepino from Almería is taken advantage by a group of big city queens, where he will discover the depraved world of the fiestas of the perverse Marquis de Pijo Infante, attended by aristocrats fond of cross-dressing, cocottes and the most carefree illustrious fagots of the city.
1933	Forest Fire	Rex Stout	US	The novel is laid in the wild forest reserves of Montana; it is peopled by robust he-men; it is laid waste by a conflagration of major dimensions. Stan Durham is a senior fire ranger who protects his territory from forest fires along with his blond, blue-eyed nineteen-year-old summer recruit, Henry Fallon.
1933	Gentlemen, I Address You Privately	Kay Boyle	US	An English priest, Munday, defrocked for playing Poeme de l'Exstase by Scriabin during collection, who exiles himself to Normandy's wild countryside. Here he befriends the Cockney sailor, Ayton, a vagabond as shifty as the winds who was wanted for theft, deserted his ship, and went into hiding. Munday and Ayton become involved in an erotic relationship, causing Munday to question his whole identity.
1933	Serafim Ponte Grande	José Oswald de Souza Andrade	Brazil	[Seraph Ponte Grande] The protagonist is a womanizer who at times experiences homoerotic desires, which the novel treats in a comical way and which he sees as an illness. The work also shows a lesbian couple, one of whom Seraph seduces, with the idea that not even a lesbian woman could resist her charms.
1933	Ces Messieurs du Sens Interdit	"Marilli de Saint-Yves" (Marie-Louise Fouquet)	France	[These Gentleman of Forbidden Meaning] In this Roman à clef, the author tells us about, among other places, La Select, a place frequented by androgynous people with the appearance of artists, and the Cosy-Bar, a place of “Corydones” and young men who seek each other out, love each other and hate each other. With her sharp eye, she caricatures this universe but also gives a warm and endearing view of love above prejudices and chains.
1933*	Le Fils de Loth	François-Paul Alibert	France	[The Son of Lot] Written in the 1930s, the unpublished manuscript was published only in 2002, with a preface by Didier Eribon. The novel narrates the amorous encounter of two handsome teenagers, André and Roland, the former confessing that he was initiated into love by his father. Alibert revisits and distorts the biblical legend of Lot, who, in the absence of his wife (turned into a pillar of salt) and in the absence of other female creatures, he would have abused his own daughters.
1933	Sangre ranchera	Luis Benedicto	México	[Country Blood; or, Rancher Blood] Don Valentín, a stubborn, macho, and tenacious rancher, is the wealthiest man in a town in the Huasteca village and the father of three children who are his complete opposites: Ignacio, the eldest, is lazy and a partygoer; Teresa rejects domestic life for romance and flirtation; and Salvador is a boy with a feminine air and a passion for learning. The town's schoolteacher, an exemplary woman with whom the widowed Don Valentín is in love, acts as a mediator between him and his children. This is the first volume of the trilogy En la paz porfiriana (In the Pax Porfiriana), and the only one that survives, since, due to the writer's reclusive nature, it is unknown whether En la corte del dictador (In the Dictator's Court) and Tierras fecundas (Fertile Lands) were ever written. It is known that the author planned to make Salvador the protagonist of the rest of the story.
1934	Bachelor's Hall	"Reginald Underwood"	UK	The novel tells the story of Adrian, a humble boy who dreams of a pure and immaculate relationship with another boy who is willing to be his life partner, his alter ego, and with whom he can put an end to his loneliness.
1934	Duque (novel)	José Diez Canseco Pereyra	Peru	[Duke] Teddy Crownchield Soto Menor is a young dandy heir to a great fortune who, after having lived for more than ten years in Europe, seeks to fit into a Lima society that he no longer recognizes. Everything seemed to be going well until he becomes the lover of an older man.
1934	The Murder of My Aunt	"Richard Hull" (Richard Henry Sampson)	UK	Edward Powell lives with his Aunt Mildred in the Welsh town of Llwll. His aunt thinks Llwll an idyllic place to live, but Edward loathes the countryside—and thinks the company even worse. In fact, Edward has decided to murder his aunt. The novel is considered a masterpiece of the inverted detective story, in which it is known "whodunit".
1934	Butterfly Man: A Strange Love Story	Lew Levenson	US	In Texas, Ken Gracey was a normal young man until his transformation into the flaming Butterfly Man, darling of the Third Sex, who rockets through riotous revels from Coast to Coast, is a tragic tale of the youth who never knew himself until too late.
1934	Aleko	Kenneth Albert Matthews	UK	Set in an elitist Greek male boarding school, located on an island off the coast of the Peloponnese, it tells the story of the relationship between a young English teacher, Martin Grahame, and one of his pupils, a 16-year-old troublemaker named Aleko, after what which his marriage and his reputation suffer the consequences.
1934	L’Amour défendu	Jacques de Gailleul	France	[Forbidden Love] The text introduces Paul de Baramont, who works as secretary to the actor Silvio Borelli, who later becomes his lover. The novel has characters based on real people whose names the author changed.
1934	Undue Fulfillment	Kathleen Coyle	US	Agatha, an overprotective mother with strong religious morals, discovers that her son Lawrence's relationship with Lena has ended. She travels to Paris in the hope of reuniting them and discovers his relationship with Cesar Brak, a poet of her generation. While the relationship is not labeled as gay or homosexual, it is clear from what is said (and what is not said) that the relationship is sexual.
1934*	La Couronne de pines	François-Paul Alibert	France	[The Crown of Pines] This is the lost sequel to Supplice d’une queue. The existence of La Couronne de pines was known since the 1982 publication of the correspondence between the poet Alibert and his friend André Gide. It remained untraceable until 2016, when a first set of proofs was sold at auction, followed by a second in 2022. Rediscovered, it was published in 2025.
1935	Los alucinados	"Augusto d'Halmar" (Augusto Jorge Goeminne Thomson)	Chile	[The Hazardous] Four stories make up this book and address homoerotic love in a very direct way. The work of this author is always more accurately described as pederastic because it focuses on the relationship between mature men and adolescent boys.
1935	Mr Norris Changes Trains	Christopher Isherwood	UK	During a train trip, the protagonist befriends Mr. Norris, a masochistic communist.
1935	Dwell in the Wilderness	Alvah Bessie	US	Its a multi-generational saga centering around a Michigan family, a mismatched husband and wife (he a gentle but ineffectual sort, she a religious zealot) and their four children, three boys and a girl. One boy becomes an alcoholic and another a money-worshipping status-seeker, but the more interesting pair are the sister (an aspiring actress) and the youngest brother (who's gay), who migrate to New York along with brother's lover, where they all cohabit and attempt to form a theatrical troupe.
1935	Pied Piper of Lovers	Lawrence Durrell	UK	The novel is in large part autobiographical and focuses on the Walsh Clifton -an Anglo-Indian born of an interracial couple- childhood in India and maturation in London. The protagonist has homosexual experiences, significant dream sequences, and comments on his wide readings.
1936	Shadows Flying	John Evans	US	Jacob, a sensitive and naive man in his twenties, develops a loving but non-sexual relationship with Runyon, a moody and self-centered fellow of his own age. After living together in San Francisco for three years, they visit Runyon's mother and sister at their ranch near Big Sur. Jacob becomes disturbed when Runyon's mother appears to display an unseemly interest in her son. The paperback edition (1955) retitled the book Love in the Shadows.
1936	The Last Enemy: A Study of Youth	Leonard Strong	UK	Tells the story of Denis Boyle, a young master in a public school who, because of unfitness during the war, finds himself a teacher, instead of completing his course at Oxford. Soon Denis is called up for re-examination for military service.
1936*	Cronache di poveri amanti	Vasco Pratolini	Italy	[Chronicle of Poor Lovers] Set in Florence, the choral novel describes on the one hand the life, loves and vicissitudes of a small community closely linked by living in the same street. The private stories of the characters, which intertwine with the dramatic events that marked the years 1925–1927 of the history of Italy. The novel was to be published in 1936 but, due to the political conditions that had changed in the interim, was published until 1947.
1936	Impassioned Pygmies	John Keith Winter	UK	E. L. Marius, a literary figure of his age, just taken up residence on the Mediterranean island of Miramar (based on Majorca), but the arrival of Saul, his arrogant eldest son, accompanied by Simon and Lily, an English squire and his American wife, and by Andrew Jordan, a young dramatist, breaks violently into the life of the island. Winter and playwright Noël Coward were briefly lovers, and the model responsible for Andrew Jordan's character. For his part, E. L. Marius is based on D. H. Lawrence.
1936	Los niños en el bosque	Juan Carlos Onetti	Uruguay	[Children in the Forest] A teenager named Raucho defends another named Coco in a fight, and then warns him about a character known as Rubio whom he describes as a "faggot" and "a piece of trash." Despite the hostility with which Raucho refers to the homosexual character, he is clear with Coco when establishing that those who had relations with Rubio were not homosexuals, but only him. The text presents a traditional vision of sexual orientation based on Latin conceptions, in which only the passive man is considered homosexual.
1936	Adam Grywałd	Tadeusz Breza	Poland	The work describes the environment of the wealthy interwar bourgeoisie in Warsaw. The axis of the action is the beginning of a homoerotic romance between the title character and Edmund Mosse. This romance is a kind of compensation for the hero for his unrequited love for Iza, Edmund's sister. The action of the novel and the psyche of the title character are presented from the perspective of a first-person narrator, reconstructing events from gossip, confessions and assumptions. The work was seen as an anti-bourgeois satire, a novel about love, or an image of a lost generation.
1936*	The Girls of Radcliff Hall	"Adela Quebec" (Gerald Hugh Tyrwhitt-Wilson, 14th Baron Berners)	UK	Written between 1932 and 1936, it’s a roman à clef in the form of a school story in which the author portrays himself and his circle of friends, including Cecil Beaton, Peter Watson, Pavel Tchelitchew, David Herbert, and Oliver Messel, among others, as lesbian girls. The incidents depicted are based on various intrigues at Berners's home in Faringdon, here represented a school named "Radcliff Hall" (a reference to the famous lesbian writer). The indiscretions alluded to in the novel caused a stir among Berners's close friends and acquaintances. The original edition is said to have been destroyed by one or more of those portrayed.
1936	A grande atração	"R. Magalhães Jr." ( Raimundo Magalhães Júnior)	Brazil	[The Star Attraction] One of the short stories included in the collection entitled Fuga e outros contos. Ramón Betanzo, a gambling-addicted dog trainer at a circus, is the narrator and witness, seemingly expressing a disapproving view of the cross-dressing of Luigi Bianchi, the protagonist, who studied opera in Milan and dreamed of becoming a soprano in a famous company. But since the best roles were for women, he preferred to live as a transvestite and sing in the ring of the decadent Circus Politeama in small towns. It is the first Brazilian narrative with a cross-dresser as the protagonist.
1937	Kuilu	"Martti Larni" (Martti Laine)	Finland	[The Gap] Tells the story of journalist and writer Unto Kamara, who is in a homosexual relationship with a literary scholar named Dr. H. When the Finnish Civil War begins, they fight each other.
1937	He Swung and He Missed	Eugene O'Brien	US	The story follows Toby Brent, through his four years in the navy, after he enlisted with the hopes of continuing his studies at the Naval Academy. Brent is assaulted by a character who up until that moment, has been seen as a friend. It is in his desperation to get away from this once “friend” that Brent finds himself on an ever-increasing path towards a destruction of self.
1937	Dečki: roman iz dijaškega internata	France Novšak	Slovenia	[Boys: A Novel from a Boarding School] Zdenko Castelli from Serbia and Nani Papali from Slovenia, meet at St. Mary's Institute, a Catholic boarding school in Zagreb, Croatia, where Zdenko is the subject of great admiration, with students as well as educators generally regarding him as the most beautiful boy. Despite the differences in their backgrounds, the boys’ relationship becomes very intimate very quickly. It was the first gay-themed novel in Slovene.
1937	The Young Desire It	"Seaforth Mackenzie" (Kenneth Ivo Brownley Langwell Mackenzie)	Australia	Mr. Penworth, a teacher recently arrived from Oxford, falls madly in love with young Charles and tries to seduce him. It is a significant novel for the way it reveals the differences between sex and gender.
1937	Billy: Idylles d'’amour grec en Angleterre	"Jean d’Essac" (Jean Casse)	France	[Billy: Greek Love Idylls in England] An autobiographical account of the author's homosexual activities while he was a military cadet in England, illustrated by himself. Jean, a mature and experienced painter who lives in London, meets and seduces -in a bar frequented by civilians looking to meet men of the Royal Guard- Billy, a handsome young soldier of 20 years old, shy and insecure, with whom he begins a love affair.
1937*	Vereda del norte	"José U. Escobar" (José Urbano de Jesús Escobar Ruiz)	Mexico	[Northern Path] The story is set during the Revolution, in the fictional San Francisquito del Oro, Parral, and is constructed from the perspective of an omniscient third-person narrator who addresses the homosexual awakening of 14-year-old miner Ricardo García and his romance with the young peasant Teófilo Domínguez. The story remained unpublished until its publication -although in several installments- in the Suplemento Cultural Armario of the Semanario magazine in 2004, and the following year in book format.
1938	Serenade	James Mallahan Cain	US	Loosely based on Bizet's Carmen, the story explores the sources of artistic development, in particular the role played by sexual orientation in the development of artistic talent.
1938	Hombres sin mujer	Carlos Montenegro	Cuba	[Men without Women] The novel recounts the sentimental and sexual drama of some prisoners. The black Pascasio Speek describes how his world begins to fall apart when he meets a recently arrived prisoner, a teenager named Andrés. The young man ignites a flame in him that until then he was unaware of and makes him forget the miserable reality in which he lives.
1938	Concert Pitch	Elliot Paul	US	Set in Paris, some years after the War, the novel presents a critic, Ernest Hallowell; a handsome young pianist, Robert Maura; his beautiful mother Elizabeth Maura; a gay impresario, Lucien Piot; and his protegé, the poet Raoul Evrard.
1938	Spacer	"Sydor Rey" (Izydor Reiss)	Poland	[A Walk] This story illustrated the extent of Polish anti-Semitism in a homoerotic context. Two men with a homosexual sexual orientation, one of whom is Jewish and the other Polish, are taking a walk in a public park. The gentlemen openly display affection for each other, but this is not the reason for the outrage of those around them. Passersby are shocked by the fact that they are men of two different nationalities, the Poles outraged that one of the men is Jewish and the Jews outraged that one of them is hanging out with a Pole.
1939	Goodbye to Berlin	Christopher Isherwood	UK	The narrator, having moved to the Weimar Republic for work, meets a group of people who will be most at risk of intimidation, assault, and persecution by followers of Adolf Hitler: artists, free women, Jews, and homosexuals.
1939	Purposes of Love	"Mary Renault" (Eileen Mary Challans)	UK	Vivian Lingard, a 27-year-old nurse in a suffocating and soul sucking position at a hospital falls in love with Mic, a handsome, 25-year-old pathologist who she meets through her brother, Jan, and who also happens to be his ex-lover. At the same time, a nurse named Colonna Kimball is in love with Vivian.
1939	The Big Sleep	Raymond Chandler	US	Is a hardboiled crime novel, the first to feature the detective Philip Marlowe. The story is noted for its complexity, with characters double-crossing one another and secrets being exposed throughout the narrative.
1939	Le Coup de grâce	"Marguerite Yourcenar" (Marguerite Cleenewerck de Crayencour)	France	[Coup de Grace] Erick von Lhomond, recently wounded during the Spanish Civil War, returning to Germany via Italy. Among other mercenaries, he begins to tell his war story, which dates back to the Bolshevik Revolution. He joins to German forces fighting the Bolsheviks in Kurland There he meets his childhood friend, Conrad, who will fight alongside him and Conrad's sister, Sophie, helps take care of all the soldiers. Erick easily reconnects with Conrad but he did not expect Sophie's more mature attentions, rejecting her advances because of his feelings for Conrad.

=== 1940s ===
Year	Title	Author	Country	Notes
1940	Die Geschichte des Hitlerjungen Adolf Goers	“Pfarrer Silesius” (Hans Siemsen)	UK	[The Story of the Hitler Youth Adolf Goers] Written in exile, the novel is an "anti-fascist pamphlet". Siemsen's novel is pervaded by the assumption that the Hitlerjugend was a hotbed of homosexuality, in fact, it became subliminal denounced National Socialism was a homosexual movement. That's why Siemsen, who was homosexual himself, was sometimes accused of 'gay self-hatred'. Printed in London in 1940, it was printed in Germany until 1947.
1941	Reflections in a Golden Eye	Carson McCullers	US	Capt. Penderton is a closeted homosexual who realizes that he is physically attracted to Pvt. Williams, but remains unaware of the private's attraction to his wife Leonora.
1941*	The Mysteries of Joy Rio	"Tennessee Williams" (Thomas Lanier Williams III)	US	One of the short stories included in the collection entitled Hard Candy: A Book of Stories. Pablo González inherits the watch shop of his mentor and lover Emiel Kroger, and goes to the old theatre where he met him and where other men went to meet each other. Written in 1941, it was not published until 1954.
1942	Zwei Welten: Eine Jugend im nationalsozialistischen Deutschland	"Frank Clare" (Frederick William Clayton)	Germany	[Two Worlds: A Youth in Nazi Germany] The novel describes the political and social situation in Nazi Germany in the late 1930s from the perspective of the Englishman David Beaton, who worked as an English teacher at a German school for a while. A friendly relationship develops between Beaton and the 16-year-old student Götz, which also includes intellectual disputes.
1942	The Sailor-Boy’s Tale	"Isak Dinesen" (Karen Blixen)	Denmark	One of the short stories included in the collection entitled Winter’s Tales. Is a coming-of-age story, told in the style of a fairy tale, in which a young man, Simon, must go through a rite of passage to make the transition from boyhood to manhood. As Simon is a sailor, he comes from a strongly homosocial environment, as there are no women in the ships’ crews. Even when they go ashore for recreation, the sailors in the story seem to be primarily interested in interacting with one another rather than seeking out the company of women.
1942	Lihaaf	Ismat Chughtai	India	[The Quilt] Short story published in the Urdu literary journal Adab-i-Latif. After discovering her husband's homosexuality, a woman explores her own sexuality.
1943	Notre-Dame-des-Fleurs	Jean Genet	France	[Our Lady of the Flowers] The novel is a largely autobiographical account of a man's journey through the Parisian underworld. The characters are drawn after their real-life counterparts, who are mostly homosexuals living on the fringes of society.
1943	Agostino	"Alberto Moravia" (Alberto Pincherle)	Italy	[Augustine] The story centers on the painful discovery of sex by a thirteen-year-old boy, between his mother (a beautiful young widow, whom he reveres), a group of local youth from a Tuscan seaside resort, and Saro, a man who owns a boat who maintains a homosexual relationship with Homs, a young black man who belongs to the group.
1943	Maiden Voyage	Denton Welch	UK	Although autobiographical, it tells the author's adventures in a fantastic way, probably embellished or imagined. At 16, Denton runs away rather than return to Repton's school. He embarks on a journey to Shanghai to meet his father.
1943	Il quartiere	Vasco Pratolini	Italy	[The District] Published in the United States as The Naked Streets and in the United Kingdom as A Tale of Santa Croce. Set in one of the most popular neighborhoods of Florence around 1935, the novel captures a group of boys and girls in the transition from adolescence to early youth. Everything is told through the eyes of Valerio, fifteen years old, a projection of the author himself.
1944	Les amitiés particulières	Roger Peyrefitte	France	[Special Friendships] Largely autobiographical, it deals with an intimate relationship between two boys at a Roman Catholic boarding school and how it is destroyed by a priest's will to protect them from homosexuality.
1944	The Lost Weekend	Charles Reginald Jackson	US	This story of a talented but alcoholic writer was praised for its powerful realism, closely reflecting the author's own experience of alcoholism, from which he was temporarily cured.
1945	Brideshead Revisited	Evelyn Waugh	UK	One of Waugh's most nostalgic and iconic novels, adapted for TV in 1981 and remade for cinema in 2008, Brideshead Revisited follows the story of captain Charles Ryder who, after returning to Brideshead, starts recalling his life since 1920s Oxford, full of drama and tragedies (his romantic friendship with a young aristocrat being the center of it all), until the start of the war.
1945	The Brick Foxhole	"Richard Brooks" (Reuben Sax)	US	Set in the U.S. during the final months of WWII, this story of murder reflects the racism, anti-Semitism, and homophobia of the times. The main characters are a group of soldiers coping with the frustration, boredom, and disgrace of serving stateside while other men are over in Europe and the Pacific, killing the enemy.
1945	The Folded Leaf	William Keepers Maxwell Jr.	US	In the suburbs of Chicago in the 1920s, two boys initiate an unusual friendship: Lymie Peters, a skinny and somewhat clumsy boy who always gets good grades, and newcomer Spud Latham, a star athlete and mediocre student. Spud accepts Lymie's devotion without questioning it, but once high school ends and the boys enter college, tensions begin to arise between them.
1945*	And the Hippos Were Boiled in Their Tanks	Jack Kerouac and William S. Burroughs	US	The book consists of alternating chapters by each author writing as a different character. The novel is a Roman à clef based upon the killing of David Kammerer who was obsessed with Lucien Carr. The text remained unpublished in complete form until 2008.
1946	The Fall of Valor	Charles Reginald Jackson	US	Tells the story of John Grandin, a middle-aged man meeting his wife, Ethel, for a summer vacation on Nantucket. There, they meet a young Marine captain on medical leave with his newlywed wife. John finds himself drawn to the Marine for reasons he can't quite articulate.
1946	The Dazzling Crystal	Janet Schane	US	The commercial artist Judith Forrester marries the novelist Nicky Hoffmann, after this she try to understand why her husband's dislike him. Later she meets Nicky first publisher, Mark Sauter, and she realizes that the two men had once been lovers.
1946	Miracle de la rose	Jean Genet	France	[Miracle of the Rose] Is a non-linear structure semi-autobiographical novel that describes homosexual erotic desires for his fellow adolescent detainees in Mettray Penal Colony and Fontevrault prison.
1946	Eftir örstuttan leik	Elías Mar	Iceland	[After a Very Short Game] Tells the first-person story of Þórhall, a twenty student known as Bubba who lives in Reykjavík and who suffers an existential crisis for not being able to adapt to the social expectations of him. The work does not include direct references to homosexuality, but the internal conflicts of the protagonist and his chaotic relationships with women indicate a repressed homosexual desire.
1947	Querelle de Brest	Anonymous (Jean Genet)	France	[Querelle of Brest] The story of a bisexual thief, prostitute and serial killer in Brest. Only 460 copies initially printed. An English translation was published in 1974. It was adapted to film in 1982 by Rainer Werner Fassbinder.
1947	The Strumpet Wind	Gordon Merrick	US	The somewhat autobiographical novel is about a gay American spy in France during World War II. Homosexual themes are minimized in the novel, which explores concepts of individual liberty and freedom. The spy's director is a dazzlingly handsome, but sadistic, bisexual.
1947	The Great Light	Larry Barretto	US	Dirck Ericson, after kill an innocent man, he with his friend Archer Paine -who later becomes a novelist- enlists as an ambulance corpsman at America's entry into World War I, there meets a gay man called Roswell Cleminshaw.
1947	The End of My Life	Vance Bourjaily	US	Inspired story by Vance Bourjaily's experiences as an ambulance driver in the American Field Service during the World War II.
1947	The Gallery	John Horne Burns	US	Set in occupied Naples in 1944, the novel takes its name from the Galleria Umberto I, a bombed-out arcade where everybody in town comes together in pursuit of food, drink, sex, money, and oblivion. A daring novel and one of the first to look directly at gay life in the military.
1947	The Sling and the Arrow Light	Stuart Engstrand	US	Tells the story about a married man named Herbert Dawes, a "latent homosexual" who throughout much of the book he attempts to: kill his wife Lonna, gets involved with a prostitute, turns into a "peeping Tom", has fantasies about being a woman and seems to be suffering with a serious mental illness.
1947	Finistère	Fritz Peters	US	[Finisterre] After his parents' divorce, Matthew Cameron moved to Paris with his mother, where he was enrolled at the St. Croix École des Garçons boarding school, where he began a series of relationships. His innocent and idealized first love can't insulate him from the cruelty of the world or of the adults in his life.
1947	Knock on Any Door	Willard Motley	US	A work of gritty naturalism, it concerns the life of Nick Romano, an Italian-American altar boy who turns to crime because of poverty and the difficulties of the immigrant experience. Motley researched his novel on the streets of his native Chicago, talking to immigrants about their experiences and visiting juveniles in Illinois's youth detention centers.
1947	End As a Man	Calder Willingham	US	The novel an indictment of the macho culture of military academies, introducing his first iconic character, sadistic Jocko de Paris. The story include graphic hazing, sex, and suggested homosexuality.
1947	Frederico Paciência	Mário de Andrade	Brazil	One of the short stories included in the collection entitled Contos novos. A man named Juca remembers his classmate Frederico, who during school was united by an intense friendship and affection that caused the rest of his classmates to begin to verbally attack them and accuse them of being homosexual. Although neither of them accepts that what they feel is more than friendship. Although the characters do not accept their sexual orientation, the text is remembered as one of the first in which a homoaffective relationship is not narrated in a negative way and that focuses on the affection between the characters.
1947	Jours sans dimanche	Guy de Hautefeuille	France	[Days without Sunday] The short novel recounts the sexual adventures of Jacques, a young man well endowed by nature, who leaves his rural home to work with his aunt in Paris. His aunt takes him firmly in hand, and during the course of the narrative he learns all the ways in which sex can be experienced. Jours sans dimanche stands alone by virtue of being the only quality narrative of the period to include both heterosexual and male and female same-sex scenes – something for all tastes. Was published Au Mont de Vénus and illustrated by Anatola Soungouroff.
1948	The City and the Pillar	Gore Vidal	US	The story is about a young man who is coming of age and discovers his own homosexuality. Is recognized as the first post-World War II novel whose gay protagonist is portrayed in a sympathetic manner and is not killed off at the end of the story for defying social norms.
1948	Other Voices, Other Rooms	"Truman Capote" (Truman Streckfus Persons)	US	After his mother's death, 13-year-old Joel Harrison Knox, a lonely, effeminate boy, is sent from New Orleans to live with his father, who abandoned him at birth. There he meets his sullen stepmother Amy; her cousin Randolph, a gay man and dandy; the defiant tomboy Idabel; and Jesus and Zoo, the two black caretakers of the home.
1948	Pompes funèbres	Jean Genet	France	[Funeral Rites] The story tells a story of love and betrayal outside and above any political division; the protagonist tells in memory and in honor of his homosexual lover, Jean Decarnin, assassinated by the Germans during World War II.
1948	The Welcome	Hubert Creekmore	US	After moving to New York following Jim's wedding, Don returns home in Mississippi, routed by the Depression of the 1930s. He finds Jim stuck in an unhappy marriage, and Don's arrival intensifies Jim's misery. As Jim sinks into alcoholism, Don connects with a new love interest, and their mutual friends persistently try to unlock the secrets between Don and Jim.
1948*	Atti impuri	Pier Paolo Pasolini	Italy	[Impure Acts] It is the first of two of Pasolini's first unpublished stories. Largely autobiographical, the text tells of the author's difficulties with his own homosexuality. Originally written in 1948, were published until 1982.
1948*	Amado mio	Pier Paolo Pasolini	Italy	[My Beloved] It is the second of two of Pasolini's first unpublished stories. Largely autobiographical, the text tells of the author's difficulties with his own homosexuality. Originally written in 1948, were published until 1982.
1948	Desire and the Black Masseur	"Tennessee Williams" (Thomas Lanier Williams III)	US	One of the short stories included in the collection entitled One Arm and Other Stories. It narrates from a third-person omniscient point-of-view the sadomasochistic relationship that Anthony Burns, a 30-year-old white wholesale clerk, and an anonymous black masseur establish in a Turkish bath house.
1948	The Angel in the Alcove	"Tennessee Williams" (Thomas Lanier Williams III)	US	One of the short stories included in the collection entitled One Arm and Other Stories. An anonymous writer lives in a boarding house with a nosy, ill-tempered landlady and a dying neighbor who wants to perform fellatio on him before he dies.
1948	Ne sont pas morts tous les sadiques	"Ernst Ratno" (Max Roussel)	France	[Not All Sadists are Dead] In the ruins of a large bombed-out German city, 24-year-old Johan is dying of hunger and loneliness. He quickly becomes fond of a passing teenager, William, who takes him to his “forest”. There William runs a den with the help of his wife Edma, but soon, tired and above all disgusted, Johan – who had begun to prostitute himself – returns to the city. There, in the gay bar “Le Bilboquet”, he satisfies his thirst for blood among the night-time clientele and begins a career as a serial killer, a mad avenger whose mission is to massacre all the “sadists”, those demons who thrive among the condemned of the post-war period.
1949	Kamen no Kokuhaku	"Yukio Mishima" (Kimitake Hiraoka)	Japan	[Confessions of a Mask] The work, with important autobiographical elements, has as its main themes false appearances, the discovery of one's own homosexuality, and the Japanese national identity crisis after its defeat in World War II.
1949	Journal du voleur	Jean Genet	France	[The Thief's Journal] The novel is structured around a series of homosexual love affairs and male prostitution between the author/anti-hero and various criminals, con artists, pimps, and a detective.
1949	Stranger in the Land	"Ward Thomas" (Edward Thomas McNamara)	US	It narrates what happened to Raymond Manton, a young high school teacher, who jealously guards the secret of his homosexuality in the closed environment of a small and conservative American city during World War II.
1949	All Things Human	"Stuart Benton" (George Sylvester Viereck)	US	John Stuart Kent is a millionaire banker and aesthete, living out the Indian Summer of his life as the shape of his future is altered by five extraordinary women.
1949	The Christmas Tree	"Isabel Bolton" (Mary Britton Miller)	US	Bolton presents the members of a family who are scattered across the country. Each person's inner dialogue is unique but all conclude that this Christmas will be challenging, particularly if everyone shows up. The elderly Mrs. Danforth is celebrating the holidays with her grandson Henry, the boy's mother Anne, and new step-father Captain George Fletcher, when her homosexual son Larry, the boy's father, appears on the scene with his lover Jerry, and the story draws to its tragic conclusion. The novel suggest that families have always been difficult and tensions run high at that time of the year.
1949	The World Next Door	Fritz Peters	US	The novel is a fictionalized version of the author's own experiences and shows the horrors of psychiatric treatment during the 1940s and 1950s, including the use of wet sheet packs, insulin shock and electro-shock therapies.
1949	The Gay Year	Michael Jean De Forrest	US	The novel traces the journey, over one year, of Joe Harris as he moves from questioning his sexuality to becoming a gay kept boy with a promiscuous secret life to deciding he is heterosexual. Apparently the first time that 'gay' appeared in a title with a homosexual meaning.
1949	The Dark Peninsula	Ernest Frost	US	Is a novel in which homosexuality is not once mentioned by name, but one in which it is all-pervasive, both dangerous and desirous.
1949	The Divided Path	Nial Kent	US	The story follows Michael from his childhood, with his mother trying to make him a girl, his meeting with Paul and his torment for being unrequited, until his life in New York, and the participation in a coterie of young men who are also "gay".
1949	Man eg þig löngum	Elías Mar	Iceland	[I Remember You for a Long Time] Halldór, a young book lover who comes from a fishing village, travels to Reykjavík to study grammar, there he must face the internal shame he feels when he perceives himself differently and does not meet the expectations of his family and society. The novel displays many autobiographical features.

=== 1950s ===
Year	Title	Author	Country	Notes
1950	Quatrefoil: A Modern Novel	"James Barr" (James Fugaté)	US	Among the first novels to favourably portray homosexuality. Tells the story of a naval officer and banker named Phillip Froelich who is engaged to be married to a woman named Sybel Jo. While under investigation by court-martial by the Navy in 1946, he meets and is assisted by Tim Danelaw, a superior officer. An affair with Tim causes Phillip to confront his closeted homosexuality.
1950	The Dog Star	Donald Windham	US	Set in 1930s post-Depression Atlanta, tells the story of a young Southern man who is haunted by the suicide of his best friend from reform school.
1950	The Bitterweed Path	Thomas Hal Phillips	US	Depicts the struggles of two gay men in the Southern United States at the turn of the 20th century, and how an unconventional love triangle involving these two men, and one of their fathers, impacts their three marriages in small-town, Deep South.
1950	Footsteps on the Stairs	Myron Brinig	US	Jimmy Joyce, scion of a wealthy Butte Irish family who goes to San Francisco, where in a beautifully rendered scene of drunken desire has a one-night stand with a man he meets in a bar.
1950	The Night Air	Harrison Dowd	US	The novel described the difficulties its central character encounters in trying to come to terms with his sexuality. For years Andy Moore has resisted his tendency towards inversion and its, attendant evil, heavy drinking. But slowly, little by little, he succumbs to both.
1950	The Invisible Glass	"Loren Wahl" (Lawrence J. Madalena)	UK	Set against the backdrop of the Italian front at the end of World War II, in five intense days, the passions and prejudices that boil inside an African-American company of soldiers commanded by the racist Captain Randall and visited by an Italian-American lieutenant who falls in love with one of the soldiers. A doomed love story which breaks three taboos: love between men, love across the racial divide, and love between an officer and an enlisted man (Sergeant Washington and Corporal Carney).
1950	The Spanish Gardener	Archibald Joseph Cronin	UK	Tells the story of an American consul, Harrington Brande, who is posted to San Jorge on the Costa Brava, Spain with his young son Nicholas. The novel relates how Nicholas's innocent love for his father is destroyed by the latter's jealousy and vindictiveness when Nicholas forms a friendship with the young Spanish gardener, José Santero.
1950	The Image of a Drawn Sword	Jocelyn Brooke	UK	Reynard Langrish is an indecisive, submissive, bank teller who is charmed one evening by the appearance of a Captain Roy Archer, leader of an unnamed battalion. With Archer, Langrish is recruited into a secret cavalcade of men all of whom, curiously, sport the same tattoo. With vague pronouncements about “enlistment” and “the crisis,” Reynard fights against his desire to be closer to the men -in particular Roy- and his utter confusion as to what has been happening in and around him. Brooke develops themes such as paranoia and isolation.
1950	Elles se rend pas compte	"Vernon Sullivan" (Boris Vian)	France	[They Do Not Realize] Francis Deacon attends a fancy dress ball given by his childhood friend -and occasional lover- Gaya. He is shocked to learn that she is getting married, and even more shocked to meet her future husband, Richard Walcott, a homosexual drug dealer and member of the Walcott Gang. The novel addresses issues such as transvestism, lesbianism, homosexuality, corrective rape and asphyxiophilia.
1950	O Colecionador de Quinquilharias	Luiz Canabrava	Brazil	[The Trinket Collector] José is a young man who longs to flee Rio de Janeiro—then the capital of Brazil—at night to escape his family and his local obligations. The narrative then jumps to a time when he lives as a beggar, but free. In his first novel, Canabrava begins to explore a deconstruction of the male sexual figure.
1950	El tiras	José Mancisidor Ortiz	México	[The Tiras] One of the short stories included in the collection entitled La primera piedra.
1951	Look Down in Mercy	Walter Baxter	UK	A British officer in the Burma campaign in World War II falls in love with his batman.
1951	Mémoires d'Hadrien	"Marguerite Yourcenar" (Marguerite Cleenewerck de Crayencour)	France	[Memoirs of Hadrian] The book takes the form of a letter to Hadrian's adoptive grandson and eventual successor “Mark". The emperor meditates on military triumphs, love of poetry and music, philosophy, and his passion for his lover Antinous.
1951	Parents' Day	Paul Goodman	US	The book's narrator, an unnamed teacher, grapples with his homosexuality and explores a series of sexual attractions and relationships that culminates in his being fired by the school. Written as autobiographical fiction based on the author's experiences teaching.
1951	Il conformist	"Alberto Moravia" (Alberto Pincherle)	Italy	[The Conformist] A tragedy, details the life and desire for normality of Marcello Clerici, a government official during Italy's fascist period.
1951	Leopard in the Grass	Desmond Stirling Stewart	UK	John Stirling, a young British archaeologist, arrives in Cyropolis with the intention of working for the local government on archaeological excavations. There he falls into a sexual relationship with Sophie Abbas, a Jewish divorcee, often thinking of the relationships he had with other boys during his school days. One day he befriends Q, a British gay artist, and Nimr, a Bedouin whom Q took in as a child.
1951	Internato	Paulo Hecker Filho	Brazil	[Boarding School] It tells the story of Jorge, a teenager trying to discover or accept his homosexuality at boarding school, and his love and desire for Eli in many different ways. In this work, the author intended, albeit misguidedly, to denounce the exploitation of the vulnerable, including child sexual abuse, by addressing the topic of homosexuality.
1952	Hemlock and After	Angus Wilson	UK	The novel offers a candid portrayal of gay life in post-World War II England.
1952	Fabrizio Lupo	Carlo Coccioli	Italy	The Italian painter Fabrizio is going to exhibit in Paris and meets Laurent, a French sculptor, they both fall in love, but stumble upon the rejection of society, Fabrizio's deep Catholicism, and the personalities of the two.
1952	Pena de muerte	Enrique Lafourcade Valdenegro	Chile	[Death Penalty]
1952	Machos cabríos	Jorge Ferretis	México	[Male Goats] One of the short stories included in the collection entitled El coronel que asesinó un palomo y otros cuentos. In Mexico City, in a viceregal palace converted into a vecindad, a new tenant arrives: Filemón—an archetype of the homosexual of that decade—who avoids contact with adults but enjoys playing with and caring for the children. The story, a reflection of its time, treats homosexuality as an illness and shows that, after several trials, he can regain his heterosexuality. Interestingly, the protagonist appears immune to the insults and mistreatment he receives. The narration of the protagonist's adventures and misadventures moves between the tone of the picaresque novel, parody, and tragicomedy.
1953	Kinjiki	"Yukio Mishima" (Kimitake Hiraoka)	Japan	[Forbidden Colors] The name kinjiki is a euphemism for same-sex love. It describes a marriage of a Gay man to a young woman.
1953	The Charioteer	"Mary Renault" (Eileen Mary Challans)	UK	Due to its positive portrayal of homosexuality, it was not able to be published in the US until 1959. Renault would continue to explore homosexual themes in her later novels – beginning with the 1956 The Last of the Wine – but using an Ancient Greek setting to evade censorship.
1953	The Heart in Exile	"Rodney Garland" (Adam de Hegedus)	UK	A psychiatrist, Tony Page, investigates the mysterious suicide of another man, Julian Leclerc, who years before had been his lover.
1953*	Ernesto	Umberto Saba	Italy	[Ernest] Details the moments when Ernesto -a 16-year-old apprentice clerk- discover of his homosexuality when he meets a stable boy -a 28-year-old laborer identified as “the man”- and his intense sexual relationship. And a year later, his attraction to Emilio −15 years-old and nicknamed "Ilio"- a talented violin student. Written in 1953, was published posthumously in 1975.
1953*	Queer	William Seward Burroughs II	US	A short novel written between 1951 and 1953, published in 1985. It is partially a sequel to his earlier novel, Junkie. It was adapted into a film in 2024. Tells the story of William Lee, a disillusioned American expatriate living in Mexico City, who becomes fixated on Eugene Allerton, a young, handsome ex-Navy man. It was doubtful whether much of the content could be published in the US at that time since the heavy homosexual content and theme could be held as obscene. Despite his frequent and uncompromising writings on homosexuality, Burroughs has not been viewed as a gay author by many readers.
1953	Cara e' santo	Rafael Díaz Ycaza	Ecuador	[Saint Face] In this short story, a man appears dead floating in a river, it is Julio Barbosa, Samborondón's political lieutenant, who unsuccessfully tried to seduce the protagonist.
1953	La hojarasca	Gabriel García Márquez	Colombia	[Leaf Storm] Debut novel by García Márquez. In the play, the boy's character shows a homoerotic desire towards his friend Abraham, with whom he spends much of his free time.
1953	The World Well Lost	"Theodore Sturgeon" (Edward Hamilton Waldo)	US	Its sensitive treatment of homosexuality was unusual for science fiction published at that time, and it is now regarded as a milestone in science fiction's portrayal of homosexuality.
1953	Trans-Atlantyk	Witold Gombrowicz	France	[Transatlantic] The semi-autobiographical plot of the novel closely tracks Gombrowicz's own experience in the years during and just after the outbreak of World War II. It was published in Paris in 1953, and four years later in Poland. The novel is set in late August and early September 1939. Witold, a Polish writer, embarks on an ocean voyage only for war to break out while he visits Argentina. Finding himself penniless and stranded after the Nazis take over his country, he is taken in by the local community of Polish emigrants. The narrator contrasts the patriotic cult of the "Homeland" (represented by old Tomasz) with the fascination with the "Filiation" (synczyzna) (represented by the young upper-class soldier, Ignacy, Tomasz's son) in opposition to the dedication to the own desires and passions (represented by the eccentric millionaire Gonzalo Andes, an Argentine homosexual to whom the beautiful Ignacy becomes the object of his passion).
1954	Der Tod in Rom	Wolfgang Koeppen	Germany	[Death in Rome] A parody of Death in Venice where the protagonist does not die.
1954	A zaklatott éjfél	"Rodney Garland" (Adam de Hegedus)	Hungary	[The Troubled Midnight] A gay-themed espionage thriller, published by Coward-McCann.
1954*	Tirésias	“Théophile” (Marcel Jouhandeau)	France	[Tiresias] Tells the myth of Tiresias: Man and woman, blind and soothsayer; this is the ambiguous and complex figure that the writer uses as a reference to recount his secret dates with four men: Richard, Philippe, Pierre and a young man he calls the Dwarf, who offer him their bodies for money. This narrative, with a high autobiographical content, conveys the experience of homosexuality as lived by its author: mortifying, obscene, liberating and, above all, deeply aesthetic. This short novel was written in 1954, but was not published until 1977 under a pseudonym, and for the first time under the author's name in 1988.
1954	Sangue de Rosaura	Luiz Canabrava	Brazil	[Blood of Rosaura] This book of short stories earned Canabrava the Prêmio Fábio Prado from the Sociedade Paulista de Escritores (now the União Brasileira de Escritores) the previous year. It includes the title story and O Menino. The stories depict violence, pain, and imprisonment, combined with expressions of repressed homoerotic desire.
1955	Erebo	Pablo Gumiel	Bolivia	[Erebus] The novel begins with a reunion between Jacob and his lover in a lonely station, and in a hotel room, Jacob reads a letter with his lover in which he recounts his life and how much he has suffered due to social rejection of his sexual orientation, from the discrimination he was subjected to as a child to the tragic death of his first love.
1955	Ragazzi di vita	Pier Paolo Pasolini	Italy	[Boys of Life; or, The Hustlers] The novel tells the story of Riccetto, a street urchin to whom over the next few years, goes from robbery to scam to prostituting himself and back again while drifting around. During this time, many of his companions are killed or die off and there is constant immorality at hand.
1955	La confessione	Mario Soldati	Italy	[The Confession] Coming of age story of a young man, Clemente, a sensitive teenager, feeling the first signs of manhood, a little murky, a little too "aware of himself" compared to his companions. The Jesuits educate him -and Clement himself wants to think that one day he will become a Jesuit. The novel captures the confusion and urges of youth and the hypocritical taboos which society places on the behavior of young people.
1955	Ragazzo di Trastevere	Giuseppe Patroni Griffi	Italy	[The Boy of Trastevere] Tell about a young subproletarian who is as handsome as he, Othello, who prostitutes himself in all "innocence", despite being married, also starting real relationships with rich homosexuals.
1955	Tagebuch einer männlichen Braut	Walter Homann	Germany	[Diary of a Male Bride] From the teased schoolboy ("Puppe") to the celebrated female impersonator, from the "Baroness F." to "Countess H." leads the path of "blonde Dori", who finally puts an end to his life for fear of being discovered. The diary reflects the personal experiences of the author, but also deals with the fate of the Comtesse Dina Alma de Paradeda.
1955	The Talented Mr. Ripley	Patricia Highsmith	US	Tom Ripley, a con artist, is paid by a shipbuilding magnate to go to Italy to convince his son Dickie Greenleaf to return to New York and join the family business. Ripley befriends the younger Greenleaf and falls in love with the rich young man's indulgent, carefree lifestyle; he also becomes obsessed with Dickie himself.
1955	Ambassador of Loss	"Michael Scarrott" (Arthur Stanley Theodore Fisher)	UK	The novel describes the life in a Dorset public school in the early part of the 20th century, and the relationship between two young students.
1955	Behind the Mirror	"Robin Maugham" (Robert Cecil Romer Maugham, 2nd Viscount Maugham)	UK	David Brent is a screenwriter for a London-based film company who travels to Tanganyika in search of former diplomat Norman Hartleigh. Upon arriving in the small village of Aruna, he discovers that Hartleigh is ostracized by the other residents for what they perceive as an inappropriate relationship with the young man, Bill Wayne, who lives with him.
1955*	O vampiro das rosas	Nataniel Dantas	Brazil	[The Vampire of Roses] One of the short stories included in the collection entitled Veias desatadas. Written in 1955 and published in 1960. The story is about a young man who has deviated from the prevailing moral norms.
1955	El casado	"Pita Amor" (Guadalupe Teresa Amor Schmidtlein)	Mexico	[The Married Man] One of the short stories included in the collection entitled Galería de títeres. Tells the story of two young lovers who face the social fear of being discovered. To dispel his family's suspicions and keep their romance hidden, one of them decides to find a girlfriend and later get married. The newlyweds open a restaurant in the capital, which becomes the setting where the husband's lover frequently visits to exchange glances and caresses.
1955	Ces princes	"Catherine Guérard" (Catherine Dreyfus)	France	[Princes] The novel introduces us to the love affair between two men—a French army general and university student Antoine Villaert—and the conflicts between the responsibilities of the war hero and the passionate ardor of the romantic hero.
1956	Giovanni's Room	James Baldwin	US	Though controversial, Giovanni's Room was acclaimed by the critics of its time and listed, in the late 90s, as the second best queer novel of all times by The Publishing Triangle. It follows the story of an American expat in 1950s Paris and his love affair with Giovanni, an Italian immigrant. Tragic, realistic and lyrical, one of Baldwin's most acclaimed novels.
1956	The Last of the Wine	"Mary Renault" (Eileen Mary Challans)	South Africa	Set in Athens at the close of the Golden Age and the end of the Peloponnesian War with Sparta, and includes Socrates as a character. The first of several historical novels that Renault would write which dealt with homosexuality in an Ancient Greek setting.
1956	Thin Ice	Compton Mackenzie	UK	It tells the career of a homosexual politician seen through the eyes of his lifelong, heterosexual friend.
1956	Chocolates for Breakfast	Pamela Moore	US	The novel gained notoriety from readers and critics for its frank depiction of teenage sexuality, and its discussion of the taboo topics of homosexuality and gender roles.
1956	Grande Sertão: Veredas	João Guimarães Rosa	Brazil	[The Devil to Pay in the Backlands] It narrates in first person the life of adventures of jagunço Riobaldo. He is joined by Diadorim, a boy for whom he begins to feel a strong attraction to the point that "I coveted to eat and drink what he left, I coveted to put my hand where he put it”.
1957	Siranger	Renato Pellegrini	Argentina	It tells the story of a 17-year-old boy who fails every time he has a naked woman on his hands, and who feels tempted to make friends with men who are visibly single and misogynistic. It is an autobiographical story about the persecutions and discriminations that the author suffered in his adolescence, as a homosexual and an internal migrant.
1957*	El cuerpo de Giulia-No	Jorge Eduardo Eielson Sánchez	Peru	[Giulia-No's Body] Written between 1955 and 1957, published in 1971, it has autobiographical elements of life, and the particular one that he maintains with two characters: Giulia, his idyllic lover, and Giuliano, a young man who initiates Eduardo sexually. Years later, the protagonist will become a vulgar and obese businessman obsessed with his business.
1957	Aubade	Kenneth Martin	US	Paul Anderson has taken a job at a tobacconist's shop for the summer before beginning university. One day, the young man named Gary/John Knight enters and thought about what it might be like to be friends with him. Those overwhelming feelings of wanting to spend time with him initially go unclassified, but when they do start spending time together it begins to be clear there is mutual feeling and what those feelings mean.
1957	L'isola di Arturo	Elsa Morante	Italy	[Arturo's Island] Arturo Gerace was born on the island of Procida and spent his entire childhood and adolescence there, the island encloses its entire world. Many of the homosexual interpretations attributed to this novel, characterized by its notes on youth sexuality, have a great connection with the friendship that the author maintained with the filmmaker Luchino Visconti.
1957*	El ahogado	"Tristán Solarte" (Guillermo Sánchez Borbón)	Panama	[The Drowned] The narration of this novel is carried out in the third person through one of its protagonists, Doctor Martínez, a doctor from Bocas del Toro where this story takes place. In this novel, each of his characters is progressively introduced as Doctor Martínez describes the interviews he conducts to clarify the death of Rafael, a 17-year-old poet. Written between 1953 and 1954, it was published until 1957.
1957	Behind These Walls	"Christopher Teale" (Frank Earl Fleck)	US	It tells the story of the friendship between "Tex", a multi-offender and adult prisoner, and "Red", a handsome and innocent young man sentenced to life imprisonment for killing his girlfriend. From the day of his arrival, the boy attracts the interest of all the wolves that populate the prison, whose sexual attacks he will only be able to avoid thanks to the protection and teachings of the adult, who feels disturbingly and silently attracted to him. The sole novel by Frank Earl Fleck (1904–1970), who was born in Pittsburgh and spent most of his adult life in and out of prisons for counterfeiting, armed robbery, and other crimes.
1957*	Ek Sadak Sattavan Galiyan	Kamleshwar Prasad Saxena	India	[The Street with Fifty-Seven Lanes] Originally titled Badnam Basti (Infamous Neighbourhood), was serialized in the Hindi journal Hans in 1956 and published as novel in 1957. Sarnam Singh, a truck driver and a dacoit, meets a Brahmin boy Shivraj and the two become physically and emotionally intimate. At the same time, he is also involved with the nautanki dancer Bansari, whom he saved from being raped by another bandit. The theme of homosexual interest between the two male characters caused Kamaleshwar's novel to attract controversy; and in the film adaptation in 1971, the director Prem Kapoor had to excise scenes from the novel and make their relationship only suggestive in order to receive clearance by the film censorship board.
1958	The Bell	Iris Murdoch	UK	
1958	The King Must Die	"Mary Renault" (Eileen Mary Challans)	South Africa	Is bildungsroman and historical novel that traces the early life and adventures of Theseus, a hero in Greek mythology.
1958	A Glass of Blessings	Barbara Pym	UK	It deals with the growing estrangement of a well-to-do married couple and the means by which harmony is restored.
1958	A Room in Chelsea Square	Anonymous (Michael Nelson)	UK	It is about a wealthy gentleman who lures an attractive younger man to London with the promise of an upper crust lifestyle. Is a "camp" novel about "bitchy queens in 1950s London", the text is semi-autobiographical.
1958	Gli occhiali d'oro	Giorgio Bassani	Italy	[The Golden Glasses] A young Jewish student of the faculty of literature tells the story of Fadigati, an established doctor in Ferrara, known both for his ability, his refinement and his culture, both for his presumed and latent homosexuality, which costs him marginalization from his high social class.
1958	The Gaudy Image	"William Talsman" (James M. Smith)	US	Describes the life among the community in the French Quarter of New Orleans. Thomas Schwartz (aka Titania, Queen of the Fairies) wanders about in search of the Gaudy Image -that most masculine man, a dream lover who knows what he wants.
1958	Tage mit Antonio	"Wolfgang Cordan" (Heinrich Wolfgang Horn)	Germany	[Days with Antonio].
1958*	Costa Brava	"Victor Servatius" (Frits Bernard)	Netherlands	With a didactic vocation, aimed at making the general public understand the nature of pedophilia, the work narrates in the first person the friendly relationship between the director of a Venezuelan film company and a 12-year-old boy who took refuge in Spain during the Civil War. It was published until 1960.
1958*	Lieutenant-Colonel de Maumort	Roger Martin du Gard	France	The author presents his reflections in the form of memoirs written by Bertrand de Maumort, an aristocrat, soldier, and intellectual. Through his portrayal of Maumort and a fascinating array of secondary characters, dissects mankind in general, and calls into question whether true civilization, much less human progress, exists at all. From 1941 until his death, Du Gard worked on his unfinished novel, after acquiring the manuscript it was published in 1983 by André Daspre.
1958	The Middle Age of Mrs Eliot	Angus Wilson	UK	Depicts the fate of Meg Eliot, a happy and active woman, the wife of a lawyer, who finds herself a widow in reduced circumstances after the shocking murder of her husband Bill abroad. Her attempts to rebuild her life are contrasted with the self-isolation of her brother, David Parker, who lives with her dying partner Gordon Paget in a commercial nursery in Sussex.
1958	The Sergeant	Dennis Murphy	US	A military sergeant falls in love with a soldier under his command. The soldier reacts violently to the sergeant's advances, and, completely isolated, ends up committing suicide. Murphy wrote the screenplay for the 1968 adaptation.
1958	El norte	Emilio Carbadillo Fentanes	México	[The Norther; or, The North] It was translated into English by Margaret Sayers Peden in 1968, and published by the University of Texas Press. The novel alternates between odd-numbered chapters, which narrate the past, and even-numbered chapters, which recount the events of the present. Tells the love story of Isabel, an elderly widow, and Aristeo, a young man from Tepito. Due to the nature of their relationship, they run away to a boarding house in a port city in Veracruz, where they pose as aunt and nephew. There they meet Max, a port adventurer who sleeps with Isabel for the sole purpose of separating her from Aristeo, as he wants him for himself.
1959	La narración de la historia	Carlos Correas	Argentina	[The Telling of the Story] Correas was the first who dared to reflect the homosexual subculture in Argentina, a condition for which he paid dearly. He recounted a street fling and an explicit sexual relationship between two boys, belonging to different social classes: a petty-bourgeois student and a street boy.
1959	L'Anonimo lombardo	Alberto Arbasino	Italy	[The Anonymous Lombard] At a "première" of La Scala, a young neoclassical and romantic student meets love by surprise. And he immediately decides to live it and write it in the form of a novel. But behind the revered shadows of the engineer Gadda and the Abbot Parini lurk many narrative temptations.
1959	A Way of Love	James Courage	New Zealand	Set in the London gay community, its first-person narrative (an unusual device for Courage) describes the course of a homosexual relationship between middle-aged architect Bruce Quantock and young student Philip Dill. Is identified as New Zealand's first gay novel.
1959	L'Exilé de Capri	Roger Peyrefitte	France	[The Exile of Capri] The novel was based on the lives of Jacques d'Adelswärd-Fersen and Nino Cesarini, and their stay on the island of Capri, as well as in their circle of homosexual friends who received at Villa Lysis.
1959	Advise and Consent	Allen Drury	US	The novel reflects the era of McCarthyism, where political machinations were plotted to achieve favorable results for a party, using blackmail and incriminating for being communists or homosexuals.
1959	Para subir al cielo	Enrique Lafourcade Valdenegro	Chile	[To Go Up to Heaven] Lucanor is a sailor who is abandoned in Valparaíso, there he meets Angela, who is a member of the aristocratic Eguirreizaga family, made up of his mother Doña Isidora, and his brothers: Antinous and Pedro. Antinous is a non-conformist, a dilettante who has an ambiguous friendship with the priest Don Ezequiel.
1959	Crônica da casa assassinada	Lúcio Cardoso	Brazil	[Chronicle of the Murdered House] The story focuses on the decay of the Meneses family and depicts themes such as extramarital affairs, forbidden love, incestuous relationships, kinship, homosexuality, and violent acts. The story is told through letters, diary pages, and memories.
1959	The Feathers of Death	Simon Raven	UK	Scandal rocks a British army regiment in East Africa after Alastair Lynch, an officer, shoots drummer Malcolm Harley in the back for desertion. The resulting inquiry leads to a trial that reveals the true relationship between the two men and raises issues of class, motivation, and sexuality.
1959	At Fever Pitch	David Caute	UK	Set in a British colony on the edge of independence, the central character is Lieut. Michael Glyn, an English lad of good family and education who has no sense of vocation for his job and is emotional to the point of hysteria.
1959*	Un amor fora ciutat	Manuel de Pedrolo Sanchez i Molina	Spain	[A Love Outside the Walls] A woman discovers, through the denunciation of a scorned ex-lover, that her husband is homosexual. She is hurt by his infidelity, but the fact that he is homosexual disgusts her. He tries to justify his condition and to do so he tells her about his life, from his childhood, from his first experiences. Written in 1959, no publisher dared to publish it until 1970. But even then it did not pass the censorship filter, as the book was seized and its author tried for public scandal, as it dealt with homosexuality without falling into the homophobia in force at the time.
1959	Negrura	Virgilio Rodríguez Macal	Spain	[Blackness] A novel of which only one edition was published in Spain in 1959 by Editorial Colenda and, with the exception of a few copies the author left in Guatemala, it remained largely unknown nationwide. This novel by Rodríguez Macal completely departs from his ecological style, in which he dared to write about a subject that was not only sensitive for the time but also vindicated certain sectors of German society that had not been in favor of Nazism.
1959	Meglio l'Uovo Oggi	"Giò Stajano" (Countess Maria Gioacchina Stajano Starace Briganti di Panico)	Italy	[Better an Egg Today] Initially titled Meglio l'Uomo Oggi (Better a Man Today), it focuses on the “scandalous” world of homosexuals in Rome in the late 1950s, a roman à clef that makes no attempt to conceal the homosexuality of several public figures, including the former King of Italy, Umberto II, nicknamed “Umbertina”, and features an orgy in which an actor resembling Laurence Olivier participates in drag. The author enjoys revealing the homosexuality of directors, politicians, and artists, concealing their names with subtle mime, which led to the book's immediate confiscation. The novel tells the story of Tony, a penniless Roman who begins catering to the desires of influential homosexuals in order to achieve a more comfortable life.
1959	A esmorga	Eduardo Blanco Amor	Spain	[The Party] The novel tells the story of the revelry of three characters, Cibrán el Castizo, Xanciño el Bocas, and Aladio Milhomes, who spend an entire day and night drinking, and which will end in tragedy for all. It is the first Galician novel to explicitly address homosexual themes. One of the characters, Milhomes, is repeatedly described by Cibrán as having effeminate traits, and he feels jealous when Xan is with women. Furthermore, both Milhomes and Xan engage in playful teasing, pinching, and touching each other on several occasions. The book has been filmed twice: in 1977 by Gonzalo Suárez under name of Parranda, and in 2014 by Ignacio Vilar as A Esmorga.
1959*	Los Malabé	José de la Colina	México	[The Malabé’s] The story first appeared in 1958 in the Revista de la Universidad magazine. Later, the author included it in his first book of short stories: Ven, caballo gris. The narrator is Felipe, a young traveling salesman who arrives at a commercial port to negotiate the price of a large shipment of coffee sacks with Mr. Francisco Malabert, a wealthy, elderly, mulatto man who is mistreated by his sisters. During his stay, he also meets Nepomuceno, a Black boatman who knows the secret of “Paquita Malabé”.
1959	Nocturno del viajero	José de la Colina	México	[Nocturne of the Traveler] One of the short stories included in the collection entitled Ven, caballo gris. De la Colina rewrites the myth of Ulysses and Penelope, in which a young couple visits a hospital so that the woman can have an abortion. The doctor who attends to them is described by the protagonist as an unmanly man, someone who, in his opinion, is incapable of understanding the situation he and the pregnant woman are in. The young man harshly criticizes the doctor, questioning whether a man who has never been with a woman can even know what it's like to have a child.

=== 1960s ===
Year	Title	Author	Country	Notes
1960	We Think the World of You	Joe Randolph Ackerley	UK	In post-war London an aimless young married bisexual man, Johnny, is sent to prison. He is forced to entrust his beloved Alsatian dog, Evie, to the reluctant care of his down-trodden parents and older, middle-class ex-lover and best friend, Frank. A set of tragi-comic relationships evolve with the dog coming to represent the hold they have over each other.
1960	¡Justicia, Señor Gobernador!	Hugo Lindo Olivares	El Salvador	[Justice, Mr. Governor!] Written in the first person and structured in a double twisted plot line. The jurist Amenábar is declared incompetent of his position and taken to the asylum for a ruling in the opinion of his colleagues that was wrong. While a murderer with feminine features is brought to trial. It is one of the first novels that deals with the subject of transvestism in El Salvador.
1960	Il Gesuita Perfetto	Furio Monicelli	Italy	[The Perfect Jesuit] Seeking refuge from the world in the strict discipline and religious certainty of training for the priesthood, Andrea, a Jesuit novice, is a deeply troubled young man. He is wracked by both intellectual doubts and the urgings of his heart: the firstare personified by the anti-authoritarian Brother Zanna, a man full of difficult questions and rebellious thoughts; the second by the angelic Brother Lodovici -boyish, otherworldly and enviably holy.
1960	Saman lagt spott og speki	Elías Mar	Iceland	[A Combination of Mockery and Wisdom] Is considered the first Icelandic literary work with an openly homosexual theme.
1960	La tregua	Mario Benedetti Farrugia	Uruguay	[The Truce: The Dairy of Martín Santomé] Jaime Santomé, the protagonist's most beloved son, reveals that he is homosexual and thus breaks the expectations that his family had of him. The representation of homosexuality is quite negative in the novel and is seen as a weakness on the part of the protagonist and as a cause of the decline of families. It was translated into English in 1969 by Benjamin Graham for Harper & Row.
1960	Bramy raju	Jerzy Andrzejewski	Poland	[The Gates of Paradise] Tells the story of the Children's Crusade of 1212 trying to reach the Holy Land. Through the children's confessions, true and false, the beginning of the path is described, the reasons that pushed the children and young people to travel a long path. Sad stories intertwine, branch and intertwine again. One of them, by Alexei Melissen, is about a love triangle between Jacques de Cloyes and Count Louis de Blois.
1960	The Hero Continues	Donald Windham	US	Written as a roman à clef, is about and dedicated to his dear friend Tennessee Williams, this book meanders through the seasons of a playwright's career as he climbs New York's social ladder and loses himself along the way.
1960	Pornografia	Witold Gombrowicz	Poland	[Pornography] Witold, the protagonist, who lives in wartime Poland, meets the mysterious Fryderyk during one of his gatherings with friends, whose eccentric behaviour combined with considerable refinement and familiarity with the art world seems so intriguing that he decides to curtail his relationship with the man. The extent of their relationship is not explicitly stated, and some critics admit the hypothesis of a homosexual relationship between them.
1960	Jade Love	Pai Hsien-yung	Taiwan	Written in first person and told through the eyes of a 10-year-old boy, the story takes place in Guilin, China (the author's hometown) during the Second Sino-Japanese War. It was adapted into a film in 1984, and as a television series in 1997 by Taiwan, and in 2006 by China.
1961	Los inocentes (libro)	Oswaldo Reynoso	Peru	[The Innocents; or, Lima on Rock] Series of urban realism stories focused on Lima and its adolescent and youthful characters grouped in gangs. The book caused a scandal for its stark description of youth on the street, who did not veil their sexuality, including homosexual characters.
1961	The Soft Machine	William Seward Burroughs II	US	
1961	El Sexto	José María Arguedas Altamirano	Peru	The novel is based on the author's prison experience in the El Sexto prison under the dictatorship of Óscar R. Benavides.
1961	The Leather Boys	Eliot George (Gillian Freeman)	UK	Tells the story of a gay relationship between two young working-class London men, Reggie and Pete, one married and the other a biker. The novel is an example of British kitchen sink realism. The author does not treat homosexuality as a personal or social problem but takes for granted that the love between these two inarticulate young men could exist between two human beings at any time at any place. The novel was adapted in 1964, for which Freeman wrote the screenplay and was credited with her real name.
1961	The Primal Urge	Brian Wilson Aldiss	UK	A satire on sexual reserve, it explores the effects on society of a forehead-mounted "Emotion Register" that glows when the wearer experiences sexual attraction.
1961	The Pilgrimage	John Broderick	Ireland	Published in the United States as “The Chameleons”. Tells the story of Julia Glynn, the very model of a 'prim and well-conducted' bourgeois Catholic wife, and her crippled husband Michael, the richest man in town. In his illness he is dutifully tended to by the household manservant Stephen Lydon and by his handsome young nephew Doctor Jim. The suicide of local boy Tommy Baggot, a well-known figure within Dublin's secretive homosexual community, appears to be connected to Stephen and Michael.
1961	Conventional Weapons	Jocelyn Brooke	UK	The novel introduces a stratum of English middle-class society before and after World War II as the divergent paths of the two Tuffnell-Greene brothers unfold. Geoffrey joins the army, marries and sets up in business, but eventually ends up an exile in Malta; Nigel drifts into a seedy London life of drinking, parties and half-hearted gay liaisons, and finds some fame as an artist and novelist. As in most of his previous works, elements of his experiences and his love of military life appear, to the point that much of his fiction can be considered at least partly autobiographical.
1962	Another Country	James Baldwin	US	The novel is primarily set in Greenwich Village and Harlem, New York City, in the late 1950s. It portrayed many themes that were taboo at the time of its release, including bisexuality, interracial couples and extramarital affairs.
1962	Bericht über Bruno	Joseph Breitbach	Germany	[Report on Bruno] The story is told from the perspective of the Minister of the Interior of a small monarchy, who has just been overthrown by the machinations of his grandson Bruno Collignon. He is now giving an account of his life and his relationship with his grandson.
1962	The Wanting Seed	Anthony Burgess	UK	The dystopian novel addresses many societal issues, the main theme of which is overpopulation and its relation to culture. A significant portion of the book is a condemnation of war. There is also active discrimination against heterosexuals, homosexuality being encouraged as a measure against overpopulation, as well as self-sterilization is recommended. Religion, government, and history are also addressed.
1962	Los impuros	Eugenia Viteri Segura	Ecuador	[The Uncleans] One of the short stories included in the collection entitled Doce cuentos. It narrates the wake of a homosexual man after his suicide. This is attended by his parents, who ask themselves ashamed about the mistakes they could have made to have such a child, and his lover, who turns out to be the only one who loved the deceased just as he was.
1962	Down There on a Visit	Christopher Isherwood	UK	In the novel Isherwood derives meaning and emotion from those around him. The novel's four sections describe four people who influenced him. Mr Lancaster introduces the young Christopher to the danger of asceticism. Ambrose (based on Francis Turville-Petre) inadvertently warns Christopher of isolationism. Waldemar embodies the surreality of heterosexual marriage. Finally, Isherwood encounters a famous male prostitute named Paul (based on Denham Fouts). The two men resolve to explore a regimented spiritual lifestyle centered on self-denial and meditation. Other characters are based on the botanist couple Rupert Barneby and Dwight Ripley, the actor Richard Kitchin, the painter Tony Bower, the academic Gerald Heard and the socialite Jean Connolly.
1962	The Dream	"Hal Porter" (Harold Edward Porter)	Australia	In this short story, the author fictionalizes a romance with a student, an indiscretion that went unpunished.
1963	City of Night	John Rechy	US	Follows a hustler in his travels across America. Includes discussion of the Cooper Do-nuts Riot, an early event in the gay liberation movement, seen as a precursor to the Stonewall riots.
1963	Making Do	Paul Goodman	US	
1963	Por qué Jesús no vuelve	Benjamín Carrión Mora	Ecuador	[Why Doesn't Jesus Come Back?] The novel follows the story of Juan Antonio Molina, a boy from Loja's upper class who lives amid the religiosity of his hometown, which he leaves when he travels to Quito to do his university studies and there he meets Enrique Santa Cruz, considered the most cultured and elegant man in the city.
1963	Honey for the Bears	Anthony Burgess	UK	An English antique dealer, Paul Hussey, and his errant wife, Belinda – on a sea voyage to Leningrad in Soviet Russia, they become embroiled with black marketeers, secret policemen and political dissidents. When the protagonist discovers his wife's illicit affair with another woman, his own submerged sexual feelings come breaking through the surface.
1963	A luta	Samuel Rawet	Brazil	[The Fight] One of the short stories included in the collection entitled Diálogo. A man wakes up with no memory of his past; not even the word "fight" exists for him. After realizing he is a man, he sees a body similar to his own and a fight breaks out. The story's central theme is the encounter and the need for communication; this blurring of bodily boundaries is a recurring theme in literature when addressing the homosexual experience.
1963	O aprendizado	Samuel Rawet	Brazil	[Learning] One of the short stories included in the collection entitled Diálogo. It tells the story of Clemente, a man in his forties who lives a life incompatible with what his family considers proper. One Sunday, he receives his family: uncle, aunt, cousin, siblings, and sister-in-law. They all unanimously ask him to renounce something that isn't explicitly mentioned, but it's implied that the renunciation entails a more “stable, serene, and unchanging” way of life.
1963	Green Is the Grass	Kuo Liang-hui	Taiwan	The story follows two Taiwanese middle school boys who exhibit sexual and romantic desires toward each other.
1964	Last Exit to Brooklyn	Hubert Selby Jr.	US	The novel takes a harsh, uncompromising look at lower class Brooklyn in the 1950s written in a brusque, everyman style of prose. It is divided into six stories that connect to each other.
1964	A Single Man	Christopher Isherwood	US	Set in Southern California during 1962, it depicts one day in the life of George, a middle-aged Englishman who is a professor at a Los Angeles university, who is grieving the recent death of his longtime partner. time Jim.
1964	L'apprenti sorcier	François Augiéras	France	[The Sorcerer's Apprentice]
1964	41 o el muchacho que soñaba en fantasmas	"Paolo Po" (Manuel Aguilar de la Torre)	Mexico	[41 or The Boy Who Dreamed of Ghosts] It is the first Mexican literary work whose central theme is homosexual love.
1964	Las picardías de Goyo Momo	"Benjamín Amérika" (Alberto Quiroz Hernández)	Mexico	[Goyo Momo's Mischief] The novel humorously portrays the adventures of a homosexual, Goyo Momo, who is harassed by men and women, through a description of his life.
1964	El diario de José Toledo	Miguel Barbachano Ponce	Mexico	[The Diary of José Toledo] It tells the story of a boy –José Toledo, a twenty-year-old civil servant– who suffers from the absence and disinterest of his lover Wenceslao, another unemployed young man with a tendency to sadism, who sometimes cross-dresses or prostitutes himself. Unable to see reality, José deceives himself by weaving an unreal love story, on which he bets everything.
1964	Asfalto	Renato Pellegrini	Argentina	[Asphalt] It tells the story of Eduardo Ales, a young man from Córdoba -in the interior of Argentina-, who, when he was released from the secondary school where he was in his last year, decides to leave his family and move to Buenos Aires. There he will come into contact with an underworld that he had hardly heard of until then and he will meet a series of characters that will challenge many of his beliefs, mainly those related to love and sexuality.
1964	Nova Express	William Seward Burroughs II	US	Describes the clashes between the Nova Mob and the Nova Police. The novel is a social commentary on human and machine control of life. The police are focused on “first-order addictions of junkies, homosexuals, dissidents, and criminals; if these criminals vanish, the police must create more in order to justify their own survival”.
1964	El Monstruo Sagrado	Edgardo de Habich y Palacio	Peru	[The Sacred Monster] The novel, based on true events, narrates the assassination of ambassador Jorge MacLean y Estenós by his secretary and lover Juan Antonio Perazo in 1951.
1964	The Dark Light Years	Brian Wilson Aldiss	UK	So after some years of space exploration and around 300 Earth-type planets, they land on the next planet and find the Utods, nicknamed "rhino men" due to their bulk and careless behavior, are a sophisticated and peaceful extraterrestrial race that has developed advanced technology and philosophy. These gentle aliens whose physical and mental health requires wallowing in mud and filth, and who – though they achieved interstellar space flight – are not even recognised as intelligent by the humans. The text is a sociopolitical satire about humankind's rationalization for violence through their inability to understand another culture and thus perceiving it as lesser.
1964	The Soft Spot: Four Short Stories	"Alexander Goodman" (George Haimsohn)	US	With these short stories, the writer explores his own life and the gay world in which he lives. The stories included are: Gaylord Merriewether III (In which the narrator likes to sleep with a very good-looking sailor), Smile! (A portrait about the life of a photographer), The Spanish Boys, and, The Rug Salesman.
1964	Abama	Samuel Rawet	Brazil	This short novel tells the story of Zacarias, an appliance salesman who decides to embark on a quest to find his personal demon. He begins a journey of numerous chance encounters with strangers, men and women—figures of the night—as if projecting himself onto them and thus discovering his demon. Finally, in a ritual that blends transformation and purification, Zacarias draws his double, Abama, in pencil on paper.
1964	A la víbora de la mar	Carlos Fuentes Macías	Mexico	[To the Snake of the Sea; or, The Sea-Snakes] One of the short stories included in the collection entitled Cantar de ciegos. Tells the story of an innocent young woman who falls into the clutches of a couple of con artists who prey on women traveling alone on cruise ships. Interestingly, the story reverses the roles of the classic figures of the erastes and the eromenos.
1965	Midnight Cowboy	James Leo Herlihy	US	Chronicles the naïve Texan Joe Buck's odyssey from Texas to New York City, where he plans on realizing his dream of becoming a male prostitute servicing rich women. In 1969, the novel was made into the movie but only depicted the second half of the book, with events from the first half condensed or briefly seen as flashbacks. Directed by John Schlesinger and written by Waldo Salt, the film was commercially and critically successful. At the 42nd Academy Awards, the film won the Academy Award for Best Picture, Best Director and Adapted Screenplay.
1965	No End to the Way	"Neville Jackson" (Gerald Marcus Glaskin)	Australia	Set in Perth, Western Australia, presents the loving and tragic relationship between Ray, the narrator, and Cor, the young Dutchman he meets in a bar. At first the attraction between them is purely physical but as their knowledge of each other grows their relationship develops into a permanent and caring de facto 'marriage' – despite the efforts of Cor's ex-lover to destroy it. Was the first Australian gay novel.
1965	Das Waisenhaus	Hubert Fichte	Germany	[The Orphanage] A Jewish boy, Detlev, arrives at a Catholic orphanage in Scheyern and awaits the return of his mother, from whom he separated due to the relocation of children during the war. The work has autobiographical elements.
1965	Al vencedor	"Marta Lynch" (Marta Lía Frigerio)	Argentina	[To the Victor] Describes the adventures of two young conscripts, Benjamín (narrator) and Tulio, after completing their mandatory military service. Lynch displays a masculine universe where the paradigmatically homosocial space of the army encourages ties that can lead to (homo)sexual contact.
1965	Gioco d'infanzia	Giovanni Comisso	Italy	[Childhood Game] Is the story of Alberto, a world-weary young man, who decides to undertake an oriental journey in search of sensations, delights and events in Sri Lanka and China. A very different version was published, devoid of more blatantly homosexual accents than the one originally written, which was recovered and recently published by Nico Naldini.
1965	Une saison dans la vie d'Emmanuel	Marie-Claire Blais	Canada	[A Season in the Life of Emmanuel] The novel deals with themes of the life and death of Emmanuel's siblings, as well as themes such as that of homosexuality (of Jean le Maigre), incest, and the corrupt life of the monastery. Although conservative values are dominant in this novel, certain progressive ideas such as the individual quest for happiness and independence of spirit point through this Great Darkness. Was adapted for film by director Claude Weisz in 1972.
1965	The Final Programme	Michael Moorcock	UK	Jerry Cornelius is a scientist, a rock star, and an assassin. He is the hippest adventurer of them all: tripping through a pop art nightmare in which kidnappings, murder, sex and drugs are a daily occurrence. Along with his savvy and ruthless partner-in-chaos, Miss Brunner, Cornelius is on a mission to control a revolutionary code for creating the ultimate human being, a modern messiah— the final programme.
1965	The Merry-Go-Round in the Sea	Randolph Stow	Australia	The novel follows the story of a boy, Rob Coram, and his cousin Rick.
1965	Toda la luz del mediodía	Mauricio Wacquez	Chile	[All the midday light] It relates the tension between the narrator and his relationships with his wife and her son, hinting at a homosexual relationship with the latter.
1965	A Sliver of Flesh: Four New Short Stories of the Homosexual Life	"Alexander Goodman" (George Haimsohn)	US	
1965	Carnal Matters: Four Short Stories	"Alexander Goodman" (George Haimsohn)	US	The stories included are: Everybody Loves Charlie (This one concerns a small group of men living in San Francisco), The Battle Between the Poets and the Painters (A story of a poetry club that kind of goes nowhere), Irving (Set in Hawaii, the story concerns gay sailors on shore leave), and, Pictures You’d Be Proud to Show Your Mother (The story is about a man who works in computers. This self-centered man meets a physique photographer and agrees to a posing session for a magazine with another man).
1965	Two People	Donald Windham	US	Published when the word "gay" in its sexual implications was little used or even recognized by heterosexuals. Tells about a love affair in Rome between Forrest, a middle-aged American stockbroker whose wife has left him, and Marcello, a 17-year-old Italian boy. The word "people" in the title is both singular and plural, dealing with two cultures as well as with two individuals.
1965	En octubre no hay milagros	Oswaldo Reynoso	Peru	[There are no miracles in October] The novel unfolds two parallel stories. On the one hand, the story of the Colmenares family and their crisis, which is primarily economic. On the other, the story of Don Manuel, a banker who pulls the strings of power in Peru, and Tito, his lover.
1965	História moderna à moda antiga	Homero Homem	Brazil	[Modern History in an Old-Fashioned Way] One of the short stories included in the collection entitled Carliteana carioca. In the 1973 reissue, the story now appears under the title História moderninha à moda antiga.
1965	Historia de un millón de muchachos: Una generación degenerada	"Paolo Po" (Manuel Aguilar de la Torre)	Mexico	[Story of a Million Boys: A Degenerate Generation] The book shows the problems of a group of young people who, overwhelmed by a sea of falsehoods (religion, politics, philosophy, love, justice, goodness), succumb to it by losing faith in everything.
1966	Paradiso	José Lezama Lima	Cuba	[Paradise] Set during the Cuban Revolution, the novel recounts José Cemí's struggles with a mysterious childhood illness, the death of his father, and the exploration of his homosexuality and literary sensibilities.
1966	El lugar sin límites	José Donoso Yáñez	Chile	[The Place Without Limits] The story centers on “La Manuela”, a homosexual transvestite who owns half of the brothel in a small town known as Estación El Olivo, located near the city of Talca, and on her daughter, the other owner of the brothel, known as “La Japonesita”.
1966	O Físico Prodigioso	Jorge de Sena	Portugal	[The Prodigious Physician] A handsome young doctor from the Middle Ages possessed extraordinary powers granted by the devil, to whom he owes sexual favors, but which is his source of obtaining magical and sexual powers.
1966	Beautiful Losers	Leonard Cohen	Canada	Set in the Canadian province of Quebec, the story of 17th-century Mohawk saint Catherine Tekakwitha is interwoven with a love triangle between an unnamed anglophone Canadian folklorist; his Native wife, Edith, who has committed suicide; and his best friend, the mystical F, a Member of Parliament and a leader in the Quebec separatist movement.
1966	A Queer Kind of Death	George Baxt	US	The novel introduced the detective Pharaoh Love who was the first in the genre to be both black and openly gay.
1966	Child of the Sun	Kyle Onstott and Lance Horner	US	Tells the story of the youth Varius Avitus Bassianus, destined to become Emperor of the Roman empire. Varius spurned women. His erotic longings searched out a very different kind of love.
1966	The Man from C.A.M.P.	"Don Holliday" (Victor J. Banis)	US	The first of a series of ten gay pulp fiction novels who offers the first positive portrayal of a gay secret agent in fiction, Jackie Holmes. Lou Upton pairs Jackie with the U.S. Treasury Department investigator Ted Summers to foil a Los Angeles gang of gays headed by the lesbian Big Daddy.
1966	Color Him Gay	"Don Holliday" (Victor J. Banis)	US	Jackie fights B.U.T.C.H. in Los Angeles and San Francisco, when it seeks to blackmail the closeted British rock superstar Dingo Stark.
1966	The Watercress File	"Don Holliday" (Victor J. Banis)	US	After Jackie and Treasury Agent Rex Winter's initial effort to uncover the international criminal organization Butterfly fails, Jackie is summoned by his Aunt Lily to Washington, D.C., where he teams up with CIA agent Craig Mathews, his aunts and a male cousin to stop an assassination plot.
1966	The Son Goes Down	"Don Holliday" (Victor J. Banis)	US	Working with Irish agent Jerry Shannon to stop a ring kidnapping blond teenage American boys who are fans of the dead actor Dean James, Jackie heads to Tijuana and Lisbon, accompanied by the adopted son of an old friend, a male-to-female transsexual.
1966	Gothic Gaye	"Don Holliday" (Victor J. Banis)	US	After Jackie falls in love with Baron Max von der Gout and leaves C.A.M.P. in order to live with him in the supposedly haunted Castle Gaye, B.U.T.C.H. makes various attempts on his life.
1966	Handsome is…	"Alexander Goodman" (George Haimsohn)	US	This is Goodman's only full-length book. The story concerns a young woman who sets out to find what her boyfriend Tony has been up to. She travels to New York and meets all sorts of shady characters from the gay underworld. As usual in Goodman's work there are elements of the men thinking they're straight, playing gay for a laugh. And the older men are all out for one thing and will stop at nothing to get it.
1966	Mercenary Affections: Stories of the Homosexual Life	"Alexander Goodman" (George Haimsohn)	US	The stories included are: A Murder Story (Some sailors on shore leave get up to some trouble. Concurrently a gay murder across town involving sailors is discovered. These gays don't trust the police and know the killer will likely get off using a gay panic defense), Just Old (A young man has a revealing talk with his grandfather about the older man's gay past), and, The Hoarder (This one involves a young man who gets paid to work around the house and then inside the house. When he later goes missing the police show up to question the man who hired him).
1967	The Wrong People	"Robin Maugham" (Robert Cecil Romer Maugham, 2nd Viscount Maugham)	US	The novel follows Arnold Turner, a repressed English schoolmaster on holiday in Tangier, who gives in to his long-suppressed homosexual desires and subsequently becomes embroiled in a dangerous sex trafficking scheme devised by a wealthy and manipulative American expatriate, Ewing Baird.
1967	Lord Dismiss Us	Michael Campbell	UK	The novel is set in a public school in England in the 1960s. It deals with the love affair between two boys, together with the internal politics of the school itself.
1967	Place d'Armes	Scott Symons	Canada	Contained both autobiographical and metafictional elements; the protagonist Hugh Anderson a wealthy but socially alienated man from Toronto abandoning his comfortable bourgeois life to hole up in a hotel in Montreal, rediscovering himself in sex with male prostitutes in Place d'Armes, and in turn writing his own novel within a novel about Andrew, a character who himself fit the same profile.
1967	The Power of the Dog	Thomas Savage	US	The story deals with bachelor brothers Phil and George, who live on a ranch in Montana, and the events following George's marriage. Phil looks with disdain at George's new wife, Rose, and her son Pete, after which dramatic events begin to unfold.
1967	Swing Low, Sweet Harriet	George Baxt	US	The campy detective Pharaoh Love investigates a thirty-three-year-old murder that still casts a pall over the life of a middle-aged television actress.
1967	Numbers	John Rechy	US	Johnny Rio, a handsome narcissist but no longer a pretty boy, travels to Los Angeles, the site of past sexual conquest and remembered youthful radiance, in a frenzied attempt to recreate his younger self. Johnny has ten precious days to draw the "numbers", the men who will confirm his desirability.
1967	El apuntamiento	Luis Rivano	Chile	[The Aiming] Vinizio Zaneti, a young orphaned grandson of Italian immigrants, faces poverty, loneliness and premature labor, first working in the fields and later as a prostitute. The novel questions poverty, and the difference between worked poverty and underworld poverty.
1967	The Einstein Intersection	Samuel Ray Delany Jr.	US	Far in the extremely far future, village herder & musician Lo Lobey goes on an Orpheus-like quest for his slain lover along the way he meets the very complicated badass Spider, the sweet and nonchalant prince-in-exile Greeneye, the chameleonic object of everyone's desire Dove, and Lobey's terrible nemesis, architect of his quest: the vicious, scheming, mocking, murderous little red-haired psychic child, Kid Death.
1967	Aye, and Gomorrah	Samuel Ray Delany Jr.	US	The short story involves a world where astronauts, known as Spacers, are neutered before puberty to avoid the effects of space radiation on gametes. Aside from making them sterile, the neutering also prevents puberty from occurring and results in androgynous adults whose birth-sex is unclear to others. Spacers are fetishized by a subculture of "frelks", those attracted by the Spacers' supposed unattainability and unarousability.
1967	Holiday Gay	"Don Holliday" (Victor J. Banis)	US	During the Christmas season the Swallows, a gang of midgets under the direction of Birdie Wing, engages in a series of jewel heists before Jackie and an unexpected white-bearded gentleman dressed in a lavender suit stops them cold.
1967	Rally Round the Fag	"Don Holliday" (Victor J. Banis)	US	Jackie is called upon to impersonate a female double agent who has become part of a plot to begin World War III.
1967	The Gay Dogs	"Don Holliday" (Victor J. Banis)	US	A vicious gang under the leadership of the dominatrix Anna Lingus dognaps Lady Agatha's Yorkshire Terrier, causing Jackie chivalrously to go to the rescue.
1967	A Sweet Gentle Boy and Other Stories	"Alexander Goodman" (George Haimsohn)	US	The stories included are: A Sweet, Gentle Boy (A man and his prostitute), The Trip (A man has a plane ride where he imagines all the crew and passengers wanting to have sex with him), Absolutely Creamy (About a new play is being put on in New York City off-off Broadway), The Catch (A man throws an orgy to thank his friends for their support), The Storyteller (Talks about the mechanics of writing a story during the story), and, Dream Boy (Two old queens share gossip about their live-in beaus).
1967	The First Time: Five Short Stories	"Alexander Goodman" (George Haimsohn)	US	
1967	Blaze of Summer	"Alexander Goodman" (George Haimsohn)	US	The stories included are: Blaze of Summer (A small-town teacher with a history of being blackmailed and having to run from town to town for being gay starts a relationship with a local farmhand with devastating consequences), Three Immoral Fables, A Casual Affair (A theatre producer uses a boytoy to get investments for his latest play), and, Joe’s Other Husband (A couple argues in bed one night after one of them gets schooled in the world of S&M with a trick).
1967	Na plaży	"Sydor Rey" (Izydor Reiss)	Poland	[On the beach]
1967	O encontró	Samuel Rawet	Brazil	[The Meeting] One of the short stories included in the collection entitled Os sete sonhos. Two men attempting to reconcile end up in a fatal physical altercation. The story, tinged with negative or somber tones, alludes—very briefly—to something related to sexual attraction or love.
1967	O seu minuto de Glória	Samuel Rawet	Brazil	[Your Minute of Glory] One of the short stories included in the collection entitled Os sete sonhos. The narrator seems to use an everyday element, like preparing coffee, to reach something deeper. While revealing his homosexuality, he also presents a vision of man as a puppet capable of dreaming, revealing the human being as a fragmented entity.
1967	O iniciado do vento	Aníbal Machado	Brazil	[The Wind Initiate; or, The Boy and the Wind] This story recounts the misadventures of José María, a civil servant who sublimely absorbed his loneliness, his lack of interaction with women, and his isolation through his dedication to his work. Upon retiring, after unsuccessful attempts to finally “live life”, he decides to search for the young man who perhaps gave him the only good thing in his life. The movie O Menino e o Vento by Carlos Hugo Christensen was loosely based on the book.
1968	Tell Me How Long the Train's Been Gone	James Baldwin	US	A retrospective examination of the life and relationships of a bisexual black man from Harlem.
1968	Die Palette	Hubert Fichte	Germany	[The Pallet] The novel tells the story of The Pallet, a pub that was located in the Neustadt district of Hamburg and existed until 1964, which was visited by thieves, con men, bohemians, dock workers, prostitutes, lesbians, and gays.
1968	Street of Stairs	Ronald Tavel	US	It is a pederastic and polyphonic novel that follows the life of Mark, an expatriate in Tangier, Morocco, who falls in love with Hamid, a thief.
1968	Topsy and Evil	George Baxt	US	Satan Stagg, a young Black detective a trainee of Pharaoh Love, investigates the baffling murder of Guru Raskalnikov, a wealthy tycoon.
1968	Los señores vencen	Pedro Jorge Vera Vera	Ecuador	[The Lords Win] In this short story, a young homosexual who commits suicide leaves a letter to his father.
1968	Blow the Man Down	"Don Holliday" (Victor J. Banis)	US	When Atlantic ships start disappearing just before a Summit Cruise, Lou Upton calls on Jackie and U.S. Agent Andy Parks for help; they are sucked into the domed city of Atlantis.
1968	Happyland and Other Stories	"Alexander Goodman" (George Haimsohn)	US	The stories included are: Ink (A Twilight-Zone style story. Four young men appear naked in a white room with no doors and no walls), Two Immoral Fables (1. The Knight; and, 2. The Princess), and, Happyland (The owner of an amusement park called Happyland is being blackmailed for his homosexual sins).
1968	Sandel	Angus Stewart	UK	Set in the pseudonymous St Cecilia's College, Oxford, the book revolves around the unorthodox love between a 19-year-old undergraduate, David Rogers, and a 13-year-old chorister, Antony Sandel. The novel appears to have been based on real events, recounted by Stewart in an article under the pseudonym John Davis in the anthology Underdogs (1961), edited for Weidenfeld & Nicolson by Philip Toynbee.
1968	Les Américains	Roger Peyrefitte	France	[The Americans] It follows the adventures of John Montague, a sociology major who travels across the United States, providing a broad portrait of the 1960s in all its diversity through the characters he meets. Among these people, the topic of homosexuality is touched upon twice: when he meets his friend Carl and Jason, the young runaway son of a tyrannical billionaire. This gives them the opportunity to discuss sexual freedom and the place of homosexuality and Black people in American society. And the other, when one afternoon he is invited to Kenneth Anger's house with his friend Jim, giving him the opportunity to review the laws regarding homosexuality in each American state. The author traveled to the United States from late May to early August 1967 to research and develop the plot for his novel.
1968	Con Jimmy en Paracas	Alfredo Bryce Echenique	Peru	[With Jimmy in Paracas] One of the short stories included in the collection entitled Huerto cerrado. Manolo is the protagonist of all the stories in this book. In this story, Manolo goes with his father to Paracas, where he stays in a hotel where he runs into Jimmy, a schoolmate who appears to be the son of one of his father's bosses. After spending the day with him, Manolo wonders if Jimmy is gay.
1968	O sexo portátil	Luiz Canabrava	Brazil	[Portable Sex] The story, told through a first-person narrator, recounts the life of Camilo Saroval. The protagonist is a young man from the fictional city of Mata da Corda, tormented since childhood by his fears (of others, of hell, of loneliness, of not fitting in, of death, etc.) and by the difficulty of understanding his sexuality as he realizes that it deviates from “masculine behavior”.
1968	Aprendizado	Luiz Canabrava	Brazil	[Finding Out] Short story about a teenager named Tulio who becomes sexually involved with an older man.
1968	Los inestables	"Alberto X. Teruel" (Octavio Augusto Barona Chambón)	Mexico	[The Unstable Ones] The novel explores the experiences of different loves and the fragility of the couple relationships of the protagonist, Teruel, a teenager who reaches his young adulthood narrating his experiences within the homosexual circles of the time and the rituals of this era.
1969	Printemps au parking	Christiane Rochefort	France	[Spring at the Parking Lot] The runaway anarchist teenager, Christophe, left to himself in Paris for a few days, the time to meet girls, hoodlums and above all an affection for a young journalist, Thomas, who introduces him to politics, to love and to a hitherto unknown pleasure.
1969*	Les Garçons	Henry de Montherlant	France	[The Boys] Tells the story of 16-year-old philosophy student André Sevrais-Alban de Bricoule, who in his last year has a younger one under his control, he has 14-year-old Serge Souplier. A teenage love has been forged between them, but the Abbé de Pradts is also secretly in love with Souplier, and Alban is therefore a rival to be eliminated. The author is based on when he was expelled from the Institution Notre-Dame de Sainte-Croix in Neuilly for a relationship with a younger comrade, Philippe Jean Giquel. The novel was written between four and five decades before its publication.
1969	Después de todo	José Ceballos Maldonado	Mexico	[After All] Tells the story of Javier Lavalle, a homosexual man -young and brilliant university professor- who accepts himself as such without fear and who takes his choice of life to the last consequences.
1969	Fire from Heaven	"Mary Renault" (Eileen Mary Challans)	UK	Is about the childhood and youth of Alexander the Great. The novel deals with the relationship between Philip and Queen Olympias and Alexander's changing loyalties to them, his tuition under Aristotle, and his sexuality and relationship with his friend and future General Hephaistion, and Alexander's growing prowess as a soldier during his father's conquest of the Greek states.
1969	I'll Get There. It Better Be Worth the Trip	John Donovan	US	Tells the story of Davy Ross, a lonely boy who becomes close friends with a male classmate at his new school. The friendship later turns sexual, eventually causing Davy to struggle with feelings of guilt. It was one of the first mainstream teen novels to deal with homosexuality.
1969	Nuevas Lilianas	Eugenia Viteri Segura	Ecuador	[New Lilianas] Tells the story of the marriage of a woman with a man who soon turns out to be an abusive sadist, who married her with the sole intention of hiding his homosexuality.
1969	Spartan Planet	Arthur Bertram Chandler	UK	A planet colonized by Earthlings long ago, it had become an all-male planet based partially on the militaristic, male-dominated city-state Sparta of ancient Greece. The book hits on an interesting undertone of homosexuality, these inhabitants are raised in a culture where sexuality is expressed by males toward males.
1969	Trágame tierra	Lizandro Chávez Alfaro	Nicaragua	[Swallow Me Earth] A novel that reflects the homophobia that existed at the time, as well as a more complex view of sexual orientation and gender identity. Marcelo Barrantes is disappointed with the youngest of his eight children, César, whom he suspects is homosexual. César befriends Víctor, a local transvestite known as Viqui, whom Marcelo begins to despise because of his closeness to his son.
1969	Conversación en La Catedral	Mario Vargas Llosa	Peru	[Conversation in The Cathedral] Set in Peru under the dictatorship of General Manuel A. Odría. The protagonist, Santiago Zavala, is a young man from a wealthy family who studies at the University of San Marcos, then one of the core groups of the student opposition that confronted the dictatorship. His father, Don Fermín Zavala, is a successful businessman who makes very profitable businesses benefiting from government corruption, but there is something that torments him inside, the secret of his homosexuality, and that is that he has sexual encounters with his chaffeur Ambrosio.
1969	Cicada	Lin Hwai-min	Taiwan	A collection of stories that follows the lives the lives of several college students living in Ximending, Taipei, who explore and struggle with expressing homosexual desires for each other.
1969	A Sky Full of Bright, Twinkling Stars	Pai Hsien-yung	Taiwan	One of the short stories included in the collection entitled Taipei People. This is a story about (gay) street characters who frequent Taipei's New Park—The Guru, Ah Hsiung the Primitive, Dark-and-Handsome, Little Jade—concludes with a potent symbol of how very different people (and peoples) are thrown into each other's arms.
1969	The Season of the Witch	James Leo Herlihy	US	The story is written in the form of a journal that spans three months in the life of teenage runaway Gloria Glyczwycz, who decides to run away from home with her gay friend John McFadden. The novel explores casual drug use, draft evasion, homosexuality, and incest. Perhaps the last gay novel published before the Stonewall riots.

== See also ==
- Gay literature
- List of LGBT-themed speculative fiction
- Lists of LGBT figures in fiction and myth
- List of lesbian fiction
- Lost Gay Novels

== Bibliography ==
- Gunn, Drewey Wayne (2016). Gay American Novels, 1870–1970: A Reader's Guide. McFarland. pp. 79–80. ISBN 978-1-4766-2522-5.
