= Nino Cesarini =

Italian model (1889–1943)

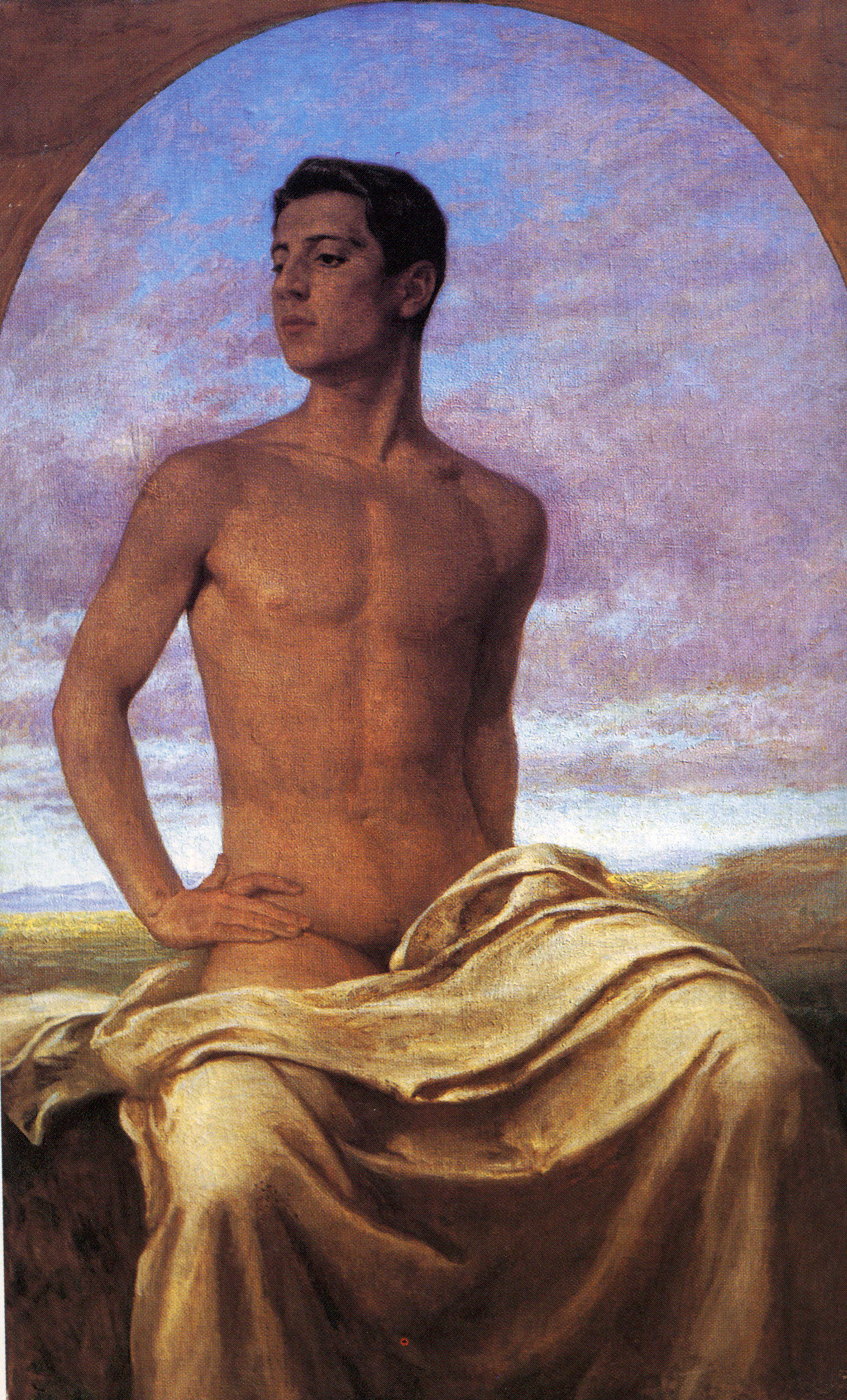
- Portrait of Cesarini by Paul Hoecker
- Born: Antonio Cesarini; 30 September 1889; Rome, Italy
- Died: 24 October 1943 (aged 54); Rome, Italy
- Partner: Jacques d'Adelswärd-Fersen (1880–1923)

Antonio Cesarini (Rome, Italy, 30 September 1889 – 24 October 1943), better known by the diminutive name Nino, was a model for several artists, such as the photographer Wilhelm von Plüschow, painters Paul Hoecker and Umberto Brunelleschi and sculptor Francesco Jerace during his youth. In his adulthood he modelled for Vincenzo Gemito, who presented him as a prototype of homoerotic masculine beauty. He was also known for his relationship with Baron Jacques d'Adelswärd-Fersen. His life was novelized by the French writer Roger Peyrefitte in his work The Exile of Capri (L'exilé de Capri) in 1959.

== Biography ==
=== Childhood and teenage years ===
Cesarini was born into a working-class family in 1889. According to Peyreffite, Baron Jacques d'Adelswärd-Fersen, who had been forced to leave Paris after a homosexual scandal, met him in Rome on 9 July 1904, when Cesarini was a fourteen-year-old construction worker and newspaper-seller. D'Adelswärd-Fersen obtained authorization from the boy's family to take Cesarini as his secretary with him to Capri. They lived together in Villa Lysis. In order to immortalize his beauty, the Baron commissioned several artists to depict Cesarini. One of them was Umberto Brunelleschi, an Italian painter; another was the German painter Paul Hoecker, also exiled in Italy for the same (sexual) motives as those of d'Adelswärd-Fersen. Finally, d'Adelswärd-Fersen commissioned the famous sculptor Francesco Jerace to cast a statue of Cesarini in bronze, and placed it in the garden of the villa towards the sea. It was also repeatedly photographed by Wilhelm von Plüschow, dressed as a Roman emperor and as a Christian saint. Copies of these photographs were widely circulated and it is possible that even d'Adelswärd-Fersen sold them commercially. The only image of Cesarini's statue by Jerace is von Plüschow's photograph.

In 1907, d'Adelswärd-Fersen dedicated his work Une Jeunesse / Les Baiser de Narcisse to Cesarini, with the following phrase: "Dedicated to N. C. More beautiful than the light of Rome."

Cesarini's beauty made him attractive to other people. During the visit to Venice, he flirted with Alexandrine (Sacha) Ricoy Antokolsky, the daughter of the sculptor Mark Antokolsky, who even travelled back to Capri and finally managed to seduce him. D'Adelswärd-Fersen reacted furiously with a volume of poems appropriately titled "So sang Marsyas" – an exalted song of praise for Cesarini, since he was frightened by the thought that Cesarini would abandon him. It was suggested that this explosion of passion was motivated by d'Adelswärd-Fersen's fear of 'losing' Nino, and the jealousy that fuelled such fear.

The Italian poet and writer Ada Negri, who had visited the Villa Lysis, published an article in 1923 in the newspaper L'Ambrosiano, shortly after the death of the Baron, describing Cesarini as follows: "The Villa was a place where everything was very beautiful, including Nino, the secretary, with the intense gaze of deep black eyes, crowned by well-shaped eyebrows." At that time, d'Adelswärd-Fersen was in a phase of great dependence on opium, a drug of which he smoked more than thirty pipes a day. According to Peyrefitte, d'Adelswärd-Fersen had built a special smoking room in Villa Lysis, called the China Room.

=== Later years ===
Will Ogrinc suggests in his work that as Cesarini matured, d'Adelswärd-Fersen pursued relationships with other young boys. He cites Plüschow's famous photograph as evidence, which shows a naked young man lying on a sofa inside Villa Lysis. On one of the walls, Hoecker's renowned painting, celebrating Cesarini's beauty, is visible. Ogrinc asserts that the naked boy on the couch is not Cesarini, as he appears too young compared to the subject in the painting.

Cesarini and d'Adelswärd-Fersen travelled, at least a few times, to countries in the Far East. Apart from some temporary separations, for example during Cesarini's military service and his participation in the First World War, which was followed by a convalescence in hospital due to the injuries he sustained there, Cesarini remained with d'Adelswärd-Fersen until the latter's death despite the fact that, over time, passion was replaced by friendship. According to Roger Peyrefitte, when Cesarini returned from hospital he remained with d'Adelswärd-Fersen only as a friend and secretary, and d'Adelswärd-Fersen's attempts to continue the sexual relationship were rejected by the then-mature Cesarini. By contrast, Ogrinc asserts that this view of Peyrefitte's, apart from not being documented, does not seem realistic, given the preference shown by d'Adelswärd-Fersen for younger boys.

D'Adelswärd-Fersen died in 1923 from an overdose of cocaine dissolved in a glass of champagne. There are suggestions that d'Adelswärd-Fersen's death may have been suicide, although there has been no unanimity in that explanation. Dr Gatti, the doctor who signed d'Adelswärd-Fersen's death certificate, declared a heart attack as the cause of death. This was not inconsistent with an overdose of cocaine.

Trying to protect the inheritance, the Baron's family spread the rumour that he had been poisoned by Cesarini, driven by jealousy at the last relationship that d'Adelswärd-Fersen maintained with the actor Corrado Annicelli. D'Adelswärd-Fersen's sister and mother insisted on an autopsy. The Neapolitan authorities decided to carry it out, after which they dismissed such accusations.

According to the wishes of the late d'Adelswärd-Fersen, Cesarini received 300,000 francs and the right to the usufruct of the Villa Lysis. He later sold his rights to the Villa to d'Adelswärd-Fersen's sister for 200,000 lire. His portrait painted by Brunelleschi and the statue of Jerace were, in turn, sold to a Swiss antiquary, and have since disappeared.

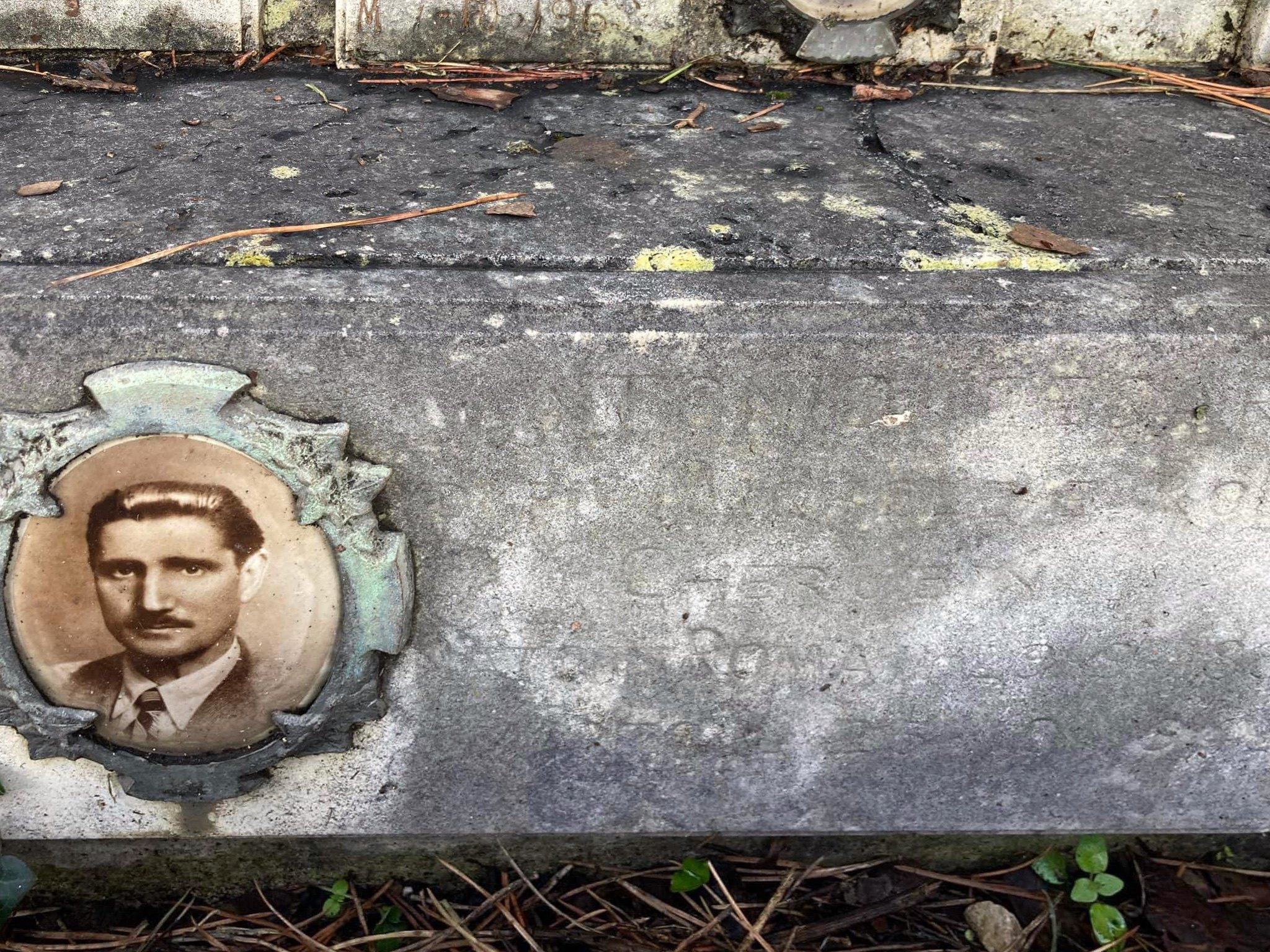
Nino Cesarini Grave

One account of his later life states that Cesarini returned to Rome and established a newsstand and bar. Cesarini died in October 1943 at age 54, and was buried in the Roman cemetery of Campo Verano. However, other sources claim that after the sale of his rights to the Villa, together with the inheritance he received, Cesarini was rich enough to retire, as well as cultured and refined (he apparently spoke several languages), which makes it difficult to understand why he decided to sell newspapers in a kiosk. According to this other version, he died of an opium overdose. After his death, his family destroyed all the letters from d'Adelswärd-Fersen, many of his photos and a collection of erotic objects.

== Gallery ==
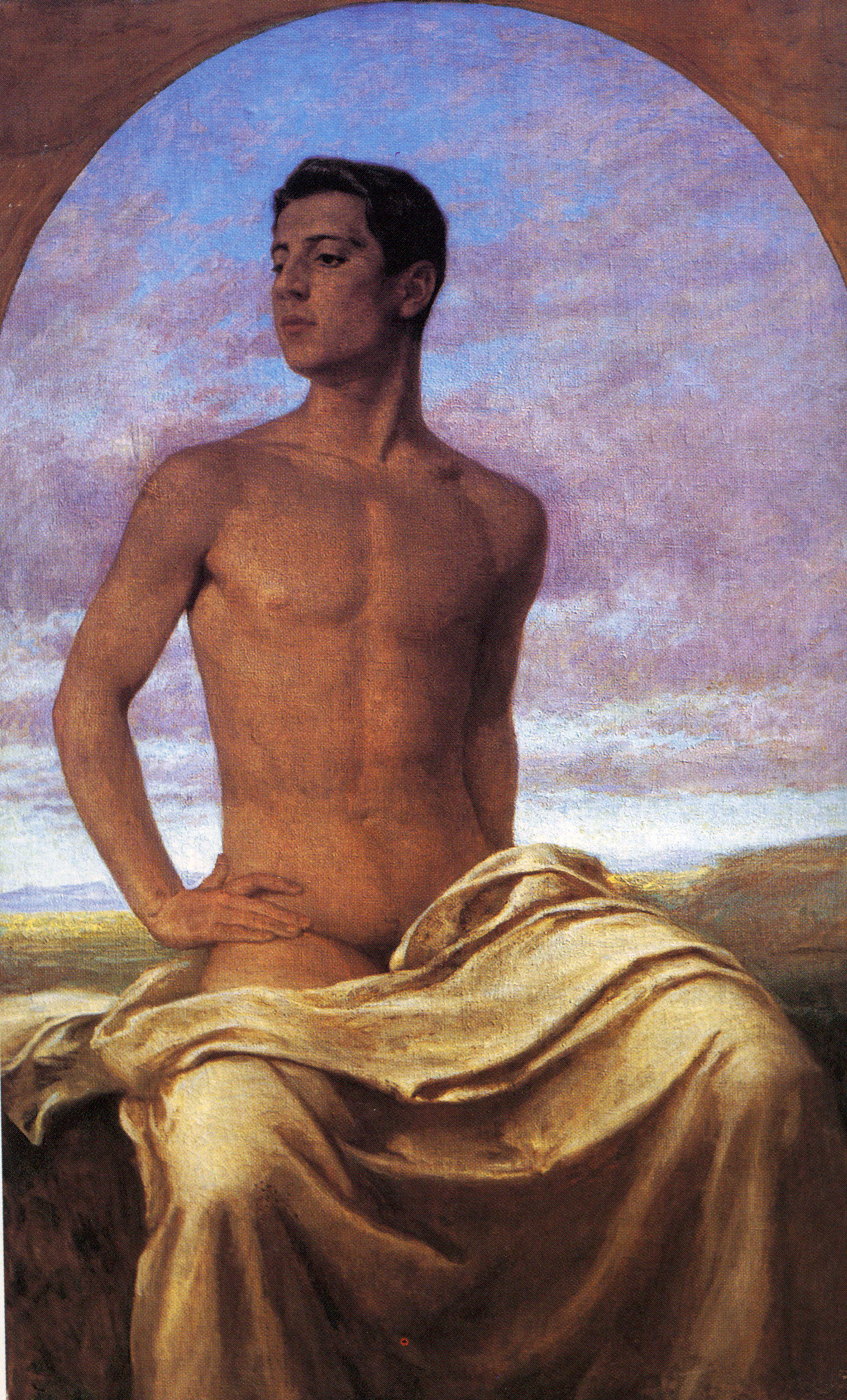
Paul Hoecker, Nino, 1908, oil on canvas, 156 x 98 cm. Private collection.

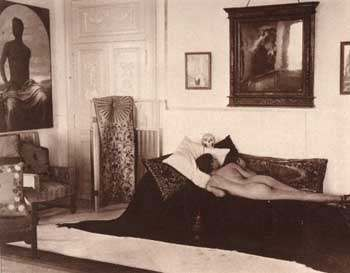
Naked youth poses prone in the Villa Lysis of Capri, where Nino Cesarini lived with his protector and lover, the Baron Jacques d'Adelswärd-Fersen. The photograph was taken by Wilhelm von Plüschow and the portrait of Cesarini is visible on the wall.

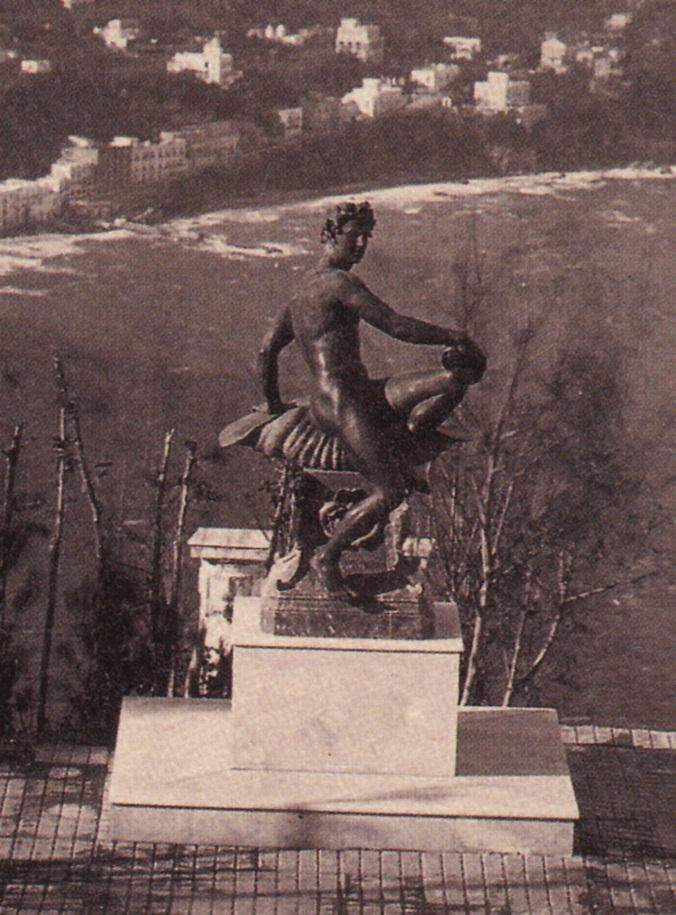
Statue of Nino Cesarini by Francesco Jerace for the garden of Villa Lysis, commissioned by Baron Jacques d'Adelswärd-Fersen. The photograph was made by Wilhelm von Plüschow.

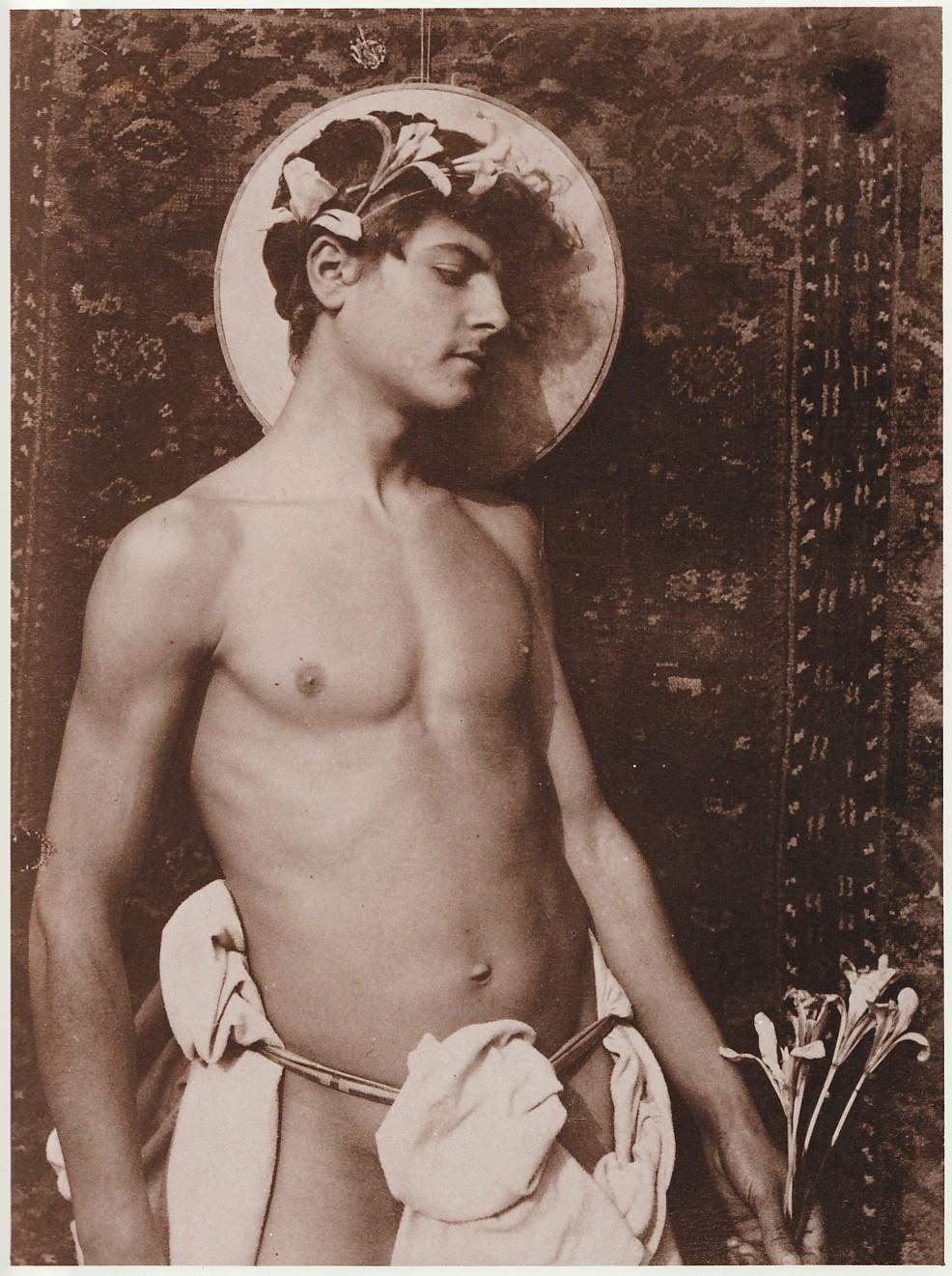
Portrait of a young martyr by Wilhelm von Plüschow.
