= Villa Lysis =

Building in Capri, Italy

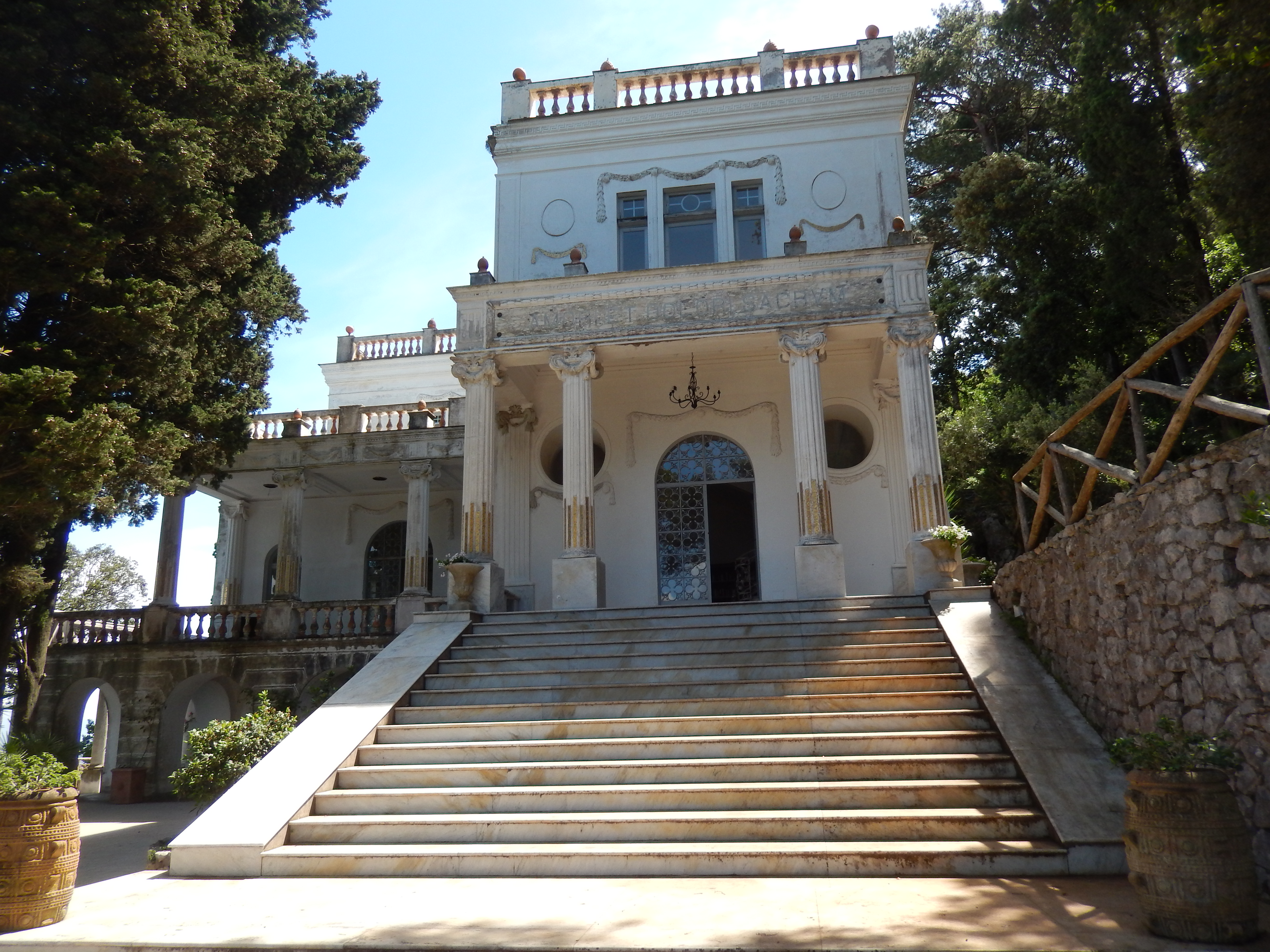
- Interactive map of the Villa Lysis area
- Former names: La Gloriette
- Alternative names: Villa Fersen

General information
- Architectural style: Art Nouveau, Neoclassical
- Location: Capri, Italy
- Coordinates: 40°33′33″N 14°15′35″E
- Elevation: about 200 m (656 ft)
- Completed: 1905
- Renovated: 1990s
- Client: Jacques d'Adelswärd-Fersen
- Owner: Municipality of Capri

Technical details
- Floor count: 3
- Floor area: 450 m²

Design and construction
- Architect: Marcello Quiriconi (renovation)

Villa Lysis (initially, La Gloriette; today, Villa Fersen) is a villa on Capri built by industrialist and poet Jacques d'Adelswärd-Fersen in 1905. "Dedicated to the youth of love" (dédiée à la jeunesse d'amour), it was Fersen's self-chosen exile from France after a sex scandal involving Parisian schoolboys and nude (or nearly nude) tableaux vivants.

== History ==
=== Construction and early years ===
Fersen purchased the 12,000 square metres (130,000 sq ft) plot in 1904 for 15,000 lire from the Salvia family. The villa's designer is unknown; for many years it was believed that French artist Edouard Chimot had designed the structure (due to his involvement in a trial following an accident at the construction site); however, a recent analysis of letters from Jacques d'Adelswärd-Fersen to Chimot shows that Chimot did not perform that design. The garden around the villa was designed by Mimi Ruggiero, who planted the laurel and myrtle in honor of Venus The house was described in detail by Roger Peyrefitte in his novel The Exile of Capri (1959), a fictionalized account of Adelswärd-Fersen's years on Capri together with his lover Nino Cesarini.

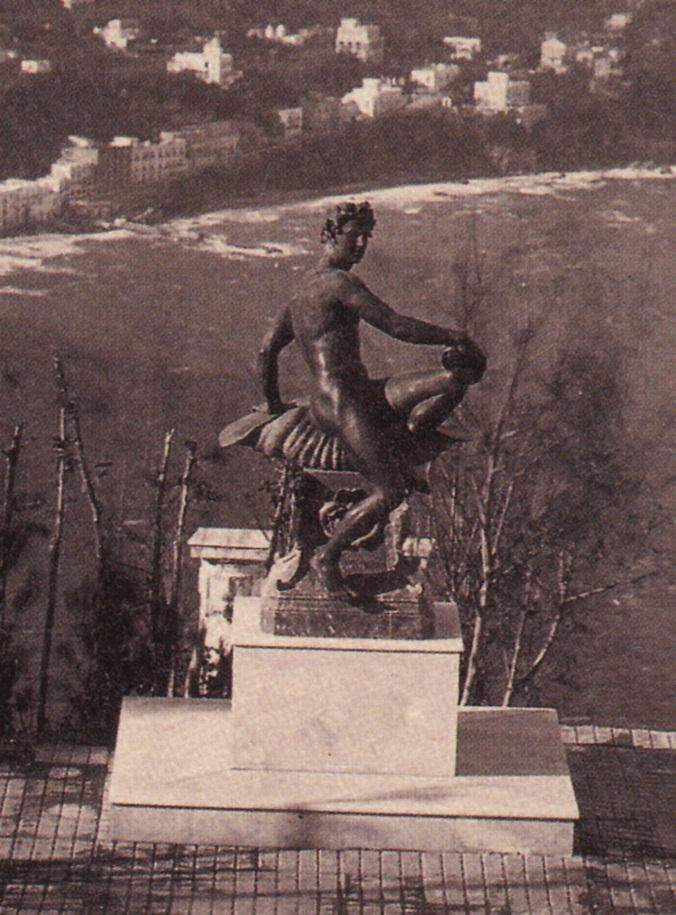
Garden sculpture at Villa Lysis

Fersen became addicted to opium on a trip to Ceylon during construction of the house (Peyrefitte relates that a worker was killed during construction, and Fersen decided to travel until the local anger at him had subsided) and after World War I he started using cocaine. He eventually committed suicide in 1923 by ingesting an overdose of cocaine. After Fersen's death, the villa was left first to his sister Germaine, but with the usufruct left to Nino Cesarini. Cesarini sold the rights for 200,000 lire to Germaine and went to live in Rome. Germaine later gave the villa to her daughter, the Countess of Castelbianco. The Countess sold the villa to the millionaire Felix Mechoulan.

=== Later years ===
Maintenance and upkeep of the villa ceased after 1934, so the house was essentially in ruins by the 1980s. In 1989, the Italian Ministry for Cultural Heritage decreed the building a historical monument. The building was restored in the 1990s by the Lysis Funds Association (founded in 1986 by Neapolitan gallery owner Lucio Amelio) and the Municipality of Capri. Tuscan architect Marcello Quiriconi and Jacques Fersen biographer Roger Peyrefitte supervised the work. All the stucco decorations were restored by Capri artist Antonio Senesi, grandson of the Senesi who decorated the villa during its original construction. In 1995, the Mechoulan family sold the villa to the lawyer Manfredonia, who resold it in 1998 to an American businessman of Italian descent Armando Campione, who never lived in the villa, dying in a hit-and-run accident in Tahiti soon after purchase. The villa was finally purchased by the Municipality of Capri in January 2001. Since the restoration, Villa Lysis has been open to tourists. It may be rented for special occasions, and cultural events have taken place there, such as an exhibition of photographs by Wilhelm von Gloeden in 2009. In March 2010, the villa was put up for sale, listed as being 450 square metres (4,800 sq ft) with a

12,000 square metres (130,000 sq ft) garden.

== Architecture and fittings ==
Architecturally, the house is mainly Art Nouveau with Neoclassical elements; the style might be called "Neoclassical decadent." The well-known Latin inscription above the front steps (AMORI ET DOLORI SACRVM, "a shrine to love and sorrow") highlights Fersen's Romantic view of himself. The inscription was placed on the northeastern corner of the wall by Nino Cesarini. "Lysis" is a reference to the Socratic dialogue Lysis discussing friendship, and by our modern notion, homosexual love.

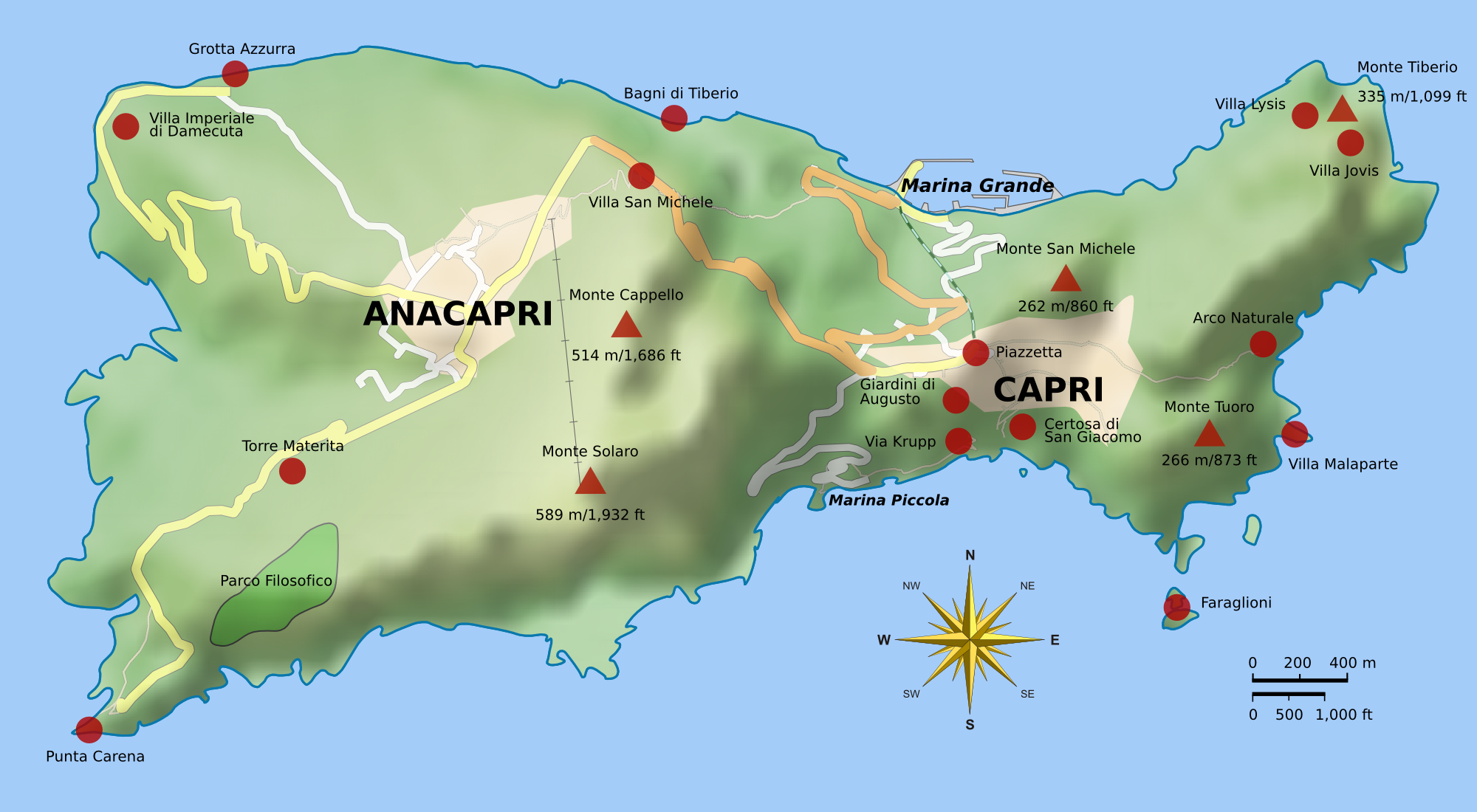
Map of Capri with Villa Lysis in the north-east corner of the island

In the atrium, a marble stairway, with wrought iron balustrade, leads to the first floor where there are bedrooms with panoramic terraces, and a dining room. Fersen's large room was on the upper floor, facing East, with three windows overlooking the Gulf of Naples and three towards Mount Tiberio. Nino also had a room on the upper floor. On the ground floor there is a lounge decorated with blue majolica and white ceramic, facing out over the Gulf of Naples. In the basement, there is a room for smoking opium, also known as the Chinese room.

== Grounds ==
The large garden is connected to the villa by a flight of steps which leads to a portico with ionic columns. The ruins of Villa Jovis, one of Tiberius' twelve villas on Capri, are a few hundred metres to the east-southeast of Villa Lysis.

== Gallery ==
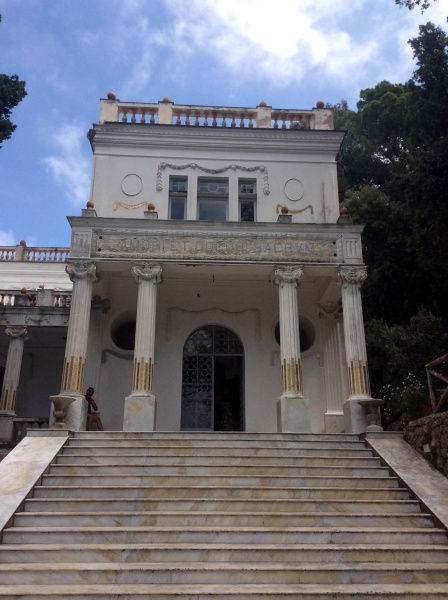
Façade of Villa Lysis

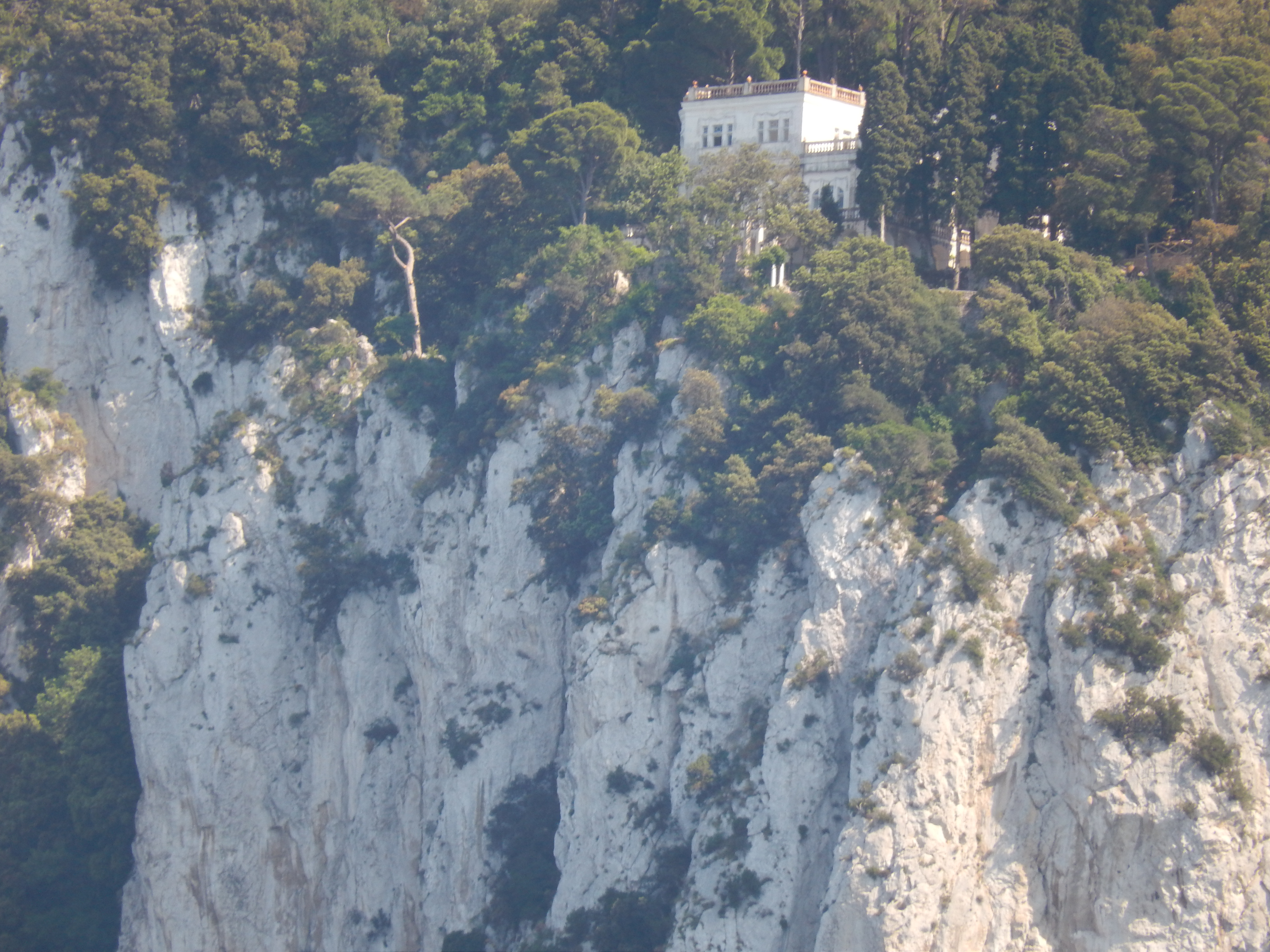
Villa Lysis on the Cliff

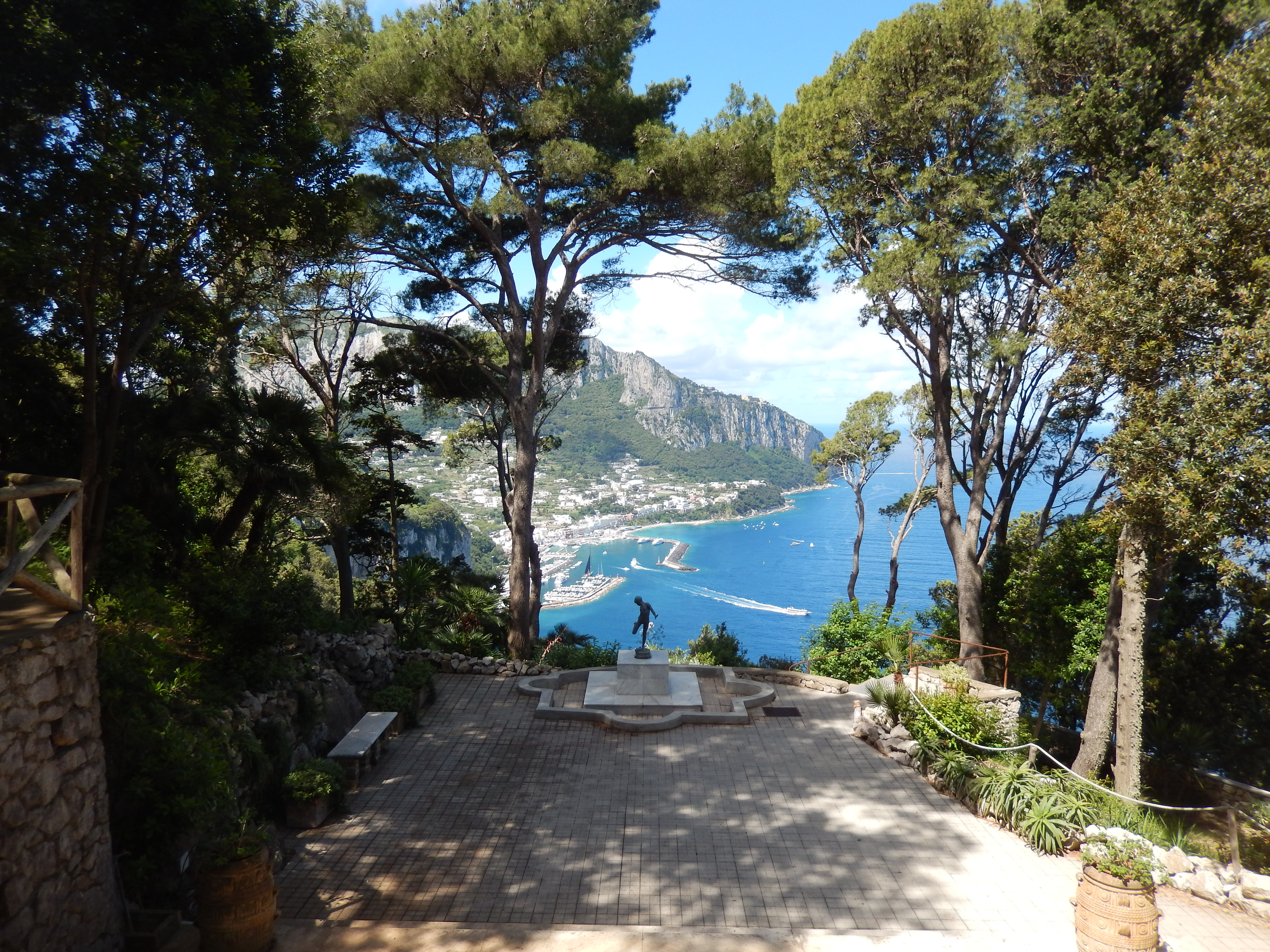
The view of Capri from the front porch

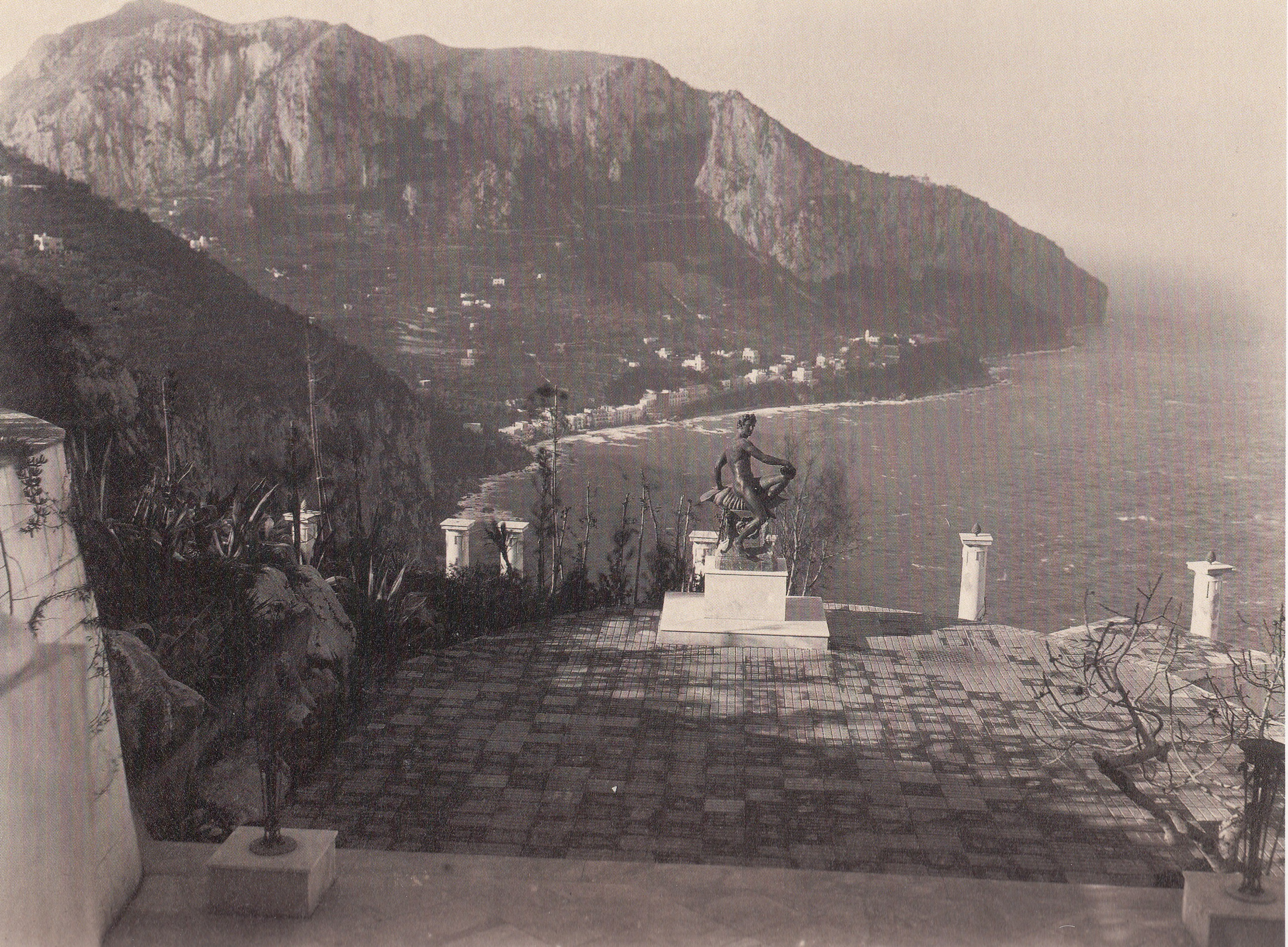
Villa Lysis, Wilhelm von Plüschow

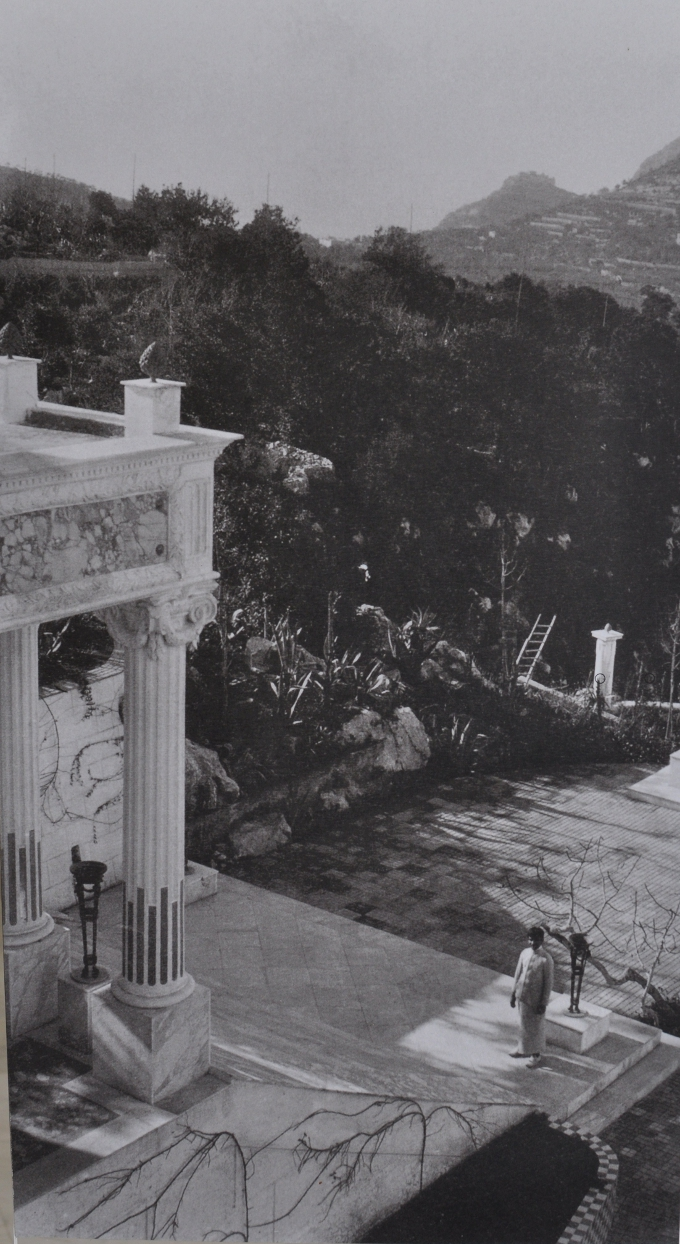
Villa Lysis, Wilhelm von Plüschow

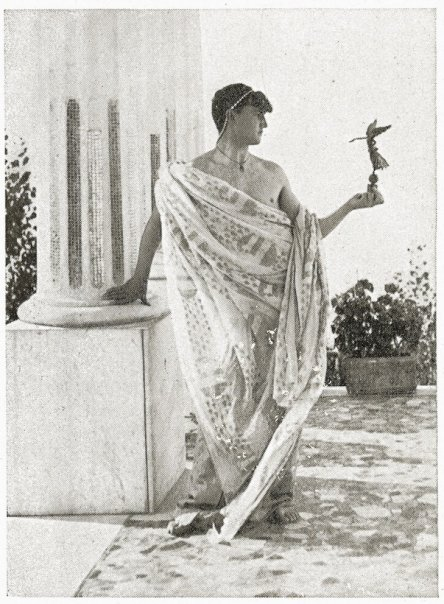
Nino Cesarini posing by the column of Villa Lysis

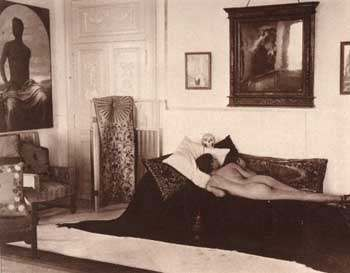
Interior of Villa Lysis, Nino Cesarini reclining under his own portrait painted by Paul Hoecer, Wilhelm von Plüschow
