= Jacques d'Adelswärd-Fersen =

French writer and poet (1880–1923)

Baron Jacques d'Adelswärd-Fersen
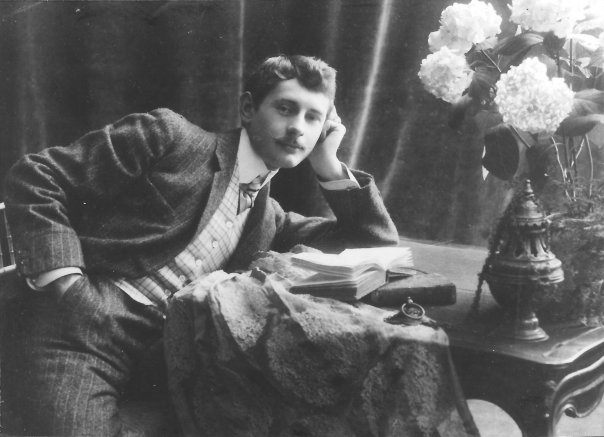
- D'Adelswärd-Fersen in 1905
- Born: 20 February 1880; Paris, France
- Died: 5 November 1923 (aged 43); Capri, Kingdom of Italy
- Resting place: Cimitero acattolico ("Non-Roman-Catholic cemetery"), Capri; 40.5514°N 14.2345°E
- Occupations: Writer and poet
- Known for: Lord Lyllian; Akademos; Being the subject of Roger Peyrefitte's novel L'Exilé de Capri
- Partner(s): Nino Cesarini; Corrado Annicelli
- Parents: Axel d'Adelswärd (father); Louise-Emilie Alexandrine d'Adelswärd (née Vührer) (mother)

Baron Jacques d'Adelswärd-Fersen (20 February 1880 – 5 November 1923) was a French novelist and poet. His life forms the basis of a fictionalised 1959 novel by Roger Peyrefitte entitled The Exile of Capri (L'exilé de Capri).

In 1903, a scandal involving school pupils made d'Adelswärd persona non grata in the salons of Paris and dashed his marriage plans. For much of the rest of his life, he took up residence on Capri in self-imposed exile with his long-time lover, Nino Cesarini. He became a "character" on the island in the inter-war years, featuring in novels by Compton MacKenzie and others. His house, Villa Lysis, remains one of Capri's tourist attractions.

== Early life ==
He was born in Paris, France as Jacques d'Adelswärd on 20 February 1880, son of Axel d'Adelswärd and Louise-Emilie Alexandrine d'Adelswärd (née Vührer; 1855–1935), who came from a Catholic Alsatian family. As he was related on his paternal side to Axel von Fersen, a Swedish count who had had a supposed relationship with Marie Antoinette, d'Adelswärd took on the name Fersen later in his life to advertise his link with his distant relative. On his father's side his family can be traced back to Baron Göran Axel Adelswärd, a Swedish officer and courtier who was captured by the French in 1806 and imprisoned in Longwy. There, he married Anne Catherine Honorine Bernard, daughter of a French notary. D'Adelswärd's grandfather, Renauld-Oscar (1811–1898), became a naturalized French citizen in 1832 and married Amélie Steiner in 1843. After serving in the army, he founded the steel industry in Longwy-Briey. D'Adelswärd's maternal grandfather, Thomas Michel Alexandre Vührer (1817–1886), was a referendary at the French Ministry of State, director of Le Paris-Journal as well as founder of the Parisian newspaper Le Soir. D'Adelswärd's father, Axel d'Adelswärd, died from fever in Panama when Jacques was seven years old. He was assigned a guardian, Viscount Elie Marie Audoin de Dampierre (1846–1909), who was a friend of the family. During d'Adelswärd's teenage years, the family spent long summer vacations at his grandfather's estate on Jersey, where d'Adelswärd reportedly had an intimate encounter with a blond Eton schoolboy. He went to school in Paris and studied briefly there at the École libre des sciences politiques, and afterward at the University of Geneva.

In 1897, d'Adelswärd visited Capri and other parts of Italy with his mother. The family steel furnaces had become profitable enough to make d'Adelswärd a rich and 'eligible' bachelor when he inherited at the age of 22. Apart from joining the military, he traveled extensively and settled down as a writer. He published Chansons légères (1900) and Hymnaire d'Adonis (1902), and other poems and novels. In 1902, he holidayed in Venice, where he associated with the novelist Jean Lorrain. On his return to Paris, he published a novel, Notre Dame des mers mortes.

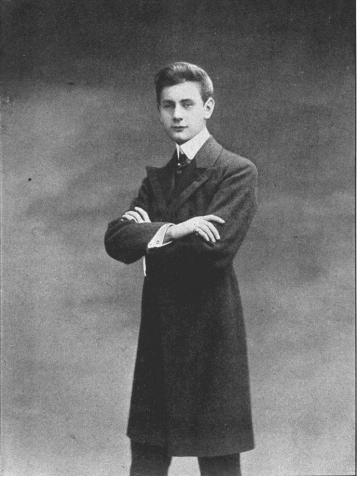
Jacques d'Adelswärd-Fersen in his teen years

== "Messes noires" scandal ==
In 1903, d'Adelswärd and his friend, Albert François (Hamelin) de Warren (1881–1928), brother of René de Warren, were rumoured to be holding "entertainments" – tableaux vivants of pupils from the best Parisian schools – in his house at 18 Avenue de Friedland. One of the first alleged "victims" was Eduardo (Bruno) de Warren (1886–1957), brother of Hamelin. D'Adelswärd and Hamelin were arrested on charges of inciting minors to commit debauchery. D'Adelswärd was arrested on 9 July by Octave Hamard, chief of the Paris police, and his deputy Blot by order of Charles de Valles, pretrial judge. The order stated the suspicion of indecent behaviour with minors and offending public decency. He was brought to La Santé Prison after arrest. The newspapers and magazines published alleged details of d'Adelswärd's and Hamelin's orgies, which they called messes noires (Black Masses), in their homes twice a week, with youngsters from the upper classes, mostly recruited from the Lycée Carnot and the Chaptal, Condorcet, Janson-deSailly, and Saint-Joseph-des-Tuileries schools.

According to Peyrefitte, the scandal started with a failed blackmail attempt by d'Adelswärd's former servant, demanding 100,000 francs in return for his silence. D'Adelswärd's mother refused to pay, so he went to the police. At the beginning, the police dismissed the allegations. But the story was later confirmed by another arrested blackmailer who was an intimate acquaintance of Albert François de Warren. Will Ogrinc reported that, after investigating the French National Archives in 2003, he did not come across any documents about the failed blackmail attempt by d'Adelswärd's former valet and that it was probably invented by Peyrefitte. In the court documents, the valet, whose name was Velpry, told investigators about the periodic visits of the Croisé de Pourcelet brothers to d'Adelswärd's apartment and that, after one of their visits, he had found obscene photos and handkerchiefs stained with semen on the table. He also claimed that he had let d'Adelswärd's mother know about it and quit his job. Some documents mention that d'Adelswärd was blackmailed by several rent boys with whom he had relations. The dossier mentions the names of six rent boys: Beret, Boscher, twenty-one-year-old Kothé, Lefebvre, nineteen-year-old Leroy, and fifteen-year-old Verguet, though there is no mention as to which of them might have been the blackmailer.

Police started to watch some of the schoolboys, which at first sight confirmed the allegations. Hamelin fled to the United States on 27 June 1903, but d'Adelswärd was arrested. His aunt Jeanne d'Adelswärd and former guardian Viscount Audoin de Dampierre employed Edgar Demange, a lawyer who previously defended Alfred Dreyfus, in his defence.

=== Trial ===
The trial started on 28 November 1903 in the Seine Tribunal. It was presided over by Judge Bondoux. It was a closed trial with the public barred from the hearings. Some schoolboys testified for the prosecution. The defence tried to prove d'Adelswärd's heterosexuality by making him testify about his encounters with women. D'Adelswärd and de Warren were found guilty, but having been in prison for five months already d'Adelswärd was set free immediately after the trial. He was also fined 50 francs and lost civil rights for five years. Hamelin stayed in prison and appealed his sentence to a higher court. The "entertainments" had been attended by the cream of Parisian society, including some Catholic priests and the writer Achille Essebac. This could be a factor which may have induced the court to drop some charges. According to Will Ogrinc, the court limited the case to "inciting minors to debauchery" because of illegal conduct between boys and two young men in their twenties, preventing implications against older participants. Many boys did not appear at the interrogations and trial, since they had been sent to the countryside by their parents to avoid embarrassing revelations.

There is no detailed description of the boys' testimony, but Peyrefitte writes of Jean Lorrain's report that, after the tableaux vivants, d'Adelswärd followed the boys who had been stimulated by the entertainment to the bathroom and masturbated them.

=== Failed marriage ===
The scandal foiled d'Adelswärd's plans to marry Blanche Suzanne Caroline de Maupeou (1884–1951), daughter of the respected aristocratic and wealthy Protestant industrialist Viscount de Maupeou. The court documents mention that one of the blackmail letters was sent to the Viscount prior to the scandal and that Blanche's family was happy to receive the information prior to his arrest and to cancel their marriage plans. After d'Adelswärd's release on 3 December 1903, he tried to visit his fiancée with the intent of explaining the affair, but was sent away by a servant. There were rumours in the press that he tried to end his life, but the accounts in Gazzetta Piemontese and Le Figaro differ.

=== Contemporary reactions ===
Contemporary literary responses to the affair were divided. Pierre Louÿs condemned d'Adelswärd in a private letter to his brother, while Paul Léautaud discussed the scandal with Marcel Schwob. In the salon of Marguerite de Pierrebourg, Marcel Proust defended d'Adelswärd when the playwright and Académie Française member Paul Hervieu called for his punishment, arguing instead for compassion and for the right of individuals to love in their own way. Charles-Louis Philippe adopted a similarly tolerant position in his contribution “Le Mouton à cinq pattes” to the 1903 Messes Noires issue of Le Canard Sauvage, presenting individual passions as deserving acceptance. In the same issue, Alfred Jarry defended d'Adelswärd in the satirical article “L'Âme ouverte à l'Art antique”.

A markedly more hostile response came from the writer Jean Lorrain. In Pelléastres: Le Poison de la littérature, Lorrain devoted an extended discussion to d'Adelswärd and described him as a “snob”, “puerile” and “pitiful”. At the same time, Lorrain rejected the sensational description of the gatherings as actual “Black Masses”, characterising them instead as literary salons that had degenerated into extravagant costume parties centred on d'Adelswärd.

== On Capri ==
=== Construction of Villa Lysis and world travels ===
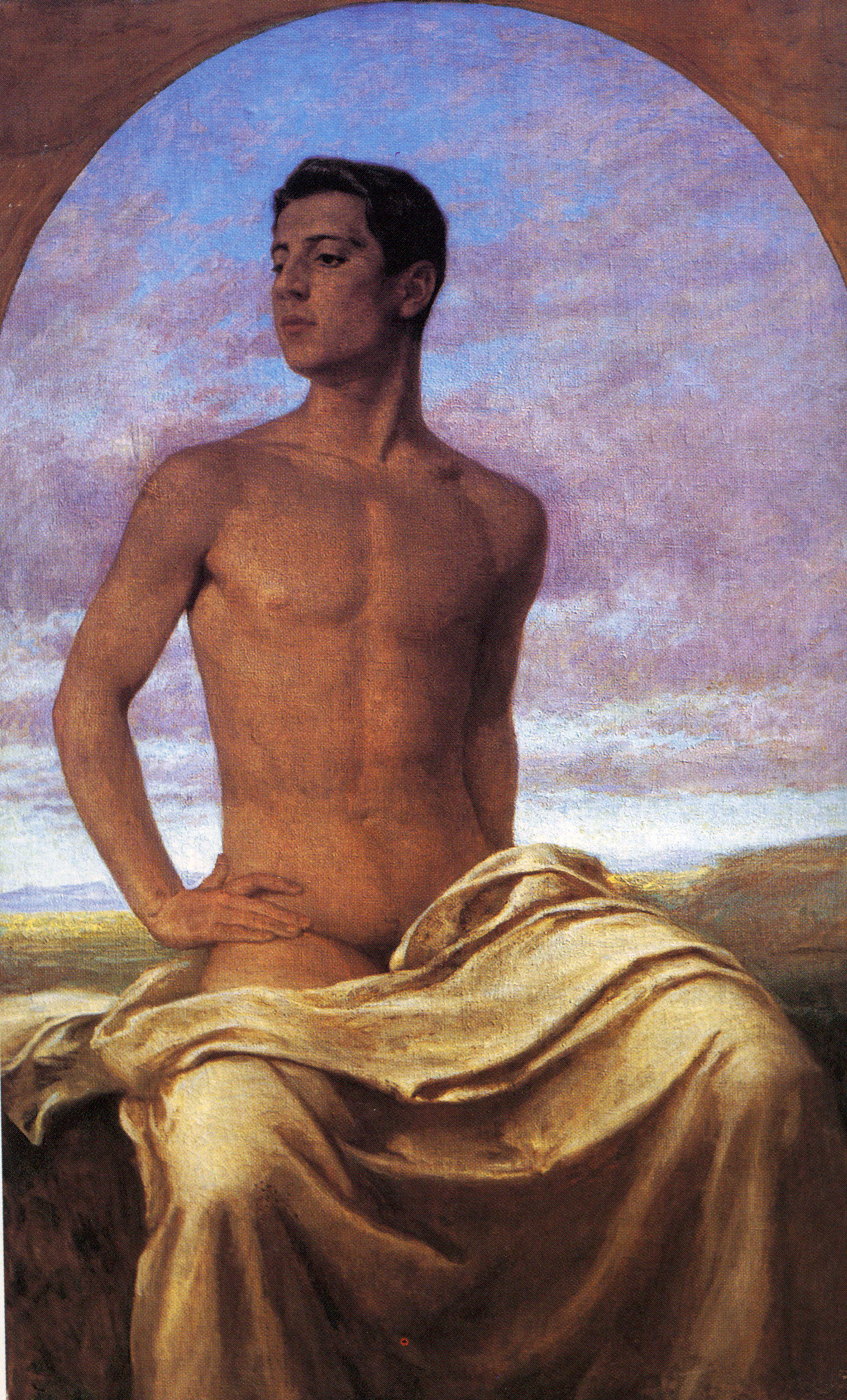
Nino Cesarini, lover of d'Adelswärd-Fersen, painted by Paul Hoecker (1904)

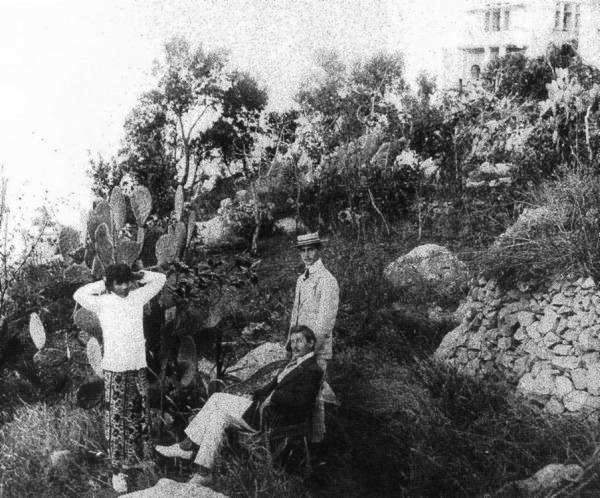
Jacques d'Adelswärd-Fersen and Nino Cesarini (and their Sri Lankan servant), Capri, 1905

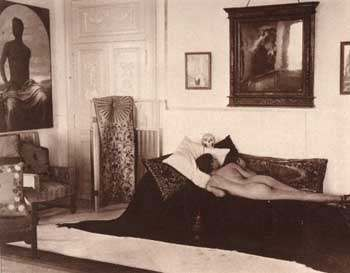
Nino Cesarini, lying naked on a couch in Villa Lysis. His portrait by Paul Hoecker hangs at the wall in front of him.

After his marriage plans were foiled, d'Adelswärd remembered the island of Capri from his youth, and decided to build a house there. The island had already attracted other homosexual or bisexual visitors, such as Christian Wilhelm Allers, Somerset Maugham, E. F. Benson, Lord Alfred Douglas, Robert Ross, Oscar Wilde, Friedrich Alfred Krupp, Norman Douglas, and Compton Mackenzie and his first wife Faith Stone Mackenzie; and attracted many others during d'Adelswärd's stay. He stayed originally at the Grand Hotel Quisisana and then bought land at the top of a hill in the northeast of the island, close to where the Roman emperor Tiberius had built his Villa Jovis two millennia earlier. He commissioned his friend Édouard Chimot to design a villa, initially called Gloriette, but was eventually christened Villa Lysis (later sometimes referred to as Villa Fersen) in reference to Plato's Socratic dialogue Lysis discussing friendship (or, according to modern notions, homosexual love). When the construction started, d'Adelswärd left Capri to visit the Far East. He mostly spent time on Ceylon, where he wrote Lord Lyllian. He returned to Capri in the autumn of 1904, visiting the United States on the way back.

At some point after his return, he had to flee Capri temporarily, since some islanders blamed d'Adelswärd for a local worker's accidental death during the construction of Villa Lysis. He went to Rome, where he met a fourteen-year-old construction worker selling newspapers, Nino Cesarini. D'Adelswärd fell in love with the boy immediately. He obtained Cesarini's family's permission to take him as secretary. In the spring of 1905 d'Adelswärd and Cesarini visited Sicily, where they met with Wilhelm von Gloeden in Taormina.

The construction of the villa was completed in July 1905. Villa Lysis is a notable building. Its style is described by some as "Liberty" but is not Liberty or Art Nouveau in the French manner but may perhaps be described as "Neoclassical decadent". The large garden is connected to the villa by steps leading to an Ionic portico. In the atrium a marble stairway with wrought-iron balustrade leads to the first floor, where there are bedrooms with panoramic terraces, and a dining room. The ground-floor sitting-room, decorated with blue majolica and white ceramic, overlooks the Gulf of Naples. In the basement there is a 'Chinese Room', in which opium was smoked.

D'Adelswärd and Cesarini travelled to Paris, where d'Adelswärd delivered a manuscript to publishers and went directly to Oxford. After returning to Capri, d'Adelswärd, Cesarini and their four boy-servants travelled to China. They all returned to Villa Lysis at the beginning of 1907.

=== Temporary exile from Capri ===
D'Adelswärd published his novel about Capri, Et le feu s'éteignit sur la mer… ('And the fire was smothered by the sea...'), in 1909. The novel told the story of young sculptor Gérard Maleine on Capri. The book was highly criticized, since d'Adelswärd wrote quite frivolously about Caprian habits and morals. Some islanders, recognising themselves in the book, tried to prevent its distribution. Roberto Ciuni reports that the Communal Council of Capri decided to pursue d'Adelswärd's expulsion from the island at its formal meeting on 16 September 1909. Villa Lysis and its inhabitants had a nasty reputation among locals. Giorgio Amendola, the future leader of the Italian Communist Party, who lived on Capri when he was an eleven-year-old boy, led a small gang of boys and girls in 1918, and wrote in his autobiography:

"There were forbidden zones we were not supposed to set foot on. For instance, we were told never to draw near a white villa near [Monte] Tiberio, because (…) nasty things were happening there. Later I grasped that Fersen was meant, and his strange friendships. I was eleven years old, and the Caprian boys were of about my age. They knew very well the meaning of all these allusions."

— Giorgio Amendola

Local authorities used the parties d'Adelswärd threw to celebrate Cesarini's army enlistment and twentieth birthday as an additional reason for expelling him from the island. The parties were held in the Matermània grottos and included theatrical shows with d'Adelswärd playing handsome young Hypatos and Cesarini playing the role of a soldier of Mithra. Fearing the scandal, authorities asked d'Adelswärd's brother-in-law, marquis Alfredo di Bugnano, who was married to d'Adelswärd's sister Germaine, to intervene. The marquis summoned d'Adelswärd to Naples and presented him with two options – either to leave Italy voluntarily or be expelled officially. D'Adelswärd chose to leave. He returned to France in November 1909 and stayed briefly in Paris at 24 rue Eugène Manuel. Cesarini left Capri with d'Adelswärd.

The couple did not stay in Paris for long. They left for Porquerolles on the Îles d'Hyères near Toulon, and later moved to Villa Mezzomonte in Nice. D'Adelswärd also travelled to the Far East again, returning in early 1911. Cesarini was discharged from military service in September 1911 and d'Adelswärd took him on a trip through the Mediterranean to the Far East. They returned to Nice at the end of Spring 1912.

D'Adelswärd acquired permission to return to Capri in April 1913. He dedicated the poem, Ode à la Terre promise ('Ode to the Promised Land') to the Italian Prime Minister Luigi Luzzatti as a celebration of his return.

=== Later life ===
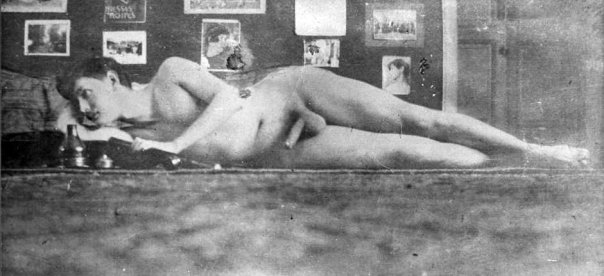
Frontal nude of Jacques d'Adelswärd-Fersen, reclining in his 'Opiarium' (opium den).

When war broke out in 1914, d'Adelswärd was asked to report for military service by the French authorities. He was found unfit for service by specialists in the French consulate in Naples and sent to a hospital for opium addiction. It was reported that he secretly used cocaine while in hospital to compensate for opium. At that time he met Italian sculptor Vincenzo Gemito. After d'Adelswärd came back to Capri, doctors declared him incurably ill. He mostly spent his days without leaving the villa, either working in his study or using opium in the smoking room, which was called his Opiarium by the Naples newspaper Il Mattino.

In 1920, d'Adelswärd met fifteen-year-old Corrado Annicelli, son of a notary from Sorrento, who came for a vacation to Capri with his parents.

He spent the rest of his life based in Capri, and died there in 1923 – allegedly by suicide achieved through drinking a cocktail of champagne and cocaine. His ashes are conserved in the non-Catholic cemetery of Capri. His lover, Nino Cesarini, returned to Rome.

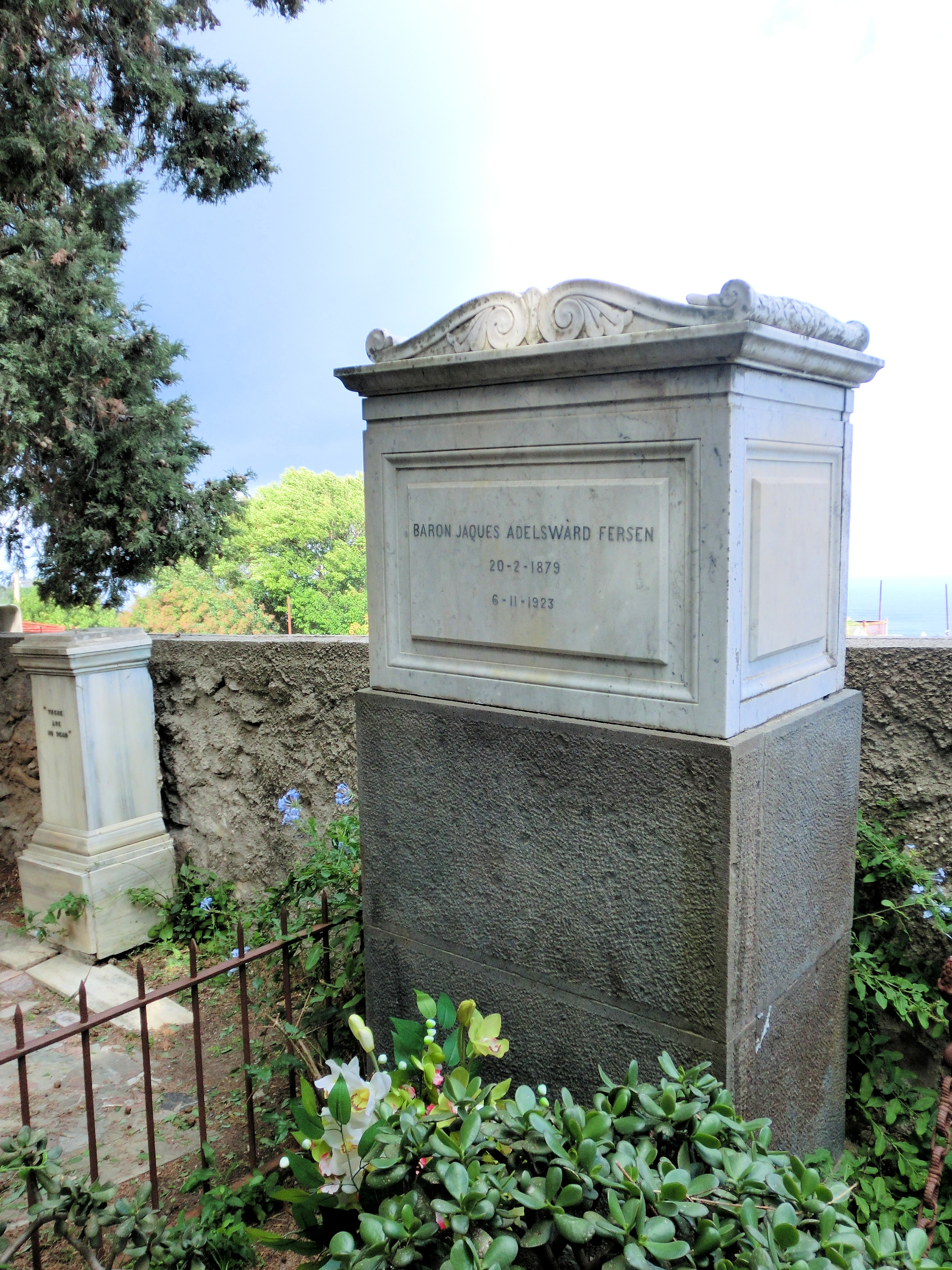
D'Adelswärd-Fersen's grave on Capri (his name, year of birth and day of death are incorrectly rendered)

== Lord Lyllian ==
Lord Lyllian, published in 1905, is one of d'Adelswärd's more important novels, satirizing the scandal around himself in Paris, with touches of the Oscar Wilde affair thrown in for good measure. The hero, Lord Lyllian, departs on a wild odyssey of sexual debauchery, is seduced by a character who seems awfully similar to Oscar Wilde, falls in love with girls and boys, and is finally killed by a boy. The public outcry about the supposed Black Masses is also caricatured. The work is an audacious mix of fact and fiction, including four characters that are alter egos of d'Adelswärd himself.

Lord Lyllian was translated and first published in English in 2005.

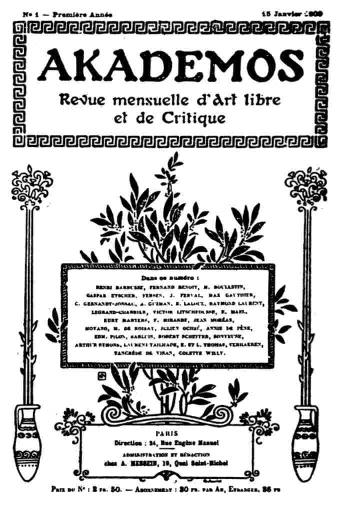
Akademos magazine cover

== Akademos revue ==
Akademos. Revue Mensuelle d'Art Libre et de Critique (1909) was d'Adelswärd's short-lived attempt at publishing a monthly literary journal. It was a periodical of a luxurious kind, each issue printed on several sorts of deluxe paper, with contributions by well-known authors, like Colette, Henry Gauthier-Villars, Laurent Tailhade, Josephin Peladan, Marcel Boulestin, Maxim Gorky, Georges Eekhoud, Achille Essebac, Claude Farrère, Anatole France, Filippo Tommaso Marinetti, Henri Barbusse, Jean Moréas and Arthur Symons.

In each issue, as is clear from d'Adelswärd's letters to Georges Eekhoud, a homosexual element was carefully introduced: a poem, an article, or a hint in the magazine's serial Les Fréquentations de Maurice by Boulestin. As a magazine with homosexual agenda it was the first of its kind in the French language, although only about 10% of Akademos may be counted as homosexual. In its 'gay' content it trod similar ground to that of the German journal, Der Eigene, published between 1896 and 1931 by Adolf Brand. This is not a coincidence, as d'Adelswärd studied the German publications that tried to push for the social acceptance of homosexuality before launching Akademos. Also he corresponded with Brand and Magnus Hirschfeld.

Akademos lasted only one year—there were twelve monthly issues, amounting to some 2,000 pages. Perhaps its production costs were too great; but in a letter to Eekhoud, d'Adelswärd complained of the lack of interest of the press and the public; and a general hostility from press or society cannot be ruled out.

== Film ==
- Capri – Musik die sich entfernt, oder: Die seltsame Reise des Cyrill K. , 1983. — Made-for-TV movie directed by Ferry Radax for the WDR featuring d'Adelswärd-Fersen, Nino Cesarini, and other historical Capri celebrities.
- Music video of soprano Nicole Renaud singing d'Adelswärd-Fersen's poem, Mon cœur est un bouquet, shot in super 8 film at Villa Lysis, Capri, by Karine Laval.

== Music ==
- The lyrics of the song Les amants solitaires by French soprano Nicole Renaud consist of four poems by d'Adelswärd-Fersen.
