= Paul Hoecker =

German painter

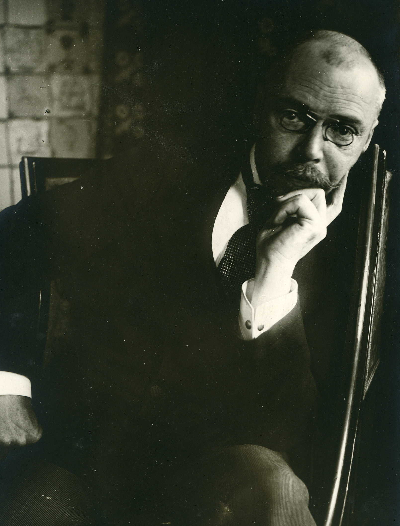
Paul Hoecker (date unknown)

Paul Hoecker (11 August 1854 – 13 January 1910) was a German painter of the Munich School and founding member of the Munich Secession.

== Biography ==
He was born in Oberlangenau. His passion for art developed gradually, beginning at the Gymnasium in Neustadt, where he was known for his humorous drawings and caricatures of his instructors. In 1874, he became a student at the Academy of Fine Arts Munich, which he attended until the spring of 1879. His most influential instructor was Wilhelm von Diez, who led him away from genre painting to a more impressionistic style

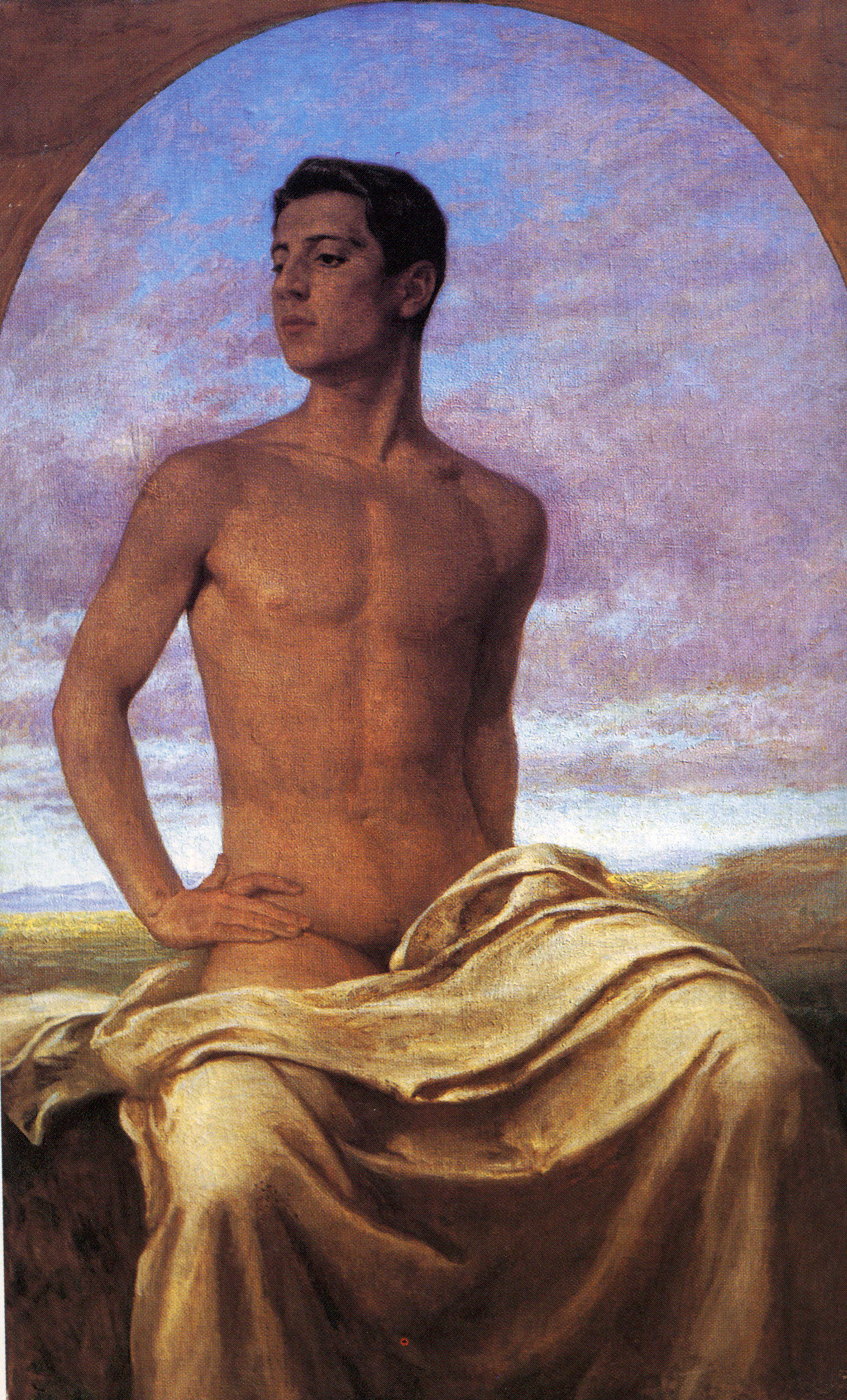
Nino (1904)

In 1882, he took a long journey, which included visits to Paris, the Netherlands, Holstein, the German seaports and then back to Munich, where he became friends with Fritz von Uhde, Bruno Piglhein and Max Liebermann. The next year, he had a display at the Munich International Art Exhibition, then travelled again to Paris and the Netherlands. From 1884 to 1888, he lived in Berlin, but returned to Munich and began painting in naturalistic colors with strong lighting effects.

=== The Munich Academy ===
In 1891, at the young age of 36, he was appointed to the Munich Academy, where he replaced Friedrich August von Kaulbach, who had resigned suddenly. He was the first teacher at the academy to take his students on field trips, which often lasted two weeks. He was also one of the first "modern" teachers there, exposing his students to impressionism and the latest developments from the Barbizon School. His studio was often referred to as the "Geniekasten" (Genius Box).

Due to the pervasive influence of Franz von Lenbach, very little exhibition space was available for any art that was considered modern. In 1892, shortly after being appointed a professor, this problem motivated Hoecker to become one of the founding members of the Munich Secession, acting as its secretary. The Secession ultimately inspired similar movements in Berlin and other cities.

=== Scandal ===
In 1897, a scandal broke out when it was rumored that Hoecker had used a male prostitute as a model for a painting of the Madonna. Eventually, the scandal became more personal in nature, and he chose to resign from the academy. He then travelled to Capri, where he stayed at the Villa Lysis, home of industrialist and poet Jacques d'Adelswärd-Fersen, who had left Paris in the wake of his own scandal. While there, Hoecker painted several portraits of Fersen's lover, Nino Cesarini, a professional model. The Jugend magazine published one of his Nino portraits in 1904 – a fully clothed version. By 1901 he returned to Oberlangenau. In 1910, he died in Munich of what was diagnosed as "Roman Malaria".

== Posthumous recognition ==
Despite his important role for the Munich art scene of the late 19th century, Paul Hoecker is hardly known today. This is probably because he left the professorship as a result of the scandal associated with his homosexuality. In October 2019 a research group was formed at the Forum Queeres Archiv München to investigate the life and work of the painter. Part of the family owned estate of Paul Hoecker has found its way into the archive of the Forum Queeres Archiv München and was digitalized. In 2025, the painting Sage und Volkslied (Legend and Folk Song) by Paul Hoecker was acquired by the Lenbachhaus in Munich through the efforts of the research group, and his gravestone was restored. As part of the research, in 2026 the BQ Gallery in Berlin presented the solo exhibition Imitations of Paul by Philipp Gufler, for which the publication Traces of Paul was produced in collaboration with the Forum Queeres Archiv München.

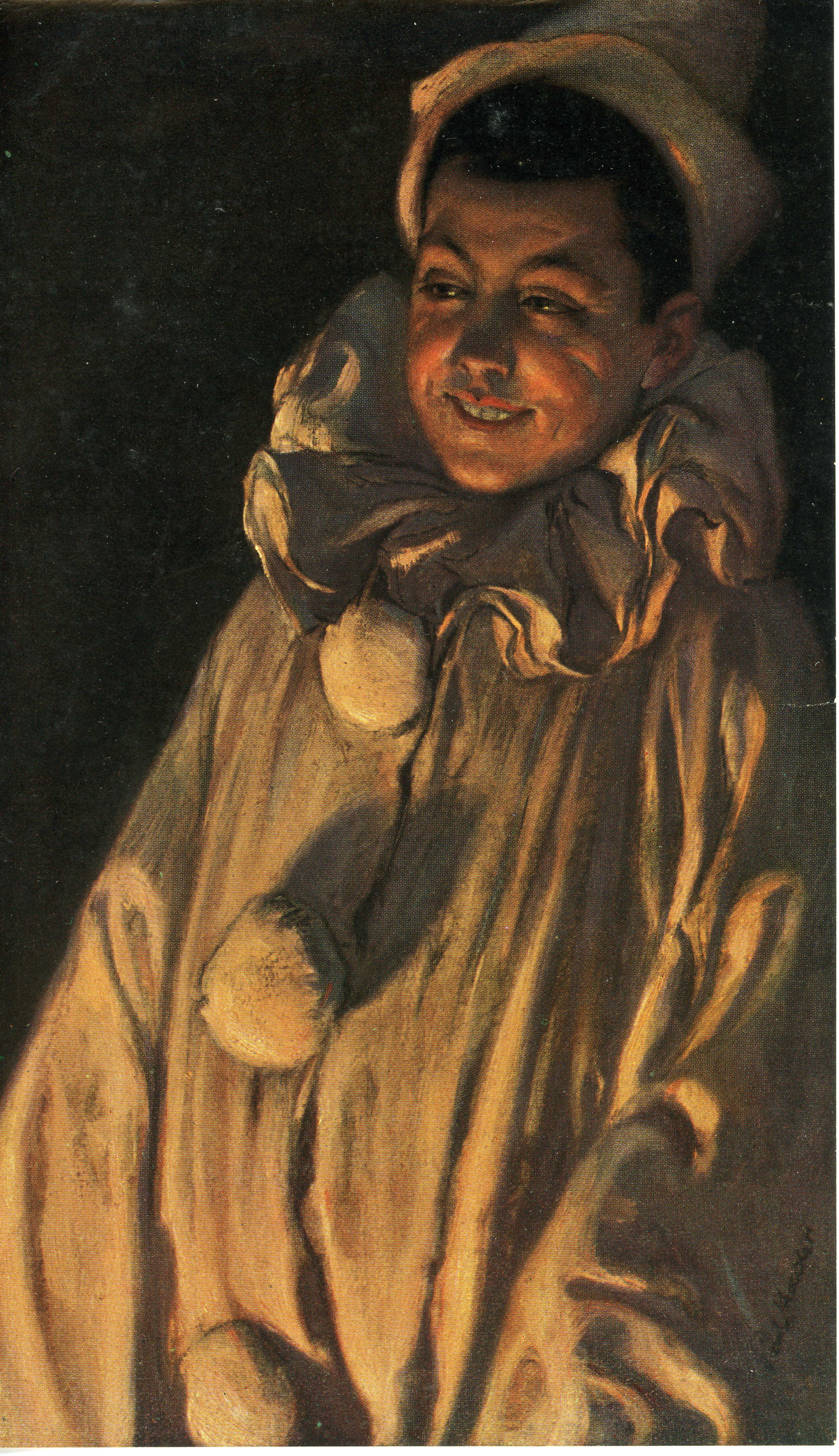
Pierrot (c.1895)
