= Achille Essebac =

French writer (1868–1936)

- Born: Henri Louis Achille Bécasse; 29 January 1868; Paris, France
- Died: 1 August 1936 (aged 68); Paris, France
- Occupation: novelist
- Writing career
- Notable work: Dédé

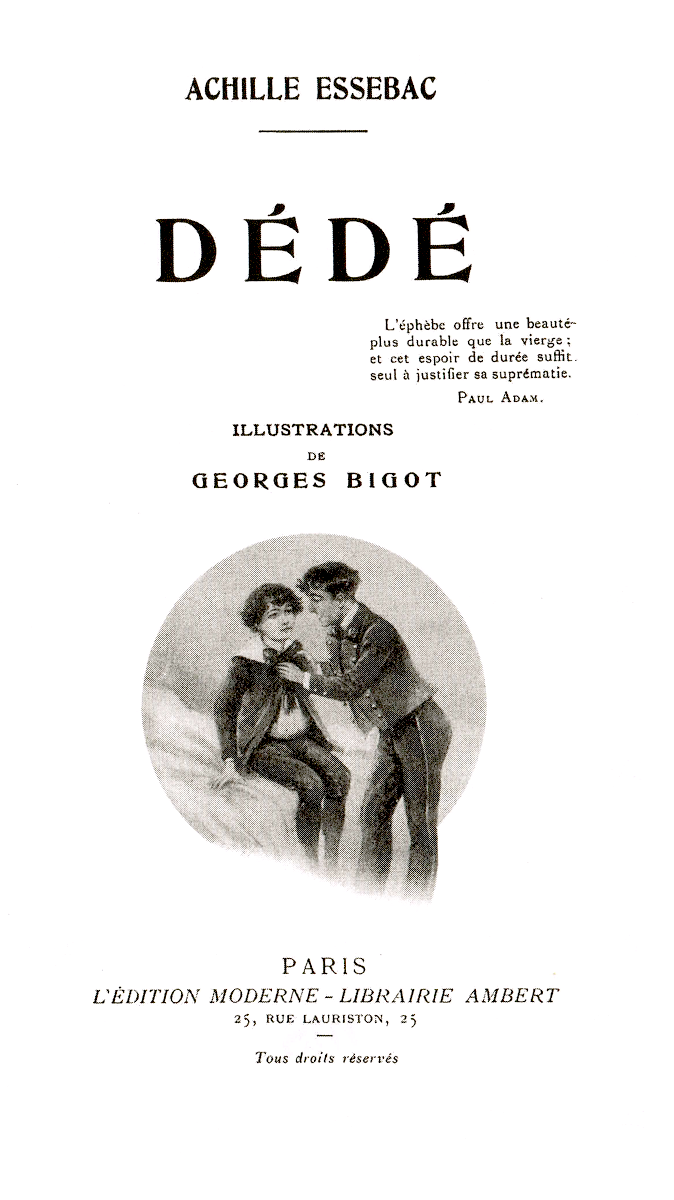
Title page of Dédé with an illustration by Georges Ferdinand Bigot

Achille Essebac (29 January 1868 – 1 August 1936) was a French writer primarily known for his novel Dédé, about an ill-fated homoerotic friendship between two schoolboys. Essebac was a pseudonym, since his original surname Bécasse is a derogatory word for goose.

Essebac was a friend of Jacques d'Adelswärd-Fersen and defended him against accusations of indecency caused by Fersen's penchant for tableaux vivants at his house in Avenue de Friedland. In 1909, Essebac also contributed an article for Fersen's short-lived gay-interest journal Akademos. However, apart from the article, Essebac largely avoided writing about homosexuality after the Fersen scandal.

Essebac was also a photographer of young men, preferably clothed in Renaissance or medieval theatrical costumes. A recently rediscovered album with 156 photographs by him was sold for €3,500 in Paris.

In the 1920s and early 1930s the Dédé-bar existed in Berlin, which was a gay bar named after Essebac's best-known gay character from his novels.

== Books ==
- Partenza... vers la beauté !, 1898
- Dédé, 1901
- Luc, 1902
- L’Élu, 1902
- Les Boucs, 1903
- Les Griffes, 1904
- Nuit païenne, 1907
