= The Exile of Capri =

1959 novel by French writer Roger Peyrefitte

- Author: Roger Peyrefitte
- Original title: L'Exilé de Capri
- Translator: Edward Hyams
- Language: French
- Publisher: Groupe Flammarion
- Publication date: 1959
- Publication place: France
- English publication date: 1961
- Media type: Print
- Pages: 284
- ISBN: 978-0436369025

The Exile of Capri is a 1959 novel by French writer Roger Peyrefitte, based on the lives of Jacques d'Adelswärd-Fersen and Nino Cesarini.

== Plot summary ==
The book starts with a handsome Frenchman in his early 30s meeting a beautiful young seventeen-year-old French boy on the crest of Vesuvius in 1897. They befriend at first sight, and each starts to suspect that they have something more in common than a love for climbing mountains.

== Bibliography ==
- "L'exilé De Capri". Roger Peyrefitte. Flammarion. ISBN 2-253-00119-8. 1959
- "The Exile of Capri". Roger Peyrefitte. Translation: Edward Hyams. Secker & Warburg. 1961
- "The Exile of Capri". Roger Peyrefitte. Foreword by Jean Cocteau. Fleet Publishing Corporation. ASIN B0006BN744. 1965.
- "El exiliado de Capri". Roger Peyrefitte. Paperback. Editorial Egales. ISBN 978-84880-520-94. 2006
