= Umberto Brunelleschi =

Italian artist (1879–1949)

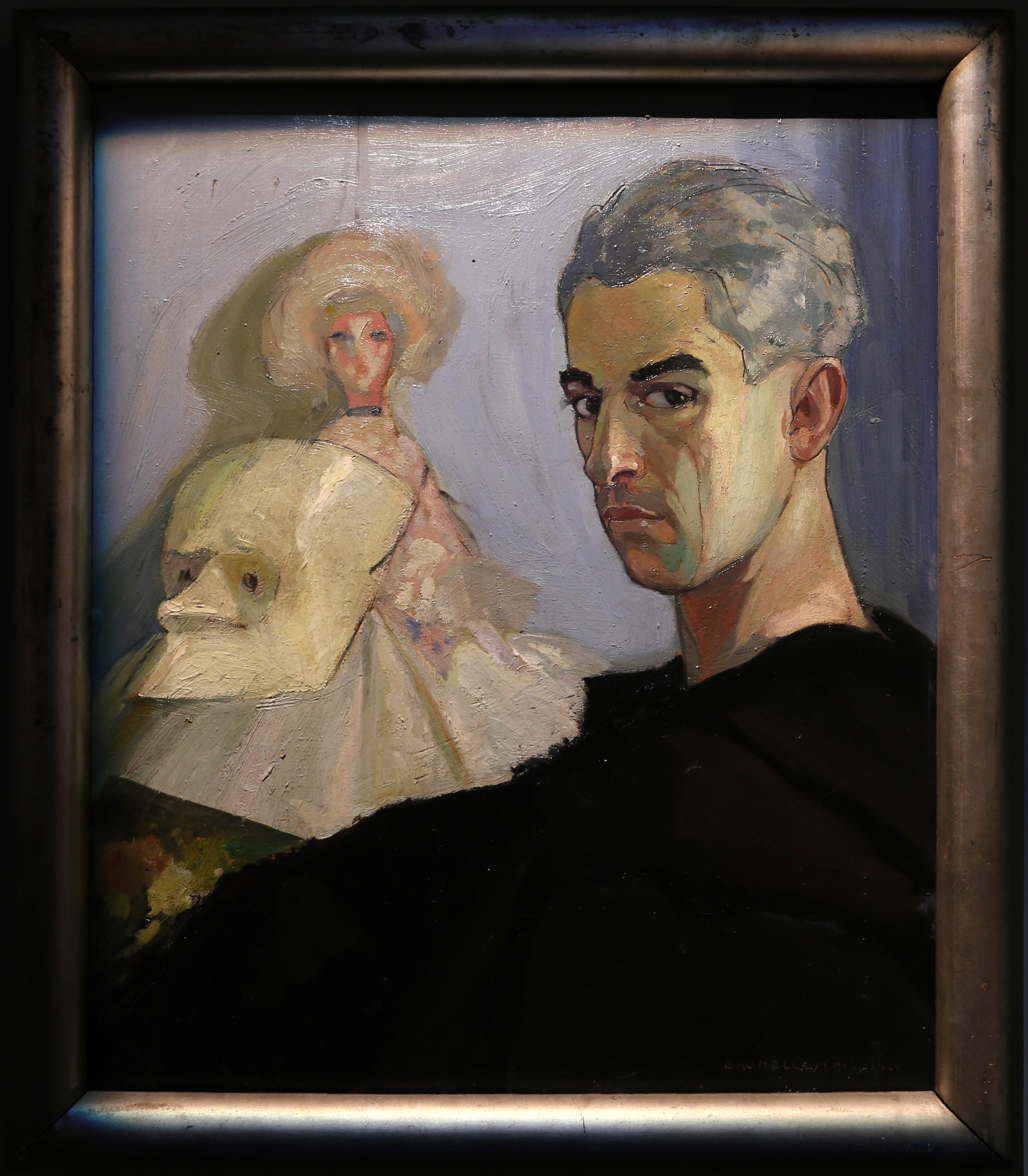
Self-portrait

Umberto Brunelleschi (21 June 1879 – 16 February 1949) was an Italian artist.

== Biography ==
He was born in Montemurlo, Italy, studied at the Accademia delle Belle Arti in Florence and moved to Paris in 1900 with Ardengo Soffici where he soon established himself as a printer, book illustrator, set and costume designer.

He worked for Le Rire as a caricaturist (often under the pseudonym's Aroun-al-Raxid or Aron-al-Rascid) and was a contributor to many of the deluxe French fashion publications including Journal des Dames et Des Modes, La Vie Parisienne, Gazette du Bon Ton and Les Feuillets d'Art. Brunelleschi was also the artistic director of the short lived but significant La Guirlande d'art et de la littérature 1919-1920.

After serving in the Italian Army during the First World War, he returned to Paris. In the 1920s he diversified into set and costume designs for the Folies Bergère, the Casino de Paris, the Théâtre du Châtelet and theatres in New York City, Germany, and in his native country. In Italy, he worked for Opera Houses such as La Scala in Milan, and the Maggio Musicale Fiorentino in Florence. He created costumes for Josephine Baker. He is also noted for his design of the logo for Martial et Armand, a Paris fashion house, around 1923.

His illustrated books include Voltaire (Candide, 1933), Charles Perrault (Contes du temps jadis, 1912), Musset (La Nuit vénitienne), Goethe, Diderot (Les Bijoux indiscrets, etc.), Les Masques et les personnages de la Comédie italienne, 1914; Phili ou Par delà le bien et le mal, 1921; Le Radjah de Mazulipatam, 1925; Le Malheureux Petit Voyage, 1926; and Les Aventures du roi Pausole, 1930.

Umberto Brunelleschi died 1949 in Paris.

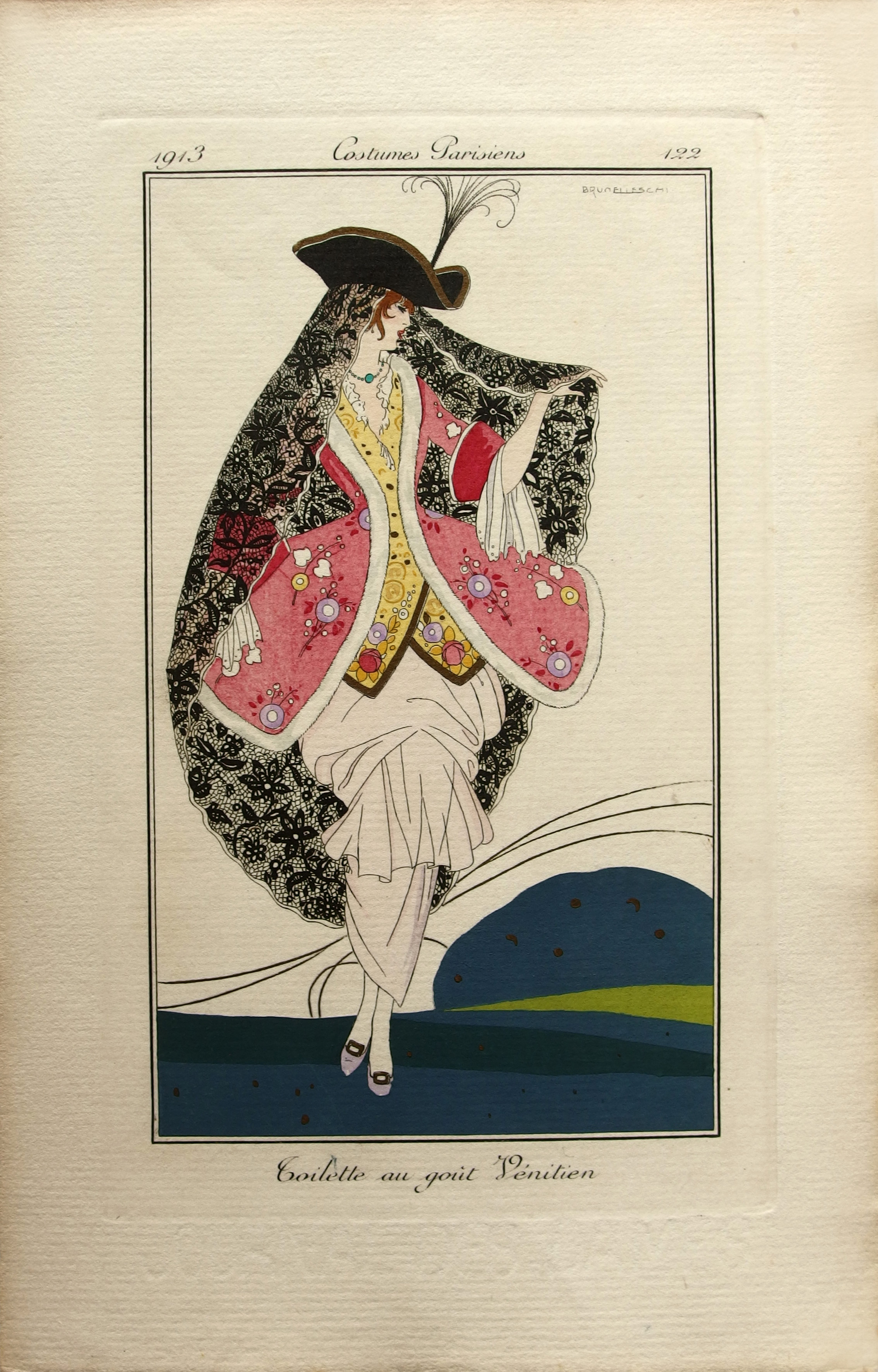
Umberto Brunelleschi, Costumes Parisiens Fashion illustration No.122 from Journal des dames et des modes, 1913

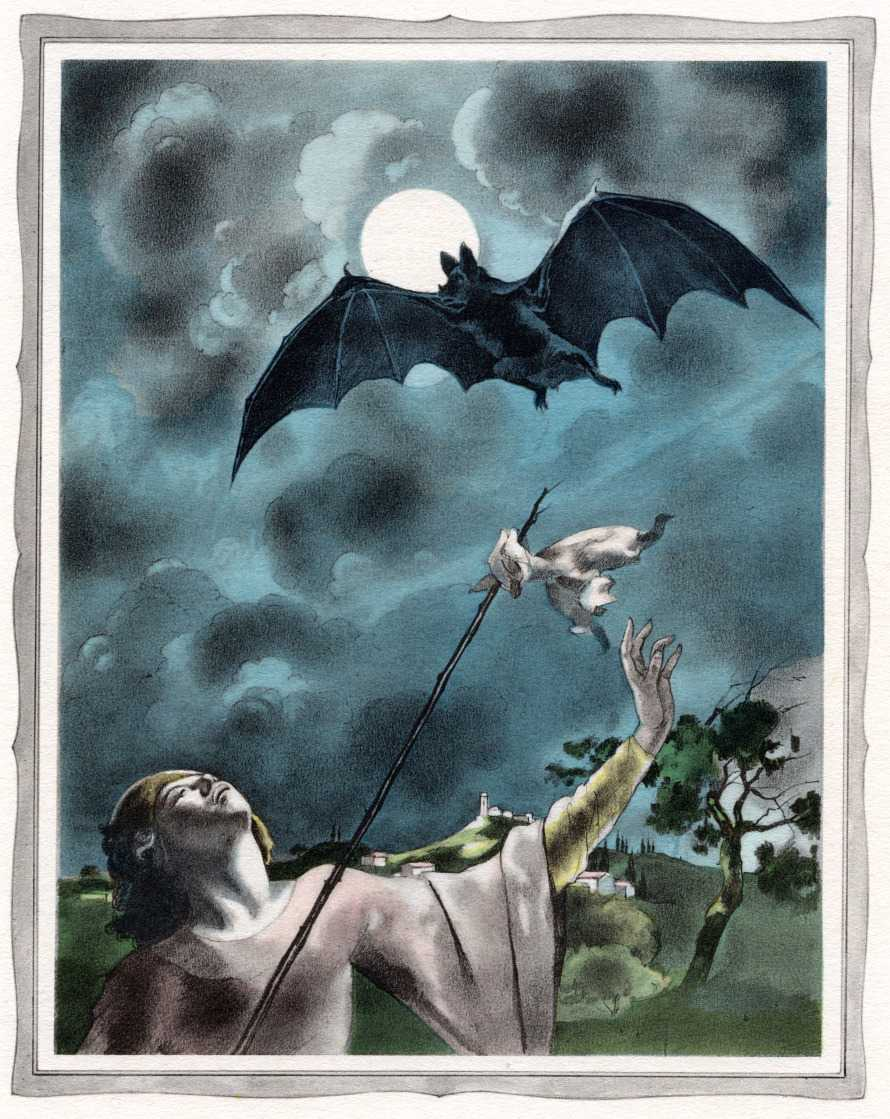
Umberto Brunelleschi, illustration from The Decameron

== Books ==
- Casalis, Laura; Brunelleschi, Umberto (1979). Umberto Brunelleschi, fashion-stylist, illustrator, stage and costume designer. Rizzoli. ISBN 0-8478-0255-8.
