= Will Ogrinc =

Dutch poet (1951–2018)

Willem Hubert Louis (Willy, Wil, Will) Ogrinc (Kerkrade, March 29, 1951 – Utrecht, March 21, 2018) was a Dutch poet and biographer.

== Biography ==
Ogrinc was the son of miner Leonard Hubert Ogrinc and Johanna Catharina Crombach. In the year he was born, his brother Heini (1946–1951) died in an accident. He studied medieval history and was a teacher of it at Rotterdam University of Applied Sciences. In 1976, he published an interview with Boudewijn Büch, whose poetry collection "Quite Sad Songs for Little Gijs" he had previously reviewed, a collection of poems about Büch's alleged love for young boys. Around 1978 he published Youthful Sinners in Constantinople by the journalist Esgo Taco Feenstra Kuiper(1857–1908), which, among other things, discussed the accessible ephebes in the place. He debuted as a poet in 1981 with Ger Kleis at his publishing house Sub Signo Libelli with "Secretum secretorum" which also had the love for boys as the subject. However, his 'life's work' seems to have been the biography of Jacques d'Adelswärd-Fersen (1880–1923), the first version of which he published in 1994 in the Amsterdam English-language magazine Paedika. The Journal of Paedophilia. Adelswärd is known for his literary work, his interest in boys around the age of 15, and the scandal he caused in Paris in 1903. Ogrinc was the one who first examined the preserved Paris court documents regarding Adelswärd in 2003. Since then, this biographical publication has always been mentioned in the literature about Adelswärd.

=== Death ===
Will Ogrinc died in 2018 at the age of 66.

== Bibliography ==
- [About: Büch, Boudewijn. Rather sad songs for little Gijs: poems. Amsterdam, 1976], in: De vernis 1 (1976–1977) 1 (1976), p. 12-13
- 'Spoken with Boudewijn Büch', in: De vernis 1 (1976–1977) 2 (winter 1976), p. 5-17.
- Secretum secretorum. [Amsterdam], 1981.
- Rosa rubea. Seu decor evigilans Hagæ comitis. [Amsterdam], 1982.
- 'Bathing boys, 2. Rise and fall of a beautiful cliché (c. 1850 - c. 1950)', in: OK. Info magazine about the elderly, children, relationships (1987) 6 (March), p. 26-35.
- 'Boyhood paedophilia & ephebophilia selected bibliography (c. 1987–1997)', in: Tegentegen (summer 1997).
- Boyhood and Adolescence, Ephebophilia, Hebephilia, and Pædophilia : A Selected Bibliography. Paris, Quintes feuilles, 2017.
