= Corrado Annicelli =

Italian actor (1905–1984)

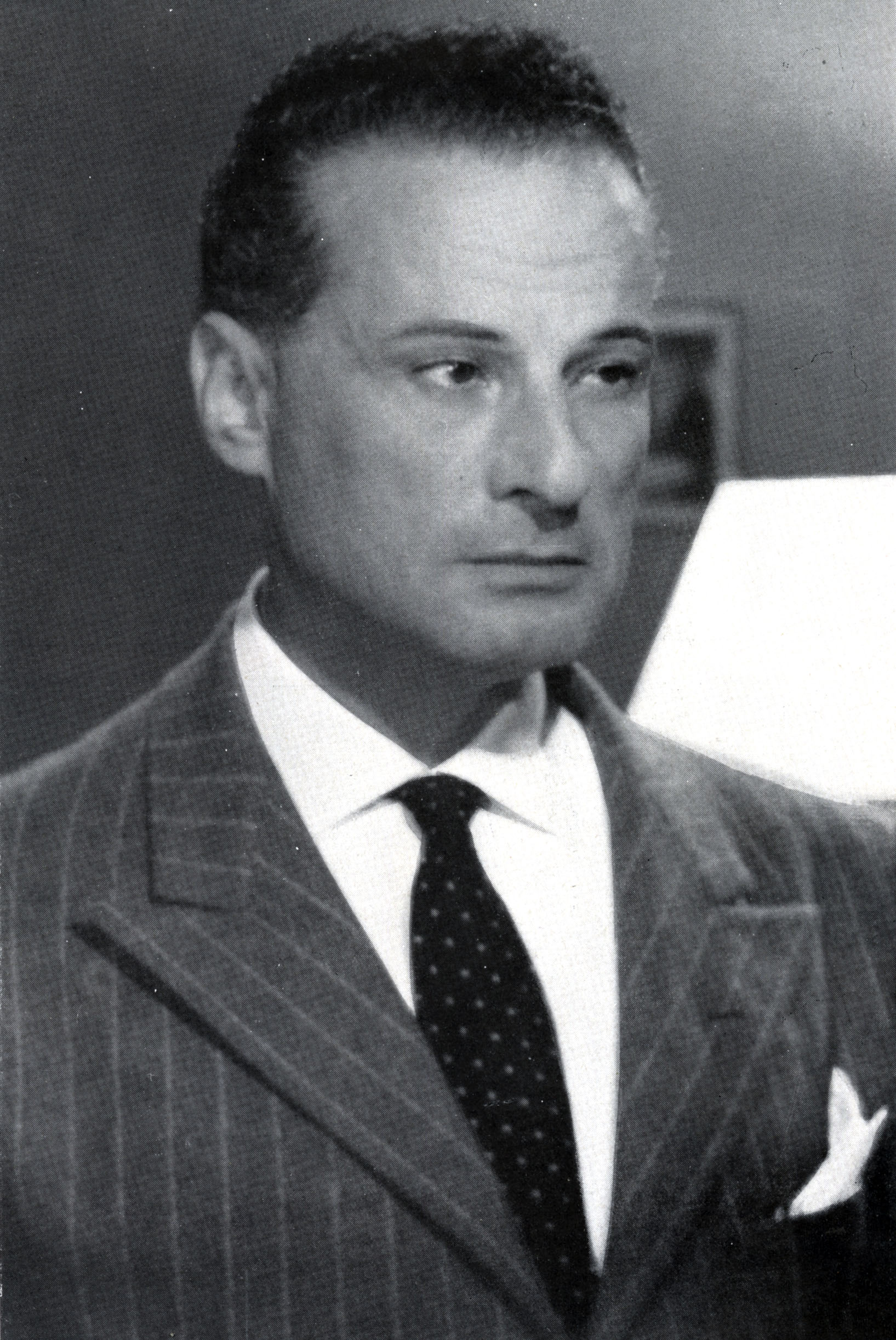
- Annicelli in Cineguida magazine, 1953
- Born: 1 September 1905; Naples, Italy
- Died: 28 August 1984 (aged 78); Rome, Italy
- Occupation: Actor

Corrado Annicelli (1 September 1905 – 28 August 1984) was an Italian actor.

== Life and career ==
Born in Naples, Annicelli made his stage debut in 1927, cast by Dora Menichelli to play a fascinating officer in the drama play Guerra in tempo di pace. From then he started a career on stage with the major companies of the time, working with Lamberto Picasso, Emma Gramatica (with whom he made a long tour of South and Central America), Ruggero Ruggeri, Antonio Gandusio among others. In 1942 Annicelli become one of the most acclaimed radio actors reciting several Italian and especially Neapolitan comedies.

Annicelli was also active in films (even if usually in character roles), in television productions. As a young man he was the partner of Jacques d'Adelswärd Fersen, a French count, author and poet, living on Capri.

== Filmography ==
Year	Title	Role	Notes
1934	Si fa così		
1936	L'anonima Roylott		
1951	Napoleon		
1952	Gli uomini non guardano il cielo		
1952	Il tallone di Achille	Diplomatico Russo	
1953	The Blind Woman of Sorrento	Dottore Andrea Pisani	
1953	Nero e Messalina		
1954	Schiava del peccato	Billiards Player	Uncredited
1954	Uomini ombra	Ufficial contraspionaggio	
1954	Amore e smarrimento		
1955	Scapricciatiello	Alberto Aiello - The administrator	
1956	Toto, Peppino, and the Hussy	The Duke	
1956	Wives and Obscurities		
1957	A sud niente di nuovo		
1958	Il Conte di Matera		
1958	Il bacio del sole (Don Vesuvio)	Il signore derubato	
1960	Pirates of the Coast	Pedro Salvador	
1961	The Last of the Vikings	Godrun	
1961	Guns of the Black Witch		
1961	The Secret of the Black Falcon	Don Alvaro Fontejuna	
1962	Gli attendenti		
1962	Venus Against the Son of Hercules		
1962	Sfida nella città dell'oro		
1962	Sherlock Holmes and the Deadly Necklace	Samuels	Uncredited
1964	The Secret of the Chinese Carnation	Professor Bexter	
1964	Il figlio di Cleopatra	Longino	
1966	For One Thousand Dollars Per Day		
1966	The Mona Lisa Has Been Stolen		
1972	Lo chiamavano Verità	Will James	
1974	Silence the Witness	L'anziano professore di Sironi	
1974	The Kiss		
1975	Cagliostro		
1975	The Divine Nymph		
