= Roger Peyrefitte =

French diplomat and writer

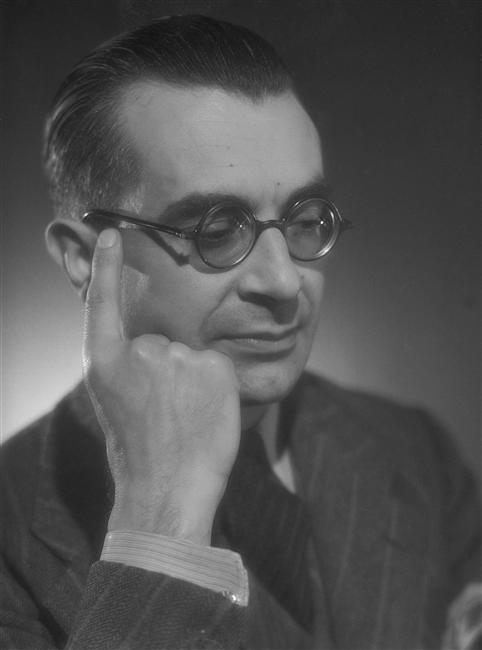
- Peyrefitte in 1947
- Born: 17 August 1907; Castres, Tarn, France
- Died: 5 November 2000 (aged 93); Paris, France
- Occupation: Novelist
- Children: Alain-Philippe Malagnac (adoptive son)
- Writing career
- Notable works: Les Amitiés particulières Trilogy about Alexander the Great

Pierre Roger Peyrefitte (French: [ʁɔʒe pɛʁfit]; 17 August 1907 – 5 November 2000) was a French diplomat, writer of bestseller novels and non-fiction, and a defender of gay rights.

== Life and work ==
Born in Castres, Tarn, to a bourgeois family, Peyrefitte went to Jesuit and Lazarist boarding schools and then studied language and literature at the University of Toulouse. After graduating first in his year from Institut d'Études Politiques de Paris in 1930, he worked as an embassy secretary in Athens between 1933 and 1938. Back in Paris, he had to resign in 1940 for personal reasons before being reintegrated in 1943 and finally ending his diplomatic career in 1945. In his novels, he often treated controversial themes and his work put him at odds with the Catholic Church.

He wrote openly about his homoerotic experiences in boarding school in his 1943 first novel Les amitiés particulières which won the coveted prix Renaudot in 1944. The book was made into a film of the same name which was released in 1964. On the set, Peyrefitte met the 12-year-old Alain-Philippe Malagnac d'Argens de Villèle; Peyrefitte tells the story of their relationship in Notre amour ("Our Love" – 1967) and L'Enfant de cœur ("Child of the Heart" – 1978). Malagnac later married performer Amanda Lear.

A cultivator of scandal, Peyrefitte attacked the Vatican and Pope Pius XII in his book Les Clés de saint Pierre (1953), which earned him the nickname of "Pope of the Homosexuals". The publication of the book started a bitter quarrel with François Mauriac. Mauriac threatened to resign from the paper he was working with at the time, L'Express, if it did not stop carrying advertisements for the book. The quarrel was exacerbated by Mauriac's articles attacking the memory of Jean Cocteau because of his homosexuality and the release of the film adaptation of Les amitiés particulières. This culminated in a virulent open letter by Peyrefitte in which he accused Mauriac of being a hypocrite, a fake heterosexual who maligned his own children and a closeted homosexual with a past.

In Les Ambassades (1951), he revealed the ins and outs of diplomacy. Peyrefitte also wrote a book full of gossip about Baron Jacques d'Adelswärd-Fersen's exile in Capri (L'Exilé de Capri, 1959) and translated Greek gay love poetry (La Muse garçonnière (The Boyish Muse), Flammarion, 1973).

In his memoirs, Propos Secrets, he wrote extensively about his youth, his sex life (pederastic mainly and a few affairs with women), his years as a diplomat, and his travels to Greece and Italy.

Roger Peyrefitte wrote popular historical biographies about Alexander the Great and Voltaire. In Voltaire et Frédéric II he claimed that Voltaire had been the passive lover of Frederick the Great.

In spite of his libertarian views on sexuality, politically Peyrefitte was a conservative bourgeois and in his later years he supported the far-right politician Jean-Marie Le Pen.

He died of Parkinson's disease at age 93.

== Legacy ==
I am the most well-known defender of homosexual rights in France. That is certain. Often they call me 'The Pope of Homosexuality.' That's because I am the author of The Keys of St. Peter and The Knights of Malta, the most important books by a contemporary writer on the Catholic Church.

— Interview to the Gay Sunshine Journal (1979)

After his death, the city of Capri dedicated a plaque to him which is mounted near Villa Lysis and the inscription of which reads: A Roger Peyrefitte autore de L'esule di Capri per aver esaltato e diffuso il mito, la cultura e la bellezza dell'isola nel mondo. — "For Roger Peyrefitte, author of L'Exile de Capri, for having exalted and disseminated the myth, the culture, and the beauty of this island in the world."

In a 2012 essay about the importance of public libraries, English actor and writer Stephen Fry mentions that Peyrefitte's novels The Exile of Capri and Special Friendships were "unforgettable, transformative books" for him.

== Bibliography ==
- Les Amitiés particulières, novel, Editions Flammarion 1944 (English translations as Special Friendships by Felix Giovanelli 1950 & Edward Hyams 1958: ISBN 0-914301-23-3)
- Mademoiselle de Murville, novel, Editions Jean Vigneau 1947
- Le Prince des neiges, drama in 3 acts, Editions Jean Vigneau 1947
- L'Oracle, novel, Editions Jean Vigneau 1948 (definitive edition 1974)
- Les Amours singulières, novel, Editions Jean Vigneau 1949
- La Mort d'une mère, Editions Flammarion 1950
- Les Ambassades, novel, Editions Flammarion 1951 (English translation 1953 by James FitzMaurice as Diplomatic Diversions: ISBN 0-436-36901-X)
- Les Œuvres libres - Roger Peyrefitte, etc. Editions Arthème Fayard 1951
- Du Vésuve à l'Etna, travelogue, Editions Flammarion 1952 (English translation 1954 by John McEwen as South from Naples)
- La Fin des ambassades, novel, Editions Flammarion 1953 (English translation 1954 by Edward Hyams as Diplomatic Conclusions: ISBN 0-436-36900-1)
- Les Amours, de Lucien de Samosate (translation of the original Greek), Editions Flammarion 1954
- Les Clés de saint Pierre, novel, Editions Flammarion 1955 (English translation 1957 by Edward Hyams as The Keys of St. Peter)
- Jeunes Proies, Editions Flammarion 1956
- Les Chevaliers de Malte, Editions Flammarion 1957 (English translation: ISBN 0-87599-087-8)
- L'Exilé de Capri, Editions Flammarion 1959 (English translation 1961 by Edward Hyams as The Exile of Capri)
- Le Spectateur nocturne, dramatic dialogue, Editions Flammarion 1960
- Les Fils de la lumière, study of Free-Masonry, Editions Flammarion 1961
- La Nature du Prince, Editions Flammarion 1963
- Les Secrets des conclaves, Editions Flammarion 1964
- Les Juifs, Editions Flammarion 1965 (English translation: ISBN 0-436-36903-6)
- Notre Amour, Editions Flammarion 1967
- Les Américains, novel, Editions Flammarion 1968
- Des Français, novel, Editions Flammarion 1970
- La Coloquinte, novel, Editions Flammarion 1971
- Manouche, biography of Germaine Germain, Editions Flammarion 1972 (English translations as Manouche by Derek Coltman 1973 & Sam Flores 1974: ISBN 0-8021-0046-5)
- L'Enfant Amour, essay, Editions Flammarion 1972
- Un Musée de l'Amour, photographs of his collection of pederastic art by Marianne Haas, Editions du Rocher 1972
- La Muse Garçonnière, (Musa Paidika) translated of the original Greek, Editions Flammarion 1973
- Tableaux de chasse, ou la vie extraordinaire de Fernand Legros, Editions Albin Michel 1976
- Propos secrets, memoirs, Editions Albin Michel 1977
- Trilogy about Alexander the Great - Editions Albin Michel
  1. La Jeunesse d'Alexandre, 1977
  2. Les Conquêtes d'Alexandre, 1979
  3. Alexandre le Grand, 1981
- Propos secrets 2, memoirs, Editions Albin Michel 1980
- L'Enfant de cœur, Editions Albin Michel 1978
- Roy, novel, Editions Albin Michel 1979
- L'Illustre écrivain, Editions Albin Michel 1982
- Henry de Montherlant - Roger Peyrefitte - Correspondance (1938-1941), presentation and notes by R. Peyrefitte and Pierre Sipriot, Editions Robert Laffont 1983
- La Soutane rouge, Edition du Mercure de France 1983
- Doucet Louis, raconté par... photographs by Rosine Mazin, Editions Sun 1985
- Voltaire, sa jeunesse et son temps, biography, Editions Albin Michel 1985
- L' Innominato: Nouveaux Propos Secrets, memoirs, Editions Albin Michel 1989
- Voltaire et Frédéric II, Editions Albin Michel 1992
- Réflexions sur De Gaulle, Paris, Editions régionales 1991
- Le Dernier des Sivry, novel, Editions du Rocher, Monaco 1993
- Retours en Sicile, Editions du Rocher, Monaco 1996
