= Villa Jovis =

Roman palace on Capri, Italy

Villa jovis
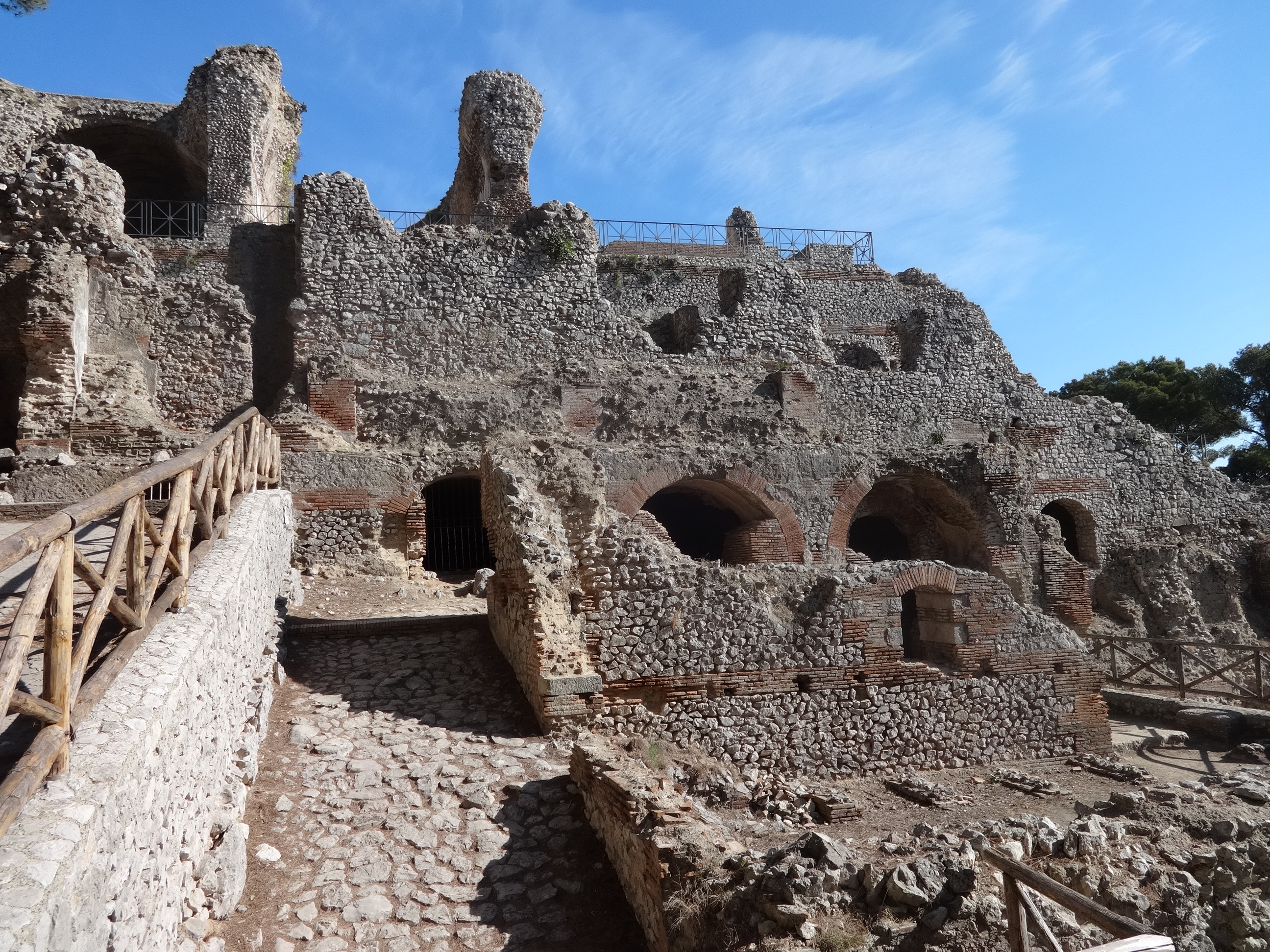
- The remains of Villa Jovis

- Location within Italy
- 40°33′30″N 14°15′44″E
- Type: Dwelling
- Periods: Roman Imperial
- Cultures: Roman
- Location: Capri, Italy
- Region: Campania

Site notes
- Condition: Ruined
- Owner: Public
- Public access: Yes
- Website: cir.campania.beniculturali.it/archeocapri/percorso/schede/capri-villa-jovis

Villa Jovis slave quarters walkthrough

Villa Jovis ("Villa of Jupiter") is a Roman palace on Capri, southern Italy, built by Emperor Tiberius and completed in 27 AD. Tiberius ruled mainly from there until his death in 37 AD.

Villa Jovis is the largest of the twelve Tiberian villas on Capri mentioned by Tacitus. The entire complex, spanning several terraces and a difference in elevation of about 40 m (130 ft), covers some 7,000 square metres (75,000 square feet). While the remaining eight levels of walls and staircases only hint at the grandeur the building must have had in its time, recent reconstructions have shown the villa to be a remarkable testament to 1st-century Roman architecture.

== Location and description of the palace ==
Villa Jovis is situated in the very northeast of the island atop Monte Tiberio; its 334 m (1,096 ft) elevation makes it the second-highest peak of Capri, after Monte Solaro (589 m [1,932 ft] elevation) in Anacapri.

The north wing of the building contained the living quarters, while the south wing saw administrative use. The east wing was meant for receptions, whereas the west wing featured an open-walled hall (ambulatio) which offered a scenic view towards Anacapri.

As water was difficult to obtain at the villa's location, Roman engineers constructed an intricate system for the collection of rainwater from the roofs and a large cistern that supplied the palace with fresh water.

South of the main building there are remains of a watch tower (specula) for the quick telegraphic exchange of messages with the mainland, e.g. by fire or smoke.

Access to the complex is possible only on foot, and involves an uphill walk of about two kilometres (one mile) from the town of Capri.

== Tiberius and his life on Capri ==
Apparently, the main motivations for Tiberius's move from Rome to Capri were his wariness of the political manoeuvring in Rome and a lingering fear of assassination. The villa is situated at a very secluded spot on the island and Tiberius's quarters in the north and east of the palatial villa were particularly difficult to reach and heavily guarded.

The Villa Jovis is also, at least according to Suetonius, the place where Tiberius engaged in wild debauchery. Most modern historians regard these tales as sensationalized, but Suetonius's stories at least paint a picture of how Tiberius was perceived by the Roman people at the time.

== Gallery ==
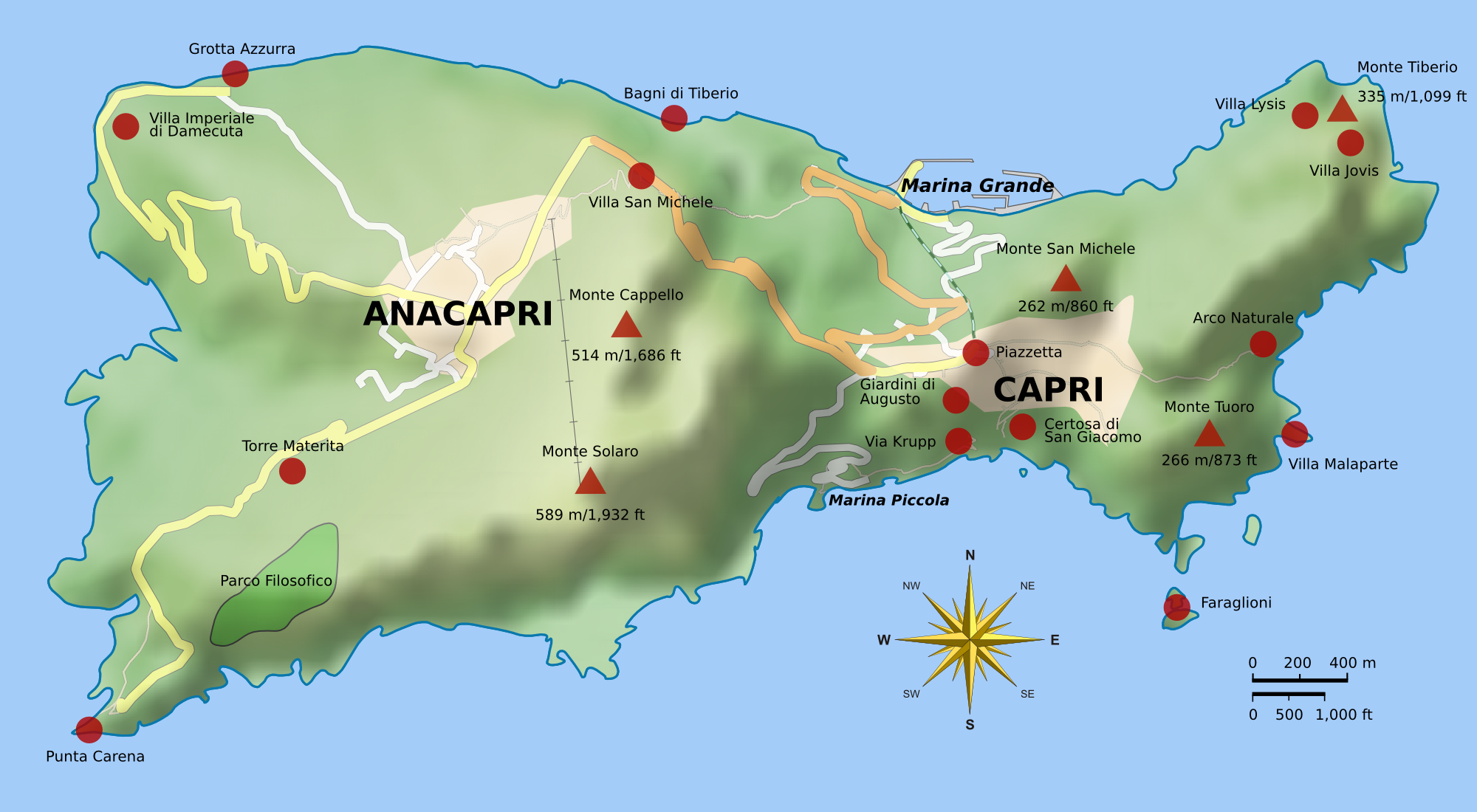
Map of Capri with Villa Jovis in the north-east corner of the island

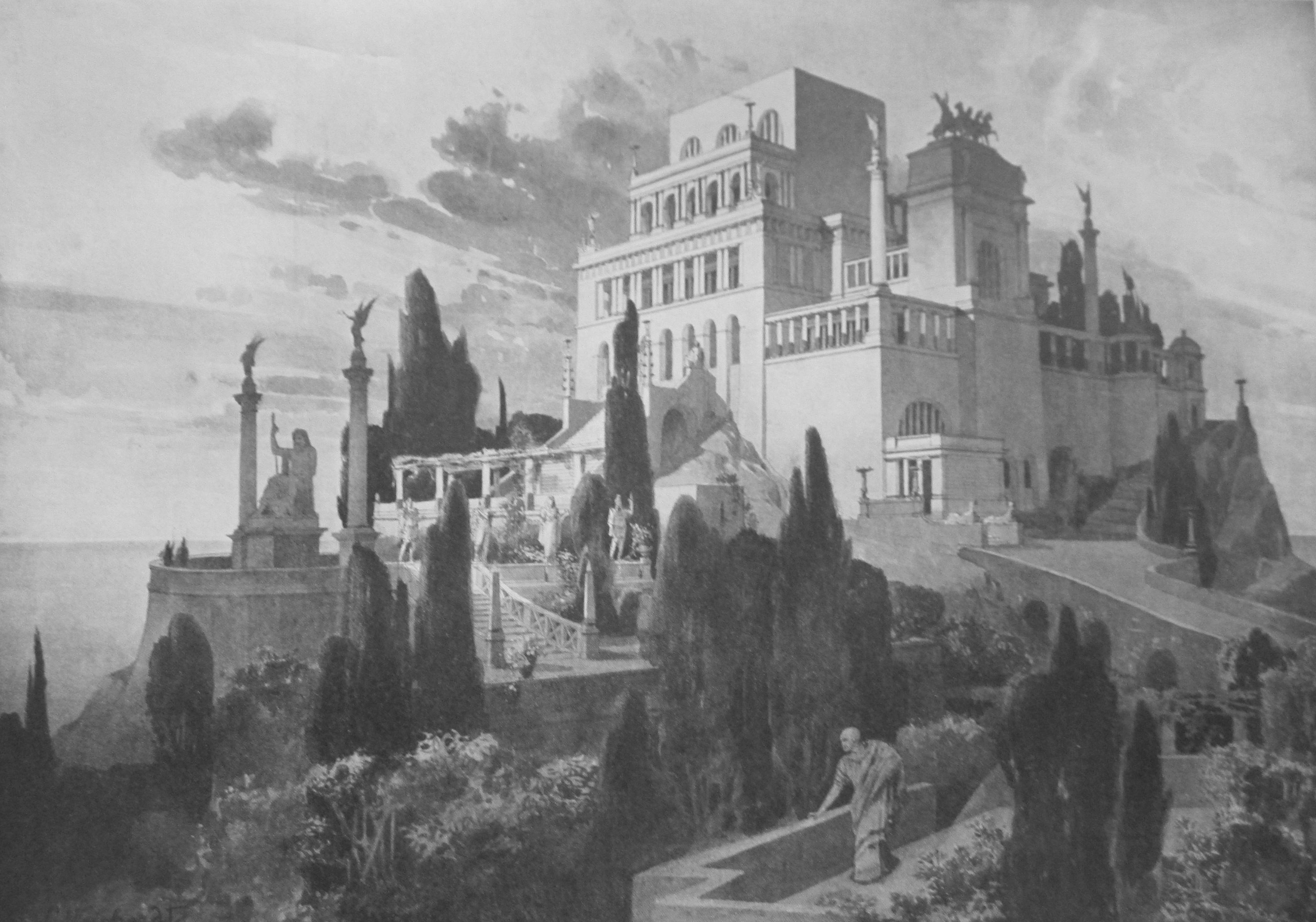
Reconstruction by Weichardt (1900), view from the south-west

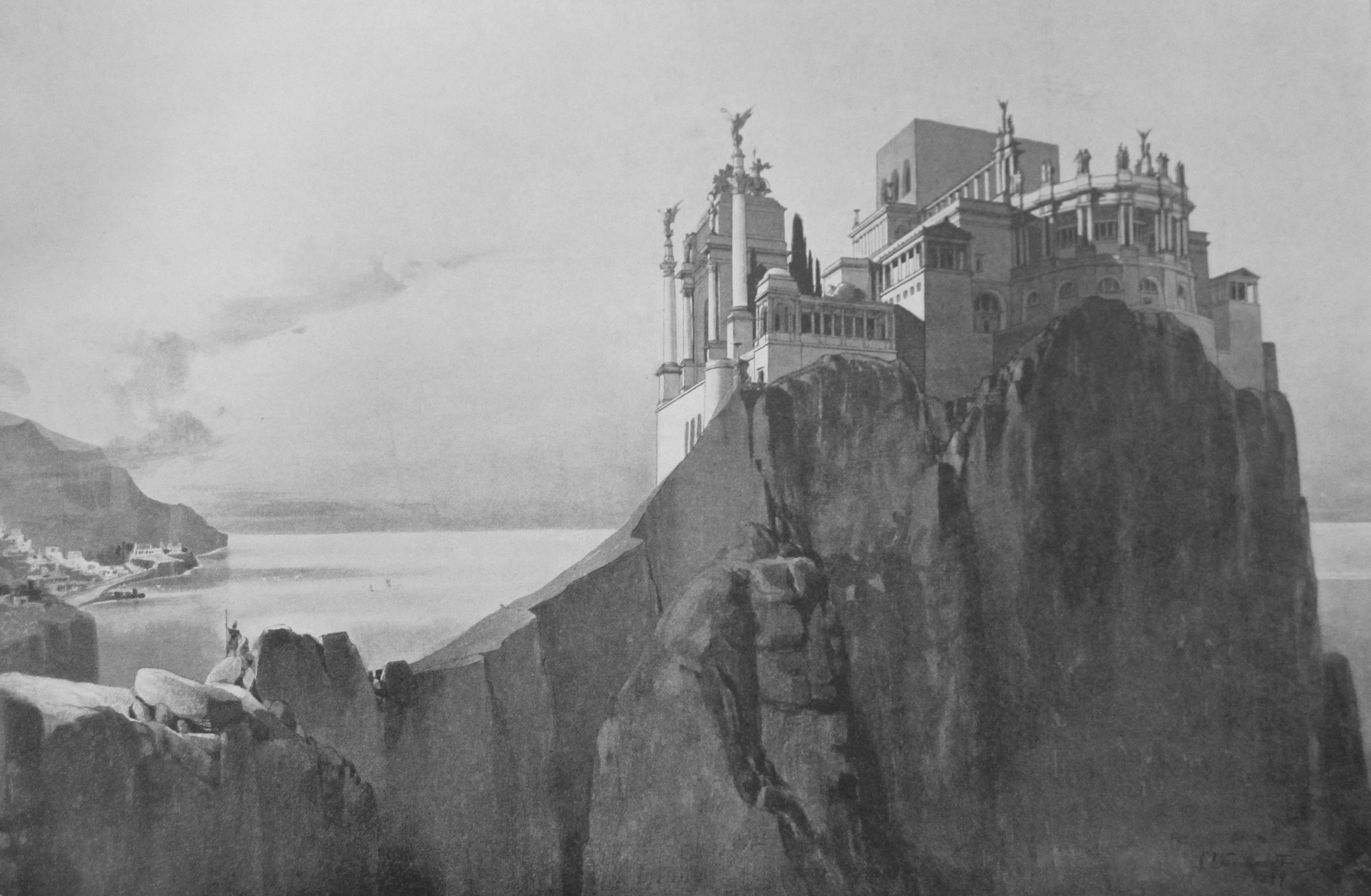
Reconstruction by Weichardt (1900), view from the east

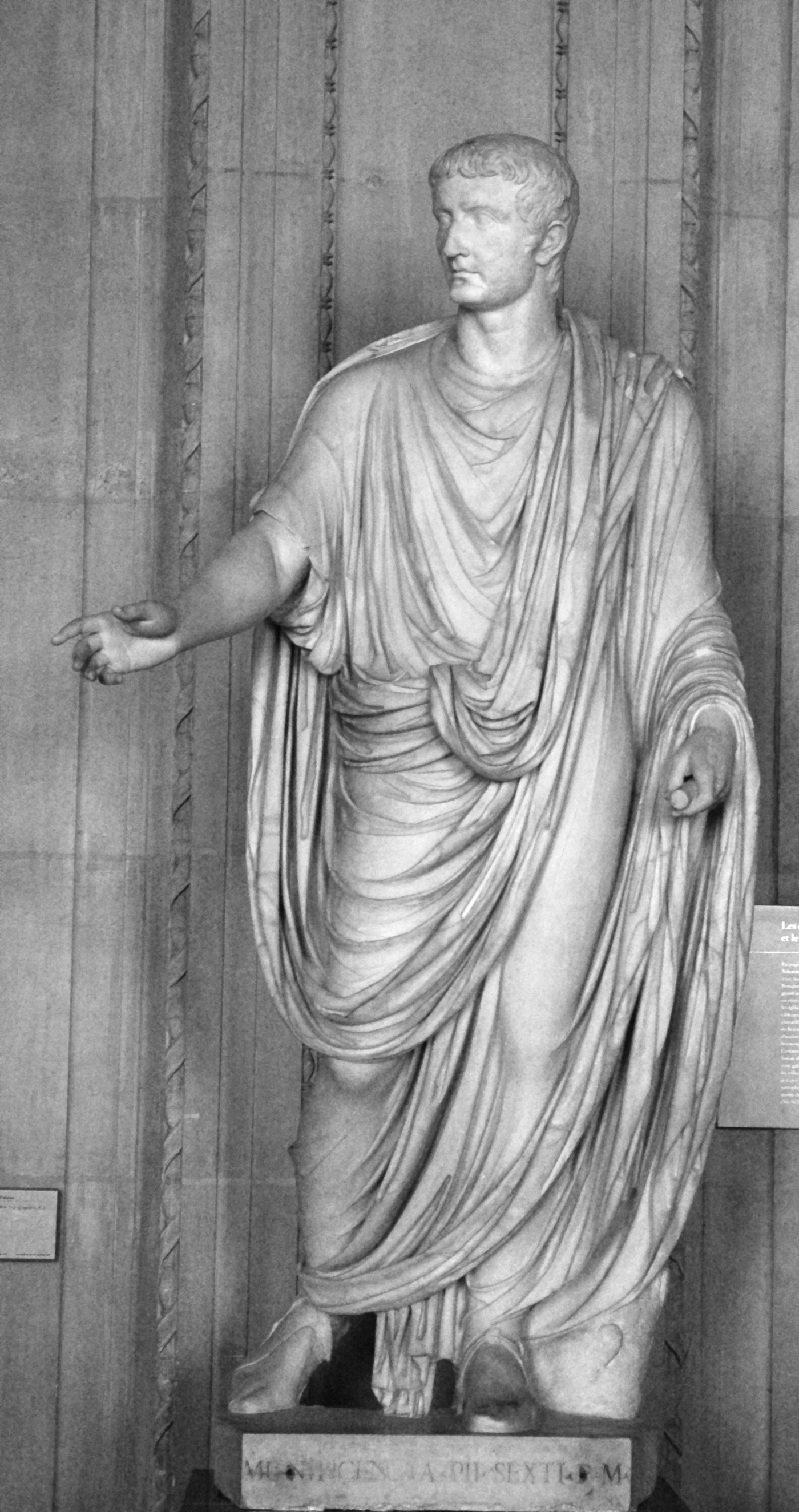
Marble statue of Tiberius found on Capri

== References and further reading ==
- Clemens Krause, 2003. "Villa Jovis — Die Residenz des Tiberius auf Capri", Zaberns Bildbände zur Archäologie (Mainz am Rhein)
- Clemens Krause, Villa Jovis. L'edificio residenziale, electa napoli 2006.
