= Tankersley =

Tankersley may refer to:

== Buildings ==
- Tankersley Tavern, Virginia
- Tankersley-Stewart House, Arkansas

== Places ==
- Tankersley, South Yorkshire
- Tankersley, Texas

== People ==
- Bazy Tankersley, horse breeder and publisher of the Washington Times-Herald
- Cordrea Tankersley (born 1993), American football player
- Dennis Tankersley (born 1979), American baseball pitcher for the Washington Nationals
- Kathleen Tankersley Young (1903–1933), American poet
- Jan Tankersley, American politician
- Leo Tankersley (1901–1980), American baseball catcher
- Mairehe Louise Tankersley, New Zealand social worker
- Paul Tankersley, fictional character in the Honorverse
- Richie Tankersley Cusick (born 1952), American author
- Samuel Tankersley Williams (1897–1984), American army general
- Taylor Tankersley (born 1983), American baseball pitcher for the New York Mets
