= Barbara Bloemink =

American art historian and curator

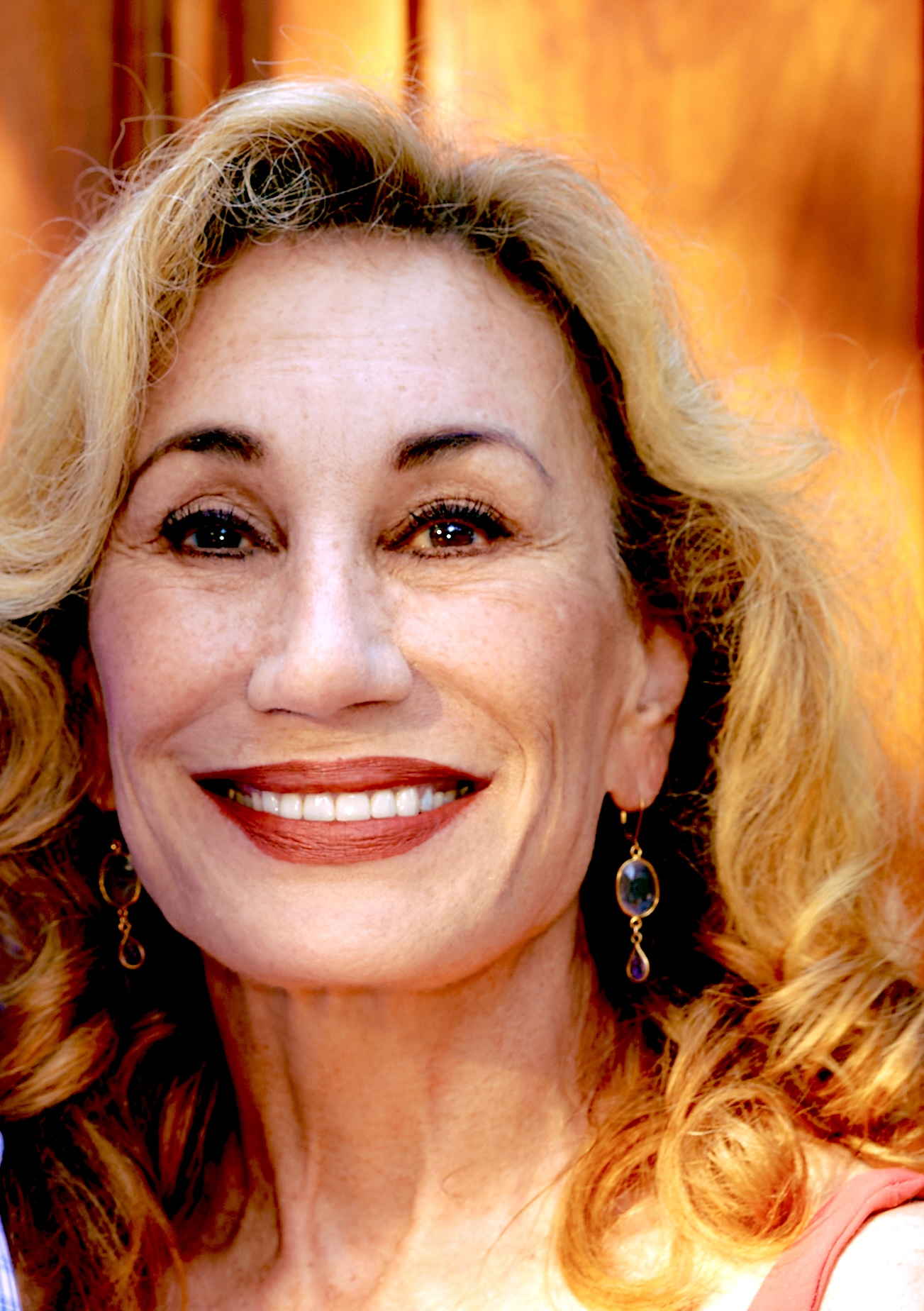
Bloemink in 2022

Barbara J. Bloemink (born 1953) is an American art historian, former museum director and curator, playwright, actor and author. She is a noted authority on the modernist painter Florine Stettheimer (1871–1944).

== Early life and education ==
Bloemink was born in 1953 to Doris, artist and art teacher, and Robert Heins, engineer. Her grandmother was also an artist and art teacher. The family lived abroad for much of her childhood, allowing her to gain an appreciation for art from a young age. The family subsequently lived in Rye, New York, where Bloemink graduated from White Plains High School. She attended Stanford University, earning a bachelor's degree (cum laude) in art history, and completed a master's degree in fine and decorative arts at the New York University Institute of Fine Arts, completing another master's in philosophy at Yale. In 1990, she began working on her PhD at Yale University. Her dissertation was published in 1995, as The Life and Art of Florine Stettheimer.

== Career ==
Bloemink worked at Sotheby's as a director for European paintings and on Madison Avenue, and subsequently as Head of European paintings for their Los Angeles Auction House. In 1988, she served as chief curator at the Hudson River Museum in Yonkers, New York, subsequently becoming the director of the museum.

Leaving to complete her PhD, in 1992 Bloemink also mounted an exhibit of Florine Stettheimer's works at the Katonah Museum of Art. During her studies, she served as an adjunct curator at both the Katonah and Mint Museums, respectively in Katonah, New York and Charlotte, North Carolina. Bloemink became the curator and director of the Kemper Museum of Contemporary Art in Kansas City, Missouri in 1994. In 1996, she returned to New York and curated an exhibition of contemporary art in Puebla, Mexico, authored reviews of contemporary Colombian art for ArtNexus and organized an exhibit on African-American art for the Katonah Museum.

Between 1997 and 1999, Bloemink was the curator and director of at the Virginia Museum of Contemporary Art in Virginia Beach, Virginia. She subsequently worked as the director at Hirschl & Adler Modern in New York, before serving as managing director of the Guggenheim-Hermitage and the Guggenheim Las Vegas Museums in Las Vegas, Nevada in 2001. Bloemink returned to New York City in 2002, to serve as the curatorial director of the Smithsonian's National Design Museum, Cooper-Hewitt.

Bloemink was a founding Board Member of Design Miami in 2003, participating in and moderating panels for Design Miami and ArtBasel Miami events. In 2007, she became deputy director of curatorial affairs at the Museum of Arts and Design in New York City and began working as an independent curator and museum consultant for the new Design Museum in Holon, Israel, where she co-curated the opening international exhibition. She has lectured globally and published books on various topics regarding art and design.

In 2010, Bloemink relocated to Snowmass Village, Colorado to work as the director of the Anderson Ranch Arts Center. As an adjunct professor Bloemink has taught courses in art history, museum studies and senior fine art seminars at the college and graduate level — including instructing at the University of Kansas, Kansas City, Missouri, the University of Brighton in England, the School of Visual Arts in New York City, and the University of Bezalel in Israel. She has served as a panelist for numerous international conferences and juried national art exhibitions. In 2015, Bloemink was a fellow at the BAU Foundation in Otranto, Italy and in 2016 served as a director of their Artists and Writers Residency program in Apulia.

=== Curatorial work ===
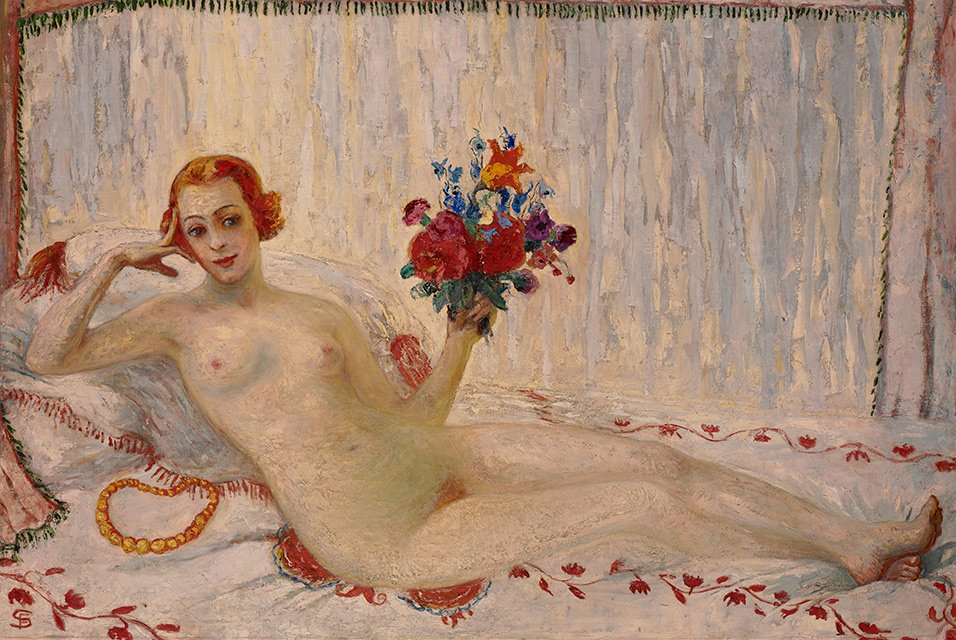
A Model (Nude Self-Portrait), 1915–16, oil on canvas by Florine Stettheimer, a recurring subject of Bloemink's writing

For over three decades, Bloemink has organized over eighty exhibitions of modernist and contemporary art and design internationally. These have included many one person exhibitions as well as group exhibitions.

==== Solo exhibitions ====
Among the solo artist exhibitions: "Florine Stettheimer: Manhattan Fantastica", Whitney Museum of American Art, 1995; "Guerrilla Girls: Posters of Protest", Kemper Museum, 1996; "Deborah Kass: My Andy, A Retrospective", Kemper Museum, 1996; "Michael Lucero: Influences & Contexts", traveling exhibit, 1996; "Christian Boltanski: So Far", Kemper Museum, 1998; "James Croak: Twenty-Five Year Survey", Contemporary Art Center of Virginia, 1998; "Yinka Shonibare Selects Works from the Permanent Collection", Cooper-Hewitt National Design Museum, 2005; and "Esteban Lisa: Playing with Lines and Colors", Museum of Latin American Art, 2012.

The 1995 exhibit on Stettheimer was noted for having largely rediscovered the artist's work, which had not been widely exhibited since 1946. The essays, written by Bloemink and Elisabeth Sussman for the exhibition catalogue, examined Stettheimer's career and the interwar years in New York City from a feminist perspective. The essays attempted to open the artist's work to explorations which not only reinstated her place in art history, but to broaden the context of its interpretation into postmodern relevance. The exhibition was described as showing the artist's wit as well as her ferocity, not only in the subject matter she chose to paint, but also in the garish, bold colors she preferred. The Guerilla Girls' 1996 exhibition featured posters aimed at uncovering discrimination in the art world. Kass's retrospective held later that year, derided the male-dominated iconography of pop art, parodying Andy Warhol's style with feminist messaging. Art critic Alice Thorson noted the unmistakable imprint of Bloemink's curation of Kass's exhibition.

The Lucero exhibit, co-curated by Bloemink and Mark Richard Leach, opened at the Mint Museum of Art in Charlotte, and then traveled to the American Craft Museum in New York City, the Kemper Museum in Kansas City, Missouri, the Smithsonian National Museum of American Art in Washington, D.C., and the Carnegie Museum of Art in Pittsburgh, Pennsylvania. Featuring an unconventional style, Lucero's work defied being classed as either ceramics or sculpture, though it was predominantly made of clay. Face jugs, hybrid animals, and found items in mixed-media attempted to address current events and explore traditions in new ways. For example, a found item, an antique stroller, was presented to provoke thought on recycling. Bloemink discussed in the event catalogue, the influences of Dada and surrealism in Lucero's works. The exhibit held in 1998 of Boltanski's work was organized by Bloemink prior to her leaving the Kemper Museum. The exhibit featured works by the artist from 1980 through the present. Boltanski used ordinary objects, like photographs, clothing, newspaper clippings, and household items to explore the history behind people's identity. Some of the works featured memorials to Holocaust victims, while his work Les Ombres used hanging skeletons to project shadows on walls.

Croak's 1998 exhibit was the first retrospective exhibition of his work. His works use unusual media, such as skins, dirt, and resins to examine the environment, evolution, human nature, and cultural values. In 2004, Bloemink hired a group of guest curators to work with her on a series of exhibits. One of these, British-Nigerian artist Shonibare, selected for the 2005 to 2006 exhibition objects from the Cooper-Hewitt collection combining items from the Americas to Asia, spanning multiple centuries and continents to explore the idea of travel. The 2012 retrospective exhibition on the works of Lisa, featured the artist's works from 1930 to 1970 and was the first solo presentation of his art in the United States. It was co-curated by Barbara Bloemink and Jorge Virgili. Bloemink had introduced Lisa, an Argentine modernist and one of the first abstract artists in Latin America, with an exhibition at Hirschl & Adler Gallery in 2000.

==== Multi-artist exhibitions ====
Group exhibitions organized and/or co-curated by Bloemink cover a broad spectrum. For example, "A Natural Order: The Experience of Landscape in Contemporary Sculpture" appeared at the Hudson River Museum of Art, Yonkers, New York, in 1990. The exhibit, which included an array of international artists, explored the importance of art in preserving images of the natural environment through time, noting that future generations may not be able to see the same habitats. "Re-Righting History: Counter-Narratives by Contemporary African-American Artists", was shown at the Katonah Museum of Art, Katonah, New York, in 1999. It evaluated the omission of African-American experiences from the historic record and national narrative. Presenting the work of nineteen artists, Bloemink curated an event which wove images of slavery's impact on families, with the stereotypical depictions of black life as represented in cinema, lynchings and mixed-media works which examine defining social attitudes towards Black Americans throughout history. Bloemink was co-curator with Vicky A. Clark of "Comic Release: Negotiating Identity for a New Generation", which toured after opening at the Pittsburgh Contemporary Art Center, Pittsburgh, Pennsylvania in 2003. The traveling exhibit explored the questions of class, gender, and race, through artistic works of artists typically known for drawing cartoons or for comic books, and graffiti work.

Other group exhibitions curated by Bloemink include "Design ≠Art: Functional Sculpture from Donald Judd to Rachel Whiteread" co-curated with Joseph Cunningham for the Smithsonian National Design Museum, New York City, in 2004. The exhibit explored the crossover between function, design, and art. Presenting works by varied artists, the minimalist approach of unadorned pieces, allowed viewers to determine if each work was merely functional, like a piece of furniture, or sculpture, for ornamentation. "Fashion in Colors", was organized by Bloemink for the Smithsonian National Design Museum in 2006. It explored how color and its underlying meaning in different time periods was reflected in the fashions of varying eras. For example, in the seventeenth century, black denoted conservatism and respectability, whereas from the 1960s, it came to represent subcultural rebellion, such as in the dress of beatniks, punks, and goths. Each room of the exhibit focused on a different color with clothing in the same color providing social meaning. The 2006 exhibition, "Frederic Church, Winslow Homer, and Thomas Moran: Tourism and the American Landscape" was hosted by the Smithsonian National Design Museum. Bloemink and the other curators explored the impact of the artists in shaping the American identity how Americans and tourists saw the country. Though Church, Homer, and Moran were known for beautiful landscapes and character studies, each of them had images used in advertising, to illustrate newspaper and magazine articles, and for stereoscopes, solidifying American values and marketing them to a wider audience. "The State of Things: International Design Triennial", was the inaugural exhibition of the Contemporary Design Museum, Holon, Israel. Opening in 2010, the exhibit, held in a new facility designed by Ron Arad and curated by Bloemink and others, looked at design showcasing current technology as it impacts humans in a world in which many experience helplessness, greed, loneliness, and war.

=== Writing ===
In addition to numerous books on early twentieth century and artists, topics exploring art history and contemporary art and design, Bloemink has published numerous international catalog essays, magazine, newspaper, and on-line articles on modernist and contemporary art and design in several media. A number have to do with the artist Florine Stettheimer, such as her chapter, "Florine Stettheimer: Hiding in Plain Sight" in Naomi Sawelson-Gorse's Women in Dada and "Crystal Flowers, Pink Candy Hearts, and Tinsel Creation: The Subversive Femininity of Florine Stettheimer" in Bridget Elliott and Janice Helland's Women Artists and the Decorative Arts, 1880–1935: The Gender of Ornament. A review of her 1995 The Life and Art of Florence Stettheimer in Art Journal said that she "rescues [Stettheimer's] work from frothy, faux naif, interpretations and unequivocally positions it within advance currents of art and thought". By careful examination of the works and in-depth research, Bloemink recreated the artist's circle of friends to give a clearer picture of the influences from notations in Settheimer's diaries and letters. Art historian and gender specialist Wendy Slatkin called Bloemink "the leading scholar" on Stettheimer. Her 2022 book Florine Stettheimer: A Biography was listed by The New Yorker as one of "The Best Books of 2022...".

Acting and Playwriting

In 2014 Bloemink studied acting at Stella Adler acting conservatory and the Royal Academy for Dramatic Arts in London. In 2021 she performed the role of Boyet in their production of William Shakespeare's Love's Labour's Lost with the Hudson Classical Theater Company in New York City and served on their Advisory Board. She also performed the role of Tracey in Lynn Nottage's Lynn Nottage's Sweat with Ghostlight Productions in Staten Island, New York. Bloemink's play, which she wrote in 2022, Art & Money: The Rise and Fall of the Rothschild Museum in Las Vegas was chosen for the New York Theater Festival and performed on June 12, 14, and 17th at Theatro Latino in New York City, directed by Eduardo Machado. In December 2023, she performed the part of Martha in Edward Albee's Who's Afraid of Virginia Woolf at Seaview Playwrights Theater in Staten Island. She has performed various roles in theaters in Connecticut including with the Flock Company in New London and at the Granite Theater in Westerly, Rhode Island. www.thewesterlysun.com/lifestyle/entertainmment/review-graniteesharvey-a-sweet-funny-and-tender-version-of-the-american-classic/article_a5d58c3c-6a06-11ef-989d-e3a3d3233f63.html

== Selected publications ==
- Florine Stettheimer: A Biography, (Hirmer Publishers, January 5, 2022: ISBN 3777438340)
- Design Does Not Equal Art: Functional Objects from Donald Judd to Rachel Whiteread, (Merrell Publishers Ltd, September 17, 2004) ASIN: BO13PRN1UU
- Element 47: The Art Collection, (Marquand Books, January 27, 2015: ISBN 0692222006)
- Spill: Daniel Beltrá & The Gulf Horizon Oil Spill (GOST Books, March 17, 2015: ISBN 0957427247
- With Soon Chun Cho, The Color of Nature: Monochrome Art in Korea (Assouline, September 2008: ISBN 2759403157)
- With Lolis Elie and Claire Tancons, Prospect 1: New Orleans (PictureBox, November 1, 2008: ISBN 0981562299)
- With Vicky Clark, Comic Release: Negotiating Identity for a New Generation, (D.A.P./Distributed Art Publishers, 2002: ISBN 1891024604)
- With Cynthia Smith, Design for the Other 90%, (Editions Assouline, May 15, 2007: ISBN 0910503974)
- With Soon Chun Cho, Empty the Mind: The Art of Park Seo-Bo (Assouline, September 15, 2008: ISBN 2759403149)
- With Mark Leach, Michael Lucero: Sculpture 1976–1995 (Hudson Hills, March 13, 1996: ISBN 1555951260)
- The Life and Art of Florine Stettheimer (Yale University Press, August 30, 1995: ISBN 0300063407
- With Elizabeth Sussman, Florine Stettheimer: Manhattan Fantastica (Whitney Museum of American Art, September 1, 1995: ISBN 0810968150)
- With Gail Collins, Re-Righting History: Contemporary African American Artists (Katonah Museum of Art, January 1, 1999: ISBN 0915171511)
