= Kathleen Young =

Kathleen Young may refer to:

- Kathleen Baxter (1901–1988), née Young, English women's rights activist
- Kathleen Tankersley Young (1902–1933), American writer, poet, and editor
