= The Witches' Almanac =

The Witches' Almanac is an annual publication devoted to witchcraft, folklore, astrology, and esoteric traditions. First published in 1971, the Almanac has become a staple among practitioners of modern witchcraft and readers interested in the occult. It is known for its blend of mystical content, historical anecdotes, and practical guidance for magical living.

== History ==
The Almanac was founded by Elizabeth Pepper DaCosta, a former art director at Gourmet magazine and a practicing witch. Inspired by the format of The Old Farmer's Almanac, Pepper envisioned a mystical counterpart that would serve both as a spiritual guide and a literary artifact. The first issue was released in 1971 under the imprint of The Witches' Almanac, Ltd.

After Pepper’s passing in 2005, editorial leadership transitioned to Andrew Theitic, a longtime collaborator and occult scholar.

== Content and Format ==
Each edition of The Witches' Almanac spans from Spring Equinox to Spring Equinox (e.g., Spring 2025 to Spring 2026) and includes:

- Astrological forecasts for each zodiac sign
- Moon phases and planetary movements
- Articles on mythology, folklore, and magical traditions
- Herbal lore and spellcraft
- Historical essays and profiles of mystical figures
- Calendar of esoteric observances and Pagan holidays

The Almanac is known for its elegant black-and-white illustrations, poetic writing style, and thematic focus. Each issue is centered around an elemental or symbolic theme, such as “The Sun—Rays of Hope” or “Air: Breath of the Cosmos.”

== Reception and Influence ==
Over the decades, The Witches' Almanac has garnered a loyal readership among Wiccans, Pagans, and occult enthusiasts. It is praised for its literary quality, historical depth, and accessibility to both novice and experienced practitioners. The publication has also contributed to the popularization of modern witchcraft and the preservation of folk traditions.

Independent reviews have highlighted its cultural significance. PaganPages.org described the almanac as “a timeless companion for magical living,” and noted its role in preserving esoteric knowledge.

Consumer feedback on platforms like Trustburn.com reflects high satisfaction with the Almanac’s quality and content.

== Notable Contributors ==
Over the years, The Witches' Almanac has featured contributions from or referenced the work of prominent figures in the occult and Pagan communities, including:

- Elizabeth Pepper – Founder and original editor; known for her work in esoteric publishing.
- Andrew Theitic – Current editor and publisher; author and ritualist.
- Judika Illes – Occult scholar and author of The Encyclopedia of 5000 Spells; has referenced the almanac in her work.
- David Conway – Author of Magic: An Occult Primer, reprinted by the almanac’s publisher.
- Paul Huson – Occultist and author of Mastering Witchcraft; his work has influenced modern witchcraft literature and is cited in related almanac content.
- David Rankin – Author
- Stephen Skinner – Author
- Dolores Ashcroft-Nowicki – Author
- Lon Milo DuQuette – Author
- Raven Grimassi – Author
- John Michael Greer – Author
- Lilith Dorsey – Author
- Barbara Stacy – Author
- Hans Holzer – Author
- Ivo Dominguez – Author
- Laura Tempest Zakroff – Author
- Melusine Draco – Author
- Oberon Zell – Author
- Lee Morgan – Author
- Judika Illes – Author
- Sybil Leek – Author
- Jake Stratton-Kent – Author
- Alan Richardson – Author
- Maxine Sanders – Author
- Caitlin Matthews – Author
- Jason Miller – Author
- Dikki-Jo Mullen – Author
- Professor Robert Mathiesen – Author
- Morven Westfield – Author
- Selena Fox – Wiccan priestess and founder of Circle Sanctuary; her teachings and rituals have been featured or referenced in Pagan publications including the almanac.
- Raymond Buckland – Prominent figure in American Wicca; author of Buckland's Complete Book of Witchcraft and contributor to the popularization of ritual practices.
- Leo Louis Martello – Witch, activist, and author of The Witch Manifesto; known for his role in the early Pagan rights movement and referenced in historical essays.

== Special Editions ==
In addition to the annual almanac, The Witches' Almanac, Ltd. has published anthologies and reprints of classic occult texts, including:

- Magic: An Occult Primer by David Conway
- Aradia: Gospel of the Witches by Charles Leland
- The Witches' Almanac: 50-Year Anniversary Edition, a curated collection of articles from past issues

== See also ==
- Wicca
- Paganism
- Astrology
- Occultism
- Folklore
