= Vicky A. Clark =

American art historian

Vicky A. Clark (born December 19, 1950) is an American independent curator of contemporary art, art historian, and writer based in Pittsburgh, Pennsylvania.

== Early life and education ==
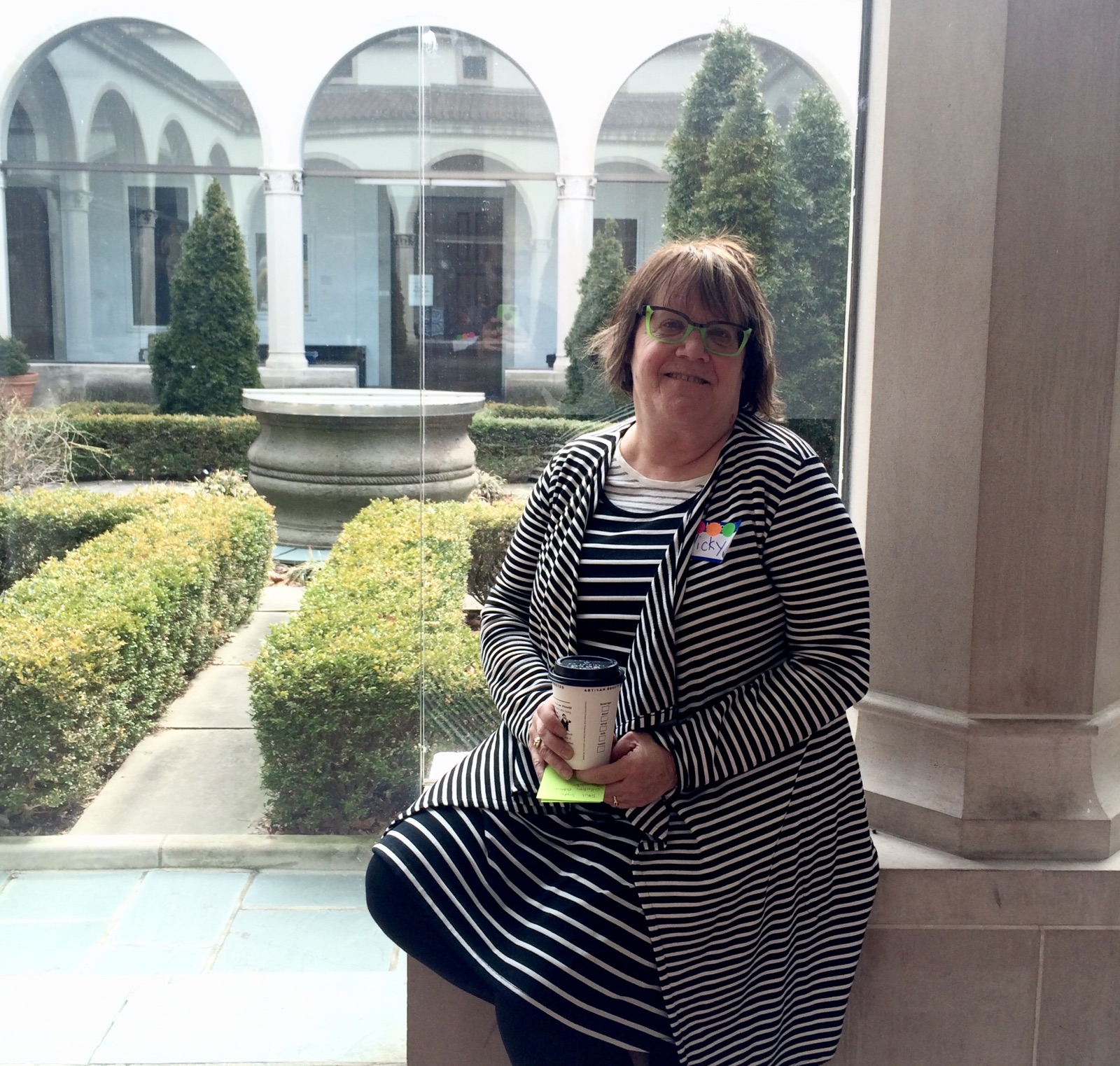
Vicky A. Clark at the 2016 Art + Feminism Wikipedia Edit-A-Thon at the Frick Fine Arts Library in Pittsburgh, PA.

Born in Atlanta, Georgia, Clark moved to Santa Monica, California, at the age of 10. She attended Santa Monica High School, before attending UCLA and majoring in Art History. Graduating in 1972, she then attended UC Davis for her master's degree in Art History, and went on to receive her Ph.D. in Art History from the University of Michigan.

== Publications ==
Clark's writings include a book on Robert Qualters, Pennsylvania Artist of the Year in 2014, entitled Robert Qualters: Autobiographical Mythologies (University of Pittsburgh Press).

== Exhibitions ==
- Recycling Art History at the Pittsburgh Center for the Arts, 1998
- Comic Release: Negotiating Identity for a New Generation (co-curated with Barbara Bloemink), Armory Center for the Arts, Pasadena, 2004
- Invisible Threads at Clarion University, 2009
- The White Show: Subtlety in the Age of Spectacle at Clarion University, 2011
- Coming Attractions, Lawrenceville, 2014
