= Florine Stettheimer =

American painter (1871–1944)

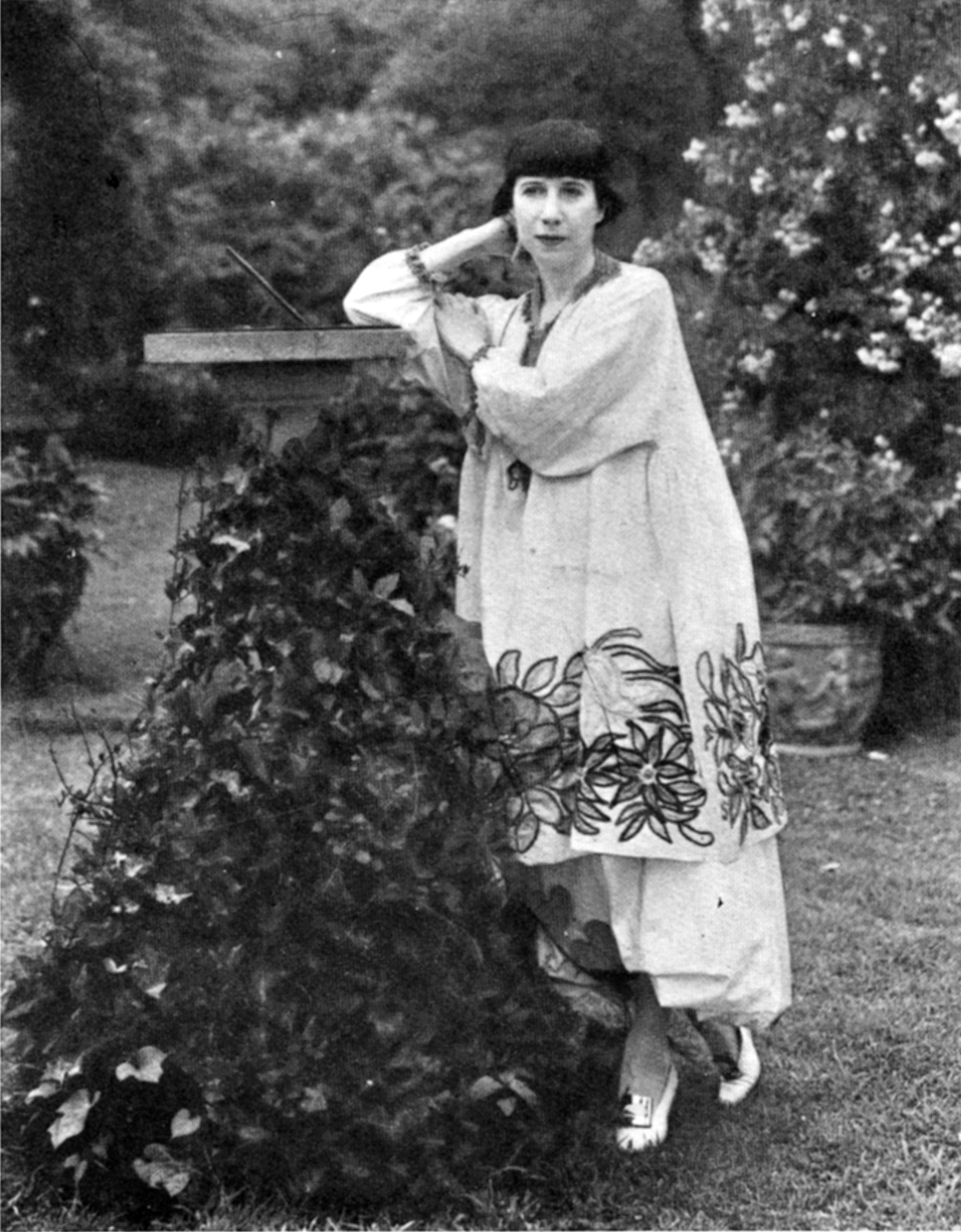
- Stettheimer in Bryant Park c. 1917–1920
- Born: August 19, 1871; Rochester, New York, U.S.
- Died: May 11, 1944 (aged 72); New York, New York, U.S.
- Education: Art Students League of New York
- Known for: Painting

Florine Stettheimer (August 19, 1871 – May 11, 1944) was an American modernist painter, feminist, theatrical designer, poet, and salonnière.

Stettheimer developed a feminine, theatrical painting style depicting her friends, family, and experiences in New York City. She made the first feminist nude self-portrait and paintings depicting controversies of race and sexuality. She and her sisters hosted a salon that attracted members of the avant-garde. In the mid-1930s, Stettheimer created the stage designs and costumes for Gertrude Stein and Virgil Thomson's avant-garde opera, Four Saints in Three Acts. She is best known for her four monumental works illustrating what she considered New York City's "Cathedrals": Broadway, Wall Street, Fifth Avenue, and New York's three major art museums.

During her lifetime, Stettheimer exhibited her paintings at more than 40 museum exhibitions and salons in New York and Paris. In 1938, when the Museum of Modern Art sent the first American art exhibition to Europe, Stettheimer and Georgia O'Keeffe were the only women whose work was included. Following her death in 1944, her friend Marcel Duchamp curated a retrospective exhibition of her work at the Museum of Modern Art in 1946. It was the museum's first retrospective exhibition of work by a woman artist. After her death, Stettheimer's paintings were donated to museums throughout the United States. In addition to her many paintings and costume and set designs, Stettheimer designed custom frames for her paintings and matching furniture, and wrote humorous, often biting poetry. A book of her poetry, Crystal Flowers, was published privately and posthumously by her sister Ettie Stettheimer in 1949.

== Early life and education ==
Florine Stettheimer was born in Rochester, New York, on August 19, 1871. Her mother, Rosetta Walter, was one of nine daughters from a wealthy German-Jewish family in New York. Stettheimer's father, Joseph, had five children with Rosetta Walter but deserted his family for Australia. Stettheimer grew up between New York City and Europe, in a matriarchal family. By the time Stettheimer was ten, Rosetta and her five children spent part of every year in Europe. By the early 1890s, two of Rosetta's children, Stella and Walter, had married and left the household. Caroline (Carrie), the next eldest, Florine, and Henrietta (Ettie), the youngest, formed a close bond with their mother until she died in 1935.

Stettheimer demonstrated artistic talent as a child. From 1881 to 1886, when she was ten to fifteen, she attended Stuttgart's Priesersches Institut, a girls' boarding school. She took private art instruction with the director, Sophie von Prieser. The Stettheimers lived in Berlin from 1887 to 1889, where Stettheimer continued taking private drawing lessons. Regularly traveling through Europe with her mother, Carrie, and Ettie, Stettheimer taught herself art history by visiting museums and art galleries in Italy, France, Spain, and Germany. She studied the Old Masters, and critiqued their work in her diaries, and she continued to take private art lessons in media such as casein.

In 1892, Stettheimer enrolled in a four-year program at the Art Students League in New York, a school modeled on the private art schools of Paris. While in Germany, she learned the style of German academic painting. At the Art Students League, she studied with teachers such as Kenyon Cox, Harry Siddons Mowbray, and James Carroll Beckwith, who had studied French academic painting in Paris. By graduation, she had mastered painting realistic, traditional, academic portraiture and nudes in both of the primary European styles.

Returning to Europe, Stettheimer visited museum collections, contemporary salon exhibitions, and artists' studios. She saw the work of the Cubists, Cézanne, Manet, van Gogh, Morisot, and Matisse years before the Armory Show, the first large exhibition of modern art in America. With varying success, she tried her hand at a variety of media and styles, from Symbolism and Fauvism to Pointillism, resulting in a series of works that are reminiscent of Matisse's Luxe, Calme et Volupté.

== Early opera set designs ==
The performances of Serge Diaghilev's Ballets Russes in Paris in 1912 were a key influence on Stettheimer's painting. Captivated with the staging and choreography of the Ballets Russes, she created the libretto, costumes, and sets for an opera of her own: Orphée des Quat'z Arts. She based the libretto on the annual art students' Bal des Quat'z'Arts. The resulting maquettes, with their costumed characters made from intricately sewn and beaded materials, display theatrical, active, dance-like movements and individualized personalities that prefigure her mature paintings that emerged in 1917. While working on Orphée, she still painted conventional landscapes and portraits.

Many of the female figures in Orphée wore a newly-invented transparent material: cellophane. The use of cellophane became the hallmark of her interior design, and, two decades later, the stage sets for the opera Four Saints in Three Acts. Orphée des Quat'z Arts has never been staged. The libretto was published in its entirety in biographer Barbara Bloemink's The Life and Art of Florine Stettheimer and the 2010 reissue of Crystal Flowers.

== Return to New York and the Stettheimer salon ==
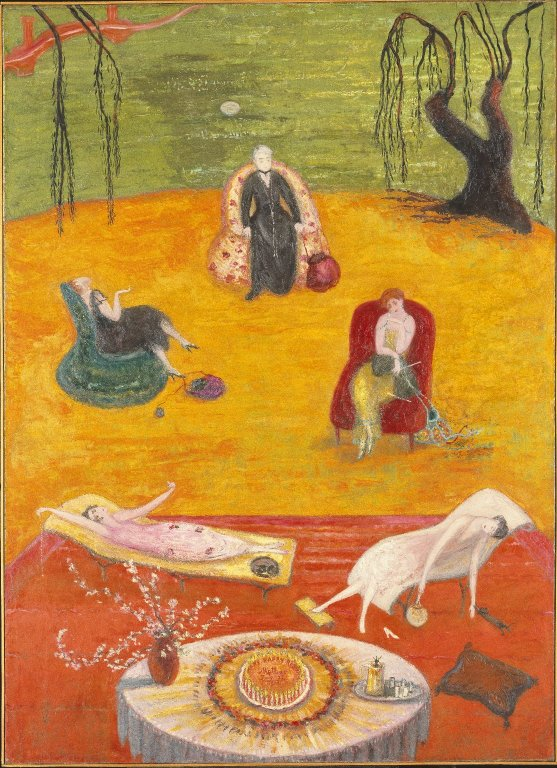
Heat, c. 1919, oil on canvas

In 1914, the Stettheimers were stranded in Bern, Switzerland, by the outbreak of World War I, and eventually boarded a ship for New York. On returning to New York harbor, Stettheimer decided to reject her traditional academic training and create a new painting style, capturing the immediate, expressive emotions she felt on seeing the sights, sounds, and people of 20th-century New York City. The four Stettheimer women moved into an apartment on West 76th Street in Manhattan, where they began holding salons, inviting recent expatriate artists such as Marcel Duchamp, Albert Gleizes, and Francis Picabia, as well as members of Alfred Stieglitz's circle, such as Marsden Hartley and Georgia O'Keeffe, and other musicians, writers, poets, dancers, and members of New York's avant-garde.

A unique aspect of the Stettheimer salon was that their numerous gay, bisexual, and lesbian friends and acquaintances did not need to disguise their sexual orientation at the gatherings as they did at other salons (such as the Arensberg Salon), despite the fact that non-heterosexual relationships were illegal in New York at the time. Stettheimer often previewed her newest paintings to her friends at her salons, as in her painting Soirée (1917–19), prior to sending them to exhibitions. Stettheimer's older sister Carrie created special cocktails and dishes, such as feather soup, for the salons. During the summers, the Stettheimers often held day-long, salon-like parties for friends at rented summer houses. Stettheimer painted a number of these gatherings of her family members and friends enjoying outdoor festivities, including Sunday Afternoon in the Country (1917).

== Mature painting style ==
During her lifetime Stettheimer had only one solo exhibition, at Knoedler in 1916. It was organized by painter Albert Sterner's wife, Marie Sterner, one of the first women gallerists in America, who worked at Knoedler and acted as an intermediary between the artist and the gallery. The show consisted of a number of the artist's early Matisse-derivative works, painted with bright, pure colors, thick impasto, and heavy contours. (Note: The works in the show included Portrait of Andre Brook, Front View (1915), Portrait of Andre Brook, Back View (1915), Spring (1907), Jenny and Genevieve (1915), and Flowers with a Parrot (1916)) When nothing sold, she was, as her friend the art critic Henry McBride noted, "vaguely dissatisfied." In the year that followed, Stettheimer's style evolved to an idiosyncratic visual language, rejecting both traditional formalism and modernist abstraction. Stettheimer transformed her painting style by returning to the miniaturized, theatrical, colorful influence of her designs for Orphee des Quat'z Arts. In Stettheimer's mature work, each canvas is arranged like a stage, filled with easily identifiable family members, friends, and acquaintances. Her use of what Duchamp called multiplication virtuelle (continuous narrative) was highly sophisticated, with roots in the Ballets Russes and the ideas of Henri Bergson and Marcel Proust about time and memory.

In all her paintings but the portraits, Stettheimer filled her painting with bright, often unmixed, primary colors against a flat white background, often using various media. Many contain numerous small, highly detailed, humorous touches. Among the distinctive features of her paintings is the biting humor evident in many compositions' small narrative details, like the small altar boy trying to peek under the bride's gown in Cathedrals of Fifth Avenue (1931). Stettheimer also filled her compositions with visual performances of individually recognizable figures, arranged around actual prominent locations and detailed, accurately rendered, well-known architecture.

=== The 1920s ===
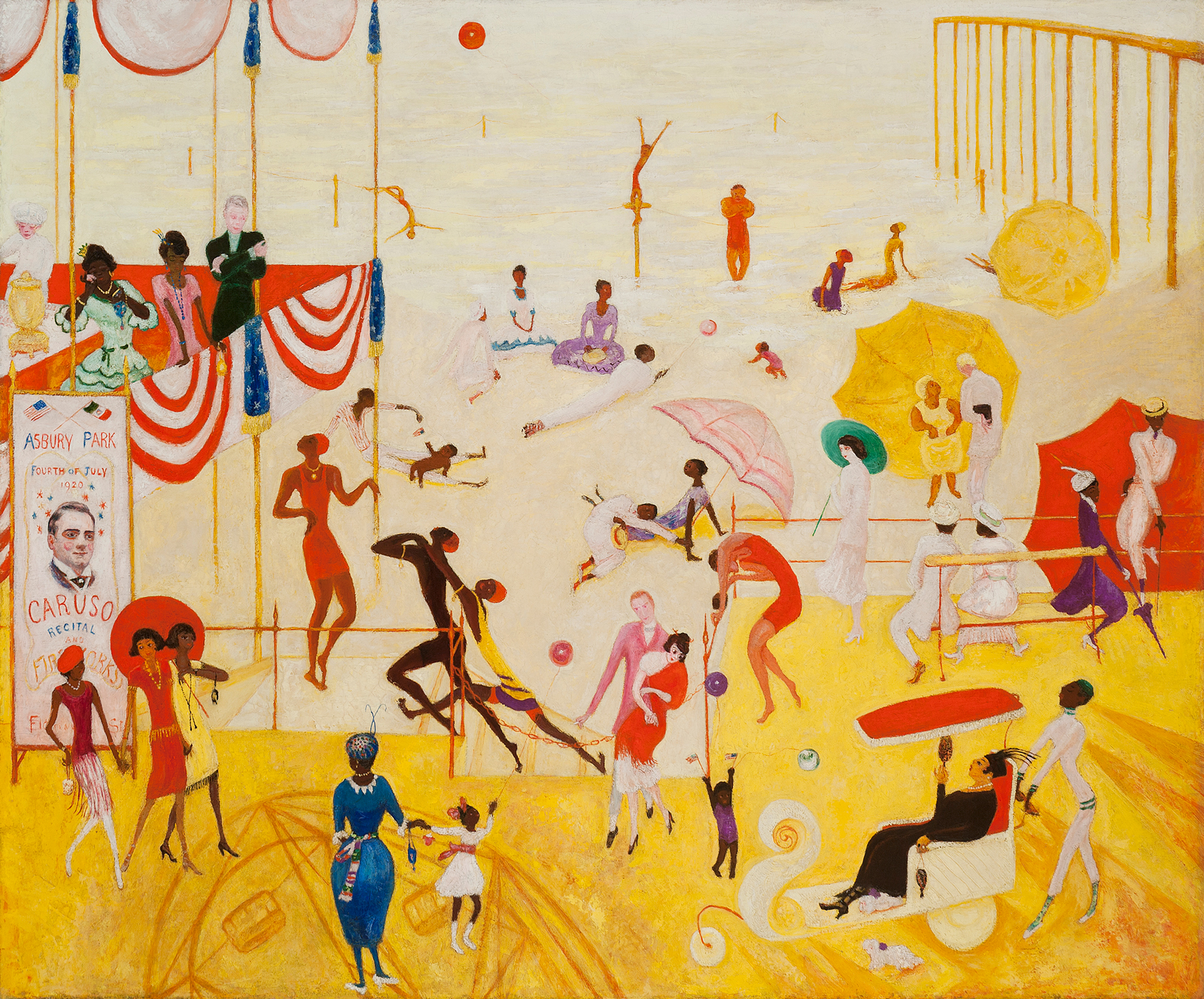
Asbury Park, 1920, oil on canvas

The 1920s were Stettheimer's most prolific period. She painted a number of individual portraits of male friends and herself and family. Like her literary contemporaries Proust and Gertrude Stein, instead of trying to reproduce what the sitter looked like, Stettheimer's portraits reveal their sitter's personality through illustrating a mixture of their habits, vocations, accomplishments, and contexts. In her Portrait of Marcel Duchamp and Rrose Sélavy, for example, she included images of a number of his "readymades," as well as his feminine alter ego, Rrose Sélavy. Barbara Bloemink has proposed that Duchamp based his persona as Rrose Sélavy in the well-known 1920-21 photography by Man Ray on Stettheimer. The artist also painted individual portraits of her sisters and her mother, and a self-portrait in which she is wearing an artist's beret, transparent cellophane-wrapped sheath, and red-winged cape and is floating upward towards the sun.

Stettheimer also painted several monumental works dealing with controversial subjects, such as Asbury Park South, which shows African-Americans enjoying a well-known, segregated New Jersey beach. The painting is remarkable in that it is among the earliest work by a white American artist to paint black figures with the same non-caricatured features as the Caucasian figures. In Lake Placid (1919), Stettheimer painted herself and friends of various religions (including Jews and Catholics) enjoying a day at Lake Placid, a site known for its institutionalized anti-Semitism. Recalling the premiere of a controversial Ballets Russes performance Stettheimer saw in Paris in 1912, in Music, Stettheimer painted herself asleep, dreaming of the dancer Nijinsky, en pointe, with the body of both a man and a woman.

=== The 1930s ===
During the 1930s, Stettheimer continued to paint large works, some of which were increasingly introspective and returned to her familial subject matter and locations. She continued to paint a floral still-life each year on her birthday that she referred to as an "eyegay," a play on the word "nosegay" (small bouquet) and her dislike of any "symbolism" in art. She spent much of her time during this decade on her designs for the opera Four Saints in Three Acts and two of her Cathedral paintings.

==== Cathedral paintings ====
Beginning in 1929, and continuing until the mid-1940s, Stettheimer painted four monumental works she titled Cathedral paintings. She commemorated in these what she considered the main "secular shrines" of New York City: the new theater and movie districts of Times Square and Broadway; Wall Street as the center of finance and politics; Fifth Avenue's upper-class stores and society; and the elitism and in-fighting among New York's three major art museums, the Museum of Modern Art, the Metropolitan Museum of Art, and the Whitney Museum of American Art. She continued to work on The Cathedrals of Art until a few weeks before she died. It remains unfinished. All four paintings are on display at the Metropolitan Museum of Art.

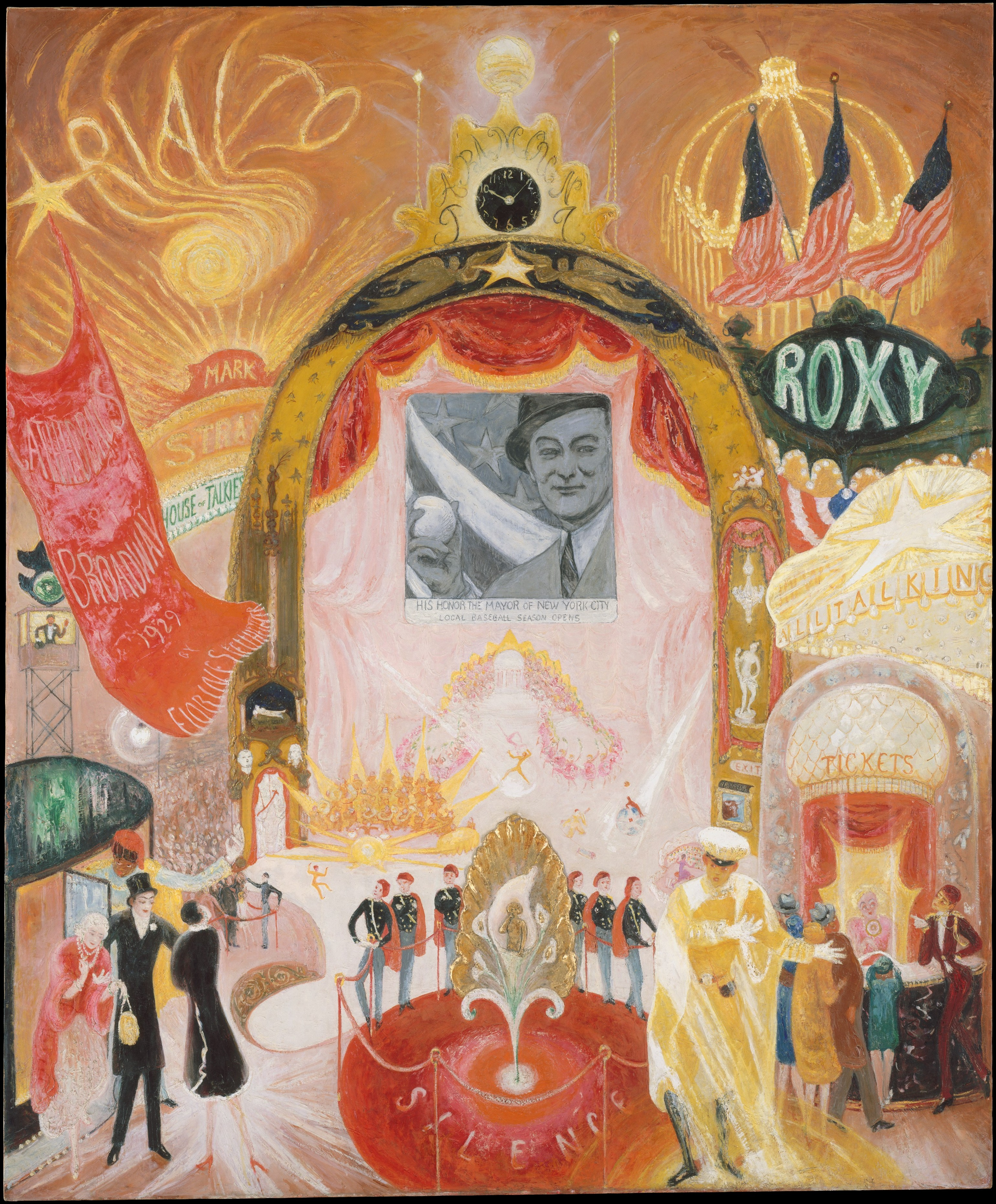
The Cathedrals of Broadway, 1929, oil on canvas

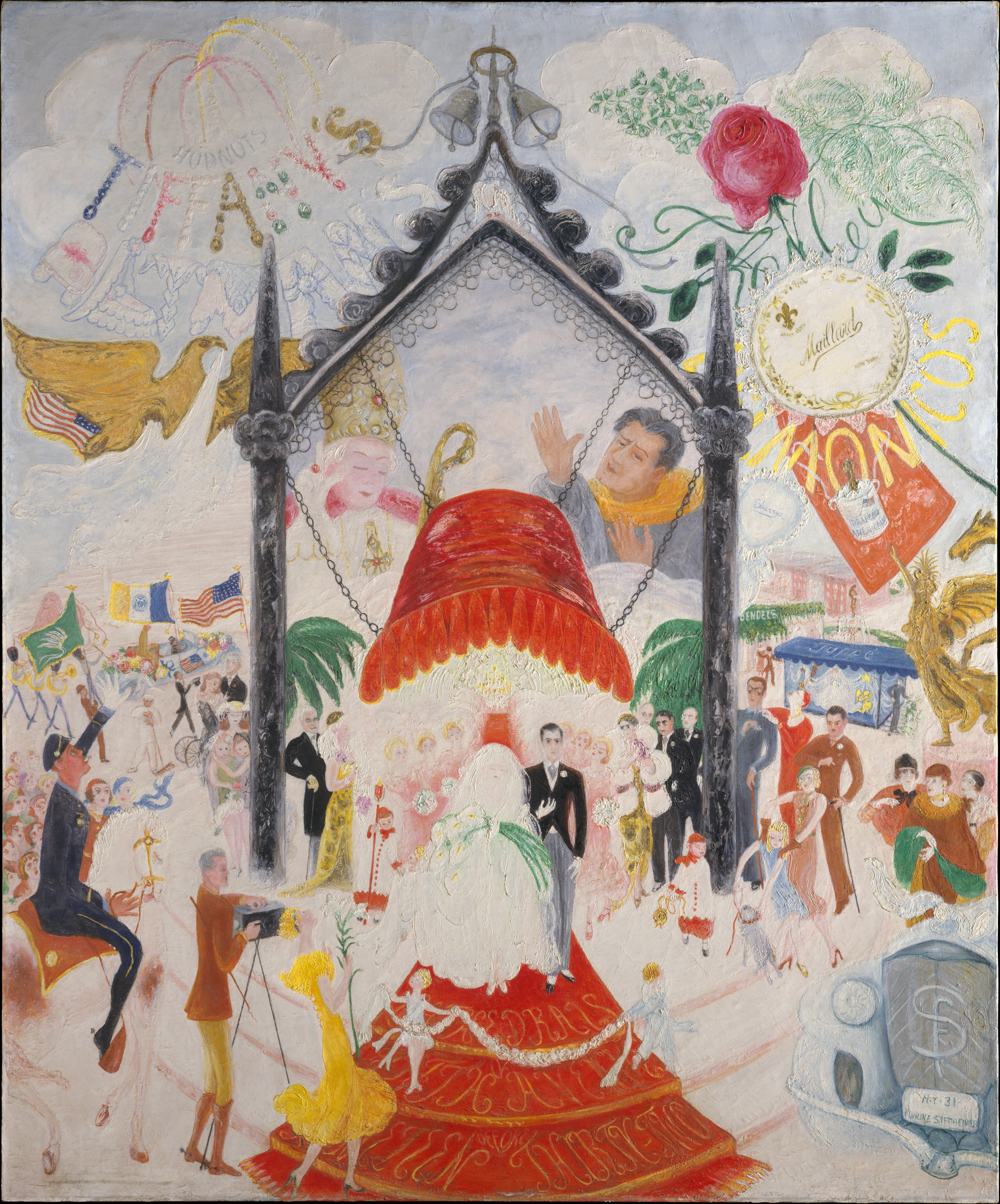
The Cathedrals of Fifth Avenue, 1931, oil on canvas

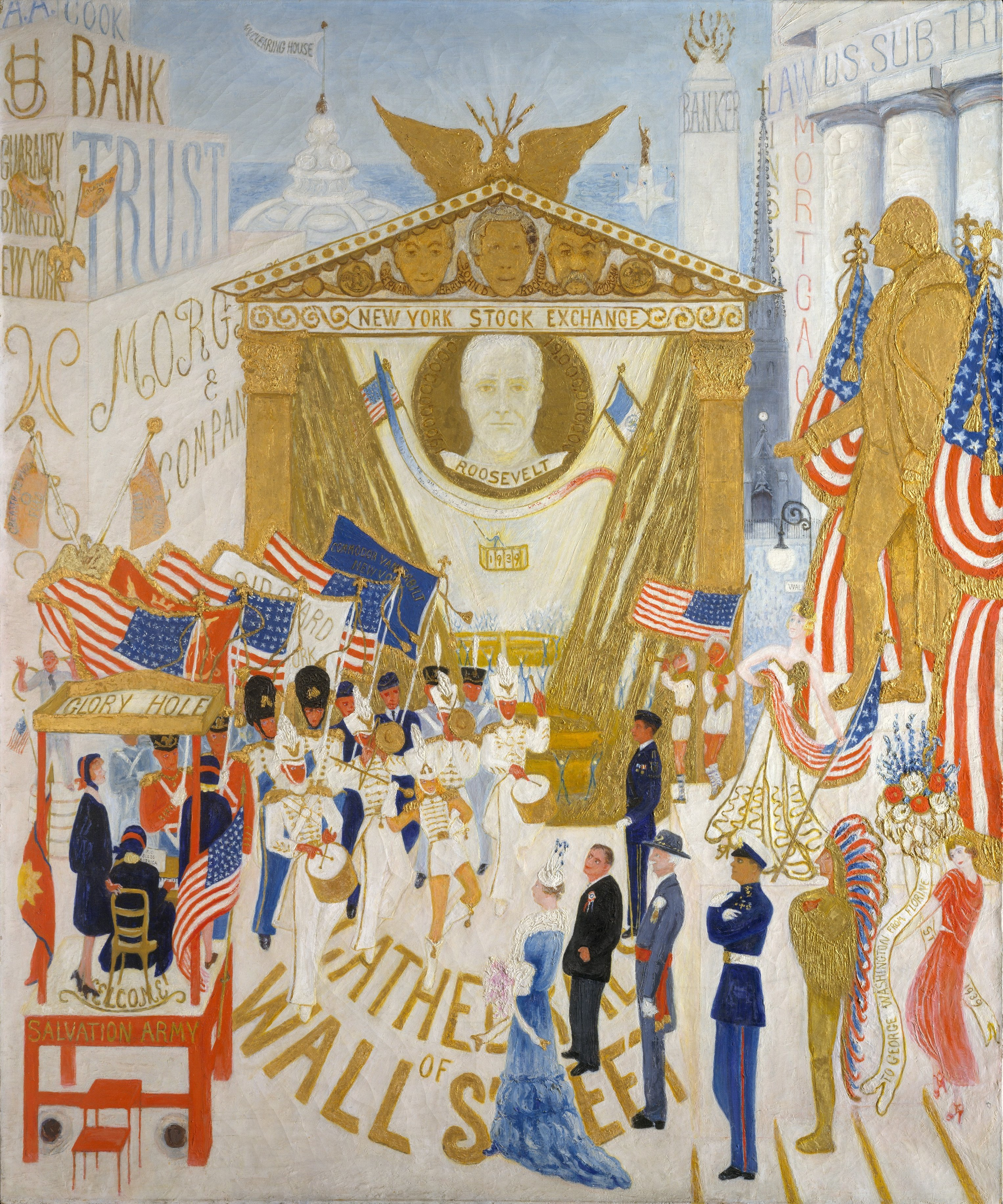
The Cathedrals of Wall Street, 1939, oil on canvas

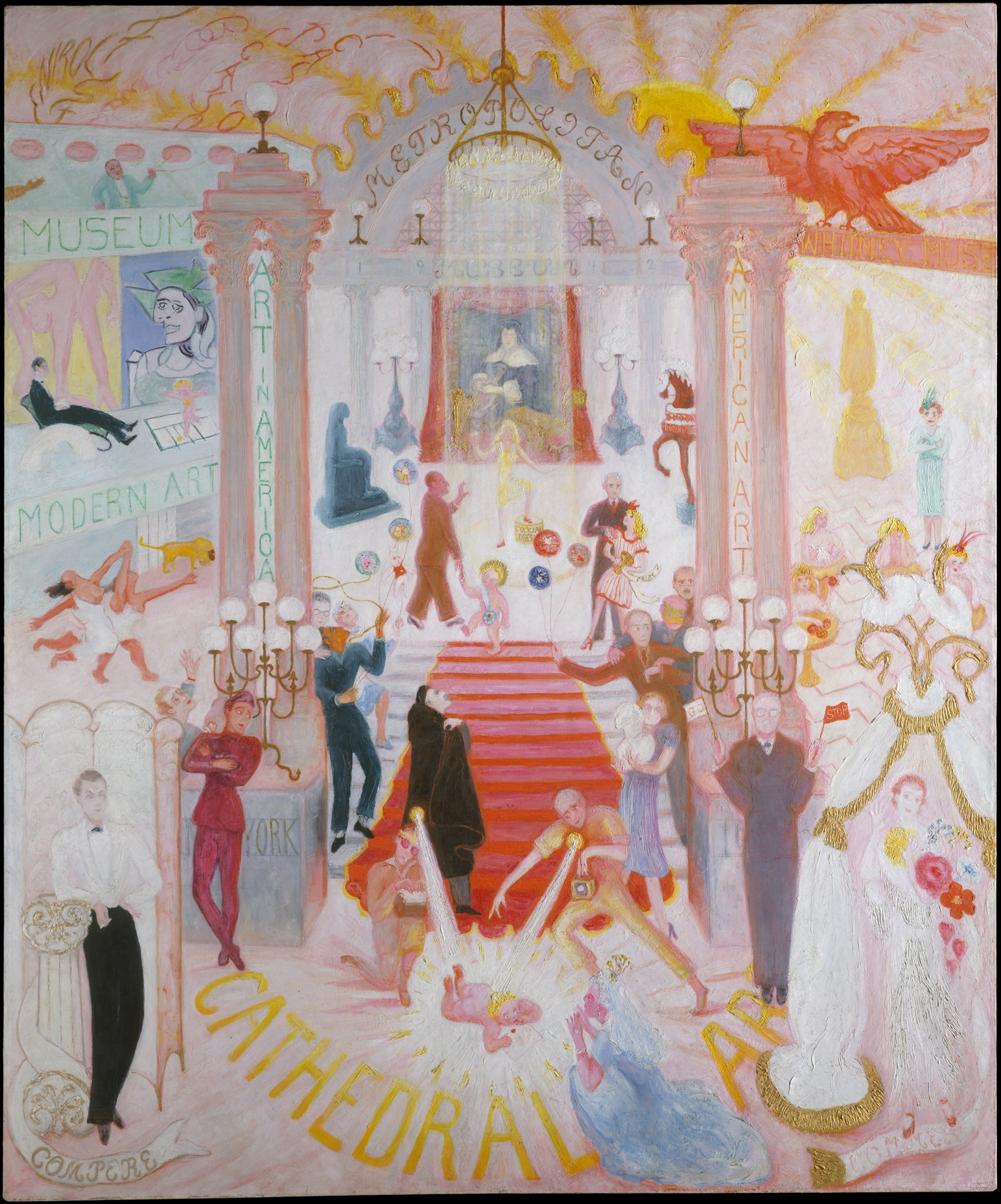
The Cathedrals of Art, 1942, oil on canvas

==== Four Saints in Three Acts ====
In 1934, Four Saints in Three Acts, the first avant-garde opera in America, opened to sold-out audiences in Hartford, Connecticut. The libretto was written by Gertrude Stein and the music by Virgil Thomson. The cast of performers were entirely African Americans, many of whom went on to achieve significant musical careers. Stettheimer designed the stage and the costumes. Thomson invited Stettheimer to design the opera when he saw her paintings in their custom frames, her matching furniture designs, and the studio's cellophane curtains. In preparation for the production, Stettheimer made dolls with fully sewn costumes for each of the characters. She created designs for each scene setting in small shoe boxes. Stettheimer covered the entire back of the opera stage with layers of cellophane, created palm trees with cellophane and feathers, and, for the stage sets, copied her own furniture. The opera received mixed reviews, but Stettheimer's costumes and sets won universal acclaim.

== Feminism ==
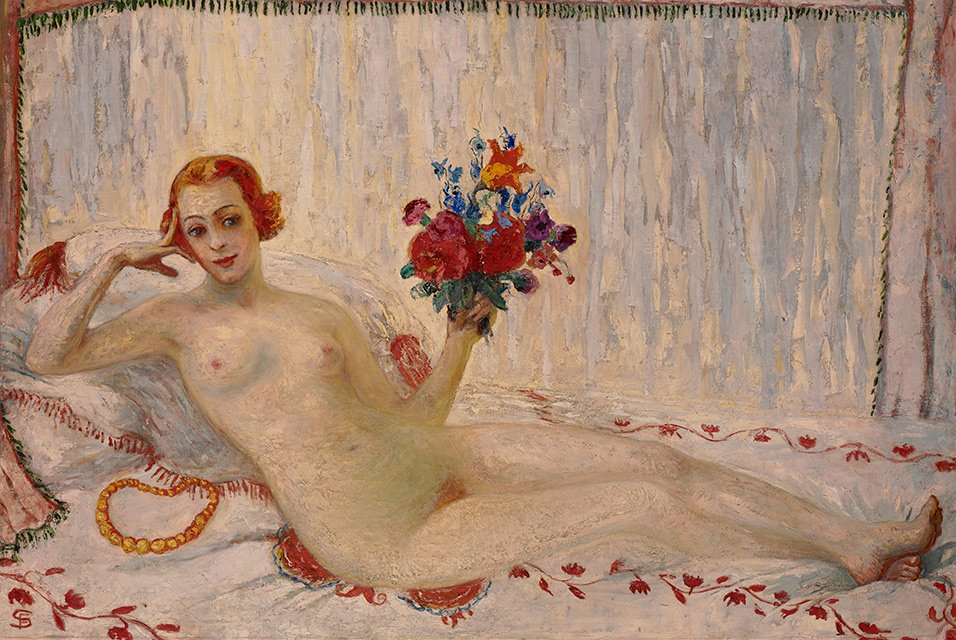
A Model (Nude Self-Portrait), 1915–16, oil on canvas

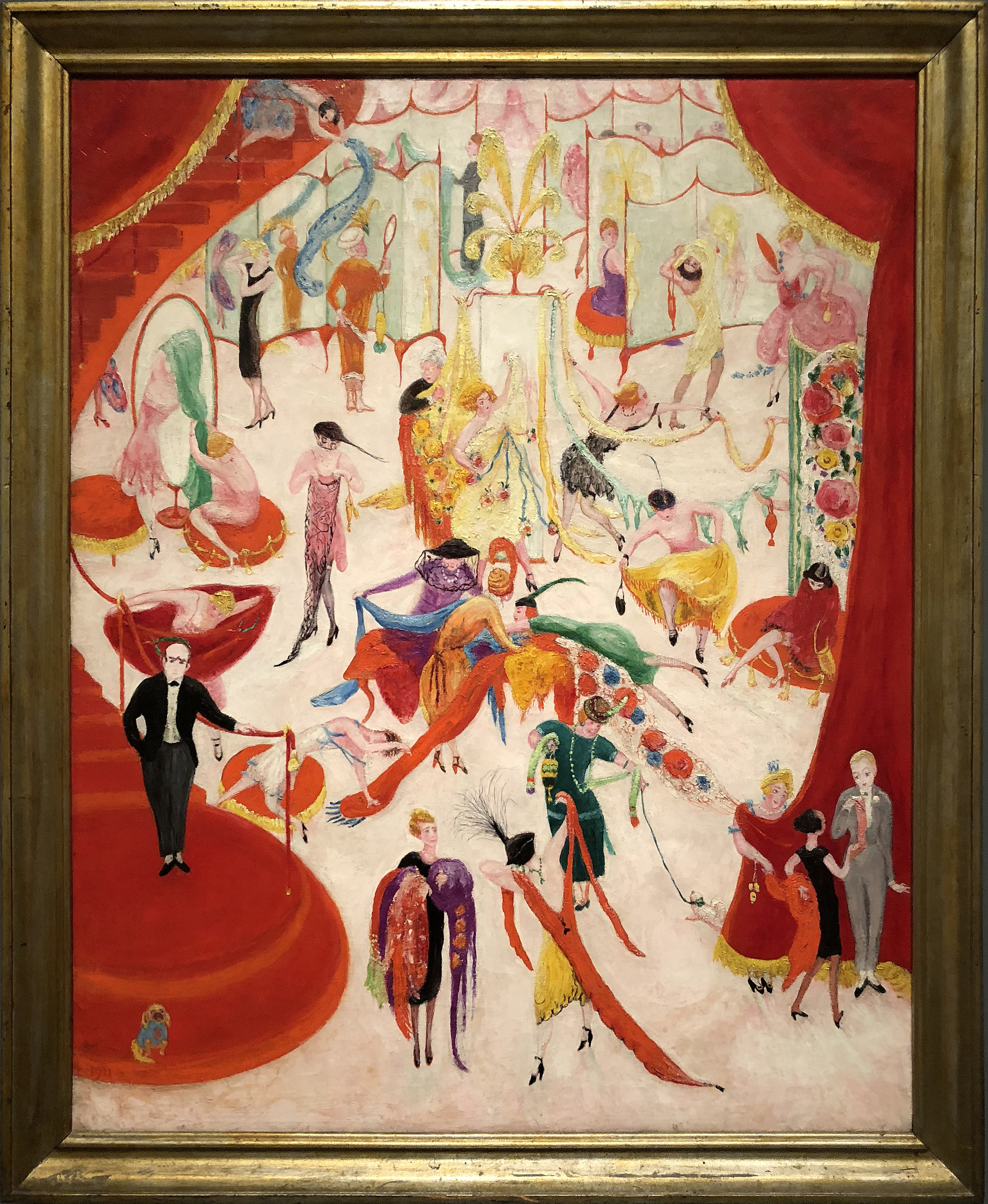
Spring Sale at Bendel's, 1920, oil on canvas

During her twenties and thirties, Stettheimer engaged in flirtations and romantic relationships, and her paintings, diaries, and poems reveal her admiration for the male anatomy. However, they also demonstrate that she adamantly opposed the idea of marriage, believing like many feminists that it constricted women's freedom and interfered with creativity. This idea is readily apparent in her poetry and diary entries.

She wore white pantaloons, which at the time were only worn by feminists and suffragettes and also provided freedom for working on larger canvases. During her years in Europe, Stettheimer and her sisters sought out theatrical productions that featured feminist themes and women performers. Among the flyers in the family scrapbooks is a copy of the proceedings of the First International Feminist Congress held in Paris in 1896.

In 1915, at the age of 45, Stettheimer painted a naked, over life-size self-portrait, A Model (Nude Self-Portrait). Combining elements of past controversial nudes including Manet's painting of the prostitute Olympia and Goya's Nude Maja, Stettheimer's Nude Self-Portrait is one of the earliest nude self-portraits by a woman in Western art history. Holding a flower bouquet above her blatantly painted pubic hair, Stettheimer's humorous, mocking expression in the portrait markedly contrasts with traditional paintings of nudes, making it to date the earliest known overtly feminist nude self-portrait by a woman. She painted several works of unusual, female-oriented contexts such as her monumental 1921 work Spring Sale at Bendel's, in which she humorously captured wealthy women of varying body shapes trying on clothing in an expensive department store; or Natatorium Undine, which portrays nude women riding on floats or swimming on half-oyster shells. On the right, in a sexual reversal from traditional subject matter, a group of women dances around a handsome male exercise instructor whom they admire for his physical appearance.

== Poetry ==
Stettheimer wrote her poems on little scraps of paper. They were gathered and privately published by her sister Ettie. Some of her poems are written in nursery style, some offer witty social critiques, and others present satiric portraits of fellow modernists, such as Gertrude Stein ("Gertie") and Marcel Duchamp ("Duche"). Her poems show an awareness of contemporary consumer culture and offer an acerbic indictment of marriage, as her poem dedicated to Marie Sterner, a New York gallerist who curated her exhibition at Knoedler's, "who intended to be a musician/ but Albert married her." Stettheimer's poems were posthumously assembled in Crystal Flowers, collected and edited by her sister Ettie and privately published in a limited edition in 1949 that Ettie sent to her family and friends.

In 2010 Gammel and Zelazo re-issued Stettheimer's poems and her early ballet libretto, stating that in Stettheimer's "hands and on her tongue, the surface for Stettheimer is depth." They continue, "A close look at the poems reveals equally glittering surfaces and glossy protective veneers" that may be found in the paintings. Gammel and Zelazo see in Stettheimer's work a "grammar of artifice ... designed to cultivate an acute awareness of aesthetic perspective in the reader," as well as "an aesthetics of cellophane," a decidedly modern material she used to decorate her stages and her bedroom, occasionally mixing it with old-fashioned laces.

== Death ==
On May 11, 1944, Stettheimer died of cancer in New York Hospital. She was attended daily by her sisters Ettie and Carrie (the latter died unexpectedly a few weeks later) and her lawyer Joseph Solomon. Unlike the other members of her family who were buried in the family plot, Stettheimer asked to be cremated, and, several years later, her ashes were scattered during a boat trip on the Hudson River by Ettie and Solomon. For many years, Stettheimer had expressed her wishes that all her work be given, as a collection, to a museum. However, realizing that it might prove too difficult to find one museum to take the entire collection, she revised her will, asking that her sisters "follow her wishes" that her works not be sold, but be donated to museums around the country. Ettie left this task to Solomon and Stettheimer's friends, who donated Stettheimer's paintings to most major art museums in the United States, including giving the Cathedral paintings to the Metropolitan Museum of Art.

On hearing of her death, Duchamp wrote Ettie from France and asked if he could organize a retrospective of Stettheimer's paintings. The exhibition, the first full retrospective of a woman artist organized by the Museum of Modern Art, included a catalog essay written by Stettheimer's friend, art critic Henry McBride. Following its run in New York, the Stettheimer retrospective traveled to the San Francisco Legion of Honor Museum and the Arts Club of Chicago.

== Legacy ==
Throughout her life, gallerists in New York, including Julien Levy and Alfred Stieglitz, asked Stettheimer to join their galleries. Although she did exhibit at a number of retail galleries and was often asked to sell her work, she priced each painting at the equivalent of hundreds of thousands of dollars, so no one could afford them. As McBride noted, "She used to smile and say that she liked her pictures herself and preferred to keep them. At the same time, she did lend to public exhibitions." Stettheimer's reluctance to sell her paintings and her decision to price them beyond what the market could bear reflected her desire for artistic independence in a male-dominated art world. Her unique style, combining whimsy and social commentary, has since been recognized as ahead of its time and a precursor to later feminist and queer art movements.

Beginning in 1919, Stettheimer submitted or was invited to exhibit paintings in almost every important exhibition of contemporary art. These included the first Whitney Biennial, several of the earliest group exhibitions and the Museum of Modern Art, the Carnegie International exhibitions, and the Salon d'Automne in Paris. In all, she exhibited in over forty-six exhibitions, and her large, colorful works were usually singled out by art critics for praise. By the 1930s, she was second to Georgia O'Keeffe as the best-known woman artist in New York. In a Harper's Bazaar article after her death, the writer Carl Van Vechten stated that Stettheimer "was both the historian and the critic of her period and she goes a long way toward telling us how some of New York lived in those strange years after the First World War, telling us in brilliant colors and assured designs, telling us in painting that has few rivals in her day or ours."

Following her death in the late 1940s, when Stettheimer's works were donated to art museums, the taste in art had moved to abstract expressionism, and her paintings were frequently not displayed. In addition, because her paintings were not sold at art galleries or at auction, they received no publicity and so her name and work were not as well known. Author Parker Tyler's biography, Florine Stettheimer: A Life in Art, was released in 1963. In the 1970s Stettheimer's work was revived by feminist art historians including, most prominently, Linda Nochlin. Stettheimer went through another revival in 1995 with a retrospective exhibition of her work at the Whitney Museum of American Art and the publication of another biography, Barbara Bloemink's The Life and Art of Florine Stettheimer.

Beginning in 2015 with the first retrospective of Stettheimer's work in Europe at the Lenbachhaus in Munich, Stettheimer's work has been included in numerous exhibitions in the United States, and her significance as an early feminist artist and her widespread influence on contemporary artists is more fully recognized. Andrew Russeth, the executive editor of ARTnews, stated that Stettheimer's paintings "elegantly make the case that she is one of the greatest artists of the 20th century and could serve as a useful model for those of the 21st."

== Critical reception ==
During her lifetime, Stettheimer's work was specifically mentioned and cited favorably by critics reviewing the many exhibitions in which it was shown, as well as by the writer/photographer Carl Van Vechten and the painter Marsden Hartley. Van Vechten, contrasting her work to that of Charles Demuth, wrote that Stettheimer's work possessed a very modern quality: "At the risk of being misunderstood, I must call this quality jazz." Hartley praised her "delicate satire and iridescent wit." In their essay, "Wrapped in Cellophane: Florine Stettheimer's Visual Poetics," Irene Gammel and Suzanne Zelazo review the various positions voiced by scholars and biographers regarding Stettheimer's unique modernist sensibility, whose whimsy seems very different from mainstream modernists. They write:

Unapologetically domestic and über-feminine, Stettheimer's work has been variously described as 'faux naïf', reveling in simplified shapes and Fauve-like colors (Tatham); as 'rococo subversive', embracing a camp sensibility (Nochlin); and as 'temporal modernism' influenced by Bergsonian concepts of time as heterogeneous durée, aligning Stettheimer with Marcel Proust and other literary modernists (Bloemink).

Representing an international style of modernism that integrates various art forms, Stettheimer's paintings, like her poems, are sensorily as well as sensually charged. Because she refused to affiliate herself with a single, well-known art gallery, such as the Stieglitz "Group", or with a specific style such as Dada or abstraction, Stettheimer's work was always received and reviewed as uniquely her own. Her unique, feminine style and consciously female gaze set her work directly against the critical tastes of the male-dominated Abstract Expressionism and Minimalism of the 1960s and 1970s.

== Collections ==
- Asbury Park South - halley k harrisburg and Michael Rosenfeld, New York
- La Fete A Duchamp - private collection
- West Point - This painting was given by Ettie to the West Point Military Academy after Stettheimer's death. It is missing since the 1950s.
- The largest collection, with 65 of Stettheimer's works (mostly her early student works, but also Portrait of Myself and her portraits of her two sisters), is at the Avery Architectural and Fine Arts Library at Columbia University. Columbia also has the dolls and maquettes for Four Saints in Three Acts and Pocahontas, and the Stettheimer sisters' scrapbooks of theater programs.
- The second-largest collection, with 56 works, is at the Museum of Modern Art. Along with Family Portrait #2 and Portrait of My Mother, these include all of her drawings and maquettes for her Orpheus ballet and her two extant three-dimensional screens.
- Metropolitan Museum of Art - the Cathedral series: Cathedrals of Broadway (1929), Cathedrals of Fifth Avenue (1931), Cathedrals of Wall Street (1939), Cathedrals of Art (1942–)
- Whitney Museum of American Art - New York/Liberty (1918–19), Sun (1931)

Most art museums in large cities across the United States that were established prior to 1950 have a single painting by Stettheimer in their collections, as do a few university art museums, including the University of California at Berkeley and the Stanford University Museum of Art, as these works were distributed after the artist's death according to her wishes by her lawyer Joseph Solomon and her friends Carl Van Vechten and Kirk Askew.

== Exhibitions ==
=== Solo exhibitions ===
- Exhibition of Paintings by Miss Florine Stettheimer, Knoedler & Co. Gallery, New York, October 16–28, 1916

=== Selected group exhibitions ===
The following are a selection of group exhibitions to which Stettheimer lent work during her lifetime. Posthumous group exhibitions are not listed.

- 25th Anniversary Exhibition of the Arts Students League of New York, American Fine Arts Society Building, New York, 1900 (listed as a non-resident member)
- First Annual Exhibition of Society of Independent Artists, Grand Central Palace, April 10–May 6, 1916 (her friend Marcel Duchamp's infamous Fountain urinal was also exhibited)
- American Paintings and Sculpture Pertaining to the War, Knoedler & Co Gallery, New York, curated by Marie Sterner, 1918
- Salon d'Automne, 15eme Exposition, Galerie Nationale du Jeu de Paume, Paris, November 1–December 20, 1922
- Seventh Annual Exhibition of the Society of Independent Artists, February 24–March 18, 1923 (Stettheimer exhibition annually at the Society through the 1920s)
- Twenty-Second Annual International Exhibition of Paintings, Carnegie Institute, Pittsburgh, Pennsylvania, 1924
- Twenty-Third Annual Exhibition of Modern Decorative Art, Art Institute of Chicago, December 23, 1924 – January 25, 1925
- Chicago Women's World's Fair, April 1925
- 100 Important Paintings by Living American Artists, Arts Council of the City of New York, Architecture and Allied Arts Exposition, 1929
- First Biennial Exhibition of Contemporary American Painters, The Whitney Museum of American Art, 1932
- Modern Works of Art: 5th Anniversary Exhibition, The Museum of Modern Art, November 19, 1934 – January 20, 1935
- Twenty-Third Annual International Exhibition of Paintings, Carnegie Institute, Pittsburgh, Pennsylvania, 1934
- Three Centuries of American Art, 1609-1938, Galerie nationale du Jeu de Paume, May 24–July 17, 1938
- Art in Our Time: 10th Anniversary Exhibition: Painting, Sculpture, Prints, The Museum of Modern Art, May 10–September 30, 1939
- Twentieth Century Portraits, The Museum of Modern Art, January 9, 1942 – February 24, 1943
- Painting, Sculpture, Prints, The Museum of Modern Art, May 24–October 15, 1944

=== Posthumous exhibitions ===
- Florine Stettheimer, Wadsworth Athenaeum, Hartford, Connecticut, 1945
- Florine Stettheimer, The Museum of Modern Art, October 1–November 17, 1946
- Exhibition of Paintings by Florine Stettheimer, The Arts Club of Chicago, 1947
- The Flowers of Florine Stettheimer, Durlacher Brothers Gallery, New York, 1948
- Florine Stettheimer Exhibition, Vassar College Art Gallery, Poughkeepsie, New York, 1949
- Florine Stettheimer Exhibition, Wellesley College Museum, Wellesley, Massachusetts, organized by Durlacher Brothers with Ettie Stettheimer, 1950
- Twelve Paintings by Florine Stettheimer, The Detroit Institute of Arts, 1951
- Exhibition of Paintings of Florine Stettheimer, Smith College Museum of Art, Northampton, Massachusetts, 1952
- Florine Stettheimer: Her Family, Her Friends, Durlacher Brothers Gallery, New York, 1965
- Florine Stettheimer, An Exhibition of Paintings, Watercolors, Drawings, Columbia University, New York, February 8–March 8, 1973
- Florine Stettheimer : still lifes, portraits and pageants, 1910 to 1942, Institute of Contemporary Art, 1980
- Friends and Family: Portraiture in the World of Florine Stettheimer, Katonah Museum of Art, ??–Nov. 28, 1993
- Florine Stettheimer: Manhattan Fantastica, Whitney Museum of American Art, New York, July–November 15, 1995 catalogue distributed by Harry N. Abrams, Inc., New York
- Florine Stettheimer, Lenbachhaus, Munich, September 27, 2014 – January 4, 2015
- Florine Stettheimer: Painting Poetry, May 5 – September 24, 2017, The Jewish Museum and October 21, 2017 – January 28, 2018, Art Gallery of Ontario

== See also ==
- Stettheimer Dollhouse

== Sources ==
=== Books ===
- Baldoni, Ann Marie (2000). Sophisticated Play: The World According to Florine Stettheimer. University of California, Davis. p. 20.
- Bloemink, Barbara J (2022). Florine Stettheimer: A Biography Munich, Germany: HIRMER. ISBN 978-3-7774-3834-4
- Bloemink, Barbara J (1995). The life and art of Florine Stettheimer. New Haven [Conn.]; London: Yale University Press. ISBN 9780300063400. OCLC 468522169.
- Birmingham, Stephen (2015). "Our crowd": the great Jewish families of New York. New York: Open Road Integrated Media. ISBN 9781504026284.
- Brickner, Isaac M; Wile, Isaac Abram (1912). The Jews of Rochester: an historical summary of their progress and status as citizens of Rochester from early days to the year nineteen hundred and twelve. Rochester, N.Y.: Historical Review Society. p. 107. OCLC 7077267.
- Elliott, Bridget; Helland, Janice (2003). Women artists and the decorative arts, 1880-1935: the gender of ornament. Burlington, VT: Ashgate. p. 207. ISBN 978-0754605966.
- Frederickson, Kristen; Webb, Sarah E. (2003). Singular Women, Writing the Artist. University of California Press. ISBN 978-0-520-23164-1.
- Kramer, Hilton (2013-12-09). The Triumph of Modernism: The Art World, 1987–2005. Rowman & Littlefield. ISBN 9781442223226.
- McBride, Henry (1930). "Florine Stettheimer". In Barr, Alfred H. (ed.). Three American Romantic Painters. New York: The Museum of Modern Art.
- Sawelson-Gorse, Naomi (2001). Women in Dada: essays on sex, gender, and identity. Cambridge, Mass.; London: MIT. ISBN 9780262692601. OCLC 1059566972.
- Singer, Sandra L. (2003). Adventures Abroad: North American Women at German-speaking Universities, 1868-1915. Greenwood Publishing Group. ISBN 9780313323713.
- Stettheimer, Florine; Gammel, Irene; Zelazo, Suzanne (2015). Crystal flowers: poems and a libretto. ISBN 9781897388723. OCLC 1030570200.
- Stettheimer, Florine; Sussman, Elisabeth (1980). Florine Stettheimer: still lifes, portraits and pageants, 1910 to 1942. Boston, Mass.: Institute of Contemporary Art. OCLC 404257174.
- Tessler, Nira (2015). Flowers and Towers: Politics of Identity in the Art of the American "New Woman". Cambridge Scholars Publishing. p. 115. ISBN 9781443886239.
- Tyler, Parker (1963). Florine Stettheimer: a life in art. New York: Farrar, Straus. OCLC 718407574.
- Watson, Steven (1991). Strange bedfellows: the first American avant-garde. New York: Abbeville Press. ISBN 9780896599345. OCLC 1077797040.
- Watson, Steven (2000). Prepare for saints: gertrude stein, virgil thomson, and the mainstreaming of american modernism. New York: University of California Press. ISBN 9780520223530.

=== Articles ===
- Bloemink, Barbara (July 6, 2017). "Imagine the Fun Florine Stettheimer Would Have with Donald Trump: The Artist as Feminist, Democrat, and Chronicler of Her Time". ARTnews.
- Bloemink, Barbara (October 15, 2016). "Florine Stettheimer: Feminist Provocateur". Hyperallergic.
- Cascone, Sarah (2017-05-26). "How Florine Stettheimer Sabotaged Her Own Market". Artnet.
- Gammel, Irene; Zelazo, Suzanne (Fall 2011). "Wrapped in Cellophane: Florine Stettheimer's Visual Poetics". Woman's Art Journal. 32 (2). Old City Publishing, Inc.: 14–21. JSTOR 41331120.
- Hartley, Marsden (July 1931). "The Paintings of Florine Stettheimer". Creative Art. IX (1): 19–23.
- Lorden, Matthew (March 20, 1921). "Review of the Society of Independent Artists". The World Magazine.
- Mulcahy, Susan (2016-07-26). "A Prized Stettheimer Painting, Sold Under the Radar by a University". The New York Times. ISSN 0362-4331.
- Nochlin, Linda (September 1980). "Florine Stettheimer—Rococo Subversive". Art in America. 68: 64–83.
- Russeth, Andrew (21 October 2014). "'Forcing Me in Joy to Paint Them': In Munich, a Rare Look at Florine Stettheimer". Artnews. Penske Media Corporation. Archived from the original on 30 September 2024.
- Tatham, David (2000). "Florine Stettheimer at Lake Placid, 1919: Modernism in the Adirondacks". The American Art Journal. 31 (1/2): 4–31. doi:10.2307/1594624. JSTOR 1594624.
- Smith, Roberta (October 10, 1993). "ART VIEW; The Very Rich Hours Of Florine Stettheimer". The New York Times. ISSN 0362-4331.
- Smith, Roberta (July 21, 1995). "ART REVIEW; Extreme Artifice Directly From Life (in New York Between the Wars)". The New York Times. ISSN 0362-4331.
- Smith, Roberta (2017-05-18). "A Case for the Greatness of Florine Stettheimer". The New York Times. ISSN 0362-4331.
- Van Vechten, Carl (February 1922). "Pastiches et Pistaches". The Reviewer. 4 (2). Whittet & Shepperson: 268–270.
- Van Vechten, Carl (October 1947). "The World of Florine Stettheimer". Harper's Bazaar. Vol. 79. p. 75.
- Mathews, Nancy Mowll (1999). "Review of The Life and Art of Florine Stettheimer; Florine Stettheimer: Manhattan Fantastica, Barbara J. Bloemink". Woman's Art Journal. 20 (1): 54–57. doi:10.2307/1358849. ISSN 0270-7993. JSTOR 1358849.

=== Websites ===
- "Florine Stettheimer at Columbia". Columbia University Libraries.
- "Extravagant Crowd | Stettheimer Sisters". brbl-archive.library.yale.edu.
- Cleveland Museum of Art (October 30, 2018). "Sunday Afternoon in the Country". Cleveland Museum of Art.
- "Maquettes made for costumes and scenery for Gertrude Stein and Virgil Thompson's Four Saints in Three Acts". Columbia Digital Library Collections. 1934.
- "The Cathedrals of Broadway". www.metmuseum.org.
- "The Cathedrals of Fifth Avenue". www.metmuseum.org.
- "The Cathedrals of Wall Street". www.metmuseum.org.
- "Florine Stettheimer | The Cathedrals of Art | The Met". www.metmuseum.org.
- "Lake Placid". Museum of Fine Arts, Boston. October 7, 2018.
- "Designs for artist's ballet Orphée of the Quat-z-arts | MoMA". The Museum of Modern Art.
- "Florine Stettheimer | MoMA". The Museum of Modern Art.
- "Modern Works of Art: 5th Anniversary Exhibition". The Museum of Modern Art.
- "Art in Our Time: 10th Anniversary Exhibition: Painting, Sculpture, Prints". The Museum of Modern Art.
- "Twentieth Century Portraits". The Museum of Modern Art.
- "Painting, Sculpture, Prints". The Museum of Modern Art.
- "Birthday Bouquet". art.nelson-atkins.org.
- Danforth, Ellen Zak (September 1987). "Collection: Florine and Ettie Stettheimer papers | Archives at Yale". archives.yale.edu.
- "Record La Fete a Duchamp, (painting) | Collections Search Center, Smithsonian Institution". collections.si.edu.
- "New York/Liberty". whitney.org.
- "Sun". whitney.org.
- "Florine Stettheimer". The Museum of Modern Art.
- "Lenbachhaus - Florine Stettheimer". www.lenbachhaus.de. Archived from the original on 2019-02-07.
- "Florine Stettheimer: Painting Poetry". The Jewish Museum.
- "Florine Stettheimer: Painting Poetry". Art Gallery of Ontario.
- Reis, Victoria (2 August 2017). "The Stetties: Florine Stettheimer and Her Sisters". Medium. Jewish Museum (Manhattan).

=== Solo exhibition catalogs ===
- McBride, Henry (1946). "Florine Stettheimer" (PDF). The Museum of Modern Art.
- Columbia University in the City of New York. Florine Stettheimer: An Exhibition of Paintings, Watercolors, Drawings. New York: Columbia University, 1973
- Bloemink, Barbara J (1993). Friends and family: portraiture in the world of Florine Stettheimer. Katonah, N.Y.: Katonah Museum of Art. ISBN 9780915171309. OCLC 29889522.
- Sussman, Elisabeth; Bloemink, Barbara J; Nochlin, Linda (1995). Florine Stettheimer: Manhattan fantastica. New York: Whitney Museum of American Art: Distributed by H.N. Abrams. ISBN 9780874270952. OCLC 318866840.
- Mühling, Matthias; Althaus, Karin; Böller, Susanne; Kellner, Karin; Ott, Bernadette; Stettheimer, Florine; Städtische Galerie im Lenbachhaus München (2014). Florine Stettheimer (in German). Lenbachhaus. ISBN 9783886451821. OCLC 903585597.
- Stettheimer, Florine; Brown, Stephen; Uhlyarik, Georgiana; Brown, Cecily; Hoffmann, Jens (2017). Florine Stettheimer: painting poetry. Art Gallery of Ontario, Jewish Museum (New York, N.Y.). ISBN 9780300221985. OCLC 980937038.
