= The Autobiography and Sex Life of Andy Warhol =

1971 book by John Wilcock

- Author: John Wilcock
- Publication date: 1971
- ISBN: 978-0-9706126-1-8

The Autobiography and Sex Life of Andy Warhol (ISBN 978-0-9706126-1-8) is a 1971 book by the British journalist John Wilcock. It was republished in June 2010 by Trela Media.

The book is a collection of oral interviews with some of Warhol's closest associates and superstars, including Leo Castelli, Charles Henri Ford, Henry Geldzahler, Gerard Malanga, Nico, Ultra Violet, Viva, Lou Reed, and Mario Amaya.

== History ==
John Wilcock was introduced to Andy Warhol through filmmaker Jonas Mekas, assisting on some of Warhol's early films, hanging out at his parties and quickly becoming a regular at The Factory. “About six months after I started hanging out at the old, silvery Factory on West 47th Street,” Wilcock later reflected, “[Gerard] Malanga came up to me and asked, ‘When are you going to write something about us?'” The book's title, originally suggested to Wilcock by Paul Morrissey, is misleading; the book is neither an autobiography nor a sexual exposé. Despite its small initial printing, the book was sold for upwards of $75 at some of the world's top art museums.

A review by Branden W. Joseph of Harvard University credited the “virtually self-published” volume as a trendsetter in Warhol studies, praising the “unassuming, slightly irreverent” tribute for the way it “cleverly engaged with Warhol’s self-fashioned image, reinforcing the impression that Warhol had nothing to say on his own behalf.”
