= Charles Henri Ford =

American poet (1908–2002)

- Born: February 10, 1908 (Note: "Mr. Ford's preferred birth dates varied between 1909 and 1913. In fact, he was born Charles Henry Ford in 1908...."); Brookhaven, Mississippi, U.S.
- Died: September 27, 2002 (aged 94); New York City, U.S.
- Resting place: Rose Hill Cemetery, Brookhaven, Mississippi, U.S.
- Partner: Pavel Tchelitchew (1934–1957)
- Relatives: Ruth Ford (sister)

Charles Henri Ford (February 10, 1908 – September 27, 2002) was an American poet, novelist, diarist, filmmaker, photographer, and collage artist. He published more than a dozen collections of poetry, exhibited his artwork in Europe and the United States, edited the Surrealist magazine View (1940–1947) in New York City, and directed an experimental film. He was the partner of the artist Pavel Tchelitchew.

== Early years ==
Charles Henry Ford was born in Brookhaven, Mississippi, on February 10, 1908. His family owned hotels in the Southern United States. Although the family was Baptist, he was sent to Catholic boarding schools. Actress Ruth Ford (1911–2009) was his sister and only known sibling. The New Yorker published one of his poems in 1927, before he turned 20, under the name Charles Henri Ford, which he had adopted to counter the assumption that he was related to the business magnate Henry Ford. He dropped out of high school and published several issues of a monthly magazine, Blues: A Magazine of New Rhythms, in 1929 and 1930. The magazine's other editors were Parker Tyler and Kathleen Tankersley Young.

Not long after, he became part of Gertrude Stein's salon in Paris, where he met Natalie Barney, Man Ray, Kay Boyle, Janet Flanner, Peggy Guggenheim, Djuna Barnes, and others of the American expatriate community in Montparnasse and Saint-Germain-des-Près. He had an affair with Barnes and they visited Tangiers together. He went to Morocco in 1932 at the suggestion of Paul Bowles, and there he typed Barnes's just-completed novel, Nightwood (1936), for her.

== Creative career ==
With Parker Tyler, who later became a highly respected film critic, he co-authored The Young and Evil, sometimes called The Young and the Evil, (1933), an experimental novel with debts to the prose of Barnes and Stein. Stein wrote a blurb for the novel that said "The Young and Evil creates this generation as This Side of Paradise by Fitzgerald created his generation." Tyler later described it as "the novel that beat the beat generation by a generation". (Note: The statement is often mis-attributed to Gertrude Stein although she died in 1946 and the term Beat Generation was not introduced until 1948.) Louis Kronenberger, in the novel's only U.S. review, described it as "the first candid, gloves-off account of more or less professional young homosexuals". Edith Sitwell burned her copy and described it as "entirely without soul, like a dead fish stinking in hell".

The Young and Evil is notable for being one of the first openly gay American novels. The novel portrays a collection of young artists as they write poems, have sex, move in and out of cheap rented rooms, and explore the many speakeasies in their Greenwich Village neighborhood. The characters' gender and sexual identities are presented candidly. It was rejected by several American and British publishers before Obelisk Press in Paris agreed to publish it. Officials in the U.K. and U.S. prevented shipments of the novel from reaching bookstores. In fact,The Young and Evil was banned for over 30 years in the U.S.

Ford returned to New York City in 1934 and brought Pavel Tchelitchew, his partner, with him. Ford's circle at the time included Carl Van Vechten, Glenway Wescott, George Platt Lynes, Lincoln Kirstein, Orson Welles, George Balanchine, and E. E. Cummings. Visiting friends from abroad included Cecil Beaton, Leonor Fini, George Hoyningen-Huene, and Salvador Dalí. Beaton's photographs of Ford represented a departure from his fine art portraits of royalty and celebrities. In one Ford posed "on a bed of tabloid newspapers", symbols of the violence and excess of American culture, in an exploration of low culture with homoerotic undertones that drew on Ford's "sexually transgressive image".

He published his first full-length book of poems, The Garden of Disorder in 1938. William Carlos Williams wrote the introduction. When Ford discussed the concept of poetry, he highlighted its relationship with other forms of art. Ford said, "Everything is related to the concept of poetry. As you know, Jean Cocteau used to talk about the poetry of the novel, the poetry of the essay, the poetry of the theater—everything he did, he said, was poetry. Well, he was one of my gurus." While some of his poetry is easily recognizable as surrealist–"the pink bee storing in your brain's/veins a gee-gaw honey for the golden skillet"–he also adapted his style to political poetry. He published in New Masses and gave voice to a black man confronting a lynch mob: "Now I climb death's tree./The pruning hooks of many mouths/cut the black-leaved boughs./The robins of my eyes hover where/sixteen leaves fall that were a prayer."

In 1940, Ford and Tyler collaborated again on the magazine View devoted to avant-garde and surrealist art. It "took full advantage of the European Surrealists roosting in New York during the war" to establish New York as a center of surrealism. The magazine was published quarterly, as finances permitted, until 1947. It attracted contributions from artists such as Tchelitchew, Yves Tanguy, Max Ernst, André Masson, Pablo Picasso, Henry Miller, Paul Klee, Albert Camus, Lawrence Durrell, Georgia O'Keeffe, Man Ray, Jorge Luis Borges, Joan Miró, Alexander Calder, Marc Chagall, Jean Genet, René Magritte, Jean Dubuffet, and Edouard Roditi. It printed the work of Ernst, Ray and Isamu Noguchi as its cover art.

In the 1940s, View Editions, the publishing arm of the quarterly, published the first monograph on Marcel Duchamp and a collection of André Breton's poems in a bi-lingual edition, Young Cherry Trees Secured Against Hares (1946). Ford's book of poems Sleep in a Nest of Flames (1959) contained a preface by Dame Edith Sitwell. Ford and Tchelitchew moved to Europe in 1952, and in 1955 Ford had a photo exhibition, Thirty Images from Italy, at London's Institute of Contemporary Arts. In Paris the next year he had his first one-man show of paintings and drawings. Jean Cocteau wrote the foreword to the catalog. In 1957, Tchelitchew died in Rome.

In 1962 Ford returned to the United States and began associating with Pop artists and underground filmmakers. He met Andy Warhol in 1962 at a party at his sister's and an interview recounting his association with Warhol is featured in the book The Autobiography and Sex Life of Andy Warhol. In 1965, Cordier & Ekstrom Gallery in New York hosted an exhibition of his work called "Poem Posters", lithographs with "acid colors, spliced-together typefaces and pop culture images" he had made on an offset lithographic press in Athens in 1964–65. They were "a particularly visual and outrageous form of concrete poetry" in which Ford exploited all he had learned of publishing, graphic design, and printing.

In the late 1960s, he began directing his own films. The first was Poem Posters (1967), a 20-minute documentary about the installation, opening, and breakdown of the exhibition of his surrealist collages. It was chosen for the Fourth International Avant-Garde Festival in Belgium. His second film was Johnny Minotaur, which premiered in 1971. Its nominal subject was the Greek myth of Theseus, Ariadne, and the Minotaur's labyrinth. It was an exercise in surrealist juxtaposition of styles, including cinema vérité and "erotic kitsch". Shot in Crete and employing the structure of a film-within-a-film, it pretended to document the experiences of a film producer as he worked on a contemporary film about a classical myth, but Ford's work moved freely between the documentary subject and the supposed film in production with little respect for any distinction between the two. A reviewer in The New York Times said of the film, "The order of the day is male anatomy and male sexuality." The film played for a time at New York's Bleecker Street Cinema and been rarely screened since then. The Film-Makers' Cooperative has screened what it describes as the only surviving print of the film in festival settings, though some venues have refused to show it because of its explicit sexual content given the youthful appearance of some of the actors.

He published selections from his diaries as Water from a Bucket in 2001

In the 1970s Ford moved to Nepal and bought a house in Kathmandu. In 1973 he hired a local teenager, Indra Tamang, to run errands and cook, then taught him photography and made him his assistant. Tamang remained at his side for the rest of Ford's life, "a sort of surrogate son", artistic collaborator, and personal caretaker. Together they toured from Turkey to India, relocated to Paris and Crete, and then to New York City. (Note: Tamang was born about 1953. He left a wife and two daughters in Nepal. He was widowed in 1986, remarried in the 1990s, had another daughter, and brought his two elder daughters to the U.S. Ford and later his sister Ruth Ford paid Tamang so little his wife needed to work to support the family.) Ford compiled a number of art projects using his collage materials and Tamang's photography. Their three decades together are chronicled in Tamang's book My Curious Years with Charles Henri Ford: The Autobiography of Indra B. Tamang (2024).

In 1992, he edited an anthology of articles that had appeared in View. Titled View: Parade of the Avant Garde, 1940-1947, it carried an introduction by Paul Bowles.

In 2001, he published a selection from his diaries as Water from a Bucket: A Diary 1948-1957. Covering the years from his father's final illness to the death of Tchelitchew, it provided, according to Publishers Weekly, "richly observed details, both quotidian and unusual, constituting a delightful, moving, poetic portrait of a man and a subculture".

Also in 2001, he was the subject of a two-hour documentary film, Sleep in a Nest of Flames, directed by James Dowell and John Kolomvakis.

== Personal life ==
When Tchelitchew died in Rome in 1957, The New York Times described Ford as his "life-long companion and secretary."

Ford and his sister had separate apartments at The Dakota apartment building in their final years, where Tamang served as their caretaker.

Charles Henri Ford died, aged 94, on September 27, 2002, in New York City. He was survived by his younger sister, actress Ruth Ford, who died in 2009, aged 98.

Ford left some paintings and the rights to his co-authored novel The Young and Evil to Tamang, who took the ashes of both Fords to Mississippi for burial in 2011. They are buried in Rose Hill Cemetery, Brookhaven, Mississippi. The inscription on the gravestone of Charles Henri Ford reads "Sleeping Through His Reward". (Note: While serving the Fords, Tamang lived with his wife and three daughters in a small house in Queens. Ruth Ford willed him two apartments in the Dakota and a collection of Russian surrealist art while disinheriting her own daughter and two grandchildren.)

== Works ==
Nonfiction

- Water from a Bucket: A Diary 1948-1957 (Turtle Point Press, 2001)

Fiction

- The Young and Evil, with Parker Tyler (Paris: Obelisk Press, 1933)

Poetry

- A Pamphlet of Sonnets (1936)
- The Garden of Disorder (1938)
- ABC's (1940)
- The Overturned Lake (1941)
- Poems for Painters (1945)
- The Half-Thoughts, The Distances of Pain (1947)
- Sleep in a Nest of Flames (1949)
- Spare Parts (1966)
- Silver Flower Coo (1968)
- Flag of Ecstasy: Selected Poems (1972)
- 7 poems (1974)
- Om Krishna I: Special Effects (1972)
- Om Krishna II: from the Sickroom of the Walking Eagles (1981)
- Om Krishna III (1982)
- Emblems of Arachne (1986)
- Out of the Labyrinth: Selected Poems (2001)

Editor

- The Mirror of Baudelaire (New Directions, 1942) (Note: Poems in French and English by Baudelaire and others.)
- A Night with Jupiter and Other Fantastic Stories (New York: View Editions, Vanguard Press, 1945) (Note: Illustrations by Calder, Tchelitchew, Tanguy, et al. With contributions by Paul Bowles, Henry Miller, Giorgio di Chirico, Miguel Asturias, Sender, Leonora Carrington, Raymond Roussel, et al.)
- View: Parade of the Avant-Garde, 1940–1947 (Thunder's Mouth Press, 1992; Basic Books, 1993)

== See also ==
- List of gay novels prior to the Stonewall riots
