= John Wilcock =

British journalist

- Born: 4 August 1927; Sheffield, England
- Died: 13 September 2018 (aged 91); Ojai, California, U.S.
- Occupation: Journalist
- Notable credit(s): Village Voice; East Village Other; Underground Press Syndicate; Interview
- Spouse: Amber La Mann (m. 1967; div. 1972)

John Wilcock (4 August 1927 – 13 September 2018) was a British journalist known for his work in the underground press, as well as his travel guide books.

As the first news editor of the New York Village Voice, Wilcock shook up traditional publishing in the USA. His influence extended to several continents, including Australia and the United Kingdom, where—in his mild-mannered way—he pushed the boundaries of image and speech. An unsung hero of the sixties, Wilcock also served three years as a travel editor at The New York Times.

== Biography ==
=== Early career ===
Wilcock began working for newspapers in his home country — the Daily Mail and the Daily Mirror — as well as magazines in Toronto, Ontario, Canada.

=== Underground press ===
After co-founding the Village Voice in 1955, his Voice weekly column lasted from 1955 to 1965, when he left to edit New York's first underground paper, the East Village Other.

While at the Village Voice, he founded The Traveler’s Directory, a hospitality exchange service for offering free homestays. The Traveler’s Directory was published from 1960 to 1984, under various editors.

While coordinating the 200 papers of the Underground Press Syndicate, established in 1966, he guest-edited "underground" papers in London, Los Angeles, and Tokyo; returning to New York to publish his own underground tabloid, Other Scenes.

=== Guide books ===
In 1960 Wilcock wrote the first of several travel books for Arthur Frommer, Mexico On $5 a Day, following up with guides to California, Greece, Japan, and India. During this period he co-edited (with Elizabeth Pepper) The Witches Almanac. Three more books resulted from their collaboration: Magical & Mystical Sites (Europe); an Occult Guide to South America, and A Guide to Occult Britain. At the invitation of the Venezuelan government he researched and wrote Traveling in Venezuela in 1979 and, in the 1980s and 1990s wrote/edited 25 books for Insight Guides.

=== Andy Warhol ===
After being introduced to Andy Warhol in the mid-1960s, Wilcok began a five-year association with the enigmatic artist. He assisted on some of Warhol's early films, hanging out at his parties and quickly becoming a regular at The Factory. "About six months after I started hanging out at the old, silvery Factory on West 47th Street," Wilcock later reflected, "[Gerard] Malanga came up to me and asked, ‘When are you going to write something about us?'” Wilcock interviewed Warhol's closest associates, asking them to "explain" him, publishing the results in 1971 as The Autobiography and Sex Life of Andy Warhol.

Despite its small initial printing, the $5 book later became sold for upwards of $75 at some of the world's top art museums. A revised edition of the book was released in 2010.

Wilcock and Warhol co-founded Interview magazine in 1969.

=== Later life ===
Relocating to Ojai, California, in 2001, Wilcock began publishing an international monthly magazine, the Ojai Orange, free to his friends in a dozen countries, along with his weekly column and his weekly public-access television travel show.

== Personal life and death ==
Wilcock married Amber (Ellen) La Mann (also known as Amber Nomi Lamann) in Tokyo, Japan, in December of 1967. They divorced in 1972.

Wilcock died in Ojai, California, on 13 September 2018 after multiple strokes, at the age of 91.
