= Elizabeth Pepper =

Elizabeth Pepper Dacosta
- Born: November 7, 1923; Providence, Rhode Island USA
- Died: July 14, 2005 (aged 81); Newport, Rhode Island USA
- Occupations: Writer, Editor, Graphic Designer
- Writing career
- Subject: witchcraft

Elizabeth Pepper DaCosta (1923-2005) was the editor and publisher of The Witches’ Almanac, established in 1971. The company, founded in Newport, Rhode Island, produces an annual publication in almanac format as well as a variety of related books. In addition to her literary work, Pepper was an accomplished graphic designer.

== Early life ==
Born in Providence, November 7, 1923, she attended Pembroke College (Brown University) and the Rhode Island School of Design. As did other talented youngsters in the arts, Pepper moved to New York City after college. There she did graduate work with type designers Arnold Bank, Howard Trafton and Freeman Craw. She enjoyed living in Greenwich Village, the center of the art world during the fifties, and spent summer vacations in Provincetown or on Fire Island. In the mid 60's Elizabeth and her husband Martin moved to Walker Valley, N.Y. where they enjoyed a peaceful life at the foothills of the Shawangunk Mountains. In the mid 70's they returned to Newport, R.I.

== Career ==
Pepper served as the art director of Gourmet Magazine from 1956 to 1963, the first woman to hold the position. The publication was smaller than the contemporary version, but what it lacked in readership it offered in swank. Under the ownership of Earl MacAusland, its headquarters were in the penthouse of the Plaza Hotel. Pepper had a little office under the eaves with a view of Central Park looking toward the zoo, where on fine days lunch could be taken on the cafeteria terrace. Lunch music was often provided by the bark of seals enjoying their noontime fish. Mrs. Da Costa was best known as the founder, publisher and editor of The Witches’ Almanac, established in 1971 and still published annually.

== Personal life ==
Pepper was the daughter of Edward C. Pepper, a Providence real-estate developer, and Agnes Ryan Pepper. Elizabeth's mother and an aunt read the tarot and from childhood interested Elizabeth in the occult. She spent her adult years, parallel to her professional life, accumulating wisdom in the study of witchcraft, mythology, astrology, folklore, magic, rituals, and plant and animal lore. She was married to Martin Da Costa of Philadelphia, a sculptor and painter. Mr. Da Costa, deceased, was a veteran of World War II, and his work is part of permanent collections in Philadelphia, New York, and the West Coast. At the time of her death in 2005, at the age of eighty-one, her household included numerous dogs and cats, always part of the DaCosta home. She was attended during her last difficult year by a circle of loving friends.

== Bibliography ==
Elizabeth Pepper DaCosta was the author/editor/publisher/designer of eleven books, many illustrated by medieval woodcuts:

- The Witches' Almanac published yearly from 1971-1979 and from 1991-2005
- Magical and Mystical Sites: Europe and the British Isles (with John Wilcock)
- Magic Charms from A to Z
- Love Charms
- Celtic Tree Magic
- Moon Lore
- Magic Spells and Incantations
- Love Feasts
- A Book of Days (with John Wilcock)
- Magical Creatures (with Barbara Stacy)
- Ancient Roman Holidays (Barbara Stacy)
- Witches All
- Random Recollections I, II, III, IV
