= Kathleen Tankersley Young =

American poet and editor of the 1920s and 1930s

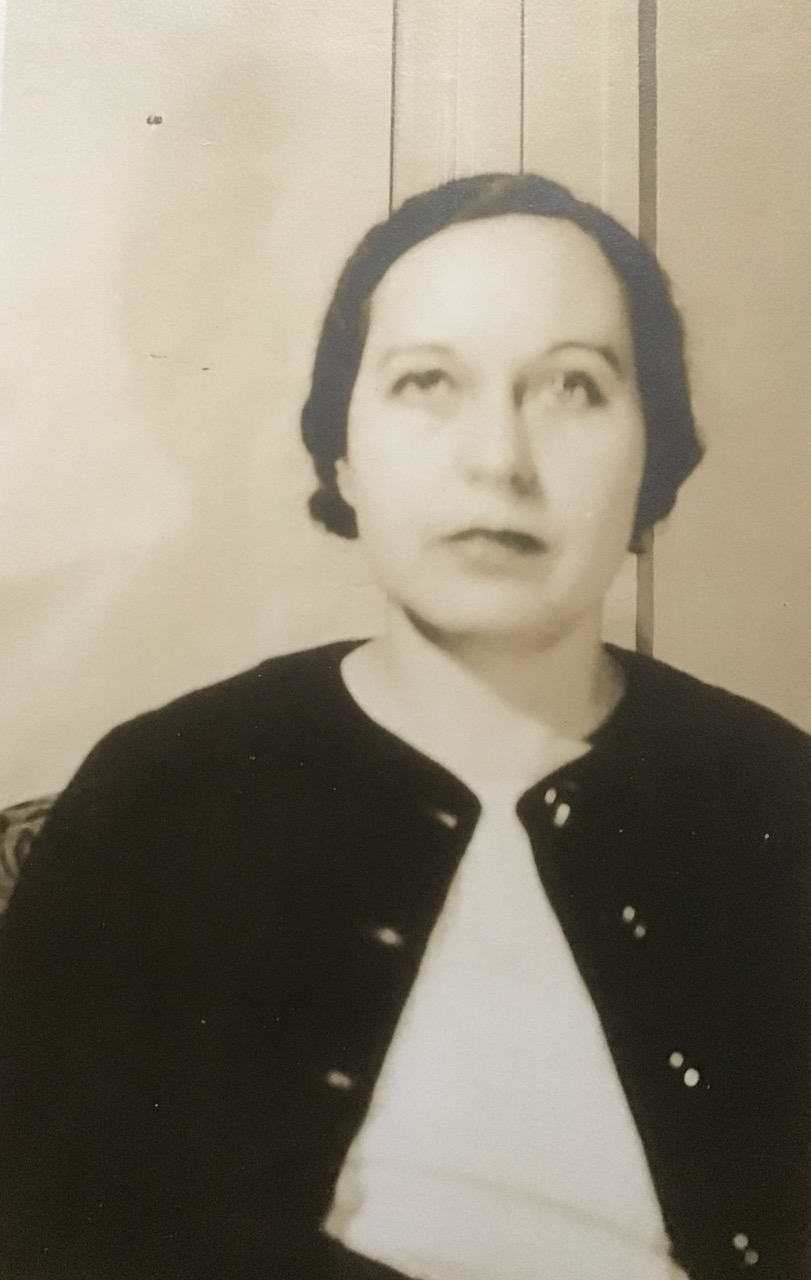
Kathleen Tankersley Young, American writer. Undated photo portrait from the private collection of Erik La Prade.

Kathleen Tankersley Young (August 15, 1902–April 9, 1933) was an American writer, poet, and editor active in publishing during the late 1920s and early 1930s. Although her work has received relatively little attention from scholars and publishers since her death, she published her poetry widely in the poetry magazines of her day and corresponded with a wide circle of literary friends, acquaintances, and collaborators. The literary scholar Eric White has written of Young: "Almost forgotten by literary history, Kathleen Tankersley Young's name appears like a cipher through little magazines of the late 1920s and early 1930s, and in anthologies of Harlem Renaissance and American women's poetry." In 2022 a volume consisting of the bulk of her works was published, entitled The Collected Works of Kathleen Tankersley Young.

== Life ==
Kathleen Tankersley Young was born in Texas on August 15, 1902. She married Henry Coulter Young on February 1, 1921. This first marriage ended when Henry Coulter Young died of tuberculosis in February, 1925. Kathleen Tankersley Young later married Air Force Lieutenant David Jerome Ellinger in 1929.

In 1929, Young served as an editor for Blues: A Magazine of New Rhythms along with her co-editors Charles Henri Ford and Parker Tyler. While only lasting a year, it published work by such contributors as Kay Boyle, Erskine Caldwell, Harry Crosby, E. E. Cummings, Oliver Jenkins, Ezra Pound, Laura Riding, Herman Spector, Gertrude Stein, Laurence Vail, William Carlos Williams, and Louis Zukofsky. The magazine was not financially sustainable, and was mostly funded by Lew Ney. There were only ten issues published. The first six magazines came out monthly while the last three were quarterly and final 10th issue sixty years later. With both a liberal and radical aesthetic orientation, Blues mainly published poems, short stories, other prose, and occasionally literary criticism.

When Blues ended, Young created Modern Editions Press, a new journal under her own imprint and published by Eric Naul. Two pamphlet series were published in 1932 and 1933. These included poems, short stories, and a statement by contributors Dudley Fitts, John Kemmerer, Kay Boyle, Kathleen Tankersley Young herself, Raymond Ellsworth Larsson and Albert Halper. Each piece of work was paired with an original print by a contemporary American artist. The second series comprised eight pamphlets with works by Lincoln Kirstein, Horace Gregory, Raymond Ellsworth Larsson, Kathleen Tankersley Young, Paul Bowles, Laurence Vail, Carl Rakosi, and Bob Brown.

Young visited Mexico in 1933, and died there unexpectedly. After her death the Modern Press Editions came to an end.

== Works ==
- Ten Poems. New York, NY: Parnassus Press, 1930.
- The Dark Land: Poems. Ithaca, NY: The Dragon Press, 1932.
- The Pepper Trees: A Cycle of Three Stories. New York, NY: Modern Editions Press, 1932.
- Apology for Love (three-page poem in pamphlet form). New York, NY: Modern Editions Press, 1933.

== Posthumous Publications ==
- "Selected Letters." Ed. Lew Ney and Ruth Widen. The Latin Quarter-ly, issue 1. September, 1933.
- “All Things Insensible” (poem). Writing Red: An Anthology of American Women Writers, 1930-1940. Ed. Charlotte Nekola & Paula Rabinowitz. New York: Feminist Press at the City University of New York, 1987.
- “December portrait”, “Hunger” (two poems). Shadowed Dreams: Women's Poetry of the Harlem Renaissance. Ed. Maureen Honey. New Brunswick: Rutgers University Press, 1989.
- "I am troubled at night", "In November the cold waterbirds", "Lily-poem", "San Cristobal", "There was a wall about him", "The days fall off like little leaves", "This hard mirror is a record", "Sheaf of images". Poems edited by Erik La Prade appearing in the article "Kathleen Tankersley Young". TETHER, Issue 3. Milton, PA: Sienese Shredder Editions, 2017. Pp 7-16.
- The Collected Works. Edited by Erik La Prade and Joshua Rothes. Seattle: Sublunary Editions, 2022.
