= Esteban Lisa =

Spanish painter

Esteban Lisa (1895–1983) was a painter from Spain, living almost his whole life in Buenos Aires, Argentina.

== Biography ==
Esteban Lisa was born in Hinojosa de San Vicente, Toledo (Spain) on August 8, 1895. At the age of 12 he emigrated to Argentina to live with his paternal aunt and uncle. He worked as a glass washer, then as a messenger - and later as a librarian - at Buenos Aires Central Post Office. At the same time he completed his primary studies. He entered the Beato Angélico Art School, where he studied with Friar Guillermo Butler. He taught painting in the School for Adults, located at number 900 Serrano (Buenos Aires), and joined the Argentine Teachers' Union. He married the Doctor of Philosophy and Letters, Josefina Pierini.

His pictorial production continued almost uninterrupted from the 1930s until 1978, and was complemented by his studies of philosophy and science. His mystic conception of life and art was to accompany him always: abstraction was his chosen means of visual communication. He was not interested in following a career as an artist-painter, and perceived that his role in society would be not only to teach the techniques of painting, but also to contribute to the spiritual development of human beings, by carefully preserving his work for future generations.

His short book Kant, Einstein and Picasso, published in 1956, which he circulated among friends and cultural institutions, was to highlight his main preferences. His literary production totals 14 books, written and published, including The Theory of Cosmovision and The Vision of Plato.

Lisa owned an extensive library, comprising over 900 books on philosophy, oriental religions and art, which is now located in the headquarters of the Esteban Lisa Foundation.

In 1955, the year in which he retired from his official teaching duties, with the support of his disciples, Lisa founded his own center, known as the "Four Dimensions Modern Art School", located at 1966 Rivadavia, Buenos Aires. His "Institute for Research into the Theory of Cosmovision" was opened later at 1535 Alsina.

Between 1956 and 1979 Lisa gave numerous conferences in Buenos Aires, Montevideo, Paraná, Gualeguay and Azul on his Theory of Cosmovision, his means of uniting aesthetic experiences, ethics and modern science.

He travelled to Spain to be reunited with his family in 1981. He died in Buenos Aires on June 19, 1983.

== Work ==
Lisa was not only a pioneer of this art form in terms of Latin American Art, but also in the context of Spanish abstraction. His work was never shown during his lifetime. Since his death, his work has gained international recognition from collectors, art critics and the general public.

Lisa worked in the realm of abstraction from c.1935 to 1978.

Lisa’s work began to be studied and catalogued in 1996, a decade after an exhibition held in the Museum Sivori of Buenos Aires in 1987 passed unnoticed. One-man exhibitions were held in Buenos Aires (Galería Palatina, 1997) and Madrid (Guillermo de Osma, 1998). Museum shows were held on Rosario (1997), Montevideo (1998) and Cordoba (1999). Other exhibitions included a large retrospective in the Buenos Aires Museo Nacional de Bellas Artes (July 1999) and in Santa Fe (November 1999). He was also shown in ARCO (Madrid, 1987, 1988, 1999) and FIAC (Paris, 1997, 1998) Art Fairs.

In 2008 the exhibition "Dialogues with Esteban Lisa" took place in Cuenca, Fundación Antonio Pérez, with more than 50 paintings and drawings.

In 2010, Lisa's work was shown for the first time in the Middle East through a comprehensive exhibition at the Foundation Audi in Beirut, Lebanon.

From 1 February - 20 May 2017, the Museu Fundación Juan March, Palma exhibited Esteban Lisa. The Abstract Cabinet a show of “37 works produced between 1930 and 1968.” The exhibit traveled to Museo de Arte Abstracto Español, Cuenca (2 June - 3 September 2017) and McMullen Museum of Art, Boston College, Boston (15 September - 10 December 2017).

== External links and references ==
- http://www.estebanlisa.com/homeingles.swf
- https://web.archive.org/web/20050824170432/http://www2.essex.ac.uk/arthistory/arara/issue_two/abstracts.html
- https://web.archive.org/web/20090525012440/http://www.dipucuenca.es/aplicaciones/publico/agenda3.asp?idagenda=149
