= Mairehe Louise Tankersley =

New Zealand social worker and prisoners' welfare advocate

Mairehe Louise Tankersley MNZM
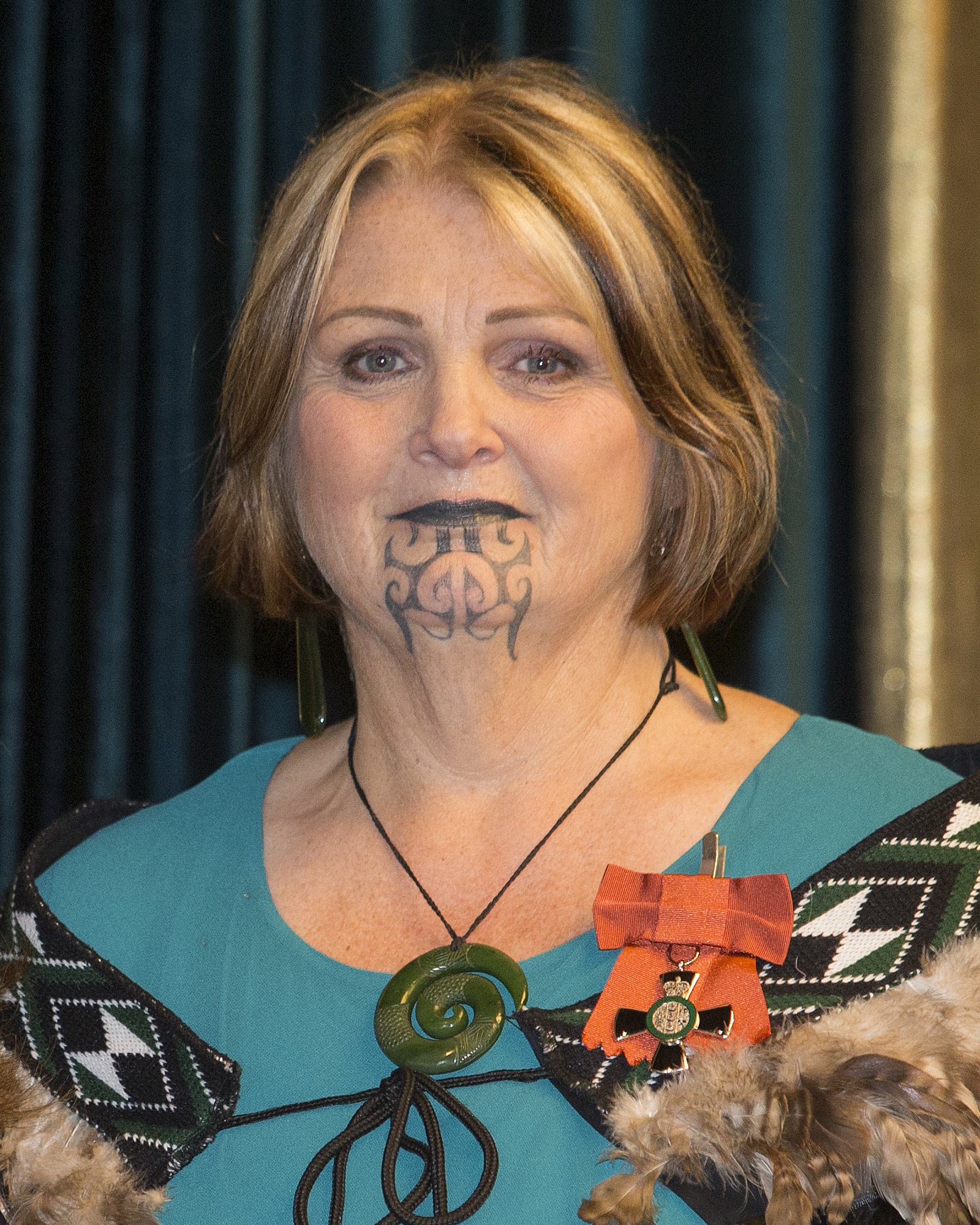
- Tankersley in 2021
- Awards: Member of the New Zealand Order of Merit

Mairehe Louise Marie Tankersley MNZM is a New Zealand social worker. In 2021, Tankersley was appointed a Member of the New Zealand Order of Merit for services to prisoners' welfare and Māori.

== Career ==
Tankersley is Māori and affiliates to Kāi Tahu, Kāti Irakehu, and Kāti Huikai iwi.

Tankersley was an administrative assistant at Lincoln University from 1989, in the Centre for Māori Studies and Research. She was later Associate Director at the centre.

Tankersley was chair of the Te Rūnaka ki Ōtautahi o Kāi Tahu Trust. In 2021 she was appointed to the senior management of the Christchurch Women's Prison as Pou Tikanga of the Mana Wāhine Māori Pathway programme. She had been Kaiwhakamana (advocate) and had been delivering tikanga Māori programmes at the prison for fourteen years prior to the creation of the Pou Tikanga role. In 2023 Tankersley supported the first te reo Māori muster at the prison, which was held at 2pm on 14 September, to commemorate the moment the Māori Language Petition was presented to Parliament in 1972.

== Earthquake ==
When the Christchurch earthquake occurred on 22 February 2011, Tankersley was leading a cultural awareness workshop on the fifth floor of the CTV Building. She had her 8 month old daughter with her, and they were both rescued from the rubble after the building collapsed and caught fire. Tankersley was injured in the fall to ground level, breaking several ribs. Tankersley has talked publicly about the trauma of the earthquake, the effects it had on her and her daughter, and the work that was required before she could talk about it to the press.

== Honours and awards ==
In the 2021 Queen's Birthday Honours, Tankersley was appointed a Member of the New Zealand Order of Merit for services to prisoners' welfare and Māori.
