= Parker Tyler =

American writer (1904–1974)

- Born: March 6, 1904; New Orleans, Louisiana, U.S.
- Died: July 24, 1974 (aged 70); New York City, New York, U.S.
- Occupations: Author, poet, film critic
- Known for: Screening the Sexes
- Notable work: The Young and Evil
- Partner: Charles Boultenhouse (1945–1974)

Harrison Parker Tyler (March 6, 1904 – July 24, 1974), was an American author, poet, and film critic.

== Career ==
Tyler co-authored The Young and Evil, in 1933 with writer Charles Henri Ford. The work was one of the first openly gay American novels and written in an experimental style, influenced by Gertrude Stein and Djuna Barnes. The book follows young artists occupying the queer fringe of Greenwich Village, and it presents their gender, sexuality, and sexual activity frankly. Stein praised the novel in a blurb she wrote for it: "The Young and Evil creates this generation as This Side of Paradise by Fitzgerald created his generation."

The landmark novel faced censorship immediately. Several American and British publishers rejected the manuscript before Obelisk Press in Paris agreed to publish it. Officials in the U.K. and U.S. prevented shipments of the novel from reaching bookstores, and the book was banned for over 30 years in the U.S.

Tyler often wrote for View, Kenyon Review, Partisan Review, Evergreen Review, and the cineaste magazines Film Culture, and Film Quarterly. Some of his books are collections of his magazine work. He received a Longview Award for Poetry in 1958. He wrote a biography about modernist painter Florine Stettheimer.

Tyler was mentioned several times in the novel Myra Breckinridge (1968) by Gore Vidal, bringing renewed attention to Tyler's film criticism. This led Vidal to claim that "I've done for [Tyler] what Edward Albee did for Virginia Woolf" after The Hollywood Hallucination and Magic and Myth of the Movies were republished in 1970.

Black Sparrow Press published his poetry, including a complete and corrected text of The Granite Butterfly, first published with Bern Porter, Berkeley, Calif., 1945, as The Will of Eros: Selected Poems 1930-1970 (1972).

== Personal life ==
Tyler had a relationship with underground filmmaker Charles Boultenhouse (1926–1994) from 1945 until his death. Their papers are held by the New York Public Library.

Tyler died in New York City, where he lived, on July 24, 1974, at the age of 70.

== Works ==
Tyler's novels and books of film criticism include:

- The Young and Evil, with Charles Henri Ford (Paris: Obelisk Press, 1933)
- The Hollywood Hallucination (New York: Creative Age, 1944)
- Magic and Myth of the Movies (New York: Henry Holt and Company, 1947)
- Chaplin: Last of the Clowns (New York: The Vanguard Press, 1948)
- The Three Faces of the Film: the Art, the Dream, the Cult (New York: Thomas Yoseloff, 1960)
- Classics of the Foreign Film: A Pictorial Treasury (Secaucus, NJ: Citadel Press, 1962)
- Sex Psyche Etcetera in the Film (New York: Horizon Press, 1969)
- The Divine Comedy of Pavel Tchelitchew: A Biography (Fleet Publishing, 1967)
- Underground Film: A Critical History (New York: Grove Press, 1969)
- Screening the Sexes: Homosexuality in the Movies (New York: Holt, Rinehart & Winston, 1972)
- The Shadow of an Airplane Climbs the Empire State Building (Garden City, NY: Doubleday, 1973)
- A Pictorial History of Sex in Films (Secaucus, NJ: Citadel Press, 1974)

== See also ==
- List of gay novels prior to the Stonewall riots
