= Gay literature =

Literary genre

Gay literature is a collective term for literature produced by or for the gay community which involves characters, plot lines, and/or themes portraying male homosexual behavior.

== Overview and history ==
Because the social acceptance of homosexuality has varied in many world cultures throughout history, LGBTQ literature has covered a vast array of themes and concepts. LGBTQ individuals have often turned to literature as a source of validation, understanding, and beautification of same-sex attraction. In contexts where homosexuality has been perceived negatively, LGBT literature may also document the psychological stresses and alienation suffered by those experiencing prejudice, legal discrimination, AIDS, self-loathing, bullying, violence, religious condemnation, denial, suicide, persecution, and other such obstacles.

Themes of love between individuals of the same gender are found in a variety of ancient texts throughout the world. The ancient Greeks, in particular, explored the theme on a variety of different levels in such works as Plato's Symposium.

=== Ancient mythology ===
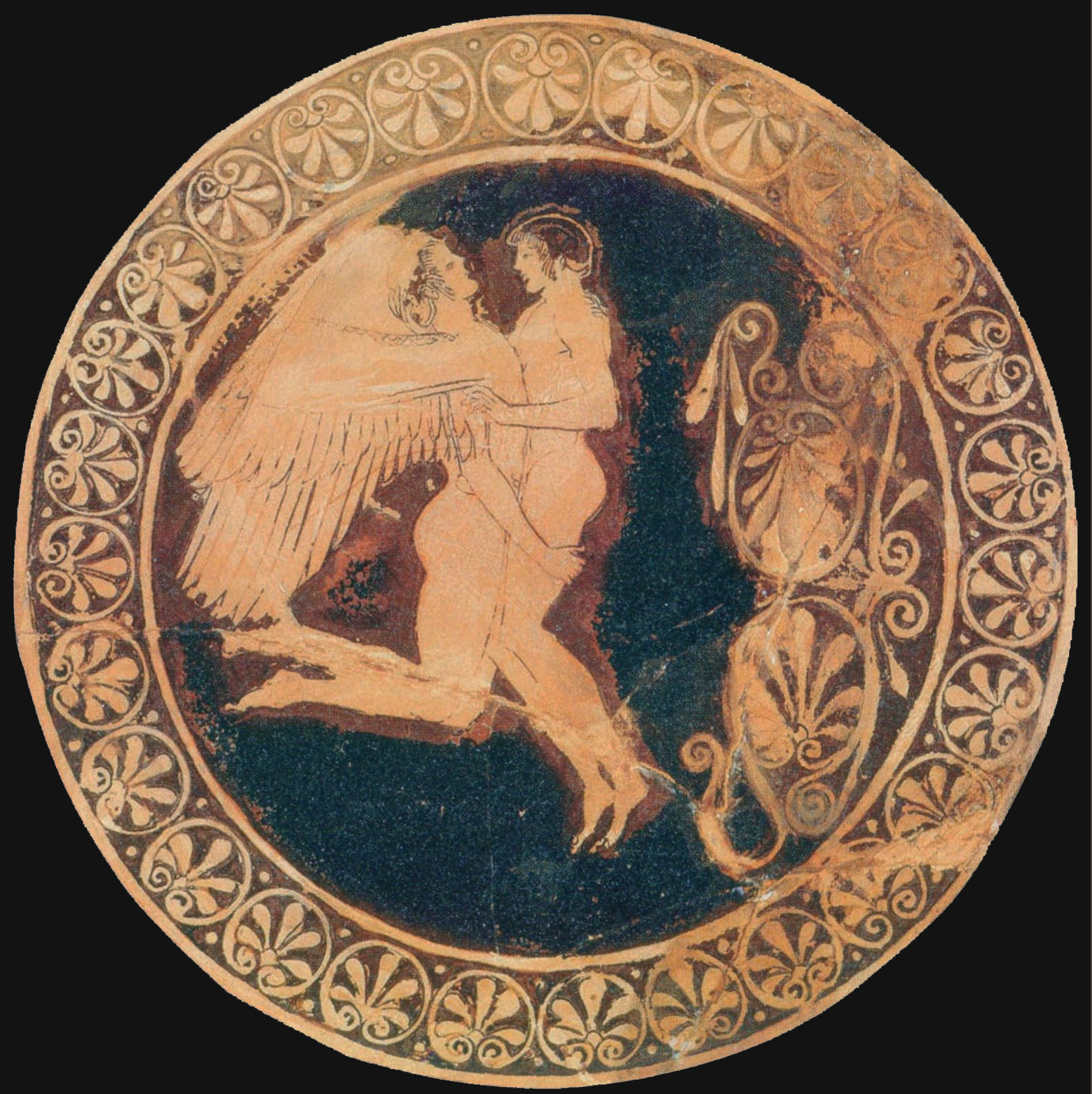
Zephyrus and Hyakinthos: Greek myths often feature homosexuality and are a source for much modern speculative fiction. Mythic figures continue to appear in fantasy stories.

Many mythologies and religious narratives include stories of romantic affection or sexuality between men or feature divine actions that result in changes in gender. These myths have been interpreted as forms of LGBT expression and modern conceptions of sexuality and gender have been applied to them. Myths have been used by individual cultures, in part, to explain and validate their particular social institutions or to explain the cause of transgender identity or homosexuality.

In classical mythology, male lovers were attributed to ancient Greek gods and heroes such as Zeus, Apollo, Poseidon and Heracles (including Ganymede, Hyacinth, Nerites and Hylas, respectively) as a reflection and validation of the tradition of pederasty.

=== Early works ===
Though Homer did not explicitly portray the heroes Achilles and Patroclus as homosexual lovers in his 8th-century BC Trojan War epic, the Iliad, later ancient authors presented the intense relationship as such. In his 5th-century BC lost tragedy The Myrmidons, Aeschylus casts Achilles and Patroclus as pederastic lovers. In a surviving fragment of the play, Achilles speaks of "our frequent kisses" and a "devout union of the thighs". Plato does the same in his Symposium (385–370 BC); the speaker Phaedrus cites Aeschylus and holds Achilles up as an example of how people will be more brave and even sacrifice themselves for their lovers. In his oration Against Timarchus, Aeschines argues that though Homer "hides their love and avoids giving a name to their friendship", Homer assumed that educated readers would understand the "exceeding greatness of their affection". Plato's Symposium also includes a creation myth that explains homo- and heterosexuality (Aristophanes speech) and celebrates the pederastic tradition and erotic love between men (Pausanias speech), as does another of his dialogues, Phaedrus.

The tradition of pederasty in ancient Greece (as early as 650 BC) and later the acceptance of limited homosexuality in ancient Rome infused an awareness of male-male attraction and sex into ancient poetry. In the second of Virgil's Eclogues (1st century BC), the shepherd Corydon proclaims his love for the boy Alexis. Some of the erotic poetry of Catullus in the same century is directed at other men (Carmen 48, 50, and 99), and in a wedding hymn (Carmen 61) he portrays a male concubine about to be supplanted by his master's future wife. The first line of his infamous invective Carmen 16—which has been called "one of the filthiest expressions ever written in Latin—or in any other language, for that matter"—contains explicit homosexual sex acts.

The Satyricon by Petronius is a Latin work of fiction detailing the misadventures of Encolpius and his lover, a handsome and promiscuous sixteen-year-old servant boy named Giton. Written in the 1st century AD during the reign of Nero, it is the earliest known text of its kind depicting homosexuality.

In the celebrated Japanese work The Tale of Genji, written by Murasaki Shikibu in the early 11th century, the title character Hikaru Genji is rejected by the lady Utsusemi in chapter 3 and instead sleeps with her young brother: "Genji pulled the boy down beside him ... Genji, for his part, or so one is informed, found the boy more attractive than his chilly sister."

Antonio Rocco's Alcibiades the Schoolboy, published anonymously in 1652, is an Italian dialogue written as a defense of homosexual sodomy. The first such explicit work known to be written since ancient times, its intended purpose as a "Carnivalesque satire", a defense of pederasty, or a work of pornography is unknown, and debated.

Several medieval European works contain references to homosexuality, such as in Giovanni Boccaccio's Decameron or Lanval, a French lai, in which the knight Lanval is accused by Guinevere of having "no desire for women". Others include homosexual themes, like Yde et Olive.

=== 18th and 19th centuries ===
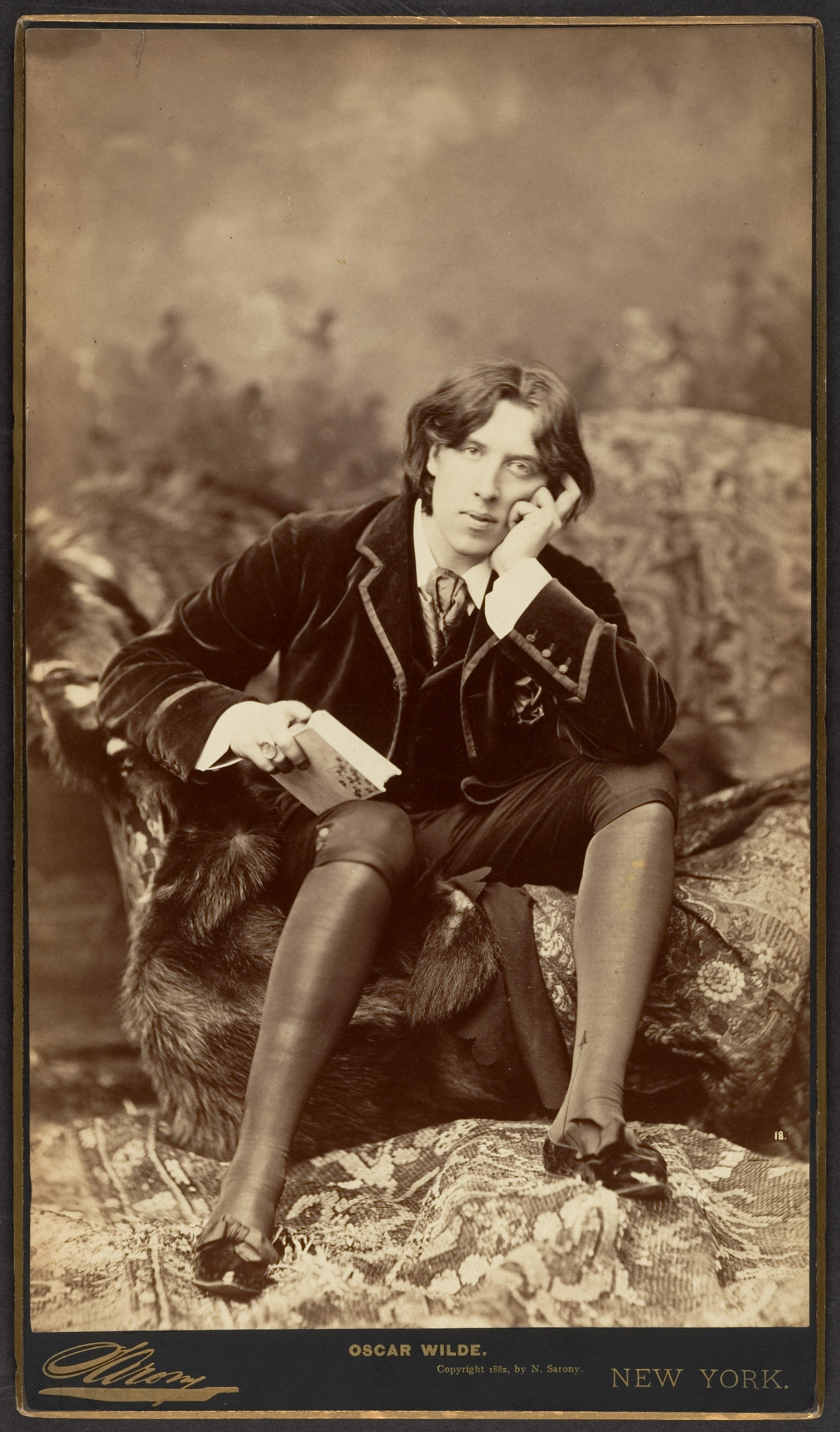
Oscar Wilde, a gay writer of the 19th century who included allusions to homosexuality in works such as The Picture of Dorian Gray. Wilde was jailed for homosexual relations in 1895.

The era known as the Age of Enlightenment (the 1650s to the 1780s) gave rise to, in part, a general challenge to the traditional doctrines of society in Western Europe. A particular interest in the Classical era of Greece and Rome "as a model for contemporary life" put the Greek appreciation of nudity, the male form and male friendship (and the inevitable homoerotic overtones) into art and literature. It was common for gay authors at this time to include allusions to Greek mythological characters as a code that homosexual readers would recognize. Gay men of the period "commonly understood ancient Greece and Rome to be societies where homosexual relationships were tolerated and even encouraged", and references to those cultures might identify an author or book's sympathy with gay readers and gay themes but probably be overlooked by straight readers. Despite the "increased visibility of queer behavior" and prospering networks of male prostitution in cities like Paris and London, homosexual activity had been outlawed in England (and by extension, the United States) as early as the Buggery Act 1533. Across much of Europe in the 1700s and 1800s, the legal punishment for sodomy was death, making it dangerous to publish or distribute anything with overt gay themes. James Jenkins of Valancourt Books noted:

These sorts of coded, subtextual ways of writing about homosexuality were often necessary, since up until the 1950s British authors could be prosecuted for writing openly about homosexuality, and in the U.S., authors and publishers could also face legal action and suppression of their books, not to mention social or moral condemnation that might end an author's career.

Many early Gothic fiction authors, like Matthew Lewis, William Thomas Beckford and Francis Lathom, were homosexual, and would sublimate these themes and express them in more acceptable forms, using transgressive genres like Gothic and horror fiction. The title character of Lewis's The Monk (1796) falls in love with young novice Rosario, and though Rosario is later revealed to be a woman named Matilda, the gay subtext is clear. A similar situation occurs in Charles Maturin's The Fatal Revenge (1807) when the valet Cyprian asks his master, Ippolito, to kiss him as though he were Ippolito's lover; later Cyprian is also revealed to be a woman. In Maturin's Melmoth the Wanderer (1820), the close friendship between a young monk and a new novice is scrutinized as potentially "too like love". Sheridan Le Fanu's novella Carmilla (1872) was the first lesbian vampire story, and influenced Bram Stoker's Dracula (1897). Stoker's novel has its own homoerotic aspects, as when Count Dracula warns off the female vampires and claims Jonathan Harker, saying "This man belongs to me!"

A Year in Arcadia: Kyllenion (1805) by Augustus, Duke of Saxe-Gotha-Altenburg is "the earliest known novel that centers on an explicitly male-male love affair". Set in ancient Greece, the German novel features several couples—including a homosexual one—falling in love, overcoming obstacles and living happily ever after. The Romantic movement gaining momentum at the end of the 18th century allowed men to "express deep affection for each other", and the motif of ancient Greece as "a utopia of male-male love" was an acceptable vehicle to reflect this, but some of Duke August's contemporaries felt that his characters "stepped over the bounds of manly affection into unseemly eroticism." The first American gay novel was Joseph and His Friend: A Story of Pennsylvania (1870) by Bayard Taylor, the story of a newly engaged young man who finds himself instead falling in love with another man. Robert K. Martin called it "quite explicit in its adoption of a political stance toward homosexuality" and notes that the character Philip "argues for the 'rights' of those 'who cannot shape themselves according to the common-place pattern of society.'" Henry Blake Fuller's 1898 play, At St. Judas's, and 1919 novel, Bertram Cope's Year, are noted as among the earliest published American works in literature on the theme of homosexual relationships.

The new "atmosphere of frankness" created by the Enlightenment sparked the production of pornography like John Cleland's infamous Fanny Hill (1749), which features a rare graphic scene of male homosexual sex. Published anonymously a century later, The Sins of the Cities of the Plain (1881) and Teleny, or The Reverse of the Medal (1893) are two of the earliest pieces of English-language pornography to explicitly and near-exclusively concern homosexuality. The Sins of the Cities of the Plain is about a male prostitute, and is set in London around the time of the Cleveland Street Scandal and the Oscar Wilde trials. Teleny, chronicling a passionate affair between a Frenchman and a Hungarian pianist, is often attributed to a collaborative effort by Wilde and some of his contemporaries. Wilde's more mainstream The Picture of Dorian Gray (1890) still shocked readers with its sensuality and overtly homosexual characters. Drew Banks called Dorian Gray a groundbreaking gay character because he was "one of the first in a long list of hedonistic fellows whose homosexual tendencies secured a terrible fate." The French realist Émile Zola in his novel Nana (1880) depicted, along with a wide variety of heterosexual couplings and some lesbian scenes, a single homosexual character, Labordette. Paris theater society and the demi-monde are long accustomed to his presence and role as go-between; he knows all the women, escorts them, and runs errands for them. He is "a parasite, with even a touch of pimp", but also a more sympathetic figure than most of the men, as much a moral coward as them but physically brave and not a stereotype. (Note: In chapter XXI of his 1912 novel The Gods Are Athirst, Zola depicts a brief failed attempt at a same-sex liaison. Julie has been wearing men's clothing to avoid being recognized. A middle-aged man who has on occasion followed her invites her to share his umbrella. Startled by her voice when she accepts, he runs away. "She suddenly understood, and despite her worries could not prevent herself from smiling.")

=== 20th century ===
By the 20th century, discussion of homosexuality became more open and society's understanding of it evolved. A number of novels with explicitly gay themes and characters began to appear in the domain of mainstream or art literature.

==== 1900s–1920s ====
Nobel Prize-winner André Gide's semi-autobiographical novel The Immoralist (1902) finds a newly married man reawakened by his attraction to a series of young Arab boys. Though Bayard Taylor's Joseph and His Friend (1870) had been the first American gay novel, Edward Prime-Stevenson's Imre: A Memorandum (1906) was the first in which the homosexual couple were happy and united at the end. Initially published privately under the pseudonym "Xavier Mayne", it tells the story of a British aristocrat and a Hungarian soldier whose new friendship turns into love. In Thomas Mann's 1912 novella Death in Venice, a tightly wound, aging writer finds himself increasingly infatuated with a young Polish boy. Marcel Proust's serialized novel In Search of Lost Time (1913–1927) and Gide's The Counterfeiters (1925) also explore homosexual themes. Some of the authors of the predominantly "closet era" also hid gay characters in female bodies, which Edmund White called Proust's Albertine strategy.

British author E.M. Forster earned a prominent reputation as a novelist while concealing his own homosexuality from the broader British public. In 1913–14, he privately penned Maurice, a bildungsroman that follows a young, upper-middle-class man through the self-discovery of his own attraction to other men, two relationships, and his interactions with an often uncomprehending or hostile society. The book is notable for its affirming tone and happy ending. "A happy ending was imperative", wrote Forster, "I was determined that in fiction anyway, two men should fall in love and remain in it for the ever and ever that fiction allows ... Happiness is its keynote." The book was not published until 1971, after Forster's death. William J. Mann said of the novel, "[Alec Scudder of Maurice was] a refreshingly unapologetic young gay man who was not an effete Oscar Wilde aristocrat, but rather a working class, masculine, ordinary guy ... an example of the working class teaching the privileged class about honesty and authenticity — a bit of a stereotype now, but back then quite extraordinary."

In Germany in 1920, Erwin von Busse published a collection of short stories about erotic encounters between men using the pseudonym Granand. Promptly banned for "indecency", it was not republished until 1993 and only appeared in an English translation as Berlin Garden of Erotic Delights in 2022. "Smoke, Lilies, and Jade" by gay author and artist Richard Bruce Nugent, published in 1926, was the first short story by an African-American writer openly addressing his homosexuality. Written in a modernist stream-of-consciousness style, its subject was bisexuality and interracial male desire.

==== 1930s–1940s ====
Blair Niles's Strange Brother (1931), about the platonic relationship between a heterosexual woman and a gay man in New York City in the late 1920s and early 1930s, is an early, objective exploration of homosexual issues during the Harlem Renaissance. Though praised for its journalistic approach, sympathetic nature and promotion of tolerance and compassion, the novel has been numbered among a group of early gay novels that is "cast in the form of a tragic melodrama" and, according to editor and author Anthony Slide, illustrates the "basic assumption that gay characters in literature must come to a tragic end."

Forman Brown's 1933 novel Better Angel, published under the pseudonym Richard Meeker, is an early novel that describes a gay lifestyle without condemning it. Christopher Carey called it "the first homosexual novel with a truly happy ending". Slide names only four familiar gay novels of the first half of the 20th century in English: Djuna Barnes' Nightwood (1936), Carson McCullers' Reflections in a Golden Eye (1941), Truman Capote's Other Voices, Other Rooms (1948) and Gore Vidal's The City and the Pillar (1948). In John O'Hara's 1935 novel BUtterfield 8, the principal female character Gloria Wondrous has a friend Ann Paul, who in school "was suspect because of a couple of crushes which ... her former schoolmates were too free about calling lesbian, and Gloria did not think so". Gloria speculates that "there was a little of that in practically all women", considers her own experience with women making passes, and rejects her own theory.

The story of a young man who is coming of age and discovers his own homosexuality, The City and the Pillar (1946) is recognized as the first post-World War II novel whose openly gay and well-adjusted protagonist is not killed off at the end of the story for defying social norms. It is also one of the "definitive war-influenced gay novels", one of the few books of its period dealing directly with male homosexuality. The City and the Pillar has also been called "the most notorious of the gay novels of the 1940s and 1950s." It sparked a public scandal, including notoriety and criticism, because it was released at a time when homosexuality was commonly considered immoral and because it was the first book by an accepted American author to portray overt homosexuality as a natural behavior. Upon its release, The New York Times refused to publish advertisements for the novel and Vidal was blacklisted to the extent that no major newspaper or magazine would review any of his novels for six years. Modern scholars note the importance of the novel to the visibility of gay literature. Michael Bronski points out that "gay-male-themed books received greater critical attention than lesbian ones" and that "writers such as Gore Vidal were accepted as important American writers, even when they received attacks from homophobic critics." Ian Young notes that social disruptions of World War II changed public morals, and lists The City and the Pillar among a spate of war novels that use the military as a backdrop for overt homosexual behavior.

Other notable works of the 1940s include Jean Genet's semiautobiographical Our Lady of the Flowers (1943) and The Thief's Journal (1949), and Yukio Mishima's Confessions of a Mask (1949).

==== 1950s ====
Mary Renault's The Charioteer, a 1953 British war novel about homosexual men in and out of the military, quickly became a bestseller within the gay community. Renault's historical novels The Last of the Wine (1956) — about Athenian pederasty in ancient Greece — and The Persian Boy (1972) — about Alexander the Great and his slave lover Bagoas — followed suit. A Room in Chelsea Square (1958) by British author Michael Nelson—about a wealthy gentleman who lures an attractive younger man to London with the promise of an uppercrust lifestyle—was originally published anonymously both because of its explicit gay content at a time when homosexuality was still illegal, and because its characters were "thinly veiled portrayals of prominent London literary figures".

A key element of Allen Drury's 1959 bestselling and Pulitzer Prize-winning political novel Advise and Consent is the blackmailing of young US senator Brigham Anderson, who is hiding a secret wartime homosexual tryst. In 2009, The Wall Street Journal's Scott Simon wrote of Drury that "the conservative Washington novelist was more progressive than Hollywood liberals", noting that the character Anderson is "candid and unapologetic" about his affair, and even calling him "Drury's most appealing character". Frank Rich wrote in The New York Times in 2005:

For a public official to be identified as gay in the Washington of the 50s and 60s meant not only career suicide but also potentially actual suicide. Yet Drury, a staunchly anti-Communist conservative of his time, regarded the character as sympathetic, not a villain. The senator's gay affair, he wrote, was "purely personal and harmed no one else."

Other notable works of the 1950s include The Heart in Exile (1953) by Rodney Garland, the first gay detective novel; Umberto Saba's Ernesto (written in 1953, published posthumously in 1975); and Giovanni's Room (1956) by James Baldwin.

==== 1960s ====
Gillian Freeman's 1961 novel The Leather Boys, originally published under the pseudonym Eliot George, tells the story of a gay relationship between two young working-class men in London, one married and the other a biker. It was the first novel to focus on love between young working-class men rather than aristocrats. James Baldwin followed Giovanni's Room with Another Country (1962), a "controversial bestseller" that "explicitly combines racial and sexual protests ... structured around the lives of eight racially, regionally, socioeconomically, and sexually diverse characters." John Rechy's City of Night (1963) and Numbers (1967) are graphic tales of male hustlers; City of Night has been called a "landmark novel" that "marked a radical departure from all other novels of its kind, and gave voice to a subculture that had never before been revealed with such acuity." Claude J. Summers wrote of Christopher Isherwood's A Single Man (1964):

A Single Man more fully develops the context of gay oppression than do [Isherwood's] earlier novels ... To portray homosexuals as simply another tribe in a nation comprising many different tribes is both to soften the stigma linked to homosexuality and to encourage solidarity among gay people. And by associating the mistreatment of homosexuals with the discrimination suffered by other minorities in America, Isherwood legitimizes the grievances of gay people at a time when homosexuals were not recognized either as a genuine minority or as valuable members of the human community. Presaging the gay liberation movement, A Single Man presents homosexuality as simply a human variation that should be accorded value and respect and depicts homosexuals as a group whose grievances should be redressed.

George Baxt's A Queer Kind of Death (1966) introduced Pharaoh Love, the first gay black detective in fiction. The novel was met with considerable acclaim, and The New York Times critic Anthony Boucher wrote, "This is a detective story, and unlike any other that you have read. No brief review can attempt to convey its quality. I merely note that it deals with a Manhattan subculture wholly devoid of ethics or morality, that said readers may well find it 'shocking', that it is beautifully plotted and written with elegance and wit ... and that you must under no circumstances miss it." Love would be the central figure in two immediate sequels Swing Low Sweet Harriet (1967) and Topsy and Evil (1968) and also two later novels, A Queer Kind of Love (1994) and A Queer Kind of Umbrella (1995). Though released the same year that homosexual acts were partially decriminalised in England and Wales by the Sexual Offences Act 1967, the 1967 gay thriller The Wrong People by British author Robin Maugham was originally published under the pseudonym David Griffin because its frank depiction of pederasty and sex trafficking were considered so scandalous. In his controversial 1968 satire Myra Breckinridge, Gore Vidal explored the mutability of gender-roles and sexual-orientation as being social constructs established by social mores, making the eponymous heroine a transsexual waging a "war against gender roles".

In 1969, Taiwanese author Lin Hwai-min published "Cicada" in his short story collection of the same name, Cicada. "Cicada" follows the lives of several college students living in Ximending, Taipei, who explore and struggle with expressing homosexual desires for each other.

In Taiwan, during the martial law period (1949–1987), the Kuomintang government focused on strengthening Taiwan's industrial and economic power and reinforcing traditional Confucian values on society. The heterosexual image of the modern family dominated, and "public discourses of same-sex desire were almost non-existent." Nevertheless, Pai Hsien-yung's Jade Love (1960), "Moon Dream" (1960), "Youthfulness" (1961), and "Seventeen Years Old and Lonely" (1961) — novellas and short stories exploring male homosexual desire — were published in Xiandai Wenxue. He published "A Sky Full of Bright, Twinkling Stars" in 1969, which follows gay characters who frequent Taipei's New Park area and would appear in Pai's 1983 novel Crystal Boys. Crystal Boys is set in 1970s Taipei and covers the main character Li-Qing's life after he is expelled from school for engaging in sexual relations with his classmate Zhao Ying. It is commonly identified as "the first Chinese novel that depicts the life struggles in the homosexual community [and] grew out of the particular socio-historical environment of Taiwan in the 1970s." Other works published in Taiwan in the early 1960s include Chiang Kuei's Double Suns (1961), with depictions of male homosexual desire, and Kuo Liang-hui's Green Is the Grass (1963), which follows two Taiwanese middle school boys who exhibit sexual and romantic desires toward each other. The status of Double Suns in the Taiwanese gay literature scene has been questioned since male homosexuality is not the main focus of the work. On this, Chi Ta-wei comments on its influence and significance in the history of homosexual literature in Taiwan, writing that "[t]o underestimate [the characters of Double Suns] and deem them 'not homosexual enough' is to truncate the history of literature and to regulate the ever-elusive homosexuality to a confined definition."

==== 1970s ====
Fifteen years after Advise and Consent, Drury wrote about the unrequited love of one male astronaut for another in his 1971 novel The Throne of Saturn, and in his two-part tale of ancient Egyptian Pharaoh Akhenaten's attempt to change Egyptian religion—A God Against the Gods (1976) and Return to Thebes (1977)—Akhenaten's romance with his brother Smenkhkara contributes to his downfall. Tormented homosexual North McAllister is one of the ensemble of Alpha Zeta fraternity brothers and their families that Drury follows over the course of 60 years in his University novels (1990–1998), as well as René Suratt—villain and "bisexual seducer of students"—and the tragic lovers Amos Wilson and Joel. Assessing Drury's body of work in 1999, Erik Tarloff suggested in The New York Times that "homosexuality does appear to be the only minority status to which Drury seems inclined to accord much sympathy."

Though Thomas Pynchon's Gravity's Rainbow (1973) was unanimously recommended by the Pulitzer Prize fiction jury to receive the 1974 award, the Pulitzer board chose instead to make no award that year. In 2005 Time named the novel one of its "All-Time 100 Greatest Novels", a list of the best English language novels from 1923 to 2005. Other notable novels from the 1970s include Manuel Puig's Kiss of the Spider Woman (1976), Andrew Holleran's Dancer from the Dance (1978), and Tales of the City (1978), the first volume of Armistead Maupin's long-running Tales of the City series. David Jackson of The New York Review of Books wrote in 1979, "Homosexual love and/or attraction have become such standard spices in today's fiction, one no longer is surprised at the taste in the dish."

==== 1980s–1990s ====
In the 1980s, Edmund White — who had cowritten the 1977 gay sex manual The Joy of Gay Sex — published the semiautobiographical novels A Boy's Own Story (1982) and The Beautiful Room Is Empty (1988). Bret Easton Ellis also came to prominence with Less than Zero (1985), The Rules of Attraction (1987) and later American Psycho (1991). Nobel Prize winner Roger Martin du Gard's unfinished Lieutenant-Colonel de Maumort, written between 1941 and 1958, was published posthumously in 1983. It explores adolescent homosexual relations and includes a fictional first-person account, written in 1944, of a brief tragic encounter between a young soldier and a bakery apprentice in rural France.

Colombian-born gay author Fernando Vallejo on 1994 published his semi-autobiographical novel Our Lady of the Assassins. The novel deals with the topic of homosexuality in a secondary way, but it is notable for being set in the context of a Latin American country where it is a taboo.

Taiwanese author Chu T'ien-wen's Notes of a Desolate Man (1994) is written from the first-person perspective of a Taiwanese gay man. Chu compiled the experience of gay men in various cultures as portrayed through media to construct the narrative of Notes of a Desolate Man. The novel has often been criticized by Taiwanese critics for its fragmentary structure and narrative, due to Chu's frequent use of quotations and references. Chu's "presumably heterosexual" and female identity has also inspired various different readings of the novel, as well as "a tension that has been used to serve very different sorts of sexual politics."

The following year, Chi Ta-wei published Sensory World (1995), which is composed of short stories that are significant because of their explicit discussion of sex, sexuality, gender, transgender identity, and male homosexual desire. In 1997, Chi published Queer Carnival, which contains a detailed list of Taiwanese queer literature (covering themes of gay, lesbian, transgender, and other sexuality and gender identities).

In 1997, the short story "Brokeback Mountain" written by Annie Proulx was published. It would later be adapted into a critically acclaimed Academy Award nominated film in 2005.

The founding of the Lambda Literary Award in 1988 helped increase the visibility of LGBT literature.

=== 21st century ===
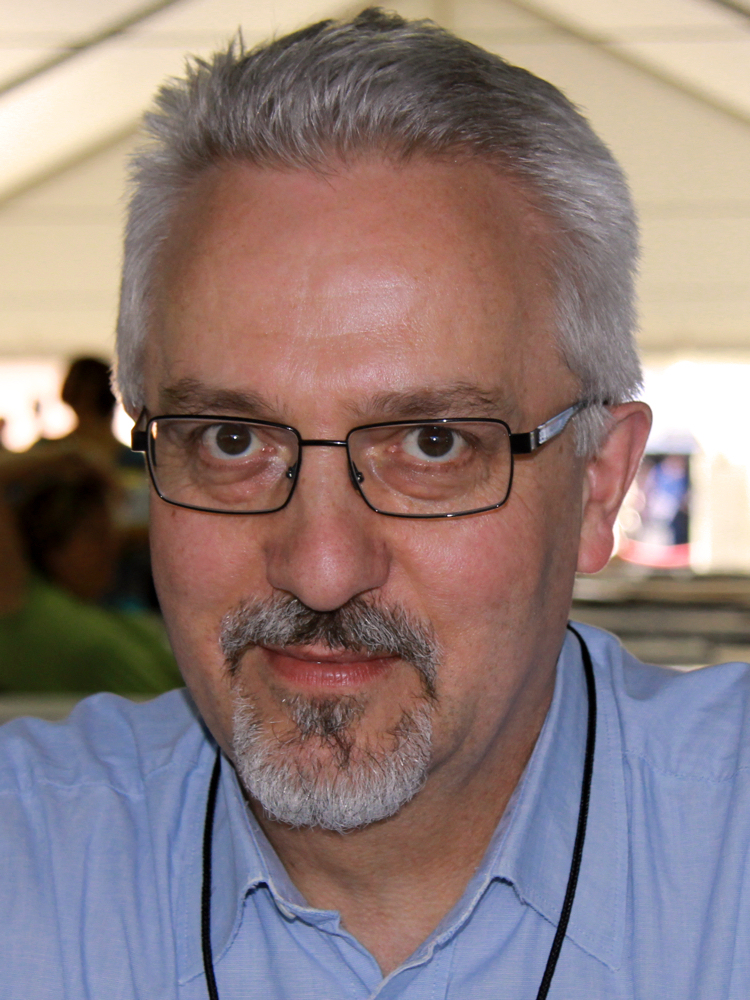
Alan Hollinghurst won the 2004 Man Booker Prize for his novel The Line of Beauty.

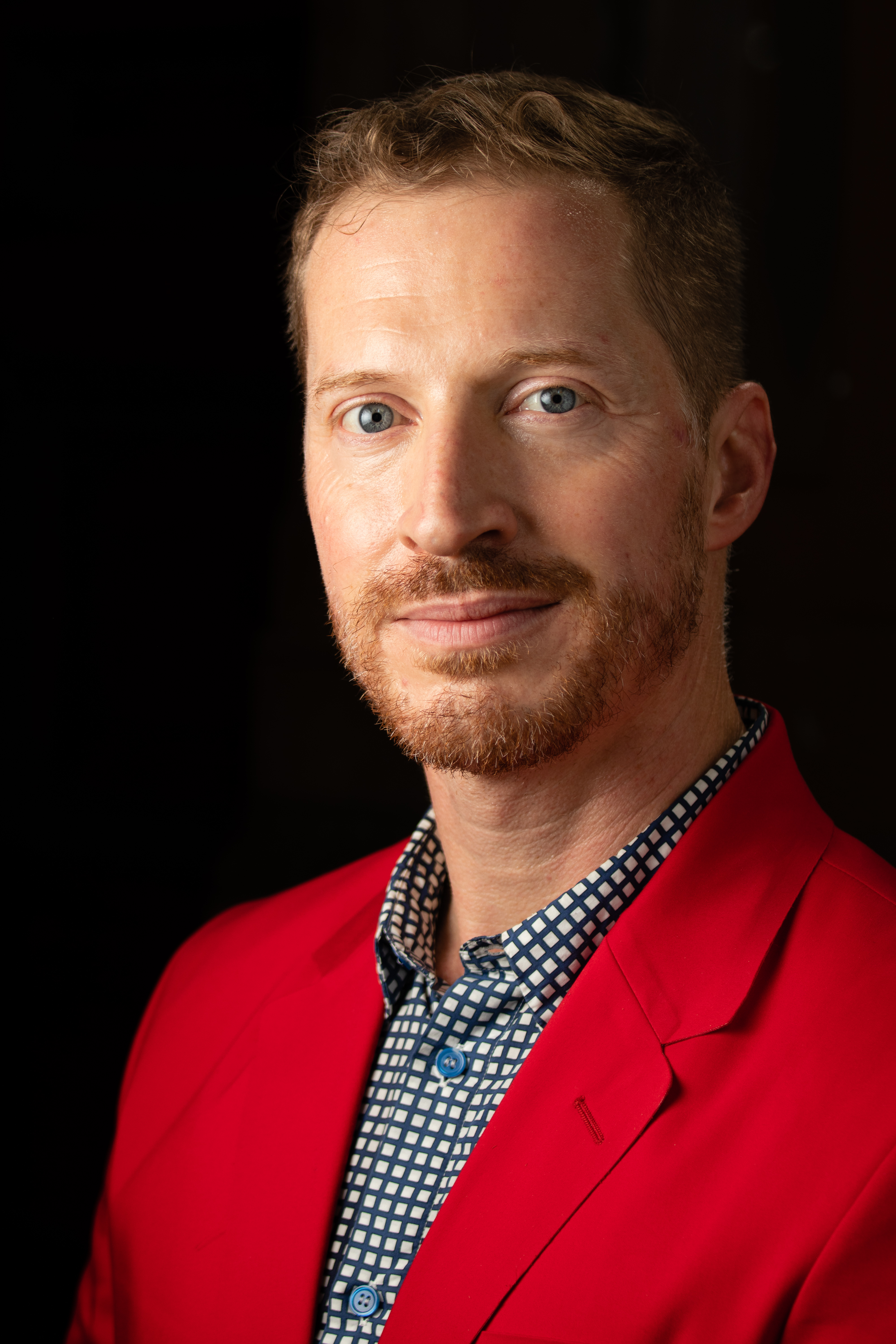
Andrew Sean Greer won the 2018 Pulitzer Prize for Fiction for his novel Less.

In the 21st century, much of LGBT literature has achieved a high level of sophistication and a number of works have earned mainstream acclaim. Notable authors include Alan Hollinghurst, Michael Cunningham, Colm Tóibín, John Boyne, and Andrew Sean Greer. Hollinghurst won the 2004 Man Booker Prize of The Line of Beauty, and Greer won the 2018 Pulitzer Prize for Fiction for Less.

LGBT themes have also become more visible in a growing body of high-quality young adult literature, with notable authors including Alex Sánchez, Shyam Selvadurai, Perry Moore, Adam Silvera, and David Levithan. Becky Albertalli's teen novel Simon vs. the Homo Sapiens Agenda was adapted into the feature film Love, Simon by 20th Century Fox, the first film by a major studio focused on a gay teenage romance. A film adaptation of Casey McQuiston's young adult LGBTQ novel Red, White & Royal Blue was released on Amazon Prime Video on August 11, 2023.

== Gay pulp ==
Gay pulp fiction or gay pulps, refers to printed works, primarily fiction, that include references to male homosexuality, specifically male gay sex, and that are cheaply produced, typically in paperback books made of wood pulp paper; lesbian pulp fiction is similar work about women. Michael Bronski, the editor of an anthology of gay pulp writing, notes in his introduction, "Gay pulp is not an exact term, and it is used somewhat loosely to refer to a variety of books that had very different origins and markets" People often use the term to refer to the "classic" gay pulps that were produced before about 1970, but it may also be used to refer to the gay erotica or pornography in paperback book or digest magazine form produced since that date.

== Speculative fiction ==
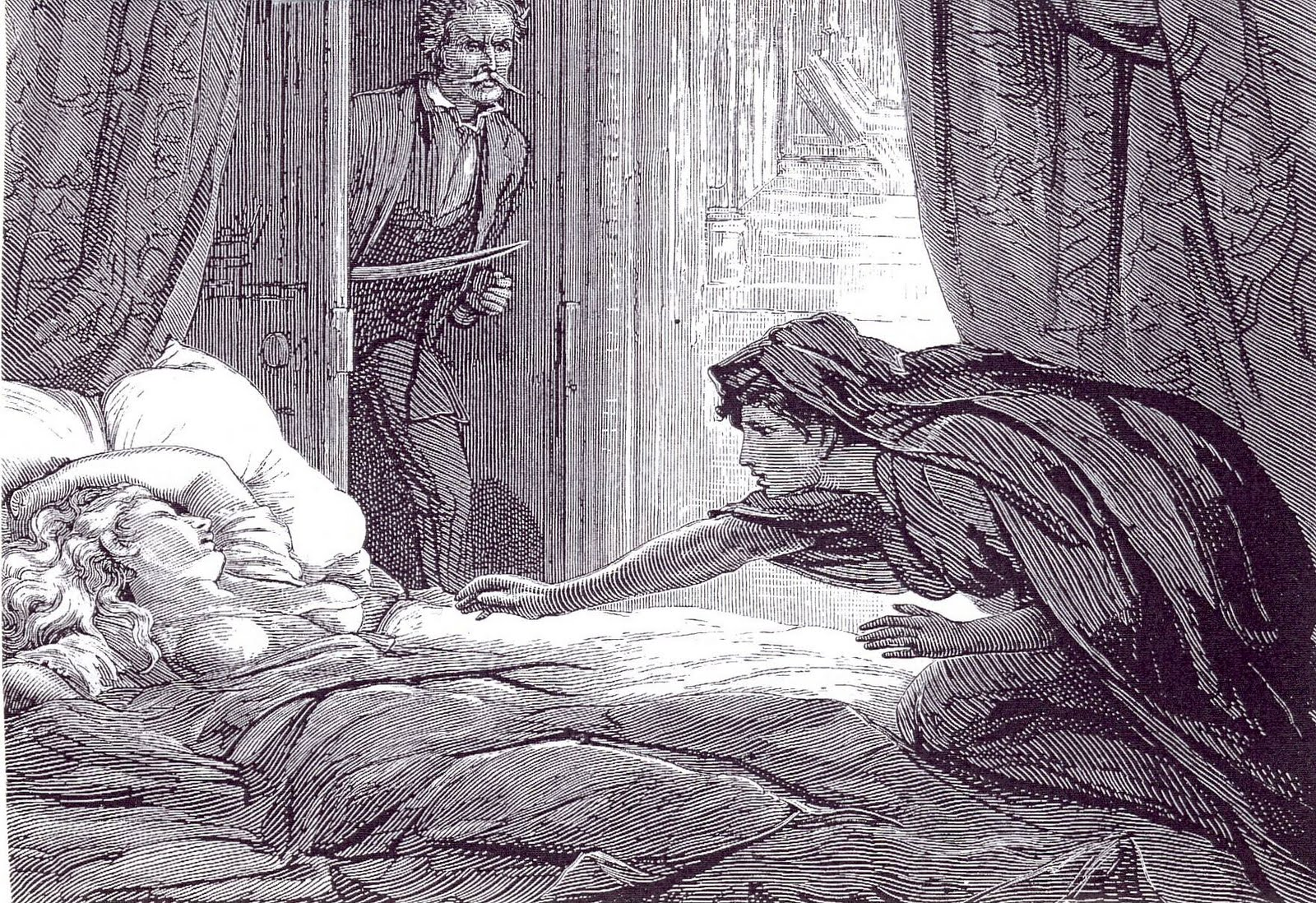
Illustration by D. H. Friston from the first publication of the lesbian vampire novella Carmilla (1872) by Sheridan Le Fanu

Homosexuality in speculative fiction refers to the incorporation of homosexual themes into science fiction, fantasy, horror fiction and related genres which together constitute speculative fiction. Such elements may include a lesbian, gay, bisexual or transgender (LGBTQ) character as the protagonist or a major character, or exploration of varieties of sexual experience that deviate from the conventional.

Science fiction and fantasy have traditionally been puritanical genres aimed at a male readership, and can be more restricted than non-genre literature by their conventions of characterisation and the effect that these conventions have on depictions of sexuality and gender. During the pulp magazine era (1920s-1930s), explicit sexuality of any kind was rare in genre science fiction and fantasy. Then, according to Joanna Russ, in the more relaxed Golden Age of Science Fiction (1940s-1950s) the genre "resolutely ignored the whole subject" of homosexuality. Some writers were able to introduce more explicit sexuality into their work as the readership for science fiction and fantasy began to age in the 1950s; however until the late 1960s few depicted alternative sexuality or revised gender roles, or openly investigated sexual questions. After the pushing back of boundaries in the 1960s and 1970s, homosexuality gained much wider acceptance, and was often incorporated into otherwise conventional SF stories with little comment. By the 1980s, blatant homophobia was no longer considered acceptable to most readers. In Lois McMaster Bujold's Ethan of Athos (1986), the titular "unlikely hero" is gay obstetrician Dr. Ethan Urquhart, whose dangerous adventure alongside the first woman he has ever met presents both a future society where homosexuality is the norm and the lingering sexism and homophobia of our own world. Uranian Worlds, by Eric Garber and Lyn Paleo, was compiled in 1983 and is an authoritative guide to science fiction literature featuring gay, lesbian, transgender, and related themes. The book covers science fiction literature published before 1990 (2nd edition, 1990), providing a short review and commentary on each piece.

As speculative fiction gives authors and readers the freedom to imagine societies that are different from real-life cultures, this freedom makes speculative fiction a useful means of examining sexual bias by forcing the reader to reconsider his or her heteronormative cultural assumptions. It has also been claimed that LGBT readers identify strongly with the mutants, aliens and other outsider characters found in speculative fiction.

James Jenkins of Valancourt Books notes that the connection between gay fiction and horror goes back to the Gothic novels of the 1790s and early 1800s. A number of Gothic authors, like Matthew Lewis, William Thomas Beckford and Francis Lathom, were homosexual, and according to Jenkins "the traditional explanation for the gay/horror connection is that it was impossible for them to write openly about gay themes back then (or even perhaps express them, since words like 'gay' and 'homosexual' didn't exist), so they sublimated them and expressed them in more acceptable forms, using the medium of a transgressive genre like horror fiction." Early works with clear gay subtext include Lewis's The Monk (1796) and both Charles Maturin's The Fatal Revenge (1807) and Melmoth the Wanderer (1820). Somewhat later came the first lesbian vampire novella Carmilla (1872) by Sheridan Le Fanu and The Picture of Dorian Gray (1890) by Oscar Wilde, which shocked readers with its sensuality and overtly homosexual characters. There is even gay subtext in Bram Stoker's Dracula (1897) as the title character warns off the female vampires and claims Jonathan Harker, saying "This man belongs to me!" The erotic metaphor of vampirism, inspired by Carmilla, has resulted in a number of vampire films since the 1970s strongly implying or explicitly portraying lesbianism.

James R. Keller writes that in particular, "Gay and lesbian readers have been quick to identify with the representation of the vampire, suggesting its experiences parallel those of the sexual outsider." Richard Dyer discusses the recurring homoerotic motifs of vampire fiction in his article "Children of the Night", primarily "the necessity of secrecy, the persistence of a forbidden passion, and the fear of discovery." With the vampire having been a recurring metaphor for same-sex desire from before Stoker's Dracula, Dyer observes that historically earlier representations of vampires tend to evoke horror and later ones turn that horror into celebration. The homoerotic overtones of Anne Rice's celebrated The Vampire Chronicles series (1976–present) are well documented, and its publication reinforced the "widely recognized parallel between the queer and the vampire."

== Comics ==
LGBT themes in comics is a relatively new concept, as lesbian, gay, bisexual and transgender (LGBTQ) themes and characters were historically omitted intentionally from the content of comic books and their comic strip predecessors, due to either censorship or the perception that comics were for children. With any mention of homosexuality in mainstream United States comics forbidden by the Comics Code Authority (CCA) until 1989, earlier attempts at exploring these issues in the US took the form of subtle hints or subtext regarding a character's sexual orientation. LGBT themes were tackled earlier in underground comics from the early 1970s onward. Independently published one-off comic books and series, often produced by gay creators and featuring autobiographical storylines, tackled political issues of interest to LGBT readers.

Comic strips have also dealt in subtext and innuendo, their wide distribution in newspapers limiting their inclusion of controversial material. The first openly gay characters appeared in prominent strips in the late 1970s; representation of LGBT issues in these titles causes vociferous reaction, both praise and condemnation, to the present day. Comic strips aimed at LGBT audiences are also syndicated in gay- and lesbian-targeted magazines and comics have been created to educate people about LGBT-related issues and to influence real-world politics, with their format and distribution allowing them to transmit messages more subtle, complex, and positive than typical educational material. Portrayal of LGBT themes in comics is recognized by several notable awards, including the Gaylactic Spectrum Award and GLAAD Media Awards for outstanding comic book and comic strip.

Since the 1990s, LGBT themes have become more common in mainstream US comics, including in a number of titles in which a gay character is the star. European comics have been more inclusive from an earlier date. The lack of censorship, and greater acceptance of comics as a medium of adult entertainment led to less controversy about the representation of LGBT characters. The popular Japanese manga tradition has included genres of girls' comics that feature homosexual relationships since the 1970s, in the form of yaoi and yuri. These works are often extremely romantic and include archetypal characters that often are not identified as gay. Manga specifically targeting an LGBTQ audience, with more realistic and autobiographical themes, has been produced since the Japanese "gay boom" of the 1990s. Pornographic manga also often includes sexualised depictions of lesbians and intersex people. Queer theorists have noted that LGBT characters in mainstream comic books are usually shown as assimilated into heterosexual society, whereas in alternative comics the diversity and uniqueness of LGBT culture is emphasized.

== Children's fiction ==
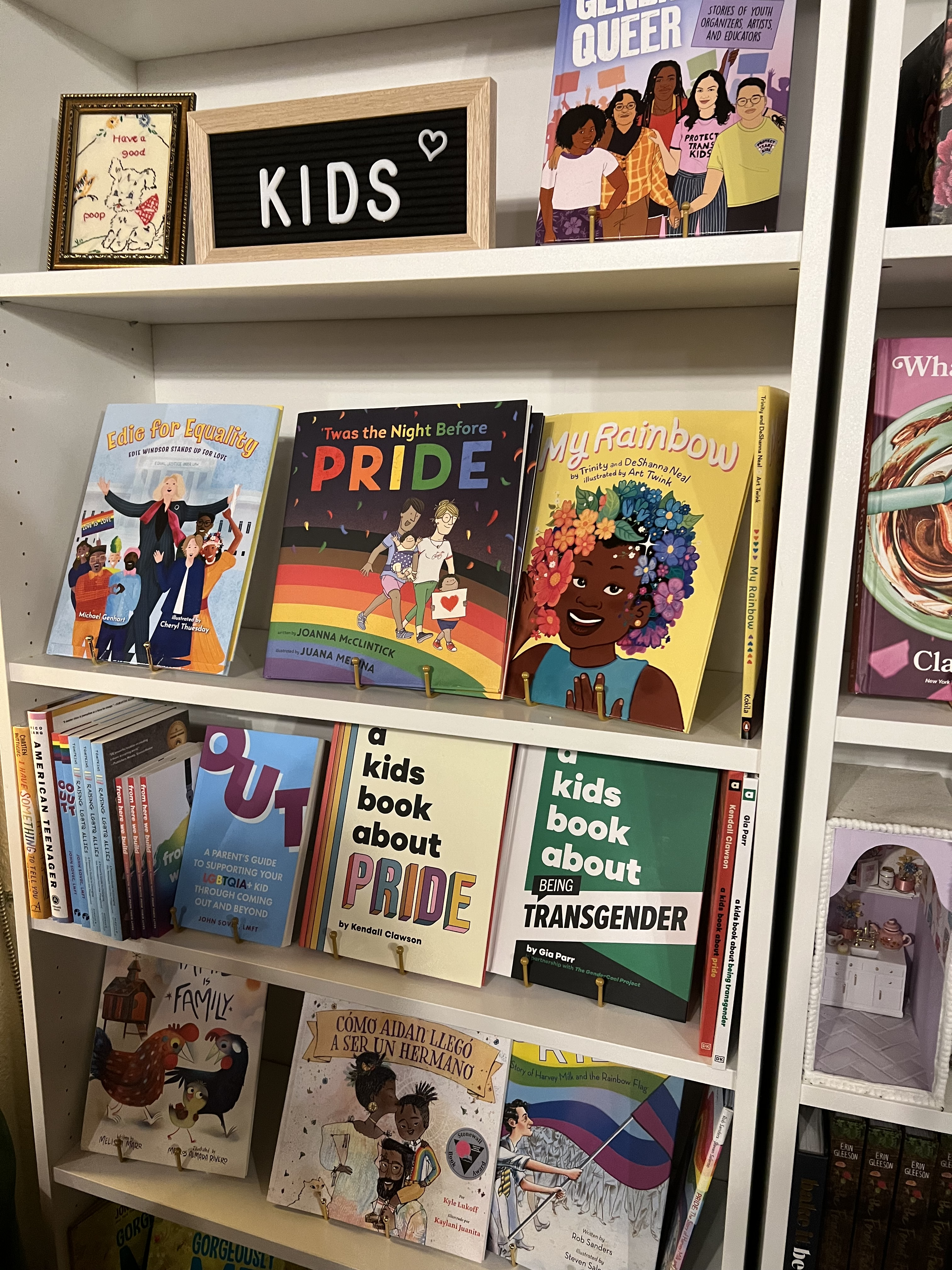
Bookshelf of Gay Children's Literature

=== Gay themes ===
Compared to gay and lesbian teen fiction, sales of gay-themed books for younger children, and availability of these books in public and school libraries, remain "very dicey and very different".

When Megan Went Away (1979) was the first picture book to include LGBT characters. The story, written by Jane Severance and illustrated by Tea Schook, concerns a preteen girl whose lesbian mother and her partner have separated. The first children's book with gay male characters was Jenny Lives with Eric and Martin. Originally published in 1981 in Danish as Mette bor hos Morten og Erik, it tells the story of Jenny, her father and his partner and their daily life. Controversy and politicization followed its publication.

Some of the best known children's books with gay themes include Heather Has Two Mommies (1989) and Daddy's Roommate (1991), published by LGBTQ publisher Alyson Books. Both books discussed same-sex parenting and attracted criticism and controversy. The American Library Association ranked Heather Has Two Mommies as the third and second most frequently challenged book in the United States in 1993 and 1994, respectively.

Recent controversies include King & King, originally written in Dutch and published in English in 2002. The book is about a prince uninterested in princesses, who eventually falls in love with another prince. In 2006, parents sued a Massachusetts school district after a teacher read the book to their son's second grade class. And Tango Makes Three (2005) by Justin Richardson and Peter Parnell has been frequently challenged, and is often on the American Library Associations's List of Challenged Books for Banned Books Week. It was ranked ninth on this list in 2017. The book tells the true story of two male penguins who adopt an egg and raise the baby once it has hatched. While it has been banned and debated multiple times, it has been awarded and noted by the American Library Association on their Rainbow Book List.

In 2018, Little Bee Books partnered with media advocacy group GLAAD for a series of books that offered positive LGBT representation in children's literature. The partnership kicked off with Prince & Knight, written by Daniel Haack and illustrated by Stevie Lewis, which was named to the American Library Association's Rainbow Book List and was named a best book of the year by Kirkus Reviews, Amazon and the Chicago Tribune. The partnership has gone on to include books that also offer lesbian, transgender and gender non-conforming representation.

Australian titles include the books in the 'Learn to Include' series: The Rainbow Cubby House, My House, Going to Fair Day and Koalas on Parade. House of Hades (2013), Book 4 in the young adult series The Heroes of Olympus by Rick Riordan, features a gay supporting character, Nico di Angelo.

A more extensive list of gay children's literature includes:

- A Name on the Quilt: A Story of Remembrance by Jeannine Atkins
- Uncle Bobby's Wedding by Sarah S. Brannen
- A B C: A Family Alphabet Book by Bobby Combs
- 1 2 3: A Family Counting Book by Bobby Combs
- Oliver Button is a Sissy by Tomie dePaola
- Asha's Mums by Rosamund Elwin and Michele Paulse
- The Sissy Duckling by Harvey Fierstein
- Molly's Family by Nancy Garden
- Antonio's Card/La Targeta de Antonio by Rigoberto González
- Best Best Colors: Los Mejores Colo res by Eric Hoffman
- Mini Mia and Her Darling Uncle by Pija Lindenbaum
- Everywhere Babies by Susan Meyers
- Felicia's Favorite Story by Lesléa Newman
- Mommy, Mama, and Me by Lesléa Newman
- Saturday is Pattyday by Lesléa Newman
- Too Far Away to Touch by Lesléa Newman
- The White Swan Express by Jean Davies Okimoto and Elaine M. Aoki
- It's Okay to Be Different by Todd Parr
- Tiger Flowers by Patricia Quinlan
- And Tango Makes Three by Justin Richardson
- Seeds by George Shannon
- My Two Uncles by Judith Vigna
- William's Doll by Charlotte Zolotow
- "My Shadow Is Purple" by Scott Stuart
- "My Shadow Is Pink" by Scott Stuart

In July 2014, Singapore's National Library Board (NLB), a state-funded network of 26 public libraries, confirmed it would destroy three children's books with pro-LGBT families themes for being "against its 'pro-family' stance[,] following complaints by a parent and its own internal review". The decision was widely criticized by LGBT supporters and the arts and literary community who see the actions as akin to book burnings and other forms of censorship. The three books are And Tango Makes Three, which covers the true story of a pair of male penguins that successfully raise a chick, The White Swan Express, which features children adopted by a variety of families including gay, mixed-race and single parents, and Who's in My Family, which references families with homosexual parents. Two weeks after a gay rights rally, these books "sparked a fierce debate" between the religious conservatives, who opposed the rally, and Singapore's growing gay rights lobby.

=== Bisexual themes ===
As of 2020, there have been no explicitly bisexual characters—either children or adults—in children's picture book fiction. While a number of nonfiction picture book biographies of historical figures who had relationships with people of the same gender overlook or ignore those relationships, at least one, Frida Kahlo for Girls and Boys by Nadia Fink (2017), mentions that Kahlo loved both men and women. Some young adult fiction books do feature bisexual characters, including Empress of the World by Sara Ryan (2001), Double Feature: Attack of the Soul-Sucking Brain Zombies/Bride of the Soul-Sucking Brain Zombies by Brent Hartinger (2007), Pink by Lili Wilkinson (2009), and It's Our Prom (So Deal with It) by Julie Anne Peters (2012). When they do appear in young adult fiction, bisexuals are often portrayed as confused or greedy.

== Awards ==
- Dayne Ogilvie Prize
- Ferro-Grumley Award
- Lambda Literary Award
- Stonewall Book Award

== See also ==
- Gay characters in fiction
- Gay romance
- Bengali Queer Literature
- Singapore gay literature
- Lesbian literature
- List of lesbian fiction
- List of poets portraying sexual relations between women
- Transgender literature
- List of LGBT writers
- Lost Gay Novels
