= Left to Themselves =

1891 book

Left to Themselves: Being the Ordeal of Philip and Gerald
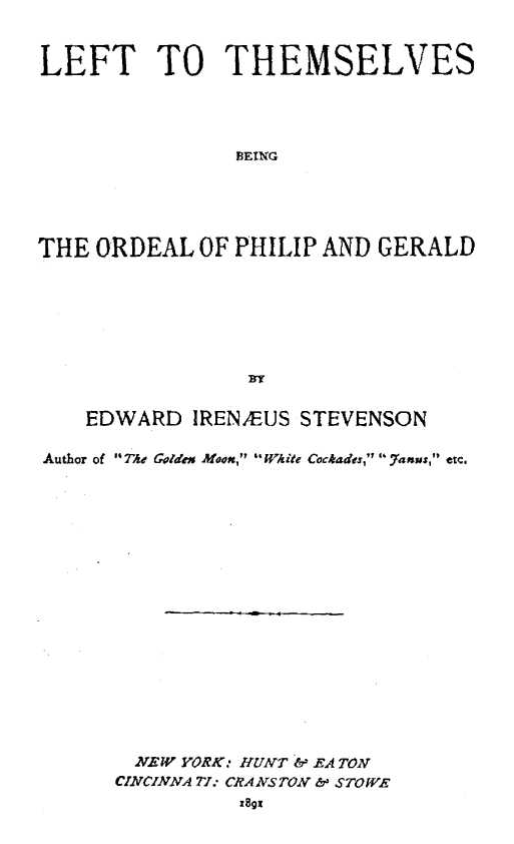
- Title page for Left to Themselves: Being the Ordeal of Philip and Gerald (1891)
- Author: Edward Irenaeus Prime-Stevenson
- Language: English
- Publisher: Hunt & Eaton
- Publication date: 1891

Left to Themselves: Being the Ordeal of Philip and Gerald is a novel by Edward Prime-Stevenson. It was first published by Hunt & Eaton in 1891.
