= A Room in Chelsea Square =

1958 book by Michael Nelson

- 1959 US Anchor Books cover, illustrated by Edward Gorey
- Author: Michael Nelson
- Language: English
- Genre: Gay literature
- Published: 1958
- Publication place: United Kingdom
- Media type: Print (hardcover & paperback)

A Room in Chelsea Square is a 1958 British gay novel by Michael Nelson, originally published anonymously due to its homosexual content and "thinly veiled portrayals of prominent London literary figures." It is about a wealthy gentleman who lures an attractive younger man to London with the promise of an upper crust lifestyle.

== Publishing ==
A "camp" novel about "bitchy queens in 1950s London", A Room in Chelsea Square is semi-autobiographical. It was published anonymously because of its explicit gay content at a time when homosexuality was still illegal, and since its characters were thinly disguised portraits of prominent literary figures in London. The character 'Patrick' is based on arts philanthropist Peter Watson; 'Ronnie' is based on Cyril Connolly, editor of the literary magazine Horizon; and 'Christopher' is based on the poet Stephen Spender. The cover of the 1959 US Anchor Books edition was illustrated by Edward Gorey, who was then on staff at Doubleday. Sphere Books republished A Room in Chelsea Square in 1969, and it was reprinted again in 1986 by the now-defunct Gay Men's Press in their Gay Modern Classics series. The 2013 Valancourt Books edition features a new introduction by Gregory Woods.

== Plot summary ==
Wealthy middle-aged gentleman Patrick lures handsome provincial journalist Nicholas to London with the promise of a job, and puts the younger man up at his hotel suite. Nicholas soon becomes accustomed to Patrick's gifts, luxurious lifestyle and interesting friends, but realizing that Patrick is interested in more than friendship, Nicholas finds that he will have to either give in, or give up everything Patrick can provide.

== Critical reception ==
A Room in Chelsea Square received several positive reviews at its initial publication. Malcolm Bradbury called the novel "sharp, witty, malicious ... wonderfully developed in the best Machiavellian tradition" in The New York Times Book Review. Julian MacLaren-Ross wrote in Punch that the author's style "is swift and straightforward, his narrative gift considerable ... Consistently diverting, this may be the novel about homosexuality to end all novels on the subject", adding that the novel would "make many a reader’s day". John Betjeman was equally complimentary in The Daily Telegraph, writing that "the story is told with sustained suspense: the various men in it are not merely types, but flesh and blood, even if one wishes that Patrick had never been born." Books and Bookmen declared the novel "classic high camp", and The Sunday Times called it "odiously funny and delightfully unwholesome ... a distinct relief after the ponderous treatment homosexuality has tended to get in some recent novels."

In his introduction for the 2013 edition, Woods notes that the novel gets opposing responses: to some, it is "a camp tour de force”, and to others, "especially in the decade or so after its publication, it is a parade of negative representations of homosexual men." He argues that, though the novel's characters are not sympathetic and it makes no effort to promote tolerance or law reform:

Its main virtue is that it takes homosexuality completely for granted. There is anguish aplenty, but not about being gay. Most is about being unloved or unmoneyed. Perhaps that is the point: there are more important things to worry about—a poorly cooked meal, an ill-chosen tie—than the trivial matter of being queer.

James Jenkins of Valancourt said in 2014 that the novel "elicits some really strong reactions from today's readers—people either think the novel is hilarious fun, or else they view the main character, Patrick, as a reprehensible predator. I think it's great that a gay novel from 1958 can still inspire such interest and passionate responses."
