= Imre: A Memorandum =

1906 novel by Edward Prime-Stevenson

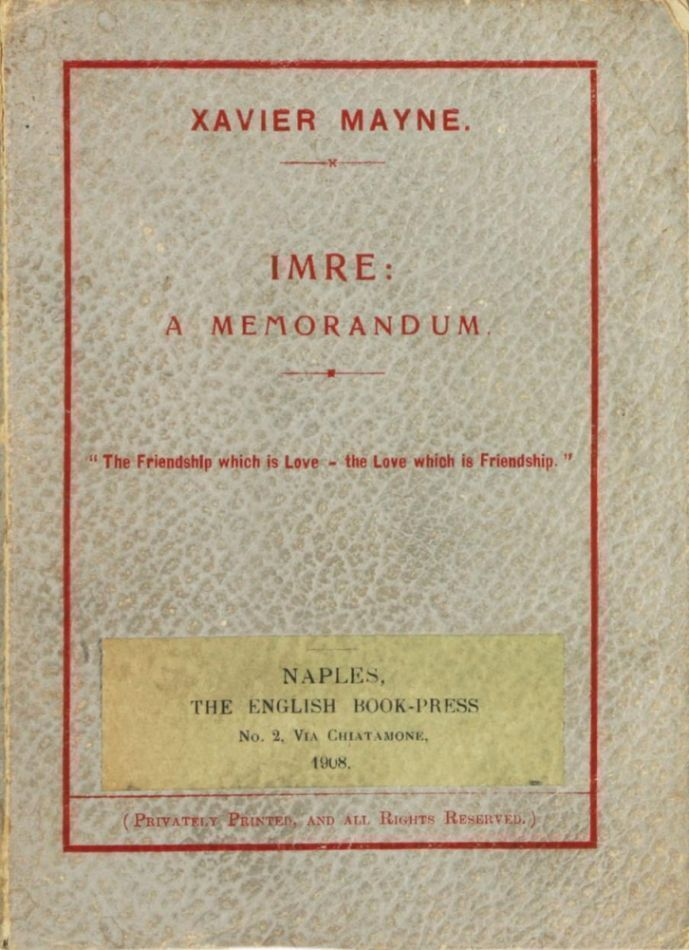
- Title page of first edition
- Author: Edward Prime-Stevenson
- Language: English
- Genre: Gay novel
- Publication date: 1906
- Publication place: United States
- Text: Imre: A Memorandum at Wikisource

Imre: A Memorandum is a 1906 novel by the expatriate American-born author Edward Prime-Stevenson about the homosexual relationship between two men. Written in Europe, it was originally published under the pseudonym "Xavier Mayne" in a limited-edition imprint of 500 copies in Naples, Italy.

== Plot introduction ==
Described by the author as "a little psychological romance", the narrative follows two men who by chance meet at a cafe in Budapest, Hungary. Both Oswald, a 30-something British aristocrat, and Imre, a 25-year-old Hungarian military officer, are "insistently masculine types tempered by a love of art". Over the course of several months they forge a friendship that leads to a series of cautious revelations and disclosures, and ultimately love.

== Literary significance and criticism ==
Although Imre: A Memorandum is not the first American gay novel (Bayard Taylor's 1870 work Joseph and His Friend: A Story of Pennsylvania precedes it), its ending is "unprecedented" in that the homosexual couple is happy and united when the novel concludes.

James J. Gifford called Imre a "cerebral but fascinating novel that owes a great deal to the style of Henry James." Joseph Cady praised the novel as "the frankest and most affirmative gay male American work in the century's first decade," noting that it "reflects an interest in gay history as well—the two men have a long conversation about great earlier homosexuals."

The novel was republished on January 1, 2003, by Broadview Press (ISBN 1551113589), in a new edition, which includes a discussion of the life of Edward Prime-Stevenson, about whom little is known, as well as extensive annotations by the editor, James J. Gifford.

== See also ==
- Gay literature
