= Michael Nelson (novelist) =

British novelist

- Michael Nelson c.1950
- Born: 1921
- Died: 1990 (aged 68–69)
- Occupation: Novelist
- Spouse: George Tsambikas
- Writing career
- Pen name: Henry Stratton
- Language: English
- Genres: Fiction; Gay literature
- Notable work: A Room in Chelsea Square

Michael Harrington Nelson (1921–1990) was a British novelist best known for his 1958 gay novel A Room in Chelsea Square, originally published anonymously.

== Early and personal life ==
Born in 1921, Nelson was a journalist before the Second World War. He was a secretary to publisher John Lehmann during the war, and served as a captain in the Royal Army Service Corps. Nelson later owned a bookstore in Winchester where he lived with his then boyfriend. Nelson married Rachel Holland, who knew he was gay, and they remained married the rest of their lives. Nelson died in 1990.

== Writing ==
Nelson's first novel Knock or Ring (1957), which drew from his own experiences, was about a "ring" of booksellers who conspired to fix auctions. It received good reviews, but was never reprinted until its 2013 Valancourt Books edition.

His second book, A Room in Chelsea Square (1958), was published anonymously owing to its explicit homosexual content. It is about a wealthy gentleman who lures an attractive younger man to London with the promise of an upper-crust lifestyle, and has been called a "gay classic". It has been reprinted several times. The 2013 Valancourt edition features a new introduction by Gregory Woods.

Nelson's other books are Blanket (1959) (published under the pseudonym "Henry Stratton"), When the Bed Broke (1961), Captain Blossom (1973), Captain Blossom Soldiers On (1974), Nobs & Snobs (1976), Captain Blossom in Civvy Street (1978), and Fear No More (1989).
