= Gregory Woods =

British poet (born 1953)

- Born: 1953 (age 72–73); Egypt
- Education: The Oratory School
- Alma mater: University of East Anglia
- Occupations: Academic, poet
- Relatives: Justin Webb

Gregory Woods (born 1953 in Egypt) is a British poet. He was the Chair in Gay and Lesbian Studies at Nottingham Trent University from 1998 to 2013. He is the author of five books of literary and LGBT studies criticism, and seven poetry collections.

== Early life and family ==
Gregory Woods was born in 1953 in Cairo, Egypt. He grew up in Ghana. He was educated at The Oratory School and the University of East Anglia (BA English and American Literature, 1974; MA Modern Literature, 1975; PhD, 1983; DLitt, 2005). He is the cousin of BBC Radio 4 Today programme presenter Justin Webb; Woods's mother, Charmion, was the elder sister of Webb's mother, Gloria (there is no relationship, however, between Webb's father, Peter Woods, and Gregory Woods, despite the shared name).

== Career ==
Woods began his teaching career at the University of Salerno (1980–1984). From 1990 to 2013 he worked at Nottingham Trent University, where, in 1998, he was appointed to a Chair in Gay and Lesbian Studies, the first such appointment in the United Kingdom. On retirement, he was duly appointed Emeritus Professor of Gay and Lesbian Studies. Woods's main areas of interest include twentieth-century gay and lesbian literature; post-war gay and lesbian film and cultural studies; and the AIDS epidemic. In addition to his poetry collections, he is the author of a number of critical books, including Articulate Flesh: Male Homo-eroticism and Modern Poetry (1987), A History of Gay Literature: The Male Tradition (1998), and Homintern: How Gay Culture Liberated the Modern World (2016), all from Yale University Press. He has been a member of the board of directors of East Midlands Arts, an artistic assessor for Arts Council England, a Fellow of the Royal Society of Arts, and a Fellow of the English Association. He has been awarded two Hawthornden Fellowships (1999, 2008).

Woods writes poetry in free verse, syllabics and regular metre. Thom Gunn wrote of the poems in his first collection: 'I admired them especially for their technical virtuosity, in that it was technique completely used, never for the sake of cleverness but as a component of feeling... taken together, they constitute a handbook of desire; separately, each is an exquisite insight, rapid and rich. The predominant tone is of a kind of delighted astonishment that mere sensuality can be so meaningful.' Woods' subject matter is by no means limited to gay themes and his work is characterised by classical and literary allusions, a dry scepticism and waspish humour. In the Times Literary Supplement (16 October 1992), Neil Powell wrote, 'The overwhelming impression of We Have the Melon remains that of frankly sexual joyousness matched by serious literary intelligence, a rare combination and a reassuring one.'

Also in the Times Literary Supplement (9 December 2016), Paul Batchelor wrote: 'A poet of tremendous facility and feeling, Gregory Woods has a way of making the formal challenges he sets himself look easy.' In London Grip (January 2017), John Lucas wrote: 'The late, great Peter Porter once observed that Gregory Woods was probably the most accomplished of contemporary formalist poets, which, if you pause to think where such praise comes from, is not merely a copper-bottomed endorsement but outstandingly generous. And yet it’s no more than Woods deserves. Look on his work, ye formalists, and despair ... [H]is work invites comparison with the best of Robert Graves ... I can't think of any poet who so adroitly manages what is often tricky, even recalcitrant, material.'

Among many literary-critical publications, Woods has contributed to The Oxford Companion to English Literature (2000), The Cambridge History of the English Novel (2012), The Cambridge Companion to the City in Literature (2014), and The Routledge Companion to Travel Writing (2016). Woods wrote the foreword to the 1995 Basic Books edition of I, Pierre Seel, Deported Homosexual by Pierre Seel, and the introductions to the Valancourt Books editions of The Harness Room by L.P. Hartley, Look Down in Mercy by Walter Baxter, The Man on the Rock and To the Dark Tower by Francis King, The Feathers of Death by Simon Raven, and A Room in Chelsea Square by Michael Nelson. He has written book reviews for Body and Society; Changing English; Chroma; City Life; Environment and Planning: Society and Space; European Gay Review; Feminist Theory; Frontiers; Gay & Lesbian Review; Gay News; Gay’s the Word Review; Gay Times; Gender, Place and Culture; The Independent; James White Review; Lesbian and Gay Socialist; Literary London; London Review of Books; New Statesman; New Statesman and Society; New Walk; Over Here; PerVersions; Pink Paper; PN Review; Renaissance Quarterly; Rouge; The Spokesman; Studies in Travel Writing; Textual Practice; Times Higher Education Supplement; Times Literary Supplement; and Word and Image.

He has discussed aspects of LGBT culture on Kaleidoscope, the Today programme, and Front Row (BBC Radio 4); Night Waves, The Essay and Sunday Feature (BBC Radio 3); as well as during various programmes on BBC Radio 5 Live, BBC Radio Scotland, BBC Radio Ulster, and other regional radio stations.

Woods's essay collection The Myth of the Last Taboo (2016) includes essays on mourning in gay culture, catalogue-shopping, desert-island narratives, lesbian and gay holiday brochures, cartoons about AIDS in the French gay press, British gay TV programmes in the 1980s and 1990s, music in gay films, Italian camp, AIDS movies, the Beirut hostage memoirs, and the common journalistic cliché of the last taboo.

== Prose ==
- Articulate Flesh: Male Homo-eroticism and Modern Poetry (London & New Haven: Yale University Press, 1987);
- This Is No Book: A Gay Reader (Nottingham: Mushroom Books, 1994);
- A History of Gay Literature: The Male Tradition (London & New Haven: Yale University Press, 1998);
- Homintern: How Gay Culture Liberated the Modern World (London & New Haven: Yale University Press, 2016);
- The Myth of the Last Taboo: Queer Subcultural Studies (Nottingham: Trent Editions, 2016).

== Poetry ==
- We Have the Melon (Manchester: Carcanet, 1992);
- May I Say Nothing (Manchester: Carcanet, 1998);
- The District Commissioner's Dreams (Manchester: Carcanet, 2002);
- Quidnunc (Manchester: Carcanet, 2007);
- An Ordinary Dog (Manchester: Carcanet, 2011);
- Very Soon I Shall Know (Nottingham: Shoestring, 2012);
- Art in Heaven (Littleover, Derby: Sow's Ear, 2015);
- Records of an Incitement to Silence (Manchester: Carcanet, 2021);
- They Exchange Glances: Gay Modernist Poems in Translation (Badingham, Suffolk: Hercules Editions, 2024).
