= The Heart in Exile =

1953 novel by Rodney Garland

- 1954 US first edition cover
- Author: Rodney Garland
- Language: English
- Genre: Gay literature; Detective fiction
- Publisher: W. H. Allen & Co.
- Publication date: 1953
- Publication place: United Kingdom
- Media type: Print (hardcover)

The Heart in Exile is a 1953 British novel by Hungarian writer Adam de Hegedus under the pseudonym Rodney Garland. It chronicles homosexual life in London during World War II and post-war, via a psychiatrist's investigation into his former lover's death.

== Plot ==
Oxford-educated psychiatrist Dr. Anthony "Tony" Page's grieving new patient, Ann Hewitt, recounts the recent death of her barrister fiancé, Julian Leclerc, by an accidental overdose of sleeping pills. She suspects that there is more to the story, and Tony finds himself pursuing an investigation of Julian, who was his lover years before.

== Publication ==
The Heart in Exile was written by Hungarian writer Adam de Hegedus, but published by W. H. Allen & Co. in 1953 under the pseudonym of Rodney Garland because of its controversial themes. It was a "shock success" and ran into several British and American editions. Most recently, it was reprinted by Valancourt Books in 2014, with a new introduction by Neil Bartlett. It has been called the first gay detective novel, and the first work of fiction to tackle the theme of male homosexuality in 1950s Britain.

== Analysis ==
Contemporaneous reviews of the novel reflect the mainstream attitudes about homosexuality in the early 1950s. In 1954, Frank G. Slaughter of The New York Times wrote,

This is a strange novel, perhaps because it is about strange people, in that they differ from the rest of us who call ourselves normal ... the "queer" make up a substantial segment of the population, a million males in England, at least two million in the United States. To any doctor familiar with psychiatric problems during World War II this figure comes as no surprise. To the nonprofessional observer it will be shocking, as will many other revelations ... If more people can, through reading this study in novel form, achieve a better understanding of a difficult social and emotional problem, The Heart in Exile will have done a worth-while thing in exposing the details of what many still consider only a revolting abnormality.

== Reception ==
John Betjeman of The Daily Telegraph praised the novel as "a completely honest story of homosexual life in London ... It makes no attempt to defend or condemn. A well-written work." Slaughter called the novel a "sensitive and deeply perceptive story of the homosexual and his underworld", and wrote:

In the process of solving this fascinating whodunit, the author takes the reader into the busy underworld of the London inverts, the pubs where they meet to make contacts, the busy social life at every level (from garage mechanic to Parliament), the specters of exposure and humiliation that haunt them. The result is an amazing, many-faceted picture of a world—or rather a half world—about which the average reader knows nothing. At first these vivid, slice-of-life pictures may seem disgusting. But so effective is the author's treatment of a hush-hush subject that he manages to bring home in a remarkable manner the suffering of the homosexual, the grave emotional crises to which his abnormal and usually irresistible urges drive him. It took real courage to write this story, plus a profound insight into human feelings and sensitivities.

Marghanita Laski of The Observer called it "a sad, serious first novel", and wrote, "Its documentation is more important than its plot, and its detached picture of barren tragic love and desire in a furtive fantastic 'underground' sector of London can arouse no disgust but only a deep pity coupled with a new understanding." Explaining that Tony's investigation takes him through the "underground" homosexual community in London, Kirkus Reviews wrote that "the subtle differentiations, evasions, and often humiliations of this half-world and the special habitat it frequents is viewed with detachment but without distaste". In 2015, Christopher Fowler of The Independent described the novel as "subtly delineated, sombre, and grittily realistic". Noting that homosexual acts were still a crime in Britain in the 1950s, he wrote that some contemporaneous reviews of the novel were "unwittingly condescending". In 2022, Eric Brown of Neglected Books called the novel "searingly honest and heartbreaking".
