= Adam de Hegedus =

Hungarian writer (1906–1955)

- Born: Adam Martin de Hegedus; December 14, 1906; Budapest, Hungary
- Died: October 1955 (aged 48–49); Marble Arch, London
- Occupation: Writer
- Writing career
- Pen name: Rodney Garland
- Language: English
- Genres: Gay literature; Autobiography
- Notable work: The Heart in Exile

Adam de Hegedus (14 December 1906–October 1955) was a Hungarian-British writer best known for his novels published under the pseudonym Rodney Garland.

== Early life ==
Adam Martin de Hegedus was born in Budapest on 14 December 1906. His father was an official at the Hungarian treasury, who rose to a high position and retired with a title of peerage. In June 1927, at age 21, De Hegedus traveled to Britain to learn English for the Hungarian diplomatic service, and to read up on international law at the British Museum Library for his doctoral thesis. He lived in a South Kensington boarding house, and explored London. De Hegedus returned to Hungary in December 1927 to complete his university final examinations, intending to abandon a diplomatic career and become a writer in England. He wrote in his biographical work Don't Keep the Vanman Waiting (1944), "It was England's mental climate that had proved so all absorbing, so conquering, all powerful, compelling, that it made me feel at home at once". De Hegedus, a Doctor of Law who could speak four languages, acquired British citizenship in the 1930s.

== Career ==
Throughout the 1930s, de Hegedus was based in London, working as the London correspondent for several Hungarian newspapers and writing for British periodicals including Esquire, The Observer, the Evening Standard and the London Mercury. In 1934, his short story "The Golden Cock" was published in Lovat Dickson's Magazine. De Hegedus's first book, the non-fiction work Hungarian Background, was published in 1937. In late 1937, Britain broke off diplomatic relations with Hungary when that country allied itself with Germany. No longer able to send his daily cables to Budapest, de Hegedus lost his main source of income and decided "the best thing I could do was to volunteer for one of the Forces." In October 1941, he was sent to train as a gunner near Wakefield in West Yorkshire.

In Don't Keep the Vanman Waiting: A Chapter of Autobiography (Nicholson & Watson, 1944), de Hegedus reflected on his early life and chronicled his experiences in the army. De Hegedus applied for a commission during his time as a gunner, and was refused. His request for a transfer to the Army Education Corps as a lecturer was also later rejected. Eric Brown noted, "Following a bout of insomnia and depression, de Hegedus suffered a nervous breakdown and was referred to a military hospital in Leeds. After a period of recuperation, he was discharged from the Army in 1942. His later attempts to find work to aid the war effort were stonewalled for the same reason he was refused a commission and turned down as an Army lecturer: as his parents were enemy nationals, de Hegedus was considered a security risk." He next worked as a van driver, "delivering film posters to cinemas in London and the suburbs", and writing on the side.

De Hegedus's first novel, Rehearsal Under the Moon, had been completed in 1940 but was published in 1946. This was followed by four non-fiction works: The State of the World (1946), Patriotism or Peace? (Charles Scribner's Sons, 1947), Strangers Here Ourselves (1949), and Home and Away: Notes on England after the Second World War (Hutchinson & Co., 1951).

Christopher Fowler of The Independent suggested that "the only book for which de Hegedus is remembered" is his 1953 gay-themed novel The Heart in Exile. The story of a psychiatrist who investigates the death of his male ex-lover, it has been called the first gay detective novel, and the first work of fiction to tackle the theme of male homosexuality in 1950s Britain. Fowler wrote of de Hegedus, "A melancholy, private man, it's hard to say what made him take the extraordinary step of writing a gay novel, 14 years before homosexuality was decriminalised in Britain."

De Hegedus followed The Heart in Exile with the gay-themed espionage thriller, The Troubled Midnight, published by Coward-McCann under the Rodney Garland pseudonym in 1954. A final novel, The Struggle with the Angels, was published posthumously by Allan Wingate in 1956.

== Personal life and death ==
De Hegedus was gay, and enjoyed life in London because it allowed him the freedom to live that way. He befriended writer André Gide in Paris. The author Peter Wildeblood, in his collection A Way of Life (1956) painted an unflattering portrait of De Hegedus as vain, obsessed with aristocracy, and secretly delighted in being the pseudonymous author of The Heart in Exile.

On 9 October 1955, De Hegedus collapsed in London. He was taken to Westminster Hospital where he died, aged 48. According to his death certificate, the cause of death was acute adrenal failure. In A Way of Life, Wildeblood claimed that he went through De Hegedus's flat after his death and destroyed his personal correspondence.

== Works ==
As Adam de Hegedus

- "The Golden Cock" (1934), short story in Lovat Dickson's Magazine
- Hungarian Background (1937), non-fiction
- Don't Keep the Vanman Waiting (1944), non-fiction
- Rehearsal Under the Moon (1946), novel
- The State of the World (1946), non-fiction
- Patriotism or Peace? (1947), non-fiction
- Strangers Here Ourselves (1949), non-fiction
- Home and Away (1951), non-fiction
- The Struggle with the Angels (1956), novel

As Rodney Garland

- The Heart in Exile (1953), novel
- The Troubled Midnight (1954), novel
