= Less (novel) =

2017 satirical novel by Andrew Sean Greer

- First edition cover
- Author: Andrew Sean Greer
- Illustrator: Lilli Carré
- Cover artist: Leo Espinosa (art); Julianna Lee (design)
- Publisher: Lee Boudreaux Books
- Publication date: July 18, 2017
- Publication place: New York
- Pages: 272
- Awards: Pulitzer Prize for Fiction (2018)
- ISBN: 978-0-316-31612-5
- OCLC: 962814984
- Dewey Decimal: 813/.54
- LC Class: PS3557.R3987 L47 2017
- Followed by: Less Is Lost

Less is a 2017 satirical novel by American author Andrew Sean Greer. The plot follows writer Arthur Less as he travels the world on a literary tour to numb his loss of the man he loves.

The novel won the 2018 Pulitzer Prize for Fiction. The sequel Less Is Lost was published in 2022.

== Plot ==
Arthur Less is a 49-year-old gay writer of middling success from San Francisco, known primarily for having once been in a relationship with an older gentleman, Robert Brownburn, a Pulitzer Prize-winning poet. He first experienced moderate success with his debut novel, but in the decades since has struggled to garner the same success. His most recent novel, Swift, has recently been rejected by his publisher. Arthur, who is dreading his 50th birthday, is suddenly invited to the wedding of his ex-sweetheart, Freddy Pelu. In an attempt to avoid the wedding, Arthur goes on an extensive overseas trip after accepting invitations to the numerous literary engagements which he typically declines.

He first travels to New York City to interview writer H.H.H. Mandern, and then to Mexico City for a conference about Robert. In Turin, Arthur attends an award ceremony where, to his surprise, he wins. He later accepts a teaching offer for a creative writing seminar in Berlin. After a layover in Paris where he meets an old friend, Arthur travels to Morocco to celebrate his 50th birthday in the Sahara. He eventually arrives in India, where he accepts a writer-in-residence at a Christian retreat community in Kerala. Finally, he travels to Japan to write as a food critic. After hearing that Robert has suffered a stroke, Arthur returns home to San Francisco where he finds Freddy there waiting for him.

== Background ==
The book covers themes such as romantic love, relationships, aging, and travel. Greer began writing Less as a "very serious novel" but found that "the only way to write about [being gay and aging] is to make it a funny story. And I found that by making fun of myself, I could actually get closer to real emotion – closer to what I wanted in my more serious books."

== Reception ==
Less won the 2018 Pulitzer Prize for Fiction. In reporting the award, the Associated Press accidentally wrote the novel's title as Fearless. The book also was a New York Times best seller, won the Northern California Book Award, and was a finalist for the Lambda Literary Award for Gay Fiction. In May 2019, Less won International Book of the Year at the Australian Book Industry Awards.
