= Edward Irenaeus Prime-Stevenson =

American novelist (1858–1942)

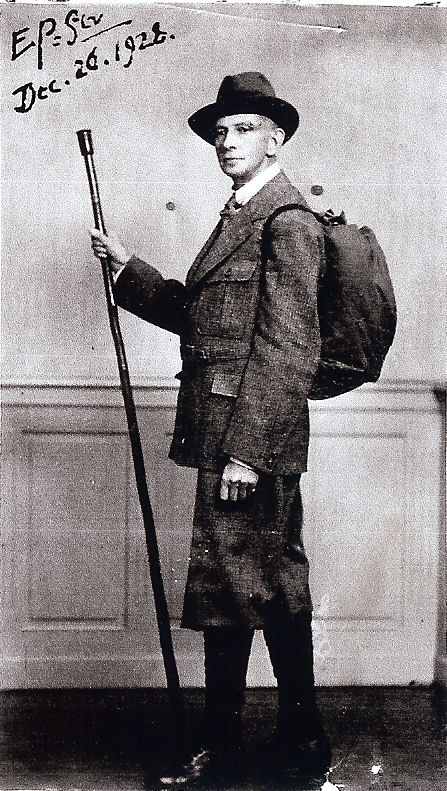
- Prime-Stevenson in 1928
- Born: January 29, 1858; Madison, New Jersey
- Died: July 23, 1942 (aged 84); Lausanne, Switzerland
- Occupations: Novelist, journalist
- Writing career
- Pen name: Xavier Mayne

Edward Irenaeus Prime-Stevenson (January 29, 1858 – July 23, 1942) was an American writer. He used the pseudonym Xavier Mayne.

== Biography ==
Prime-Stevenson (also known as Edward Stevenson, Edward Prime Stevenson, and E. Irenaeus Prime Stevenson) was born in 1858 in Madison, New Jersey, the youngest of five children born to Paul E. Stevenson and Cornelia Prime. His father was a Presbyterian minister and a school principal; his mother came from a distinguished literary and academic figures.

After studying law, Stevenson decided to become a writer and a journalist. During the 1880s, he began a career as a critic in New York City for Harper's Weekly, a political magazine, and as book reviewer and music critic for the weekly Independent. In 1896, Stevenson published The Square of Sevens, and the Parallelogram: An Authoritative Method of Cartomancy with a Prefatory Note by Robert Antrobus that was supposedly written in 1735. However, it is believed that Prime-Stevenson was the author. In 1906, under the pseudonym Xavier Mayne, Stevenson published the homosexually themed novel Imre: A Memorandum, and in 1908 a sexology study, The Intersexes, a defense of homosexuality from a scientific, legal, historical, and personal perspective.

== Death ==
In 1901, he moved to Europe, living in Florence and Lausanne. He died in Lausanne of a heart attack in 1942, aged 84.

== Quotes ==
"Between a protozoan and the most perfect development of the mammalia, we trace a succession of dependent intersteps...A trilobite is at one end of Nature's workshop: a Spinoza, a Shakespeare, a Beethoven is at the other... gone on insisting that each specimen of sex in humanity must... follow out two programmes only, or else be thought amiss, imperfect, and degenerate [?] Why have we set up masculinity and femininity as processes that have not perfectly logical and respectable inter-steps?".

— Xavier Mayne, History of Similisexualism

== Bibliography ==
- Prime-Stevenson, Edward; Trow's Printing and Bookbinding Company (1887), White cockades : an incident of the "forty-five", Charles Scribner's Sons, OCLC 2163459
- Prime-Stevenson, Edward (1891), Left to themselves: being the ordeal of Philip and Gerald, New York, Hunt & Eaton, OCLC 9777119
- Prime-Stevenson, Edward (1906), Imre: A Memorandum, The English Book-Press
- Prime-Stevenson, Edward Irenaeus (1908), The intersexes : a history of similisexualism as a problem in social life
- Prime-Stevenson, Edward (1913), Her enemy, some friends and other personages, stories and studies mostly of human hearts, G. & R. Obsner, OCLC 458170986
- Prime-Stevenson, Edward (2024), Aan hun lot overgelaten, Carolus den Blanken
