= Andrew Sean Greer =

American novelist and short story writer (born 1970)

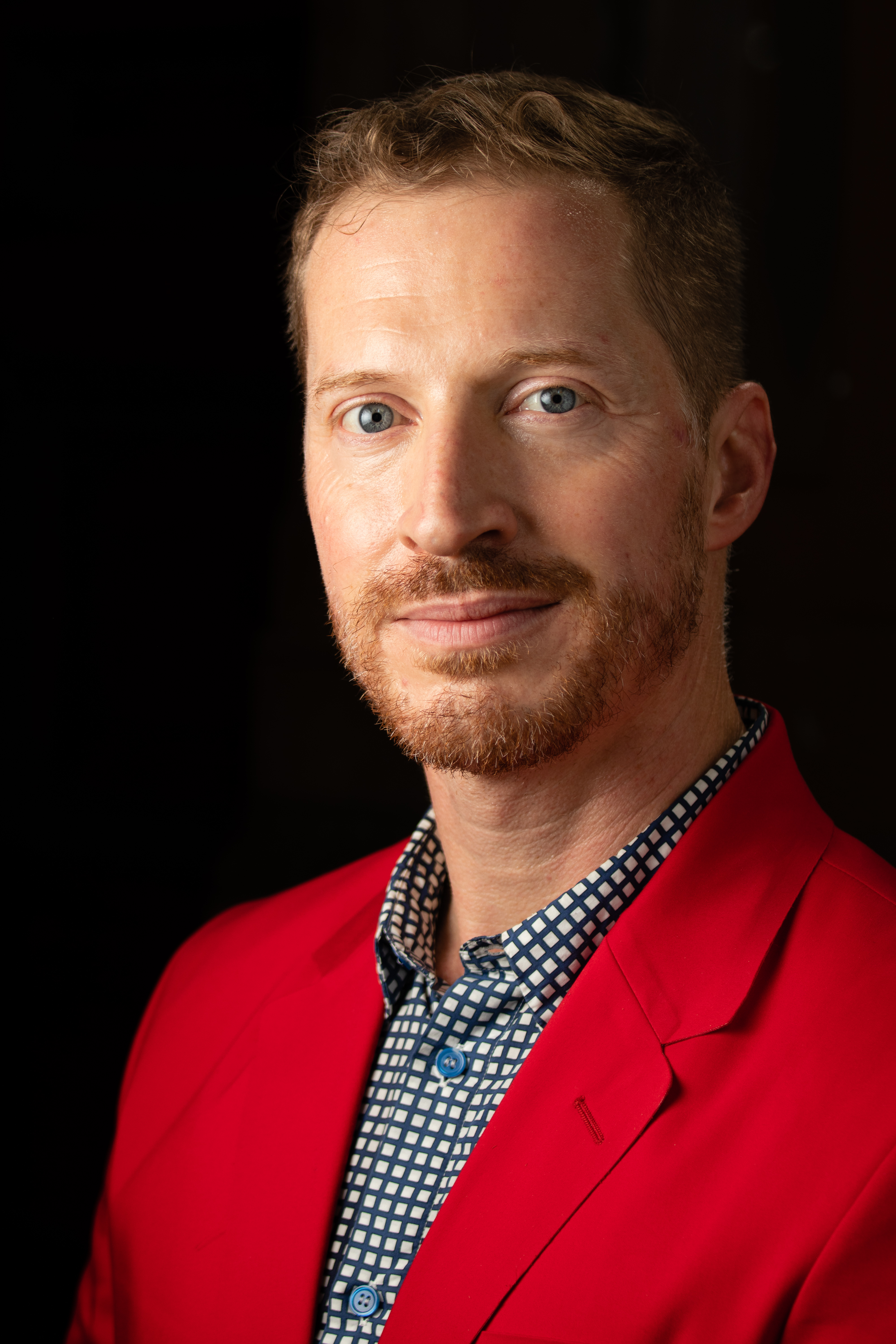
- Greer at the Pulitzer Prizes ceremony, 2018
- Born: November 21, 1970 (age 55); Washington D.C., U.S.
- Education: Brown University (BA); University of Montana (MFA)
- Occupation: Novelist
- Writing career
- Years active: 2001–present
- Genre: Fiction
- Notable awards: Pulitzer Prize for Fiction (2018)
- Website: andrewgreer.com

Andrew Sean Greer (born November 21, 1970) is an American novelist and short story writer. Greer received the 2018 Pulitzer Prize for Fiction for his novel Less. He is the author of The Story of a Marriage, which The New York Times has called an "inspired, lyrical novel", and The Confessions of Max Tivoli, which was named one of the best books of 2004 by the San Francisco Chronicle and received a California Book Award.

== Biography ==
Andrew Sean Greer was born in November 1970, in Washington, D.C., the child of two scientists. He grew up in Rockville, Maryland. He is an identical twin. He graduated from Georgetown Day School, and Brown University, where he studied with Robert Coover and Edmund White, and served as commencement speaker. He lives part-time in Italy.

He is the author of six works of fiction. Greer taught at Freie Universität Berlin and the Iowa Writers' Workshop. He was a finalist for the Premio von Rezzori for a work translated into Italian, a Today Show pick, a New York Public Library Cullman Center Fellow, an NEA Fellow, and a judge for the National Book Award.

== Work ==
Greer's stories have appeared in Esquire, The Paris Review, The New Yorker, and other national publications. They have been anthologized in The Book of Other People and The PEN/O. Henry Prize Stories 2009.

His third book, The Confessions of Max Tivoli, was released in 2004; a New Yorker piece by John Updike called it "enchanting, in the perfumed, dandified style of disenchantment brought to grandeur by Proust and Nabokov." Mitch Albom chose The Confessions of Max Tivoli for the Today Show Book Club, and it soon became a bestseller. The story of a man aging backwards, it was inspired by the Bob Dylan song "My Back Pages." It is similar in theme to the Fitzgerald short story and the film The Curious Case of Benjamin Button.

Greer's fourth book, The Story of a Marriage, was published in 2008. The New York Times said of it: "Mr. Greer seamlessly choreographs an intricate narrative that speaks authentically to the longings and desires of his characters. All the while he never strays from the convincing and steady voice of Pearlie." The Washington Post called it "thoughtful, complex and exquisitely written."

The Impossible Lives of Greta Wells was published in June 2013.

His novel Less was published in 2017 and received the 2018 Pulitzer Prize for Fiction. A follow-up, Less is Lost, was published in 2022 and debuted on The New York Times Best Sellers list.

In Greer's novel Villa Coco, released in June 2026, Greer introduced a new protagonist: an American archivist fresh out of college, who takes on a job in Tuscany, cataloguing the house of a Baroness.

== Awards and prizes ==
- Northern California Book Award
- California Book Award
- Young Lions Fiction Award 2005 for The Confessions of Max Tivoli
- Fellowships from the National Endowment for the Arts and the New York Public Library
- O. Henry Award for the short story "Darkness"
- Fernanda Pivano Award 2014 for American Literature in Italy
- Pulitzer Prize for Fiction 2018 for Less
- PEN Oakland Josephine Miles Literary Award 2018 for Less

== Bibliography ==
=== Novels ===
- —— (2001). The Path of Minor Planets: A Novel. St. Martin's Press. ISBN 9780312275563.
- —— (2004). The Confessions of Max Tivoli. Picador. ISBN 9780312423810.
- —— (2008). The Story of a Marriage. Picador. ISBN 9780312428280.
- —— (2013). The Impossible Lives of Greta Wells. HarperCollins. ISBN 9780062213785.
- —— (2017). Less: A Novel. Lee Boudreaux Books. ISBN 9780316316125.
- —— (2022). Less Is Lost. Lee Boudreaux Books. ISBN 9780316498906.
- —— (2026). Villa Coco. London, U.K.: Sceptre. ISBN 9781399757287.

=== Short fiction collections ===
- —— (2000). How It Was for Me. St. Martin's Press. ISBN 9780312241261.

=== Stories ===
Title	Year	First published	Reprinted/collected	Notes
"It's a summer day"	2017	Greer, Andrew Sean (June 19, 2017). "It's a summer day". The New Yorker. Vol. 93, no. 17. pp. 54–60.		
