= Rose window =

Circular window found in Gothic churches

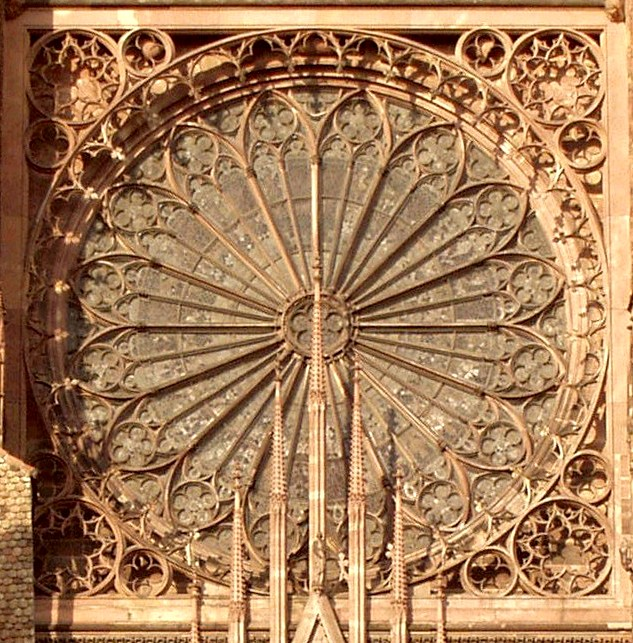
Exterior of the rose at Strasbourg Cathedral, France

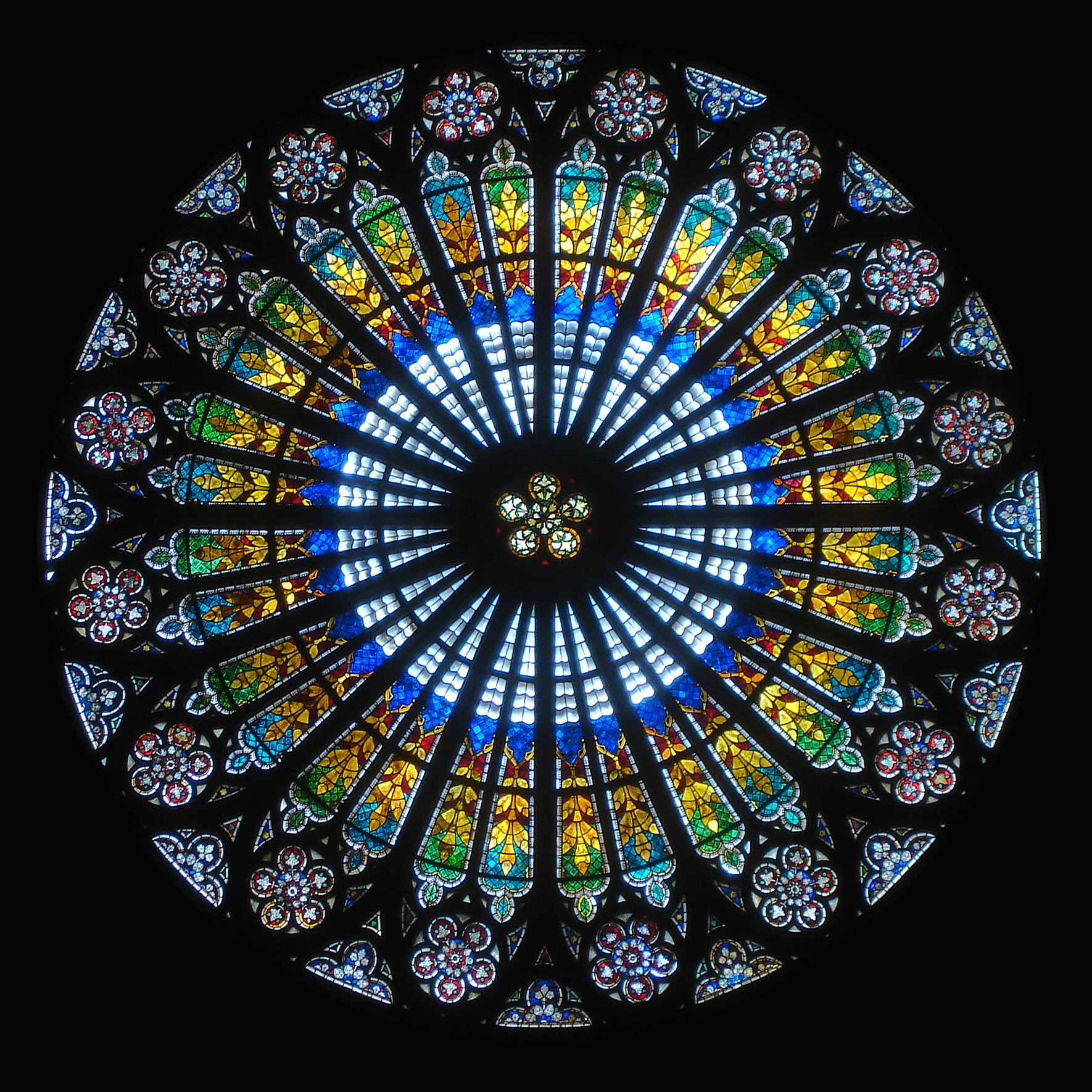
Interior of the rose at Strasbourg Cathedral

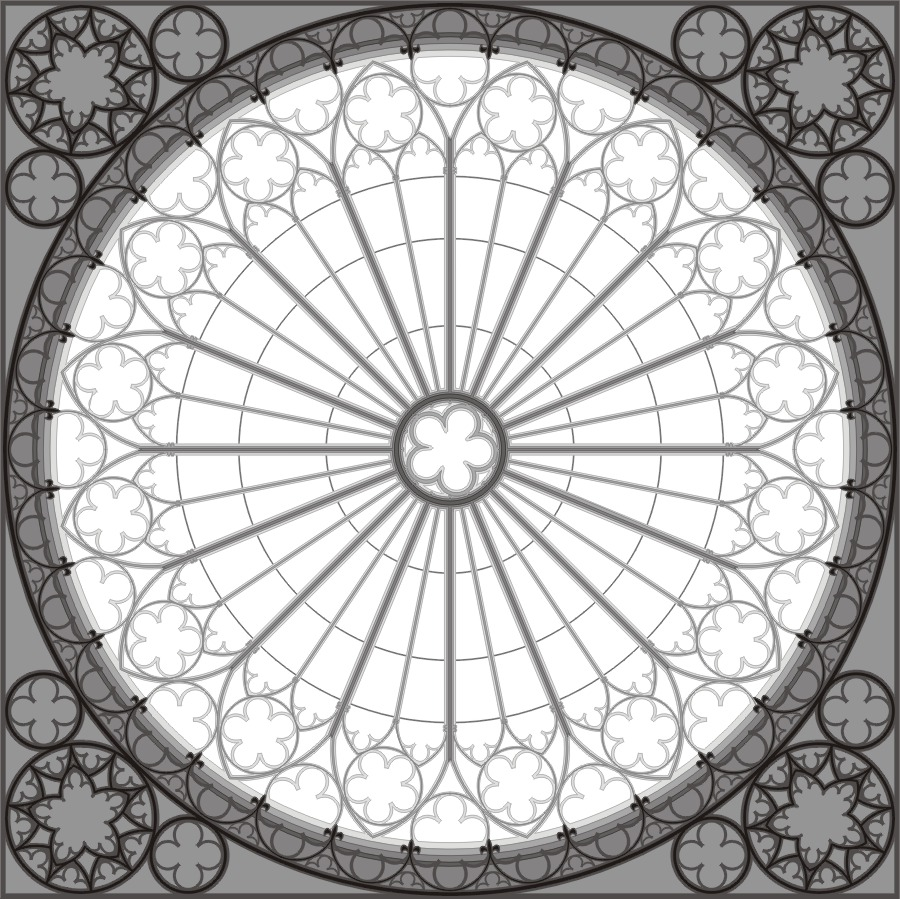
Architectural drawing of the rose window of Strasbourg Cathedral

Rose window is often used as a generic term applied to a circular window, but is especially used for those found in Gothic cathedrals and churches. The windows are divided into segments by stone mullions and tracery. The term rose window was not used before the 17th century and comes from the English flower name rose.

The name "wheel window" is often applied to a window divided by simple spokes radiating from a central boss or opening, while the term "rose window" is reserved for those windows, sometimes of a highly complex design, which can be seen to bear similarity to a multi-petalled rose. Rose windows are also called "Catherine windows" after Saint Catherine of Alexandria, who was sentenced to be executed on a spiked breaking wheel. A circular window without tracery such as are found in many Italian churches, is referred to as an ocular window or oculus.

Rose windows are particularly characteristic of Gothic architecture and may be seen in all the major Gothic cathedrals of Northern France. Their origins are much earlier than Gothic architecture, however, and rose windows may be seen in various forms throughout the Medieval period. Their popularity was revived, with other medieval features, during the Gothic revival of the 19th century, so that they are seen in Christian churches all over the world.

== Style ==
- Oculi: These could be open or blind, could be glazed or filled with thin alabaster. During the late Gothic period very large ocular windows were common in Italy, being used in preference to traceried windows and being filled with elaborate pictures in stained glass designed by the most accomplished Late Medieval and Early Renaissance designers including Duccio, Donatello, Uccello and Ghiberti.
- Wheel Windows: These windows had a simple tracery of spokes radiating either from a central boss or from a central roundel. Popular during the Romanesque period and Gothic Italy, they are found across Europe but particularly Germany and Italy. They also occur in Romanesque Revival buildings of the 19th and 20th centuries.
- Plate Tracery: Rose windows with pierced openings rather than tracery occur in the transition between Romanesque and Gothic, particularly in France and most notably at Chartres. The most notable example in England is the north transept window, known as the "Dean's Eye" in Lincoln Cathedral. These windows are occasionally found in 19th-century Revival buildings.
- Early Gothic: Rose windows with tracery comprising overlapping arcs like flower petals, circular and square shapes. This form occurs in Northern France, notably at Laon Cathedral, Italy and England. This style of window is popular in Gothic Revival architecture for the similarity that it has to a flower and is also utilised with specific reference to Our Lady of the Rosary.
- Rayonnant Gothic: The rose windows are divided by mullions radiating from a central roundel, overlapping in a complex design, each light terminating in a pointed arch and often interspersed with quatrefoils and other such shapes. Many of the largest rose windows in France are of this type, notably those at Paris and in the transepts of St Denis. An example in England is that in the north transept of Westminster Abbey. This style occurs widely in Gothic churches and is also widely imitated in Gothic Revival buildings.
- Flamboyant Gothic: The style is marked by S-curves in the tracery causing each light to take on a flamelike or "flamboyant" shape. Many windows are composed of fairly regularly shaped lights the richness of design dependent on the multiplicity of parts. Good examples are at Beauvais Cathedral and Sainte-Chapelle, Paris. Some Late Gothic rose windows are of immense complexity of design, often using elements of the Gothic style in unexpected ways. A magnificent example is that of the façade of Amiens Cathedral. Although the design usually radiates from a central point, it may not be symmetrical about each axis. This may be seen in the Flamboyant Decorated Gothic window called the "Bishop's Eye" at Lincoln Cathedral in which the design takes the form of two ears of wheat.
- Renaissance: The Renaissance made a break with the Gothic style, and a return to the Classical. Plain untraceried oculi were sometimes employed, either in Classical pediments or around domes as at the Pazzi Chapel, Florence.
- Baroque: The Baroque style saw much greater use of ocular windows, which were not always circular, but frequently oval or of a more complex shape. They were untraceried or crossed by mullions of very simple form but were often surrounded by ornate carving. The purpose of such windows was the subtle illumination of interior spaces, without resorting to large windows offering external visibility. They rarely form a dominant visual element to either the façade or the interior as do the great Gothic windows. However, there are some notable exceptions, in particular the glorious burst of light which pours through the oval alabaster window depicting the Holy Spirit in the Reredos behind the High Altar of St. Peter's Basilica, Rome.
- Modern: Modern circular windows, which are most frequently of a simple ocular type, have an eclectic range of influences which includes abstract art, ship's portholes and the unglazed circular openings of Oriental architecture.
Examples
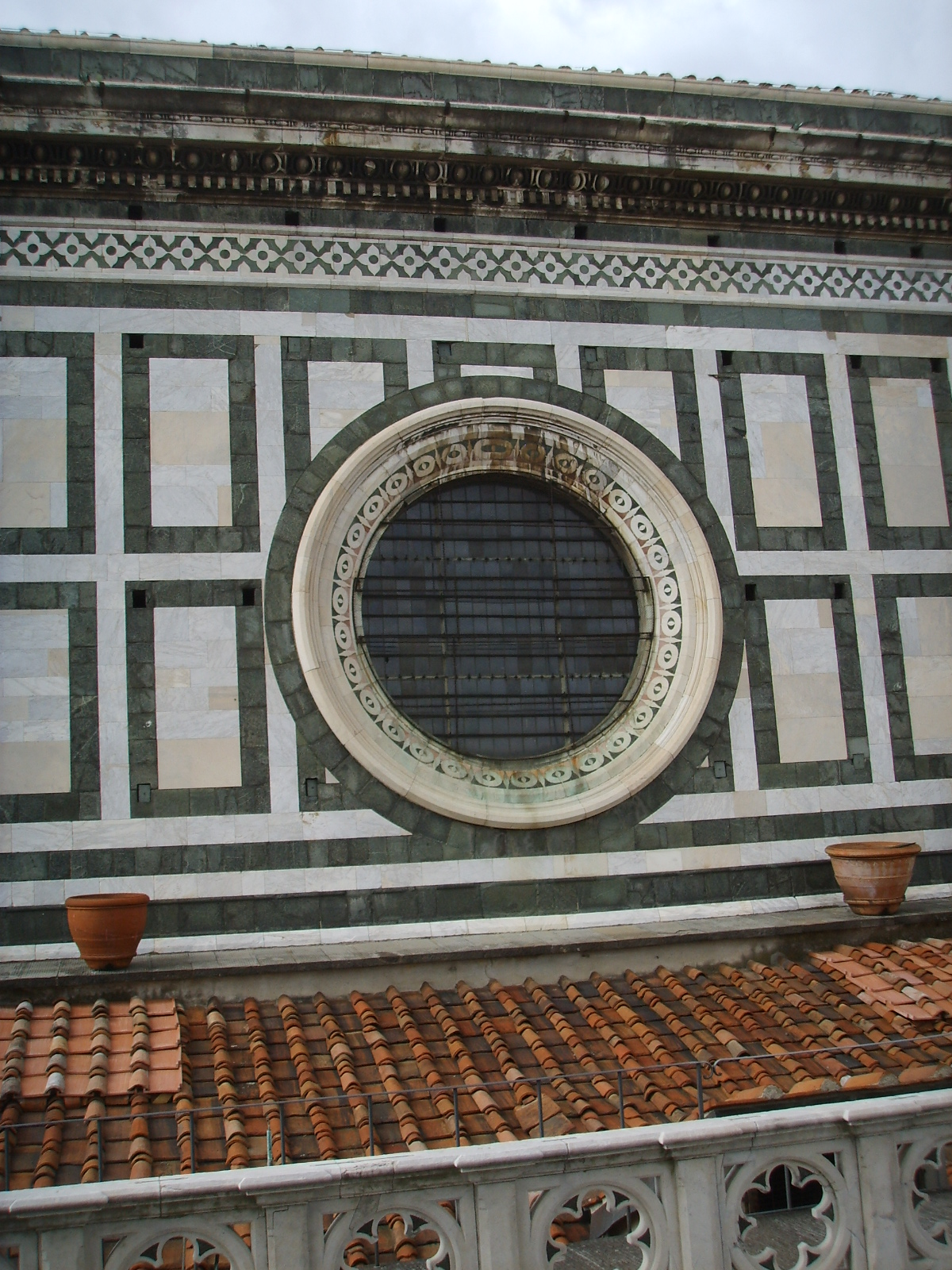
Oculus – Florence Cathedral

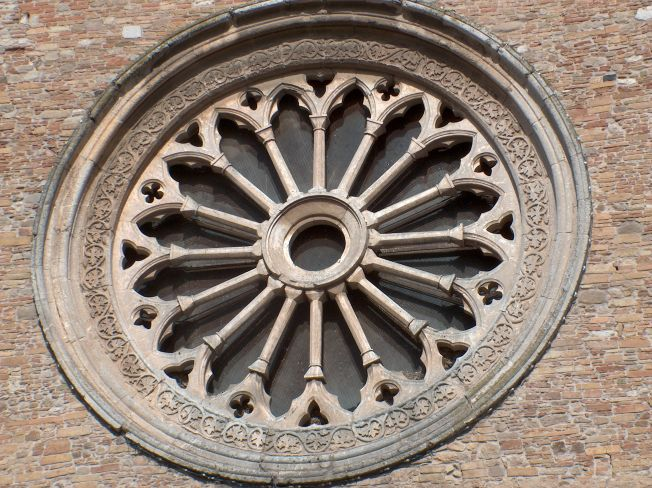
Wheel – Church of San Francesco at Lucera, Italy

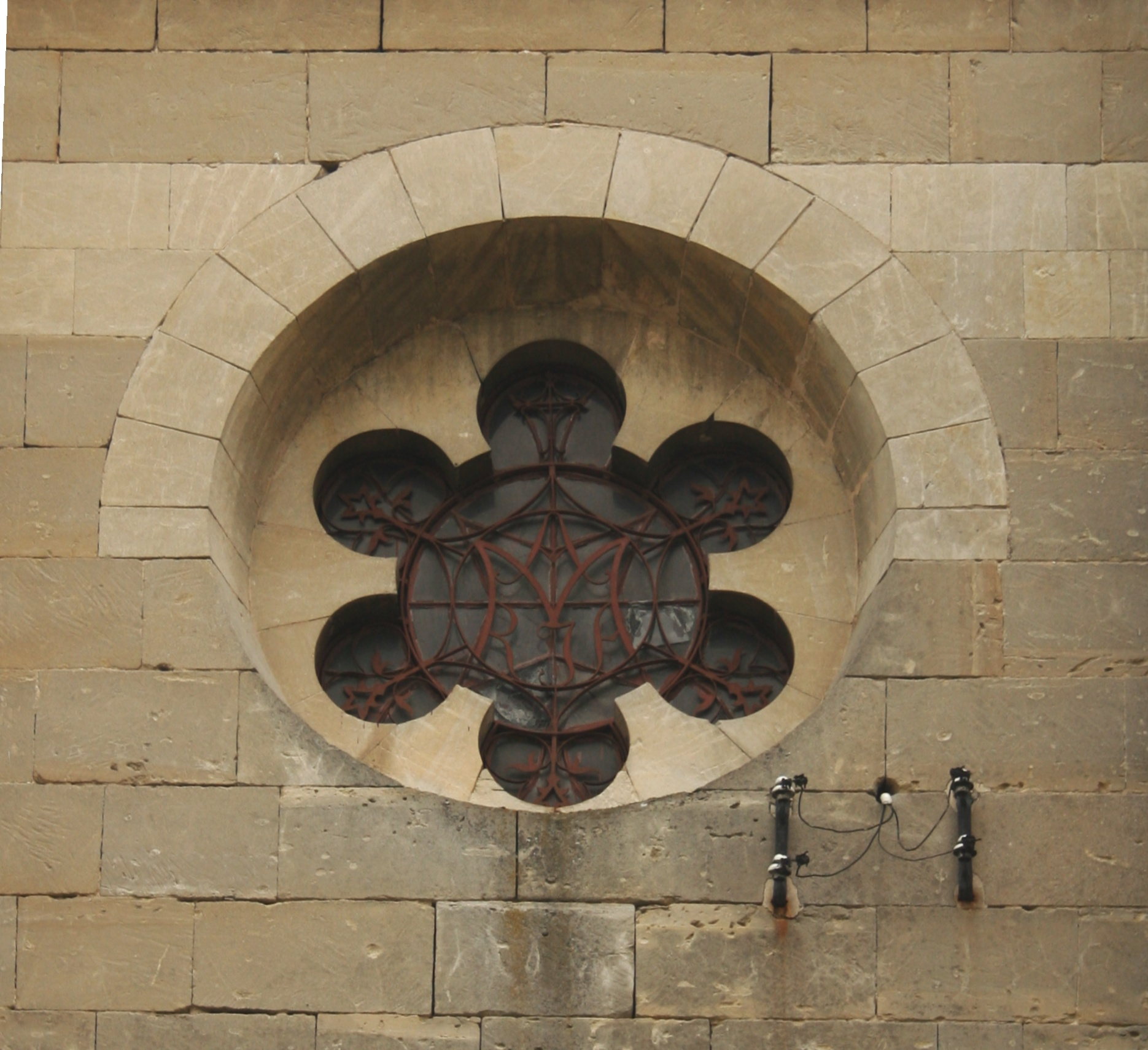
Plate – at Działoszyce, Poland

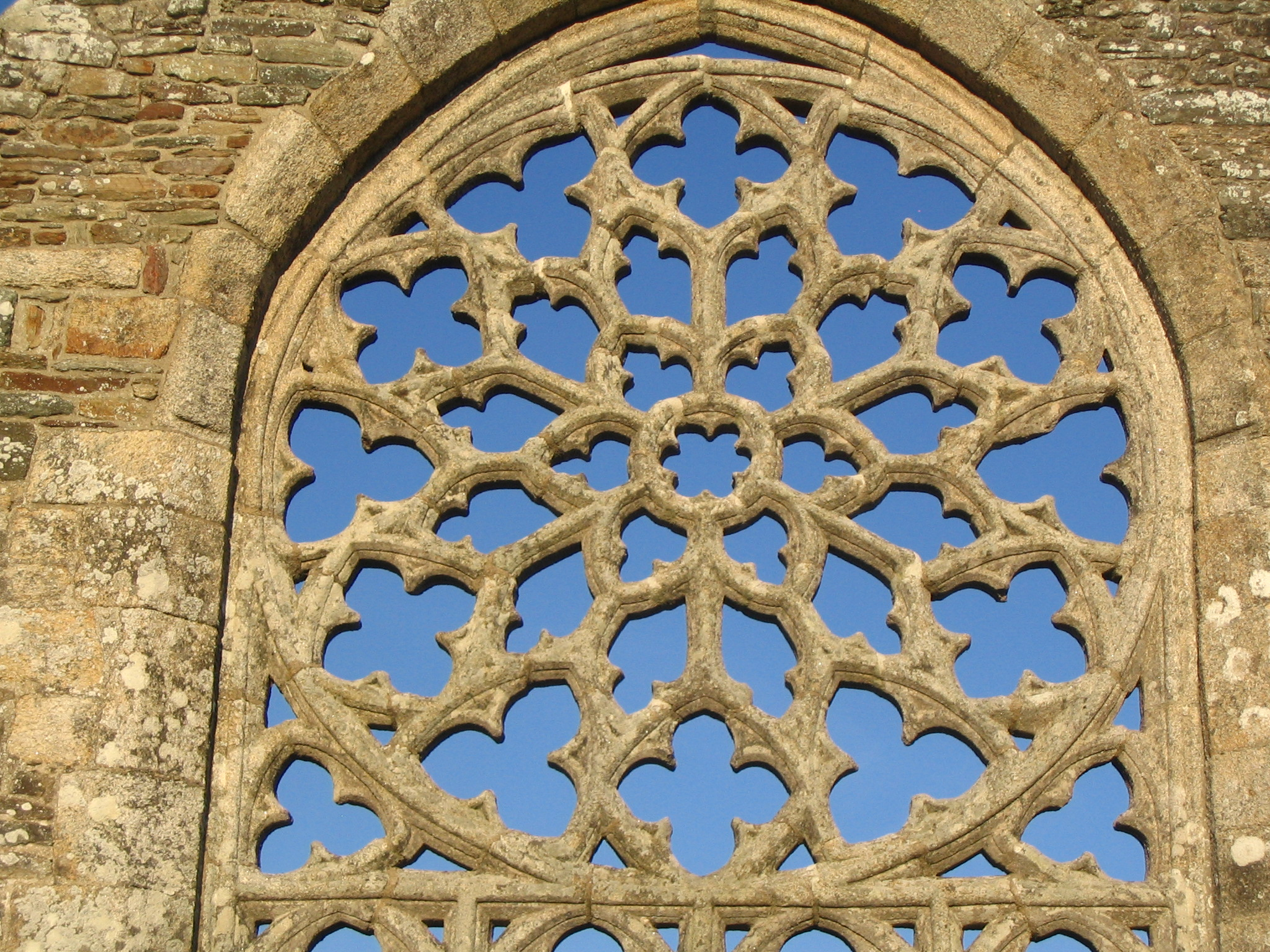
Rayonnant – at the ruins of Languidou Abbey

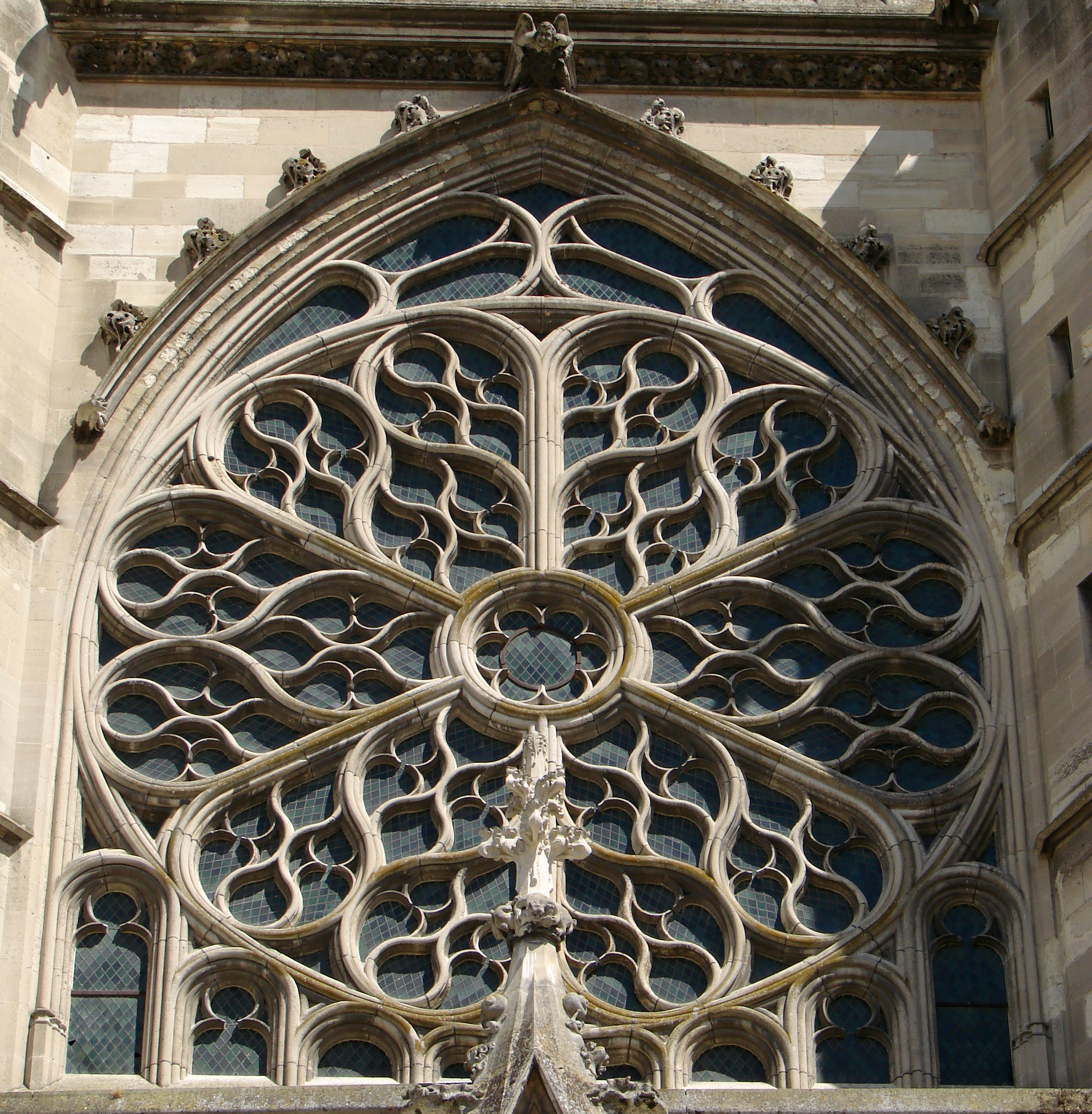
Flamboyant – Meaux Cathedral, France

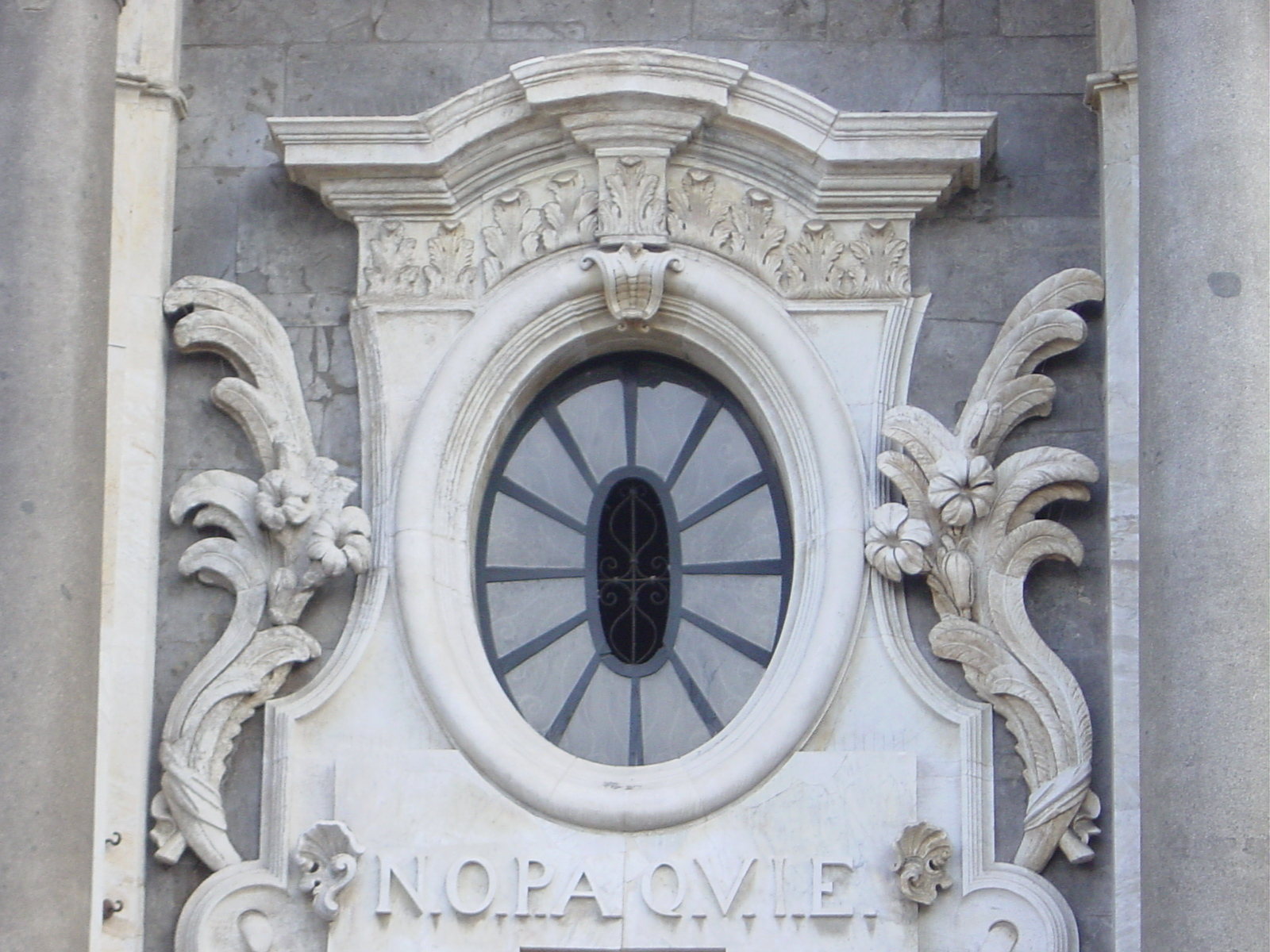
Baroque – Catania

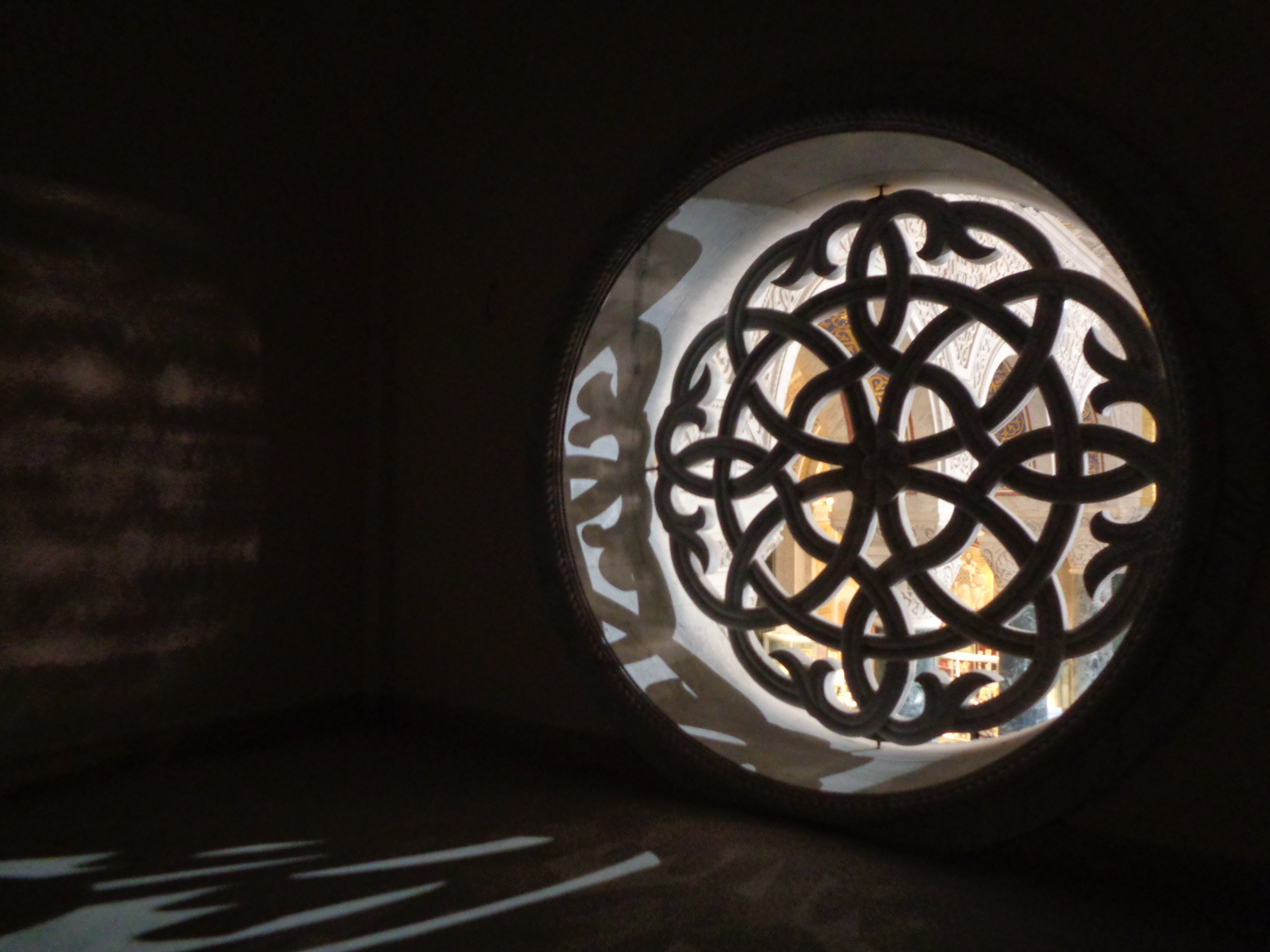
Modern – Church of Saint Sava, Serbia

== History ==
=== Origin ===
The origin of the rose window may be found in the Roman oculus. These large circular openings let in both light and air, the best known being that at the top of the dome of the Pantheon. Geometrical patterns similar to those in rose windows occur in Roman mosaics.

The German art historian Otto von Simson (1912-1993) considered that the origin of the rose window lay in a window with the six-lobed rosettes and octagon which adorned the external wall of the Umayyad palace Khirbat al-Mafjar near Jericho, built between 740 and 750 CE. This theory suggests that crusaders brought the design of this attractive window to Europe, introducing it to churches. But the decorative pattern for rose and, independently, the tracery, are very present in vestiges of the early Christian architecture, Byzantine architecture, and especially in Merovingian art, and Visigothic architecture before the Muslim conquest of Spain. Half roses are also known, as with the church of San Juan Bautista in Baños de Cerrato. The scarcity and the brittleness of the vestiges of this time does not make it possible to say that the complete rose window in tracery did not exist in the early Middle Ages.

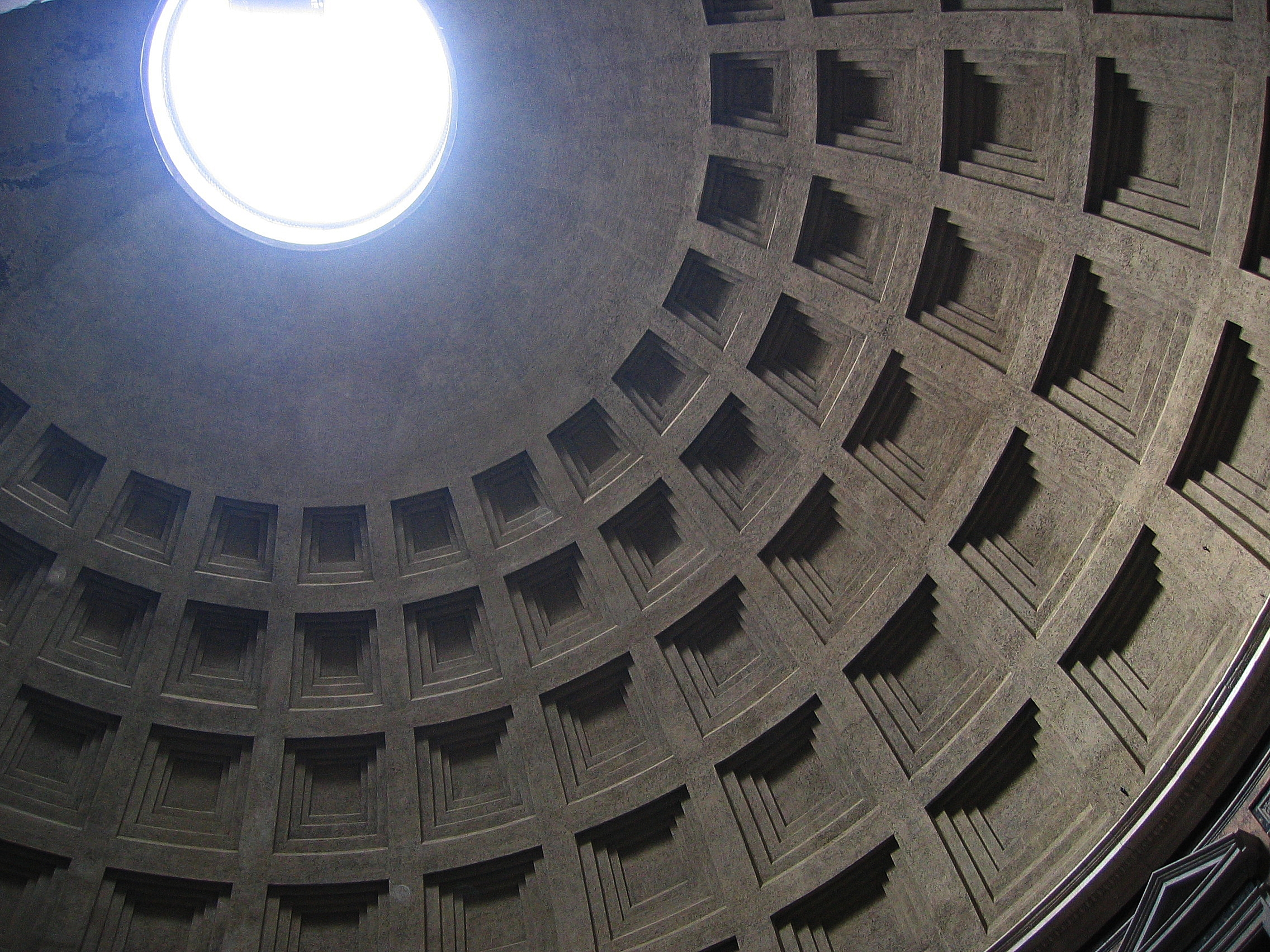
The oculus of the Pantheon, Rome

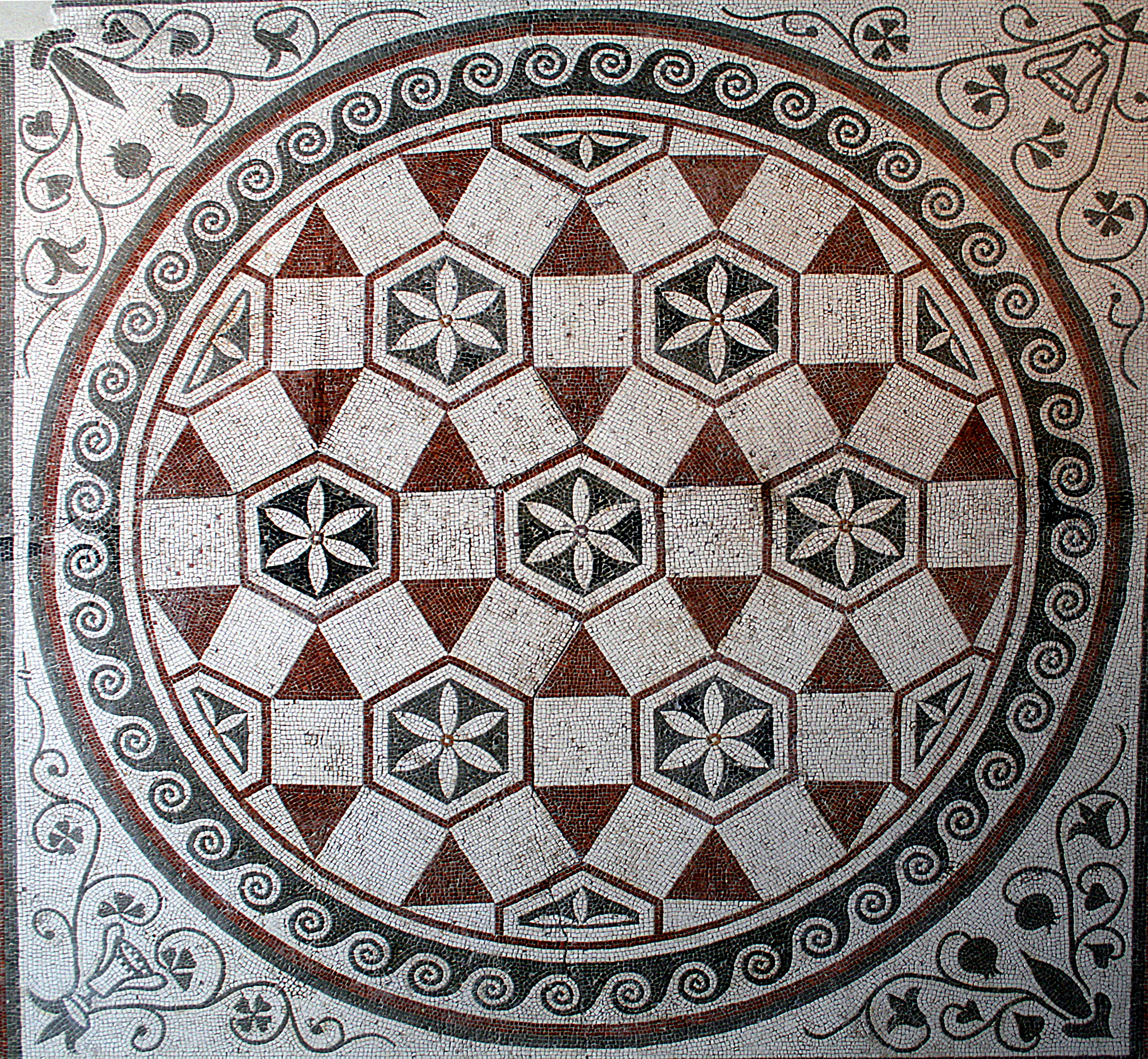
Roman mosaic. Rome

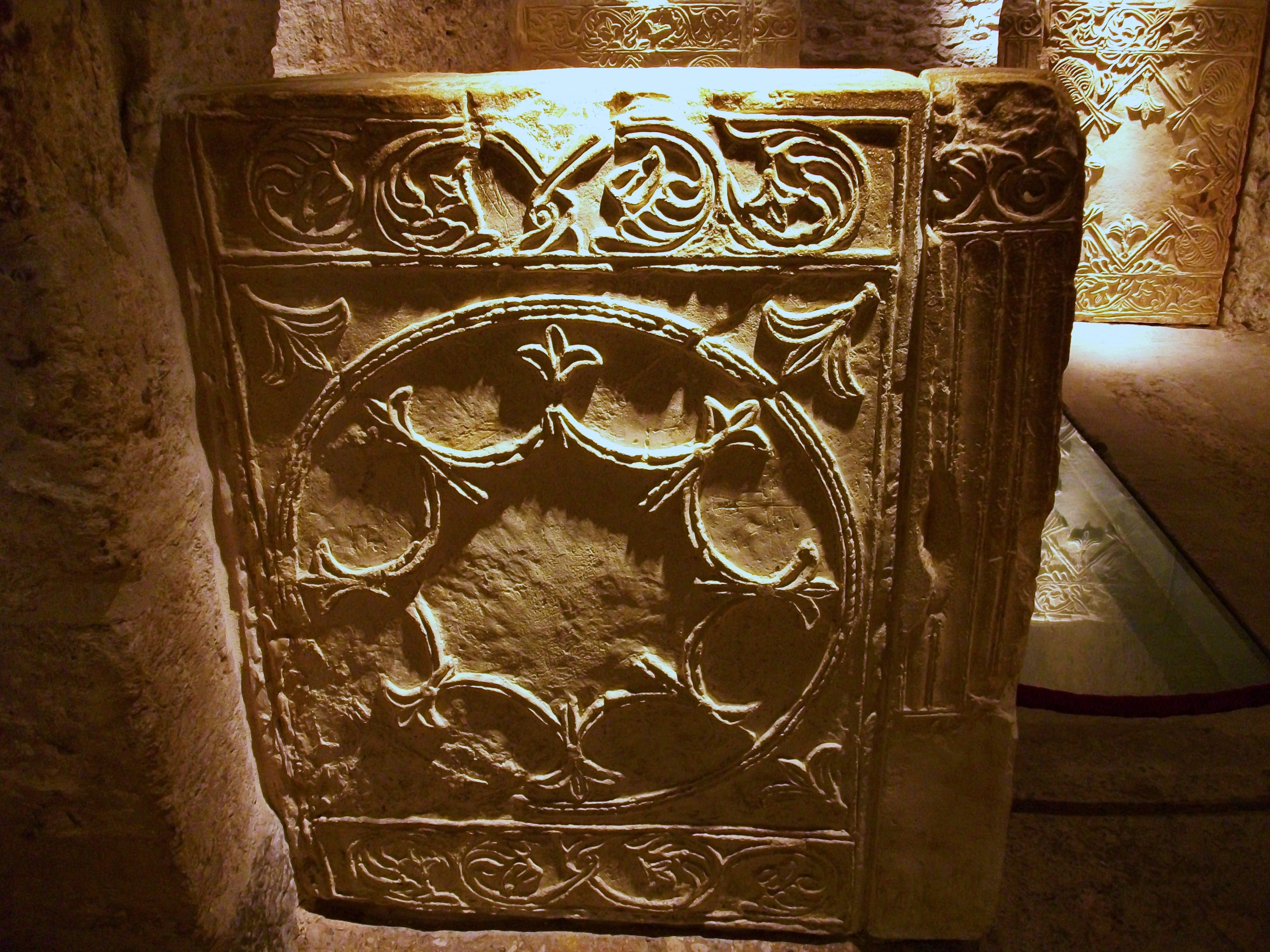
Common Visigothic decoration. Crypt in Valencia Cathedral, 6th–7th century

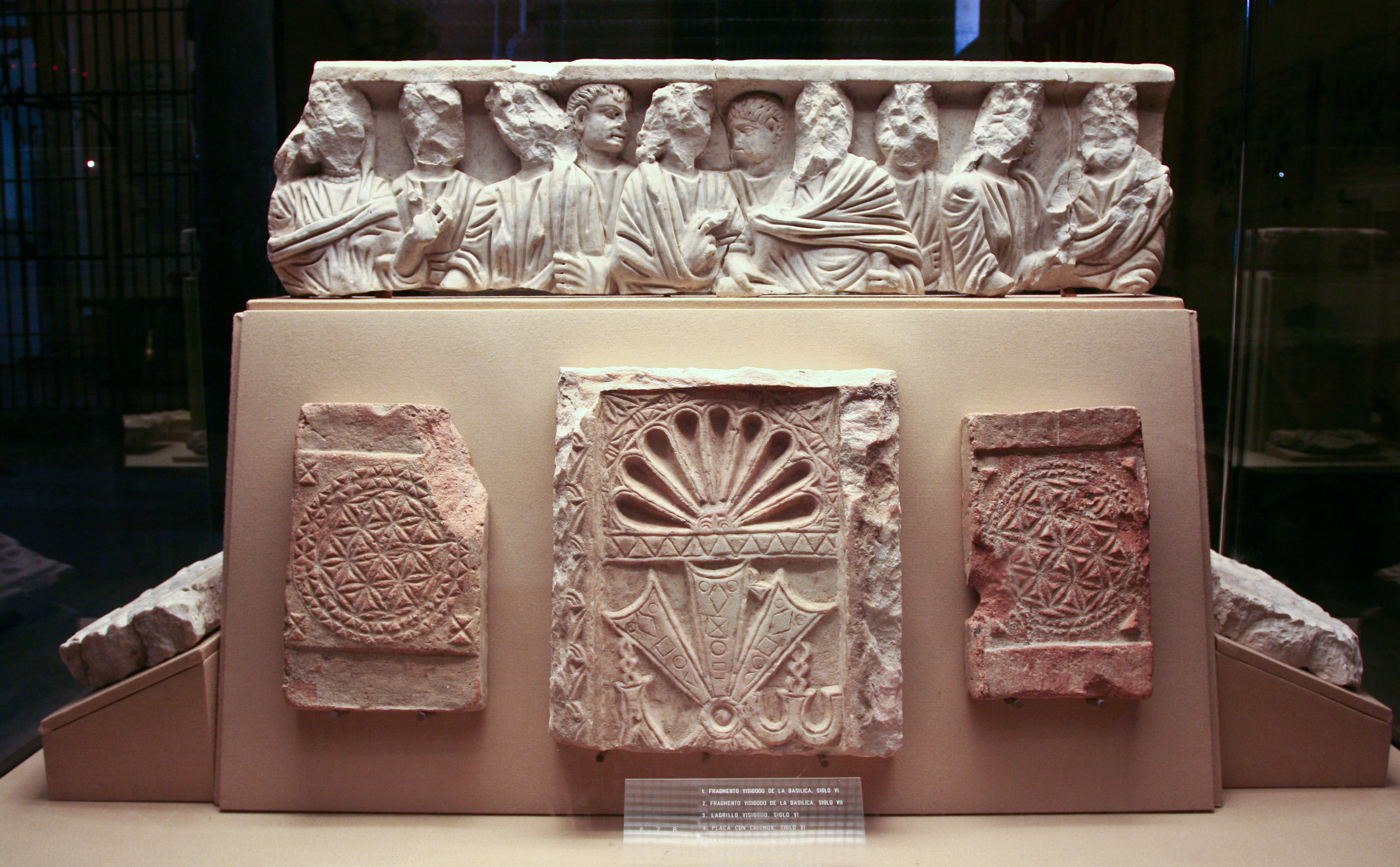
Visigothic design of roses, pre-Islamic, from basilica of Saint Vincent of Lérins of Cordoba, 6–7th century

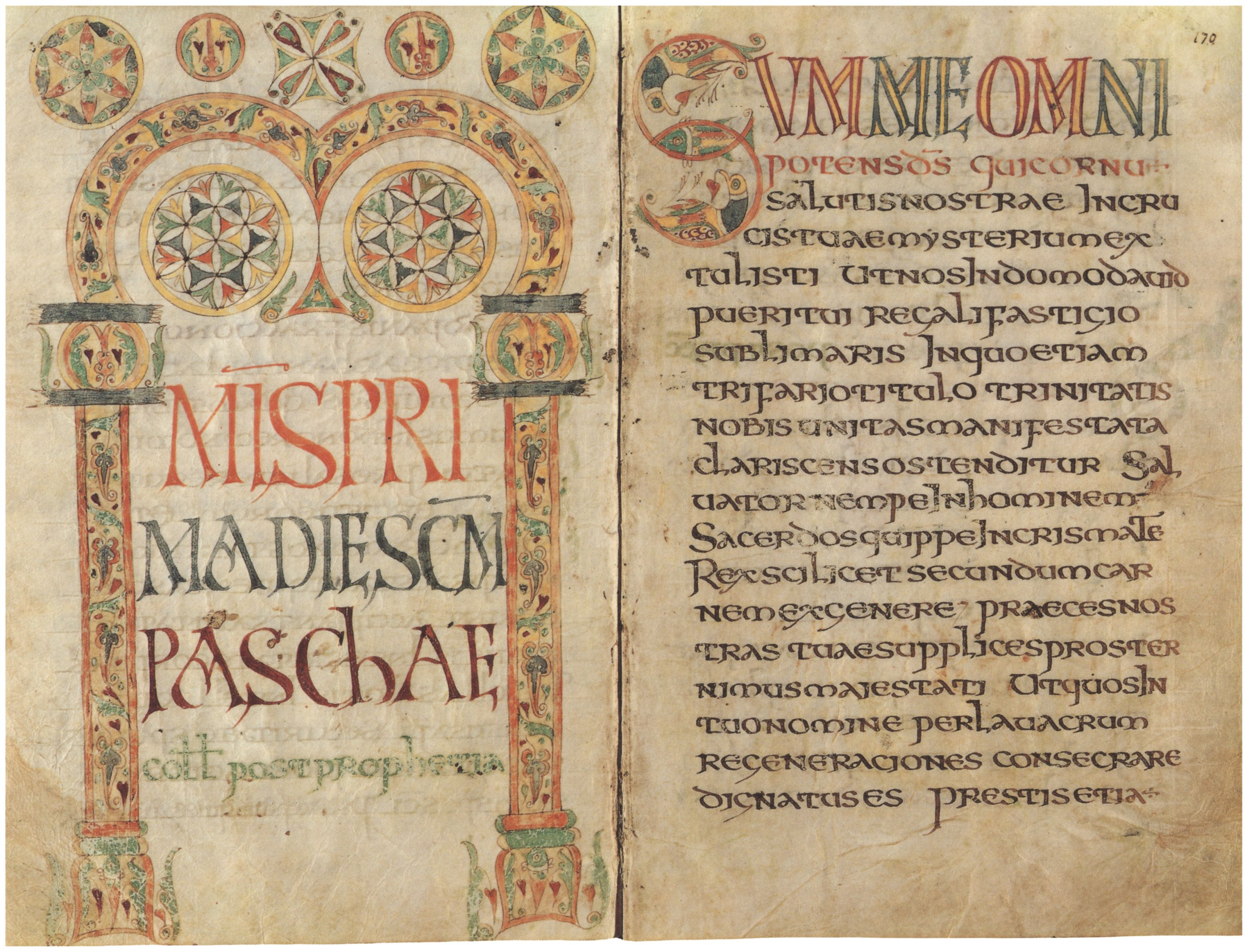
Merovingian illumination in Missale Gothicum, towards 700. The two large roses are six-lobed

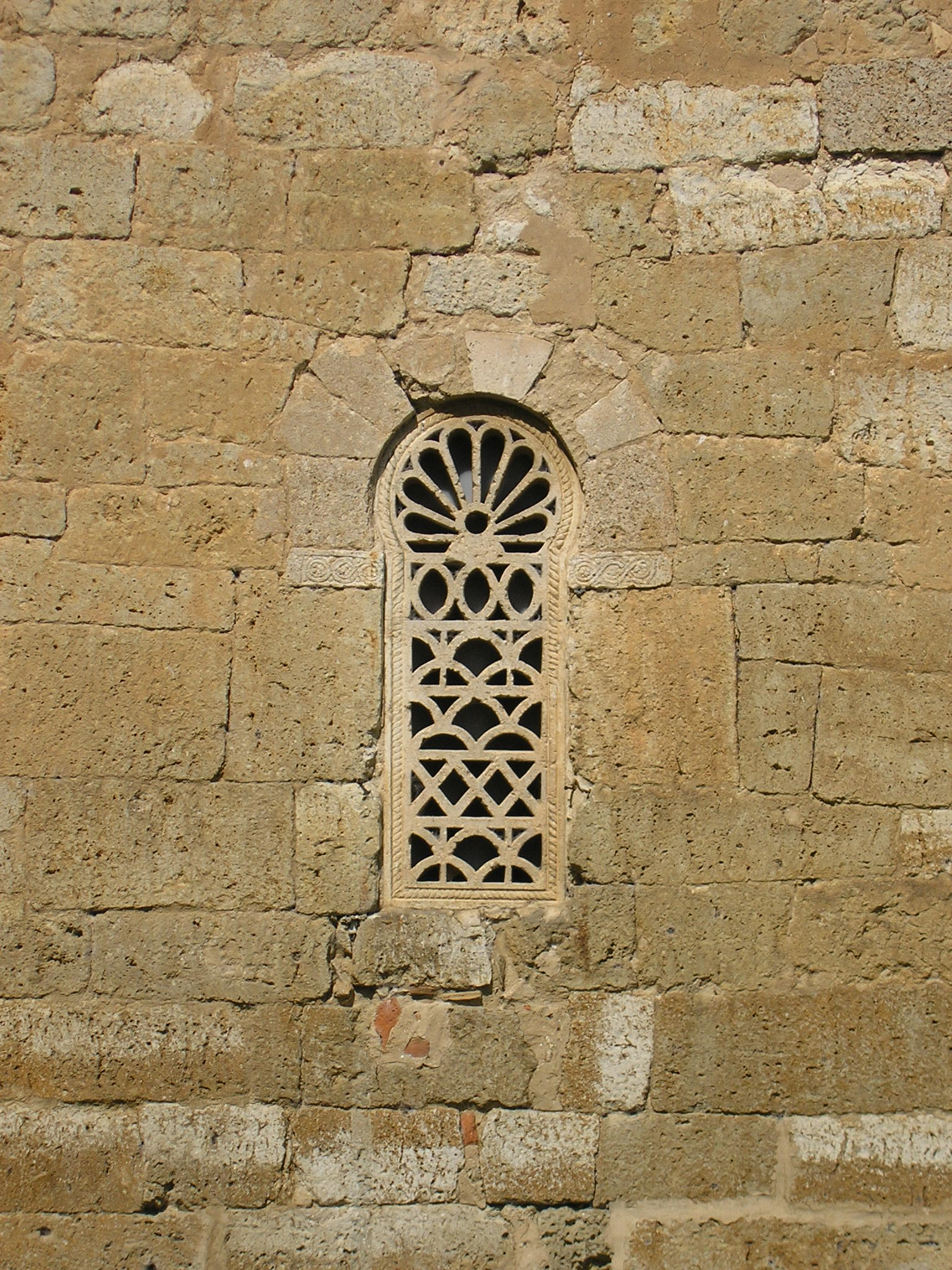
Visigothic window with stone tracery, Church of San Juan Bautista, Baños de Cerrato, 7th century

In Early Christian and Byzantine architecture, there are examples of the use of circular oculi. They usually occur either around the drum of a dome, as at the Church of the Holy Sepulchre, Jerusalem, or high in the end of a gable of low-pitched Classical pediment form, as at Sant'Agnese fuori le mura, Rome, and Torcello Cathedral.

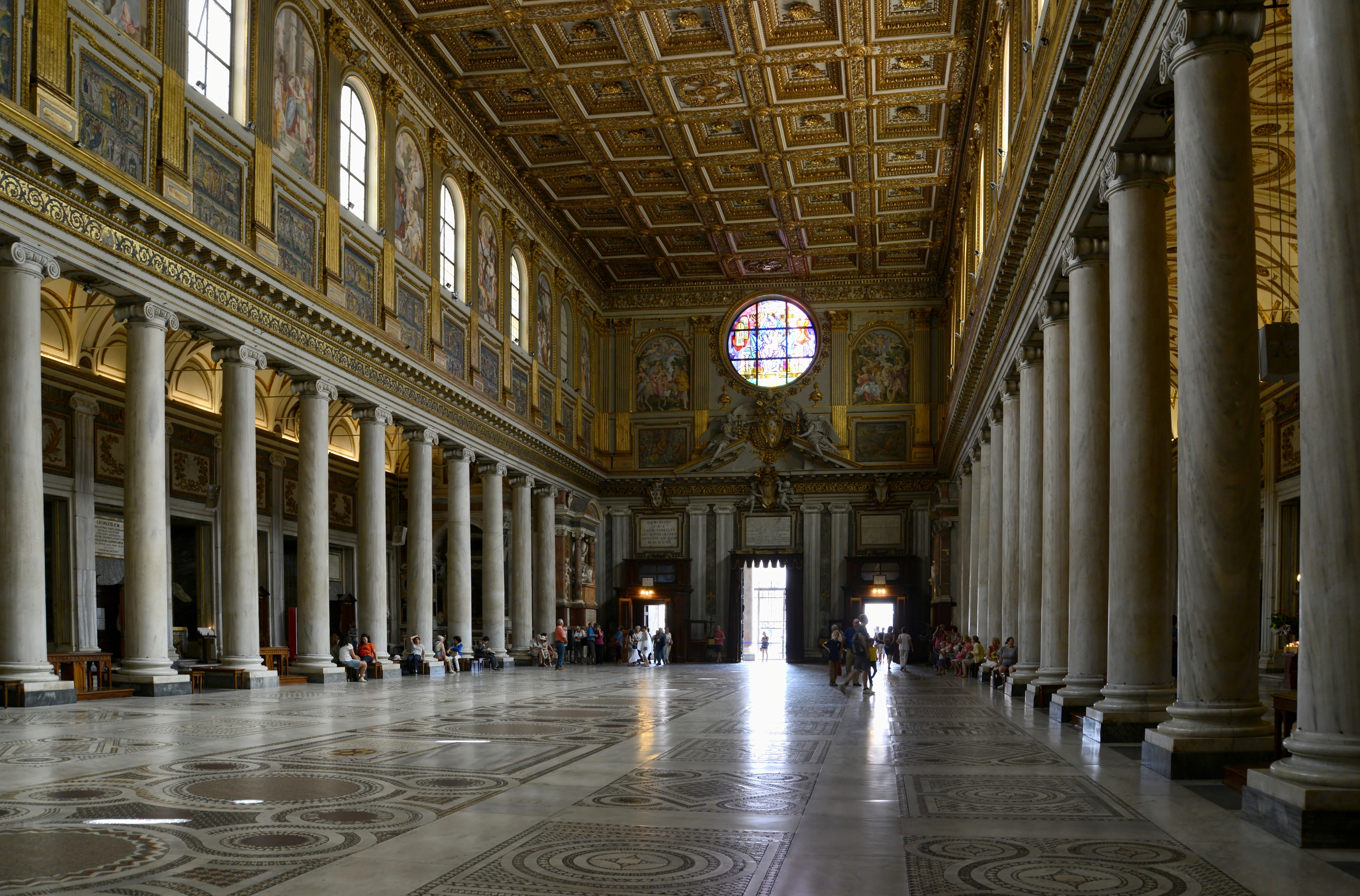
Oculus of Santa Maria Maggiore, Rome, 5th century (decoration is later)

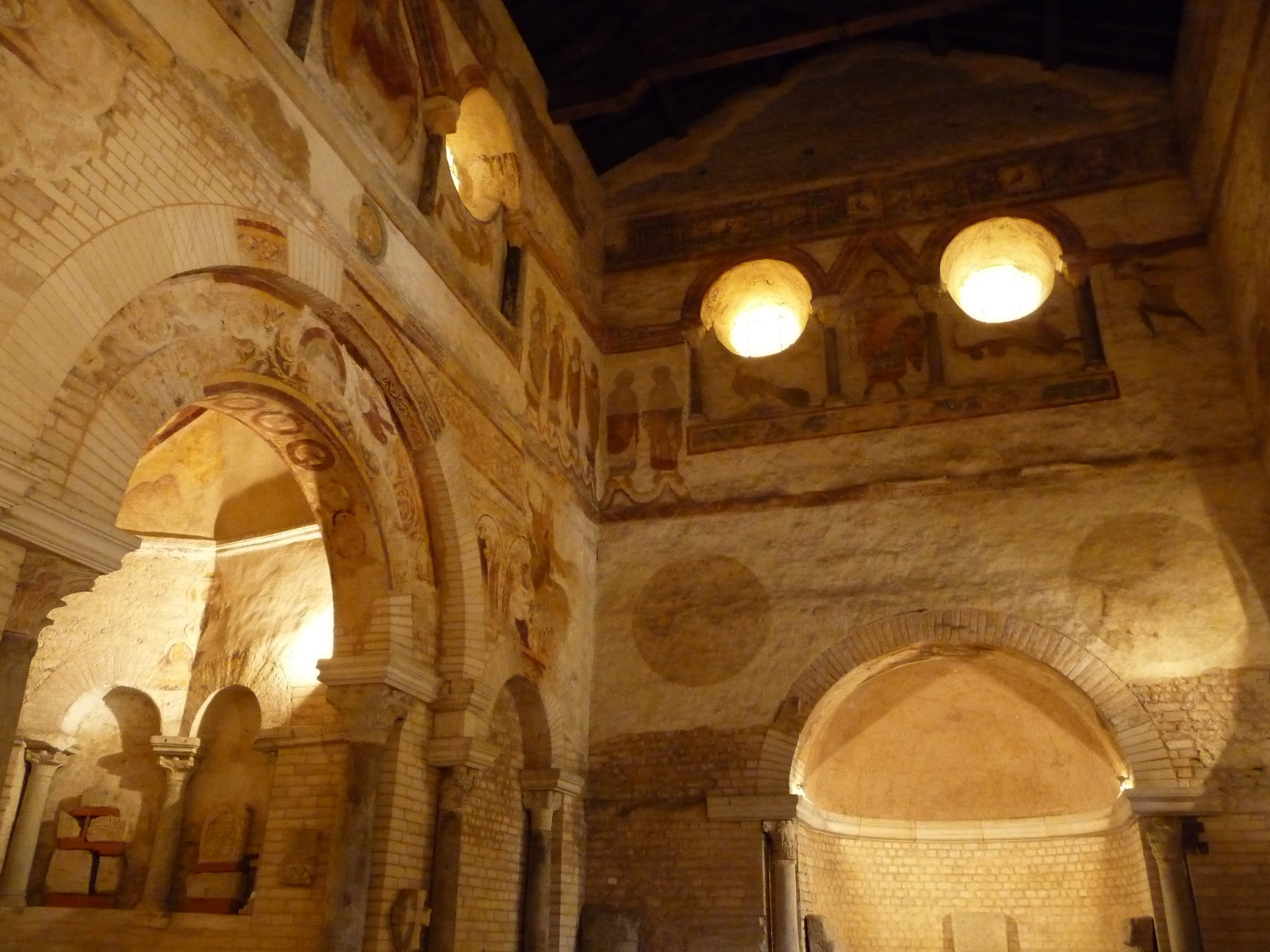
Baptistery of St. John of Poitiers, France, 6-7th century

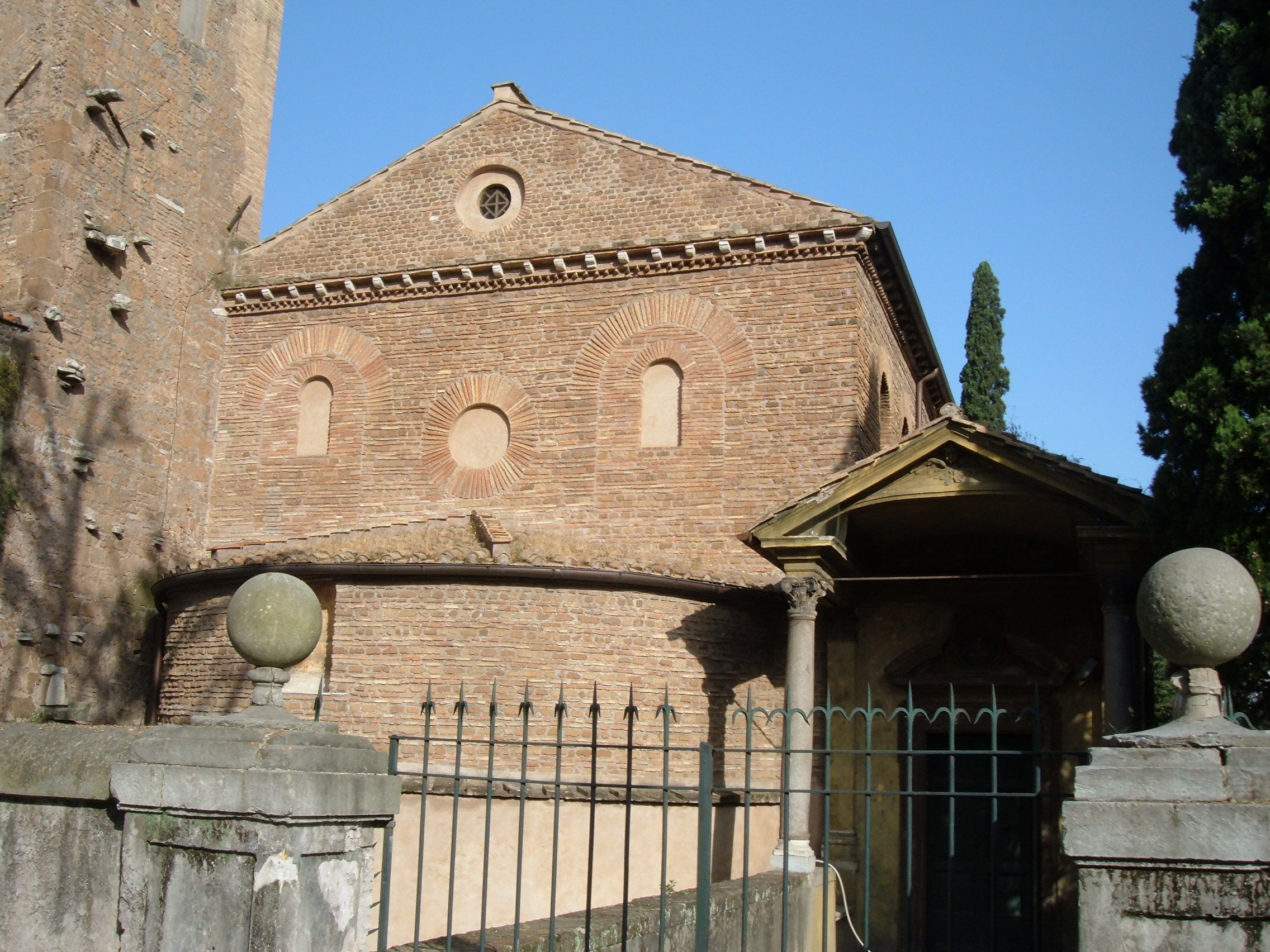
Oculi of Sant'Agnese fuori le mura

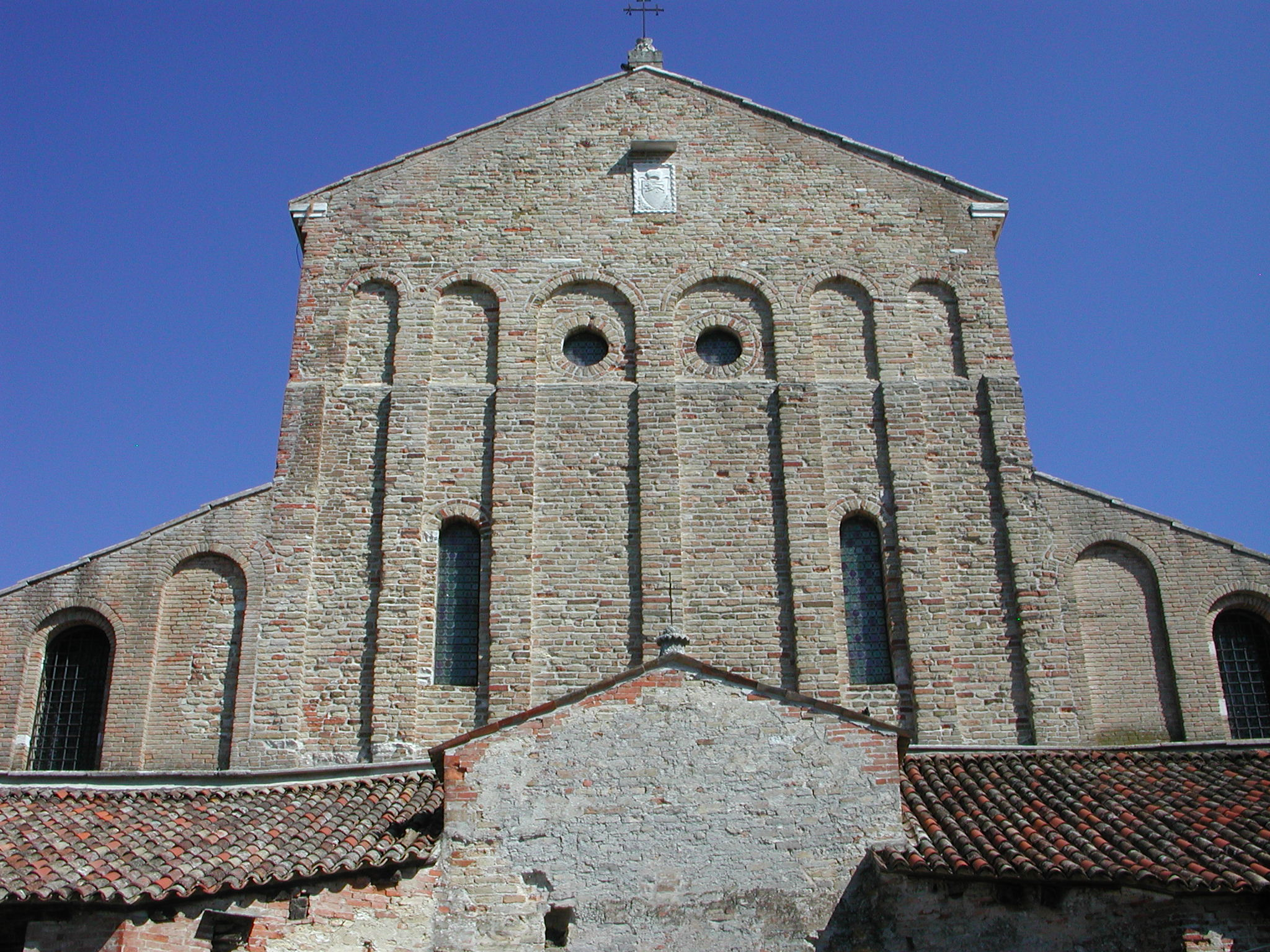
Torcello Cathedral, Venice

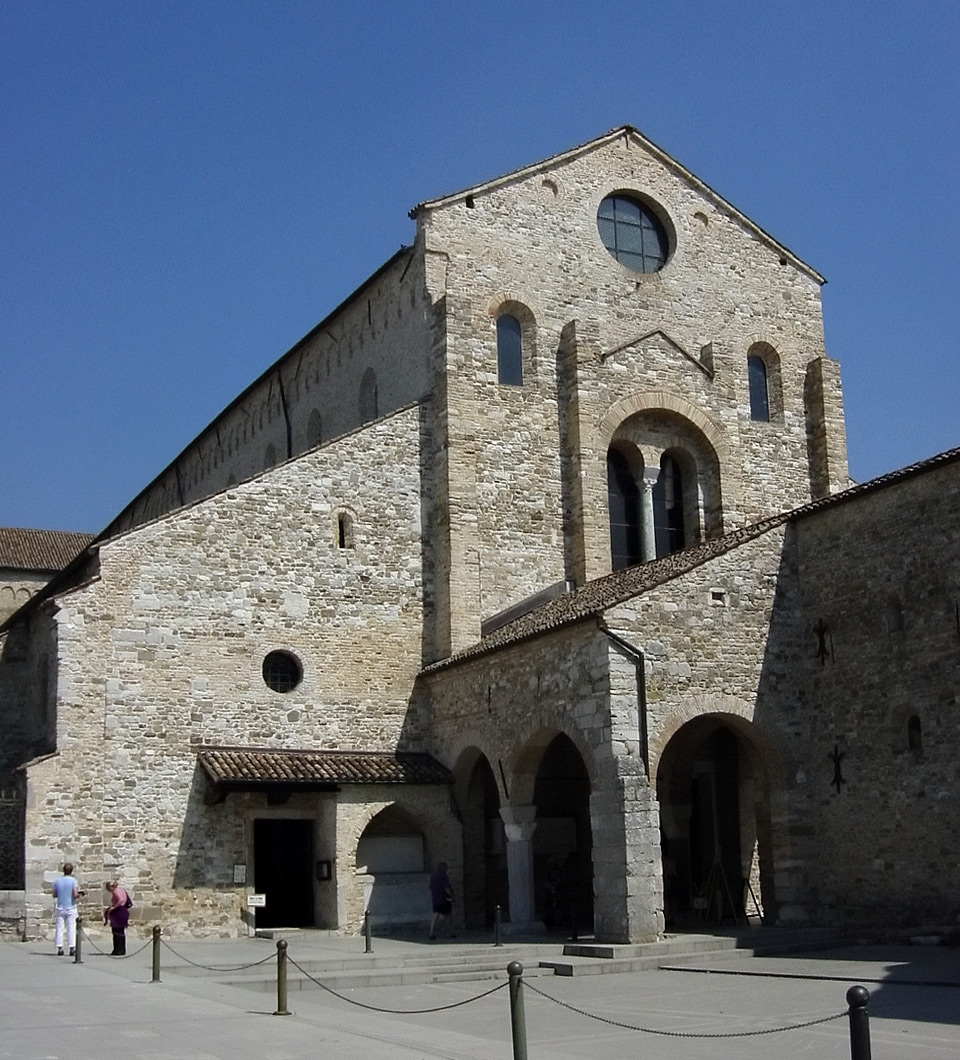
Aquileia Basilica, Italy, 11th century

A window of the 8th century, now in Venice, and carved from a single slab, has alternating tracery-like components of two tiers of four lancets separated by three oculi. Many semicircular windows with pierced tracery exist from the 6th to the 8th century, and later in Greece.

Small circular windows such as that at S. Agnese and Torcello as well as unglazed decorative circular recesses continued to be used in churches in Italy, gaining increasing popularity in the later Romanesque period.

=== The windows of Oviedo ===
In the vicinity of Oviedo in Spain are several churches of the late 9th and early 10th century which display a remarkable array of windows containing the earliest examples of roses windows outside the Byzantine Empire. The designs closely resemble the motifs found on the Byzantine relief carvings of marble sarcophagi, pulpits and well heads and pierced decorations of screens and windows of Ravenna and Constantinople. The church of San Pedro de Nora has at its apsidal end a trio of rectangular windows with pierced decoration of two overlapping circles, the upper containing a Greek cross, the window being divided by the circles and the arms of the cross into numerous sections like tracery "lights".

In another of these churches, San Miguel de Lillo, is the earliest known example of an axially placed oculus with tracery. Several such windows of different sizes exist, and decoration of both Greek Cross and scalloped petal-like form occur, prefiguring both wheel and rose windows.

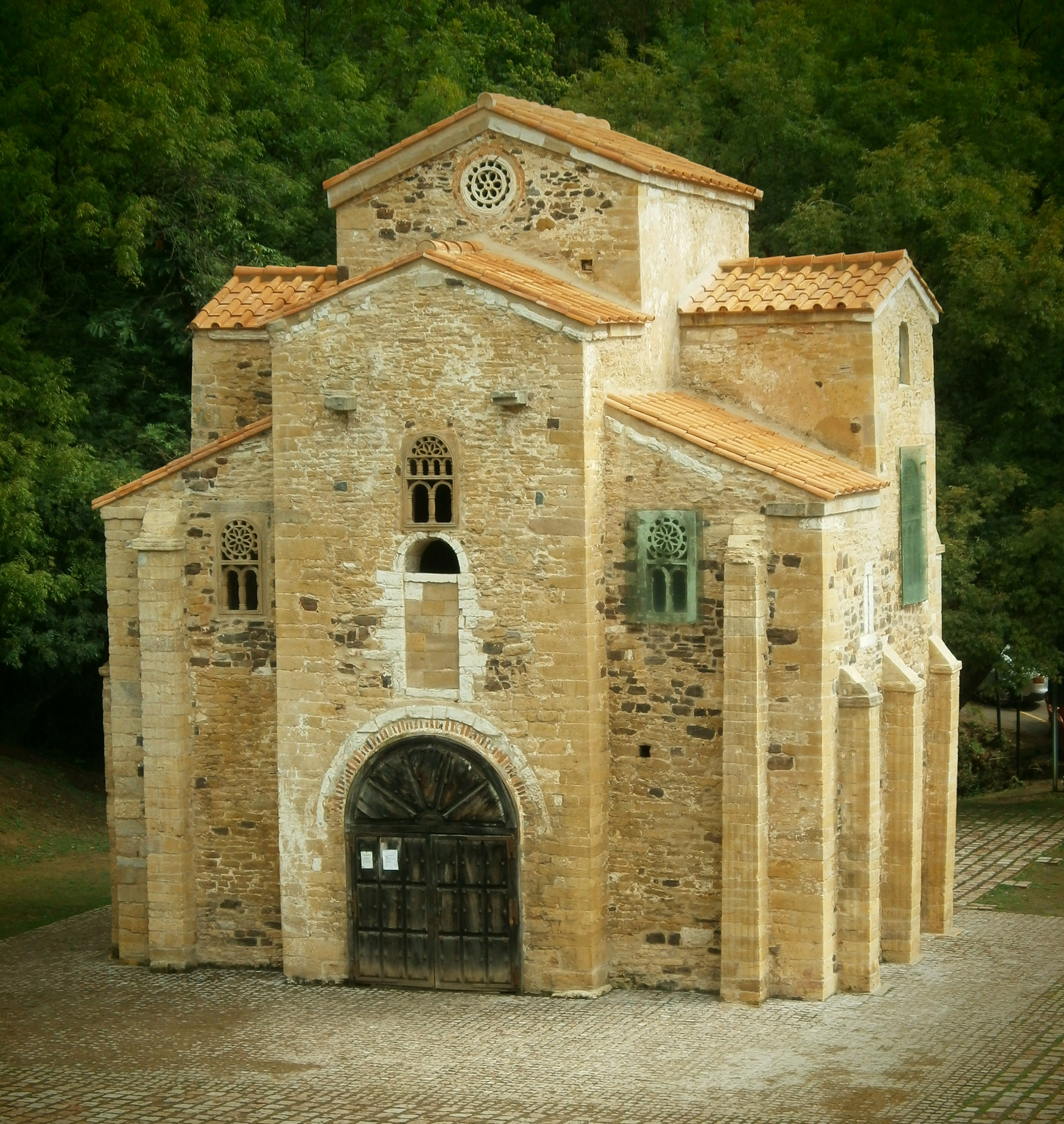
San Miguel de Lillo, Oviedo, Spain. Towards 850

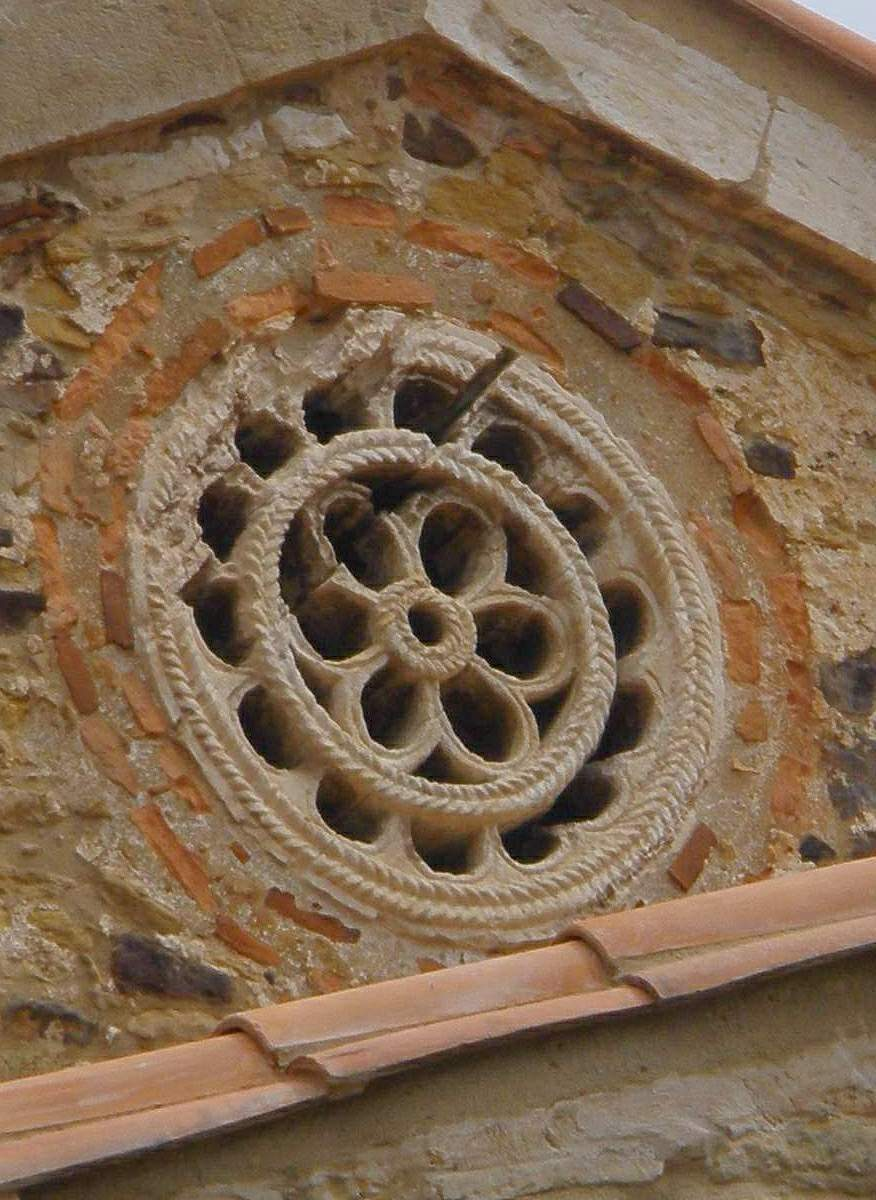
San Miguel de Lillo, detail

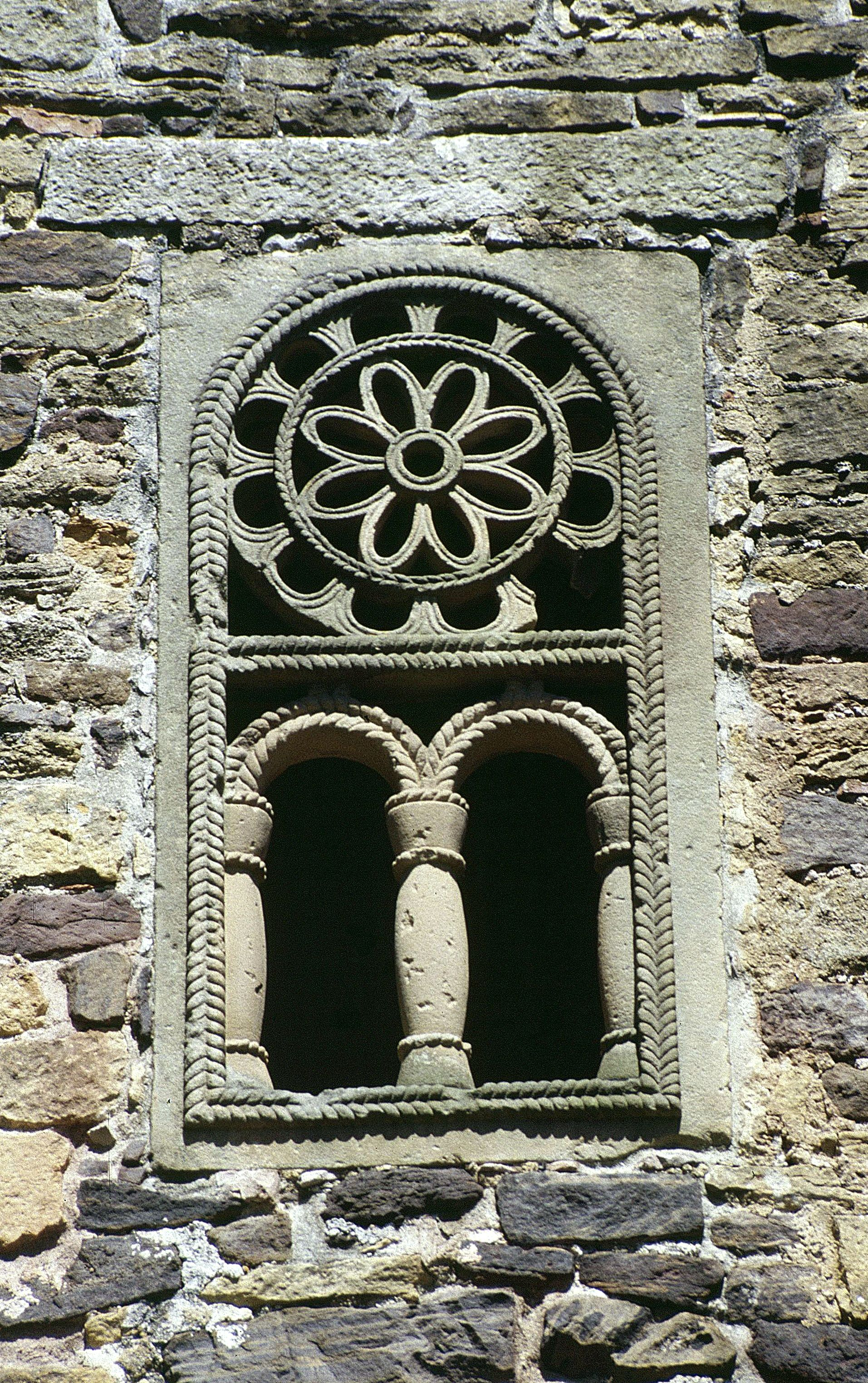
San Miguel de Lillo, detail

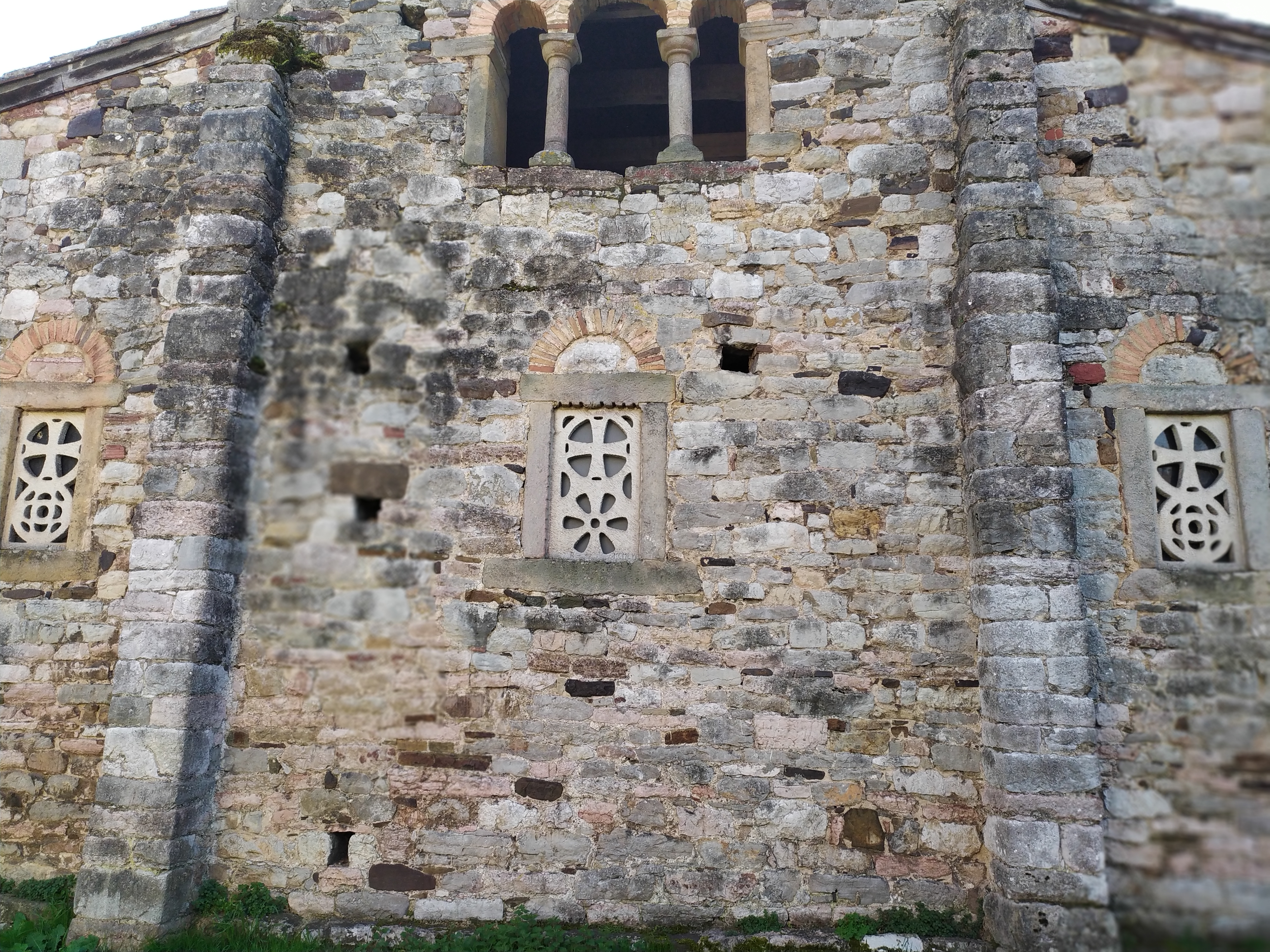
Rear of San Pedro at Nora, showing windows with double circle and Greek cross.

=== Romanesque Circular windows ===
Circular windows and decorative circular recesses are a feature of many Romanesque churches and cathedrals, particularly in Germany and Italy where the style existed for a prolonged period, overlapping the development of Gothic in France and its arrival with French architects in England.

In Germany, Worms Cathedral, has wheel windows in the pedimental ends of its nave and gables, very similar to the Early Christian Basilica of S. Agnese in Rome. The apsidal western end has a central wheel window with smaller oculi in each face. The Church of the Apostles, Cologne has an array of both ocular and lobed windows forming decorative features in the gables and beneath the Rhenish helm spire. The octagonal dome has a ring of oculi with two in each of the curved faces.

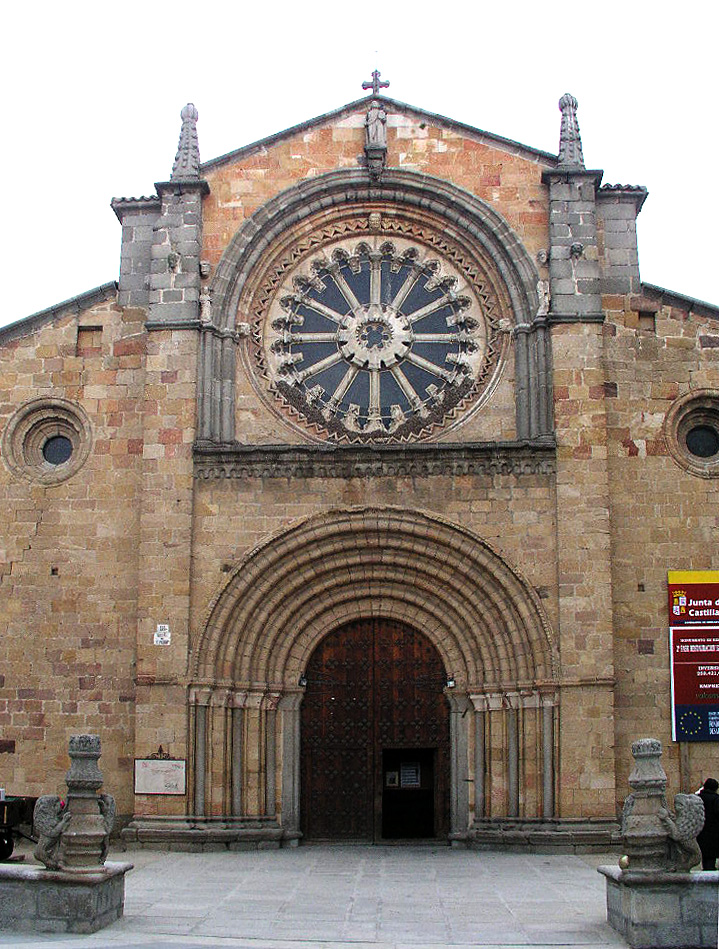
San Pedro, Ávila, Spain

In Třebíč, Czech Republic, is the 12th- and 13th-century Romanesque style Basilica of St Procopius with apsidal windows similar to those at Worms, but in this case the openings are filled with tracery of a Gothic form, clearly marking the transition to a new style.

In Italy, the use of circular motifs in various media was a feature of church facades, occurring on Early Christian, Romanesque, Gothic, Renaissance and Baroque churches, a well-known example being those great circles in polychrome marble which complement the central circular window on Alberti's Early Renaissance façade at Santa Maria Novella in Florence. Oculi were also typically used in the drums supporting domes and as upper lights in octagonal baptisteries such as that at Cremona.

Romanesque facades with oculi include San Miniato al Monte, Florence, 11th century, San Michele, Pavia, c. 1117, and Pistoia Cathedral, 1150. As the windows increased in size in the later Romanesque period, wheel windows became a standard feature of which there are fine examples at San Zeno Maggiore, Verona and Monza Cathedral.

On the Romanesque façade of Spoleto Cathedral there is a profusion of recessed and traceried oculi surrounding the central features of a rose window set within a square beneath a large mosaic of 1207.

In England there exist five Romanesque wheel windows, notably those at Barfreston and Castle Hedingham parish churches.

=== St Denis, Chartres, Mantes, Laon and Paris ===
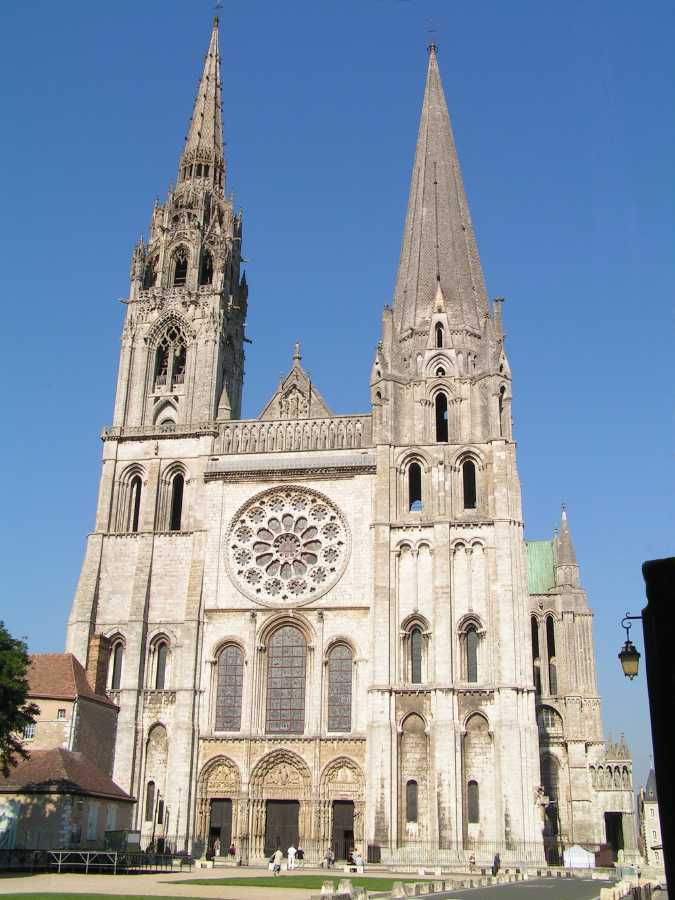
Chartres Cathedral

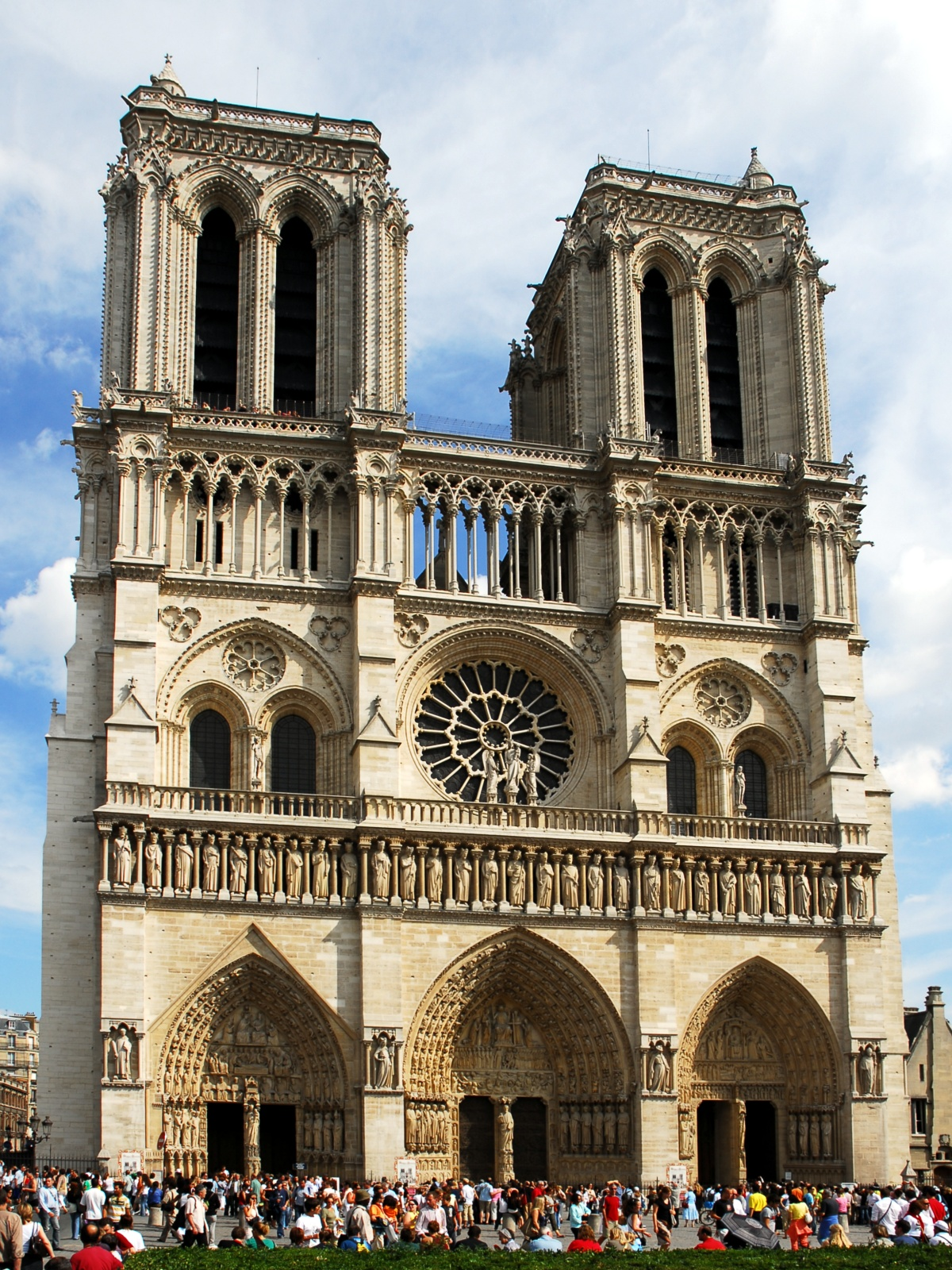
Notre Dame, Paris

The transition from the Romanesque style to the Gothic was not clear cut, even at the Abbey of St Denis, to the north of Paris, where the Abbot Suger, between 1130 and 1144, gathered the various newly emerging features of Gothic into a single building, thereby “creating” the Gothic style.

Suger's original rose window in the prototype Gothic façade of St Denis probably pre-dates many of the remaining circular windows in Romanesque buildings such as those in England, at Trebic and Spoleto and that in the façade at Speyer.

Suger's window was not distinctively Gothic in its appearance. It no longer has its original form, but a mid-19th-century drawing by the restorer Viollet-le-Duc indicates that it had a very large ocular space at the centre, the glass supported by an iron hoop, and surrounded by simple semicircular cusped lobes cut out of flat stone in a technique known as "plate tracery". The window now has Gothic tracery in it, possibly added by Viollet-le-Duc who was very concerned about the lack of stability of the whole façade, and having restored the towers, was impelled to demolish the northern one when it suddenly subsided.

Along with the simple wheel windows of the late Norman period in England, Germany and Italy, a large late 12th-century window still exists at Chartres Cathedral. This remarkable window combines a large roundel at the centre with the radiating spokes of a wheel window, surrounded by a ring of smaller “plate tracery” lights with scalloped borders. The window, depicting the Last Judgement, contains its original scheme of glazing and retains much of the original glass of 1215, despite suffering damage during World War II.

Following the west window of Chartres, more daring Gothic windows were created at the Collegiate Church of Notre-Dame in Mantes and in the dynamically sculptural facade of Laon Cathedral (which also, unusually, has a rose window in its eastern end as well as in it transept ends). These windows have large lights contained in tracery of a semicircular form, like overlapping petals.

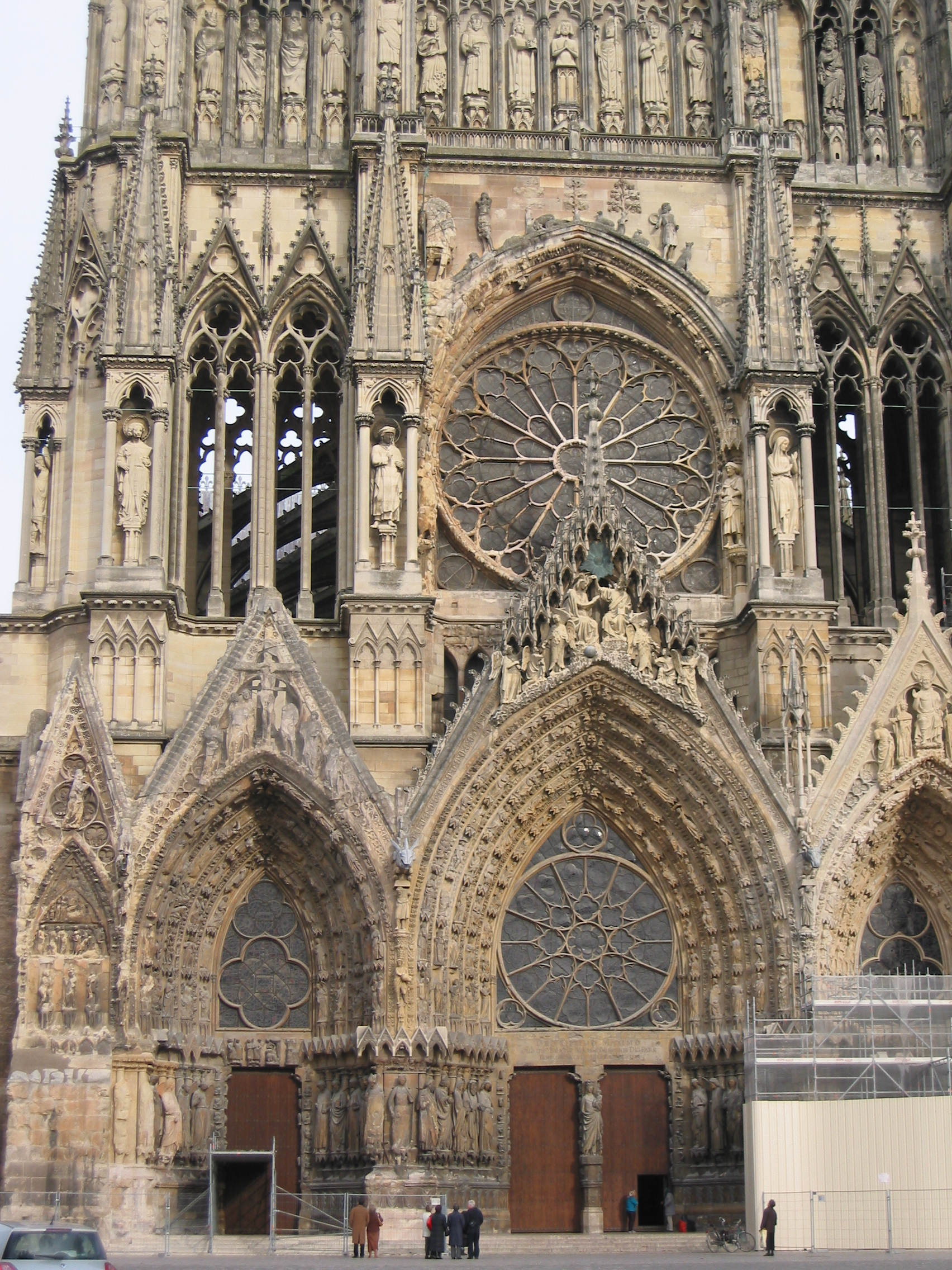
Reims Cathedral, France

The window that is central to the well-known Gothic façade of Notre Dame, Paris, is of more distinctly Gothic appearance, with mullions in two bands radiating from a central roundel, each terminating in pointed arches. It was this window, completed about 1255, that set the pattern for many other rose window including those of the transepts at St Denis and the gigantic and complex window in the south transept at Notre Dame.

At Chartres, the transepts roses follow the style of the original 12th-century rose, elaborating on the theme of contrasting forms. The south rose combines the wheel with circles and semicircles, while the north rose introduces square lights which, rotating around the centre, are all set at different angles, creating a kaleidoscopic effect of great energy.

=== Further development ===
From the building of Chartres the dimensions of the rose window began to increase with the development of more elaborate window styles associated with Gothic architecture. By the middle of the 13th century, the rose had attained the greatest possible size – the entire width of the nave or transept, as seen in the transept roses at St Denis and Paris.

In the facades of St Denis, Chartres, Mantes, Laon and Paris, the rose was put under a circular arch. The next important development in its use for the Gothic style was to put it under a pointed arch, as was done in the Notre-Dame de Reims (after 1241), in the transepts as well as in the later roses of the facade. This form probably stemmed from the now destroyed St Nicaise, also in Reims.

The rose window was often placed above a row of vertical lights as the apex of the composition, the small corner "spandrels" between the rose and lower tier being filled by smaller lights of rose form, as in the transepts of St Denis and Notre Dame.

The last step in evolution of the Gothic style was to set the rose into a tier of vertical lights, of staggered height and surmount it by a tapering pointed light so that it became the centre of a vast window composition, covering the whole end of the transepts, as in Rouen or Beauvais Cathedrals. This sort of elaborate composition can also be seen at the east end of Milan Cathedral.

Rose windows were also set into square windows, the spandrels being pierced and filled with smaller lights as at Paris, 1257, or unpierced with sculpture, the form more common in Italy as at Spoleto and also seen in the north transept of Westminster Abbey and at Strasbourg Cathedral, (see pictured above).

=== Regional examples ===
==== Australia ====
A number of Australia's cathedrals have Gothic Revival rose windows including three by William Wardell at St Mary's Cathedral, Sydney and another at St Patrick's Cathedral, Melbourne which form the upper part of a very large seven-light window in the west end.

==== Ecuador ====
Two examples of rose windows are found in the National Basilica, built in 1893 and in the Santa Teresa Church, built in 1934. The cathedral in Cuenca, in the southern Andes, has a notable rose window.

The rose window of Lancing College chapel

==== England ====
In England, the use of the rose window was commonly confined to the transepts although roses of great span were constructed in the west front of Byland Abbey and in the east front of Old St. Paul's Cathedral in London.

The cathedrals of York, Lincoln, Canterbury, Durham and Oxford feature medieval rose windows.

Medieval Beverley Minster has an example of an Early Gothic wheel window with ten spokes, each light terminating in a cusped trefoils and surrounded by decorative plate tracery.

Later windows are to be seen at the nondenominational Abney Park Chapel in London designed in 1838–40 by William Hosking FSA; Holy Trinity Church, Barnes, London; St Nicholas, Richmond; and St Albans Cathedral by George Gilbert Scott.

At Christ Church Appleton-le-Moors, Yorkshire, the 19th-century architect J.L.Pearson appears to have taken as his inspiration the regional floral symbol of the white rose. This unusual plate-tracery window dating from the 1860s has been designed with five double sections like the two-part petals of a simple rose.

The largest rose window in England is believed to be that installed in the chapel of Lancing College in 1978, with a diameter of 32 feet.

==== France ====
France has a great number of medieval rose windows, many containing ancient glass. In northern France, a rose window is usually the central feature of the facade. The transept facades commonly contain rose windows as well. Examples can be seen at Notre Dame, Paris (see left), the Basilica of Saint Denis (see left), Chartres Cathedral (see above), Reims Cathedral, Amiens Cathedral and Strasbourg Cathedral (see introductory pictures.)

==== Italy ====
In Italy, the rose window was particularly used by the Lombard architects, as in San Zeno in Verona, and in the Cathedral of Modena, and in the Tuscan Gothic churches like the Cathedrals of Siena and Orvieto. An outstanding example of a rose window is the thirteen-spoked centrepiece of the Minor Basilica in Larino, Molise (1312). Others are the Basilica of St Francis of Assisi and Santa Maria di Collemaggio (1289) in L'Aquila.

==== United States ====
The Great Rose Window over the entrance to the Cathedral Basilica of the Sacred Heart in Newark, New Jersey is the largest of any Catholic church in the Western Hemisphere.

First United Methodist Church in Lubbock, Texas, houses one of the largest rose windows at 26 1/2 feet (8.1 m) in diameter. A Baroque oculus without tracery or stained glass can be seen at San Jose Mission in San Antonio, Texas, which was founded by the Franciscan Fathers and dates from 1718 to 1731.

The largest rose window in the United States is The Great Rose Window above the main doors of the Cathedral of St. John the Divine in New York City. It is designed in the Gothic Revival style and made from more than 10,000 pieces of stained glass.

Washington National Cathedral has three large rose windows which represent the Creation, Last Judgement, and Glory of God.

In 1954, the French artist Henri Matisse created the Abby Aldrich Rockefeller Memorial Rose Window on the east wall of the Union Church of Pocantico Hills, New York.

== Symbolism ==
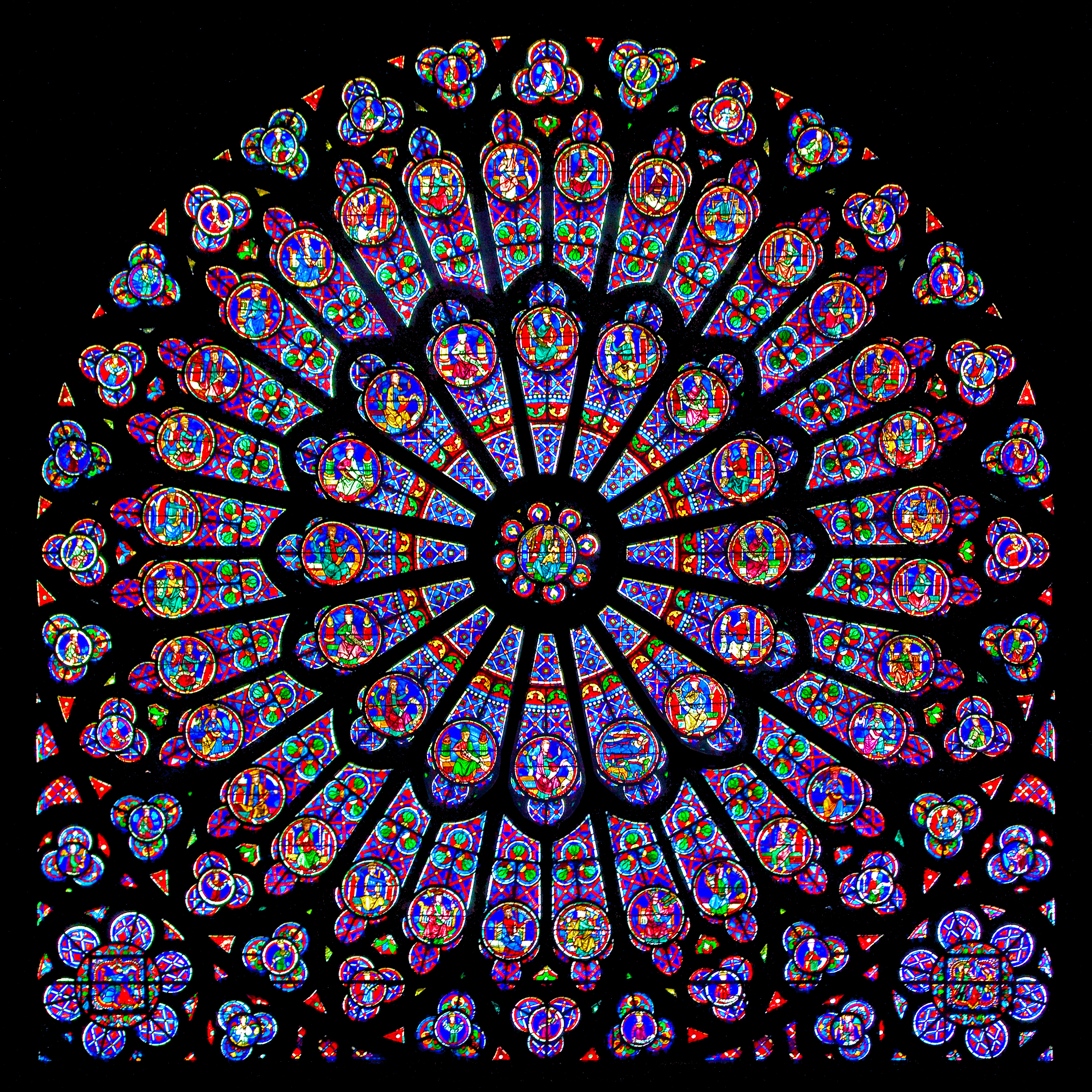
Symbolism: the north rose of Notre Dame, Paris, has at its centre the Blessed Virgin Mary and Christ Child in Majesty, surrounded by prophets and saints.

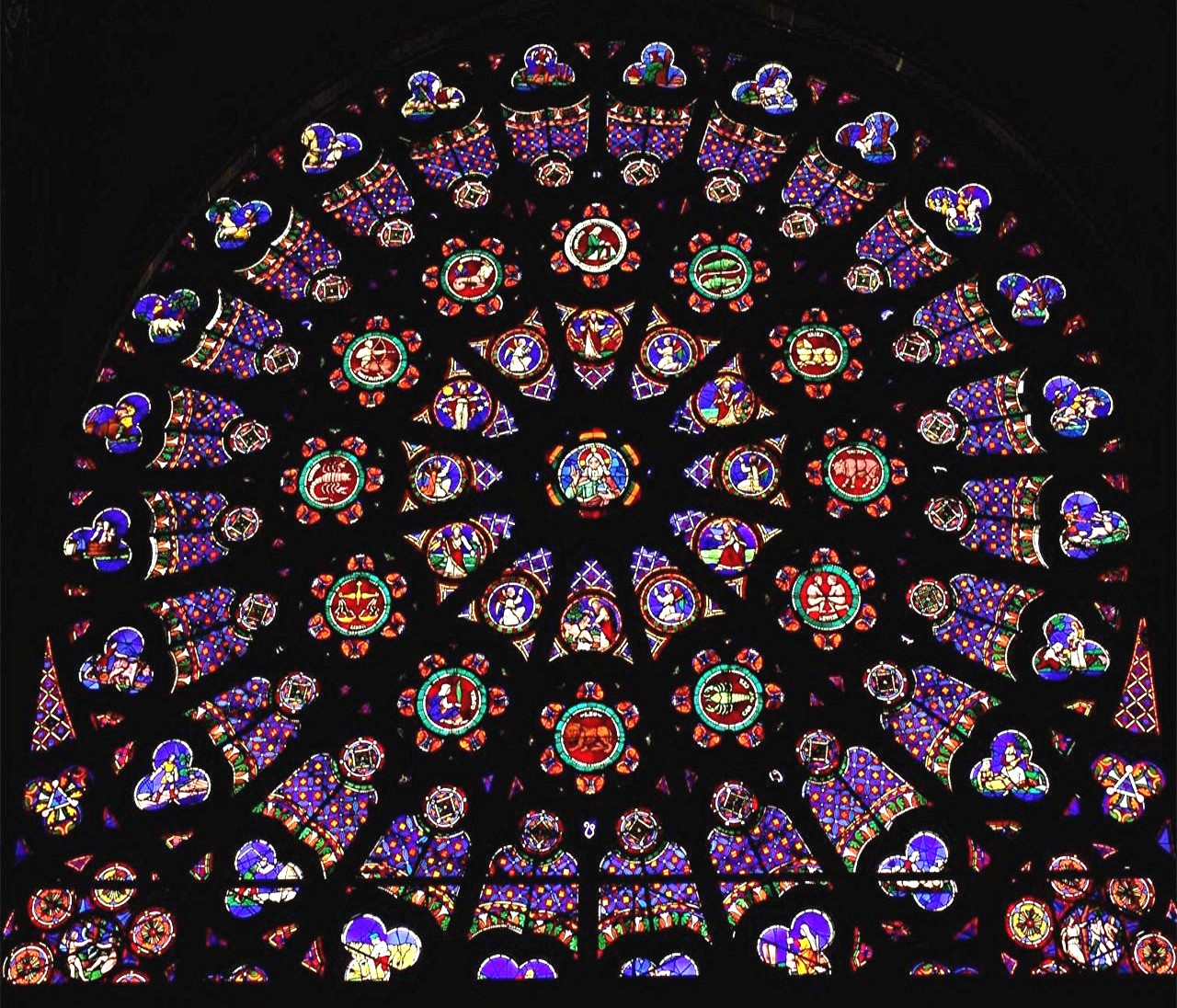
Symbolism: the north rose of the Abbey of St Denis, Paris, showing God the Creator, surrounded by the Days of Creation, the Order of the Heavens represented by the Zodiac and the Order of Earth as represented by the Labours of the Months. In the corners are the Fall of Mankind.

In Gothic cathedrals and churches, where a rose is often found above the western portal, the most common subject of the stained glass that it contains is the Last Judgement, which by a long tradition is depicted either in mural or glass on the western wall of the building. In such windows Christ is shown seated in the centre "light" and within the lights around him are the symbols of the four Gospel writers, Apostles, Prophets, Saints and Angels. Some windows show God's dominion over Heaven and Earth by including Zodiacal signs and Labours of the Months.

When rose windows are used in the transept ends, then one of those windows is frequently dedicated to Mary as the Mother of Jesus. In modern Catholic thought, the rose window is often associated with the Virgin Mary because one of her titles, referred to by St Bernard of Clairvaux, is the "Mystical Rose". However, the specific association of Mary with the rose window is unlikely during the Medieval period, because the term "rose window" was not coined until the 17th century, a time when few such windows were being constructed. However, with the revival of the Gothic style in the 19th and 20th centuries, much stained glass that was installed in rose windows, both in new churches and as restoration in old churches, was dedicated to the Virgin Mary.

== Timeline ==
Note: The styles below refer to the architectural advancements that occurred in the evolution of the Rose window.

- Origin of the overall concept is thought to have come from Roman oculus
  - Example(s):
    - Pantheon, Rome (Built 113–125 AD)
  - Roman mosaic were common for rose patterns.

=== Early Christian (260–525 AD) ===
- Oculi style
  - Often used in France and Italy at this time.
  - Roughly only 6 feet in diameter.
  - Some were elaborately decorated with carved ornament and symbols of the Evangelist. Also it was common for them to be decorated with images of lions, bulls, eagles, and angels. With that being said, most had little-to-no decoration.
  - The most important identifying thing about the oculi style was that a technically, in the traditional sense, wasn't a window. This was due to the fact that, there was no glass separating the inside of the building from the outside. Sometimes they would have metal grate bars in them.
  - The belief of the purpose and use, was to have natural light within the structures.
  - Example(s):
    - Chapel of Burj Heidar (298 AD)
    - Church of the Holy Sepulchre (335 AD)

=== Byzantine (330–1453 AD) ===
- Oculi style
  - Example(s):
    - Saint-Généroux (950 AD)
      - Created later in the Byzantine period, it was heavily influenced by the Romanesque period that was just about to flourish.
- Other speculation of its origins, is that it comes from the six-lobed rosettes and octagon, that decorate Hisham's Palace (Built 740–750 AD)
- In 848, the earliest known example of an axially placed oculus with tracery became San Miguel de Lillo.
- During the 6th–8th century, semicircular windows were thought to have existed.
- In Spain, the Oviedo vicinity, has some of the earliest examples of rose windows outside of the Byzantine Empire. (9th – early 10th century)

=== Romanesque (1000–1150 AD) ===
- Oculi style
  - Example(s):
    - Cefalù Cathedral (12th century AD)
- Small circular windows were common, and very popular of this period.
  - The reason for this, was the poor architectural advancements at the time. At this point, the heavy stone material that was favored could only support small windows.
- Many speculate that the rose window came from the Wheel a Fortune from the northern facade of a, Saint-Étienne, Beauvais in 1072.
- Wheel window style
  - The wheel window style refers to when architects started to putting glass within the oculi structure creating an actual window. This was due to when architects tried increasing the diameter of the oculi to let in more light, the problem of wind and rain became very apparent.
  - They became the standard for the rose window, becoming the base of which other styles that would be created.
  - Example(s):
    - Worms Cathedral (1110 AD)
    - Saint-Etienna, Beauvais (1150 AD)
    - Castle Hedingham churches
- Plate tracery style
  - “Tracery” refers to the pattern within the window itself. Over the course of time tracery will evolve and change into three different distinct patterns: geometric, flower, and flame.
  - “Plate” refers to a technique that came about in the 5th and 6th century in Syria, where when carving designs, an artist would take a single flat slab or piece of stone and carve one complete design with it.
  - Example(s):
    - Strasbourg Cathedral (1015–1439 AD)
- Consider to be the first Gothic church, the Abbey Church of Saint-Denis, was completed in 1144 AD, as the Gothic period was beginning. It also is the first known church to have stained glass rose windows around 1200 AD
- The first rose windows that used dividing pieces and adornments first appeared basically at the same time in Italy at San Zeno at Verona, in Tuscany and in France at Saint-Denis and Saint-Etienne at Beauvais. At this time it was just as much of a useful structure tailored for interior drama as it was for exterior decoration.
- Rose windows gained major popularity in the middle of the 12th century.

=== Early Gothic (around 1150–1250 AD) ===
- The Gothic period is considered to be the birthplace of the “true” traditional rose window.
- Plate tracery style
  - Example(s):
    - Notre-Dame de Paris (1163–1345 AD)
      - Notre-Dame was considered a great architectural accomplishment in many ways including the rose window. The west rose window is nearly 33 ft in diameter with a spider web like frame for great support. It also has one of the highest ratio of glass and stone of any other rose window.
      - In 1225 Notre-Dame began modifications on its fourth story, instead of a triforium there were rose-shaped oculi which projected light onto the roof.
    - The Collegiate Church of Mantes which was similar in design but smaller in scale also used oculi windows for lighting.
    - Lincoln Cathedral (1185–1311 AD)
- Around the Gothic period the style of window, took a turn from the “wheel” like shape to a more complex flowering shape.
- Although, it cannot be known for sure when the rose window got its name, the naming of the window is thought to have occurred around the early 13th century.
- It is believed that the increase in popularity of the Virgin Mary is linked to the rose windows getting their name and gaining favor as well.
- A product already have been invented in the Middle Ages, stained glass only had appeared in the rose window at the Abbey Church of Saint-Denis. However, it started to become more popular around the earlier part of the 1200s, often the money for the glass, being donated by the wealthy.
  - The glass had a tenancy to be dark and rich with color.
  - The most common color combination was blue and red color patterns.
- Bar tracery style
  - Bar tracery allowed for more glass to be used in the windows, creating a more visually stunning piece of artwork.
  - In 1211, Reims Cathedral became known for being the first Gothic cathedral to use bar tracery with rose windows.
- Besides, showing up later in Rhenish art around 1200, the circular window was almost never used in Romanesque architecture and never considered to be important for lighting.
- Early Gothic style
  - Example(s):
    - Laon Cathedral (12th–13th centuries AD)
      - 1180–90 marked the date for the two transept large rose windows which were made up of several juxtaposed multi-foils. These stood out in particular for their importance in interior lighting.
      - Around 1205 the Laon Cathedral's choir was upgraded to also house a large rose window which was subdivided by mullions (slender dividing bars). Along with some other tall windows this was considered one of the greatest examples of Gothic art from the early 13th century.
- From the 12th until the early 13th century, The Last Judgement became a popular theme in rose windows.
- Rayonnant Gothic style
  - This began the revolution of rose windows, in the sense that no Gothic church or cathedral, was complete without one. Rose Windows became a standard part of Gothic architecture. With the overwhelming desire to have rose windows everywhere, came the mixed reviews of craftsmanship and design, compared to the ones of previous eras.
  - The style is probably most known for its emphasis on more glass being shown in the rose windows.
- Curvilinear style
  - Origin are from England.
  - Compared to previous styles, the Curvilinear style is considered to be one of the more abstract, unconventional, design interpretations of the rose window.
  - Example(s):
    - Boyton in Wiltshire (13th century AD)
- Flamboyant Gothic style
  - The name refers to the flame like form and design within the patterned tracery.
  - Example(s):
    - Sainte-Chapelle (1242–1248 AD)
    - Sens Cathedral (1490)
      - One of the most exquisite examples of flamboyant style mastered by Martin Chambige.
    - Beauvais Cathedral (1500)
      - Also created by Chambiege and while it is visually spectacular it is not executed as well.

=== High Gothic (around 1250–1375 AD) ===
- First started in France and around 1260, spread across Europe. The Gothic period was considered to be a "golden age" of architecture.
- There are many things that cause the rose window to spread so rapidly across Europe, such as...
  - The increase in the authority of religion.
  - The growth of the economy at the time.
- The designing of the intricate framework of the rose windows had two basic principles of design during this period:
  - Ad Quadratum
  - "Right Measure" or "Two to One"
- The use of voids in the geometrical designing a rose windows is a defining difference between Rayonnant and Famboyant styles.
- Practically every rose window contains at least one star. The star can be literal or it can be implied in the design work.
- The tree of Jesus was a popular theme in rose windows through the 12th–13th centuries.
- Curvilinear style
- Plate tracery style
- Bar tracery style
- Rayonnant Gothic style
  - Example(s):
    - Notre-Dame de Paris (1163–1345 AD)
- Flamboyant Gothic style
  - Example(s):
    - Lincoln Cathedral (1185–1311 AD)
    - Beauvais Cathedral (1272 AD)
    - Amiens Cathedral (13th century AD)

=== International Gothic (around 1375–1450 AD) ===
- Stained glass at this point in time was beginning to be much more painterly.
  - To create a lighter and area feel, colors such as yellows and greens were often used.
- Plate tracery style
- Bar tracery style
- Rayonnant Gothic style
- Flamboyant Gothic style

=== Early and High Renaissance (around 1400–1550 AD) ===
- This period is marked by the increase in longitude storytelling with narrative images.
- Although, later many were removed in the 19th century, the zodiac symbol also became a recurring design element in rose windows at this time.
- Oculi style
  - Example(s):
    - Pazzi Chapel (1429–1443 AD)
- Renaissance style
  - This began the break of the Gothic style and instead started the renewal of the Classical art style.
  - A defining characteristic about the Renaissance style is the use of ferramenta instead of stone tracery.
  - Creating abstract figures within rose windows was particularly prevalent at this time.
  - Example(s):
    - Seville Cathedral (1536 AD)
- Plate tracery style
- Bar tracery style
- Rayonnant Gothic style

=== Baroque (1600–1725 AD) ===
- Baroque style
  - Common with this style, was the use of circular, oval, and organic complex shapes; not just circular shapes.

=== Neoclassical (1760–1830 AD) ===
- Oculi style

=== The Revival (mid-19th–20th centuries AD) ===
- This was a time of restoring, recreating, and creating cathedrals, inspired by older designs.
- This phenomenon spread across Europe being particularly prevalent in Britain, France, and Germany.
- Plate Tracery style
- Bar Tracery style
- Wheel Window style
- Flamboyant Gothic style
- Renaissance style
- Rayonnant Gothic style
  - Rose pattern tracery was very popular.

=== Modern (1860–1970s AD) ===
- It is speculated that the Modern period of rose windows is a continuation of the Revival period previous.
- Modern style
  - The rose design itself would often be interpreted very abstractly with stained glass as well as new types of glass such as dalle de verre.

== Galleries ==
=== Gallery showing stone mullions and tracery ===
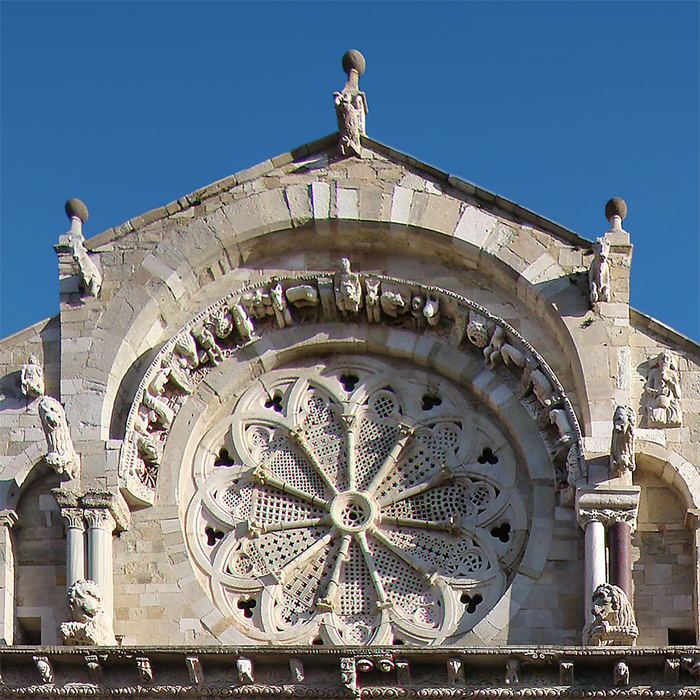
Italy, Troia, Cathedral of Santa Maria Assunta (1093–1125)

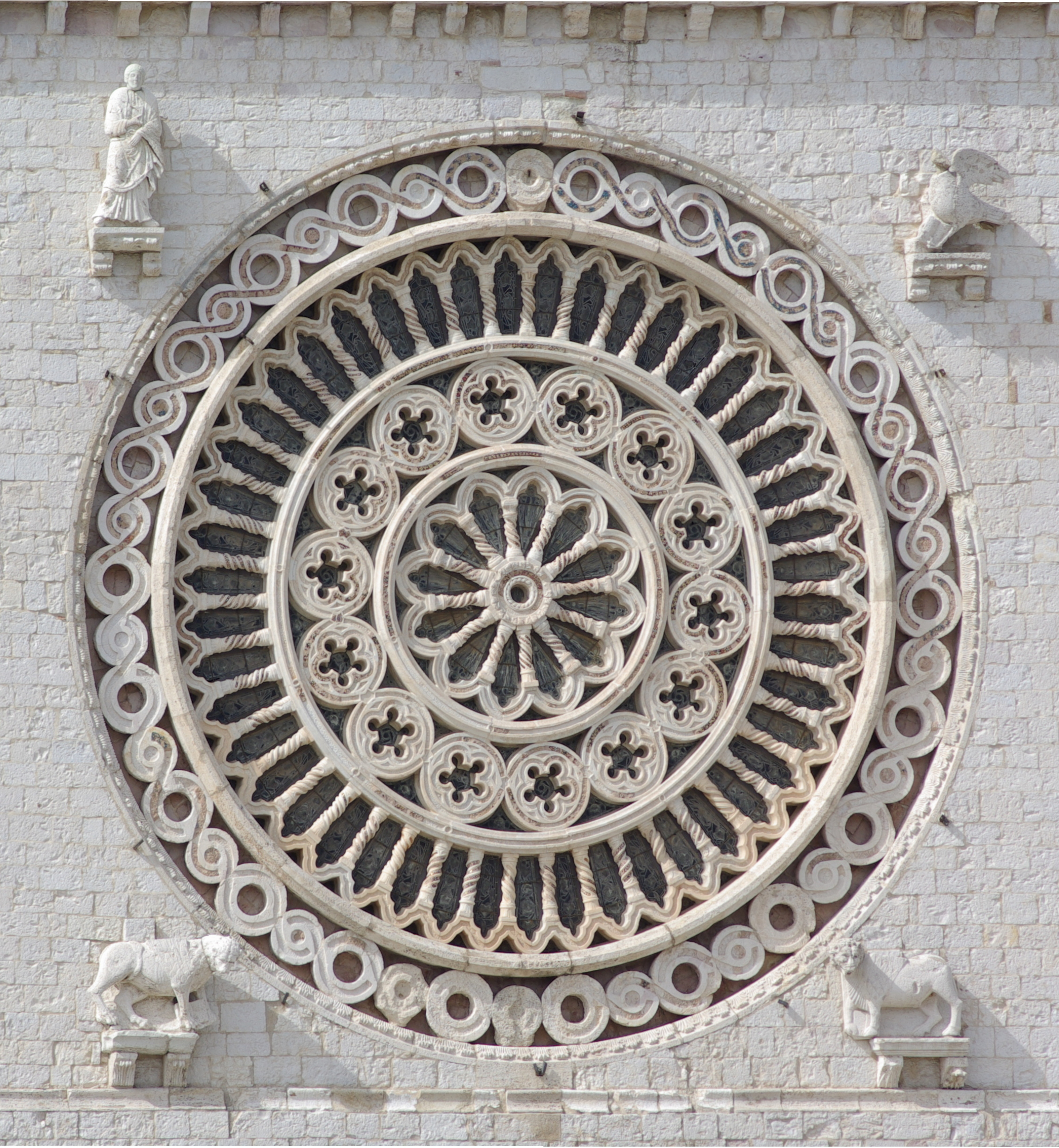
Italy, Basilica of San Francesco d'Assisi (1228–1253)

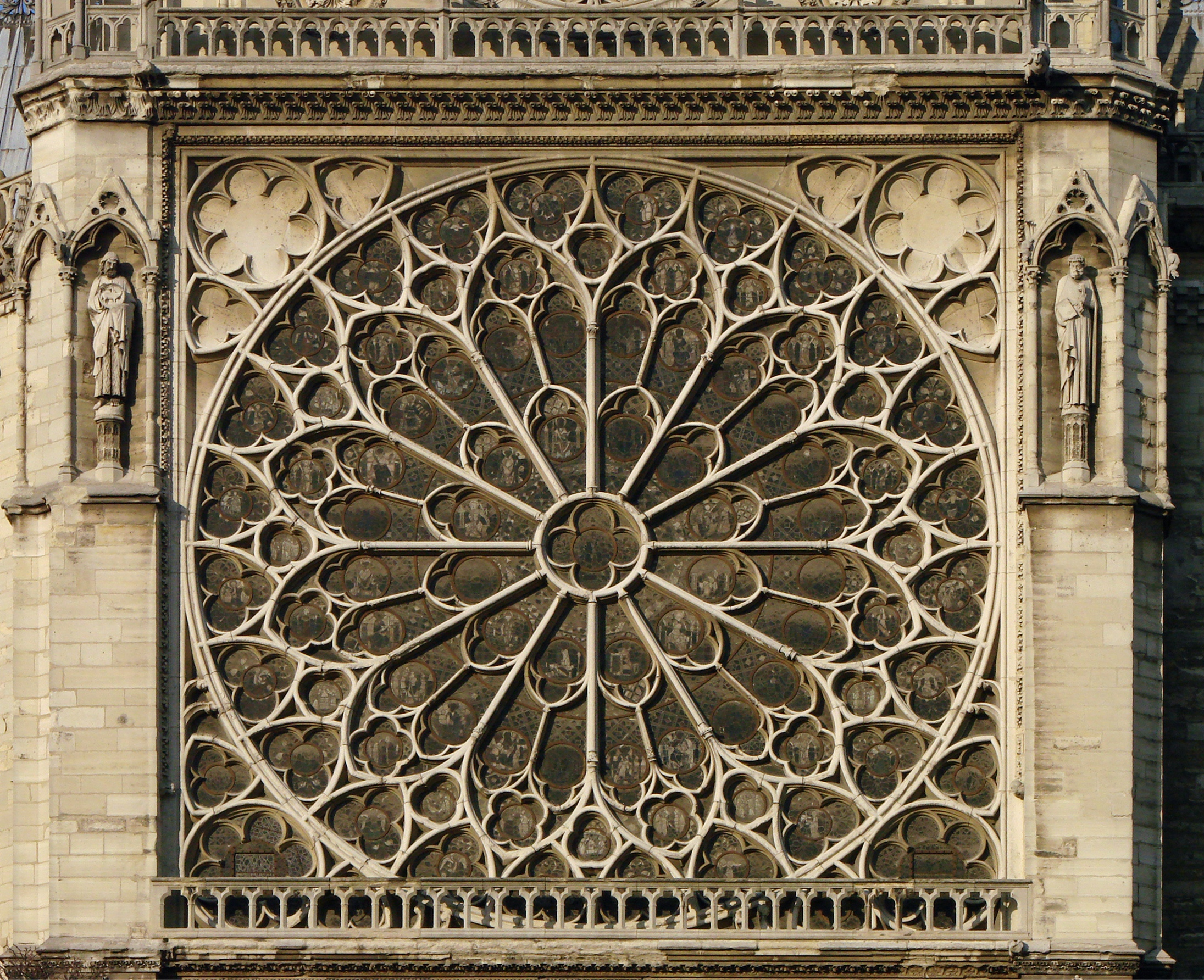
France, Notre-Dame de Paris (1250–1260)

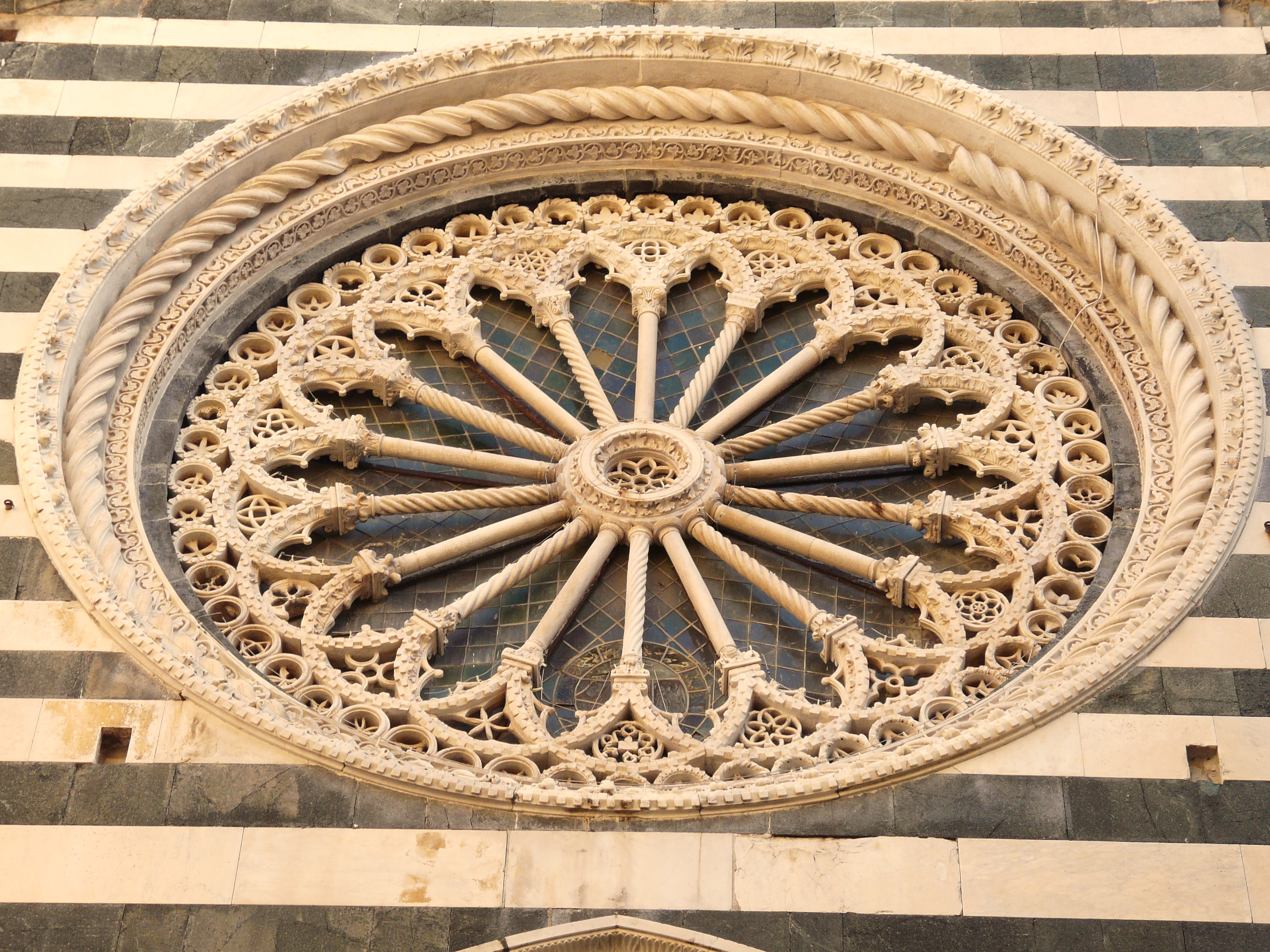
Italy, Monterosso al Mare, Church of St. John the Baptist (1282–1307)

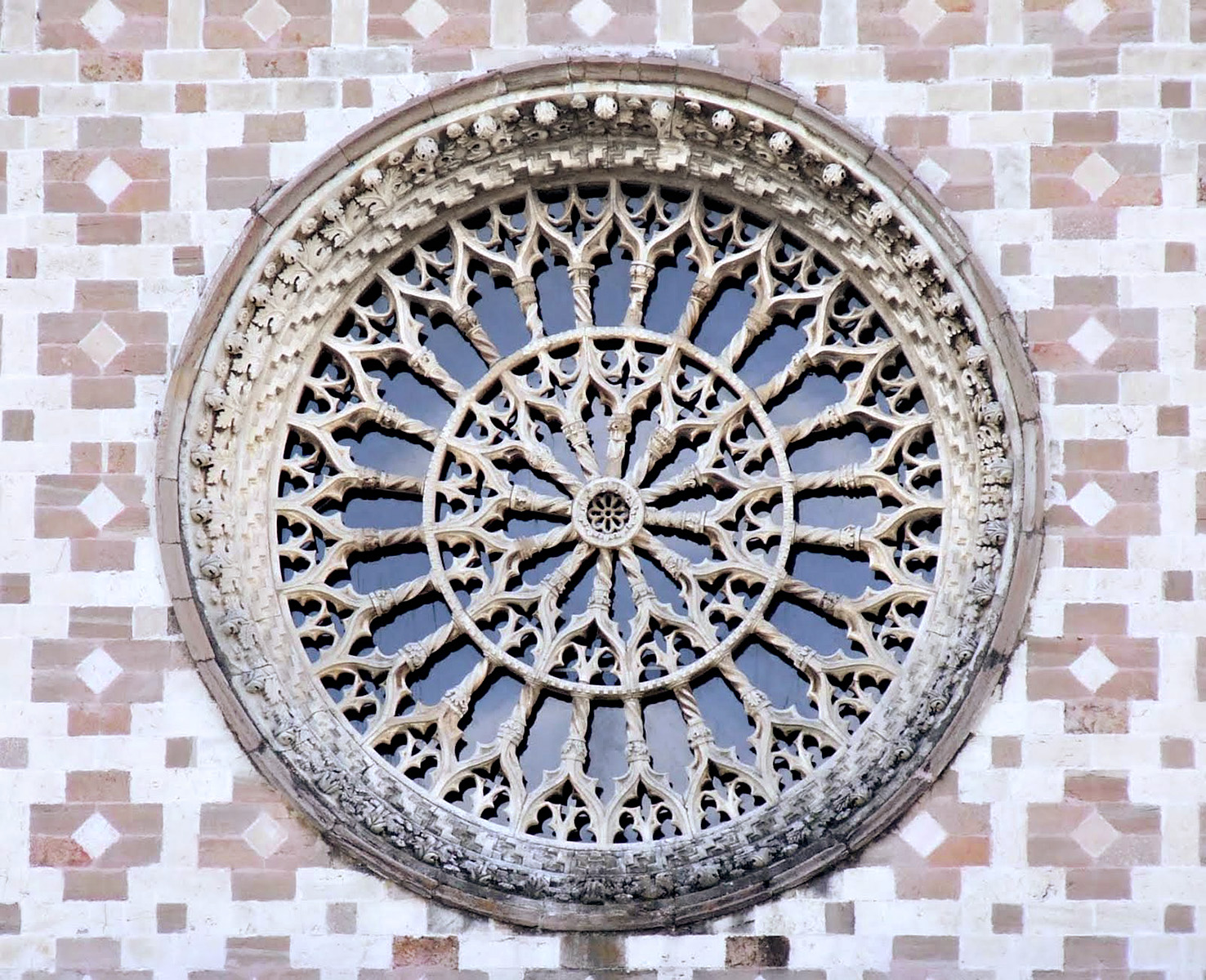
Italy, L'Aquila, Basilica of Santa Maria di Collemaggio (1287)

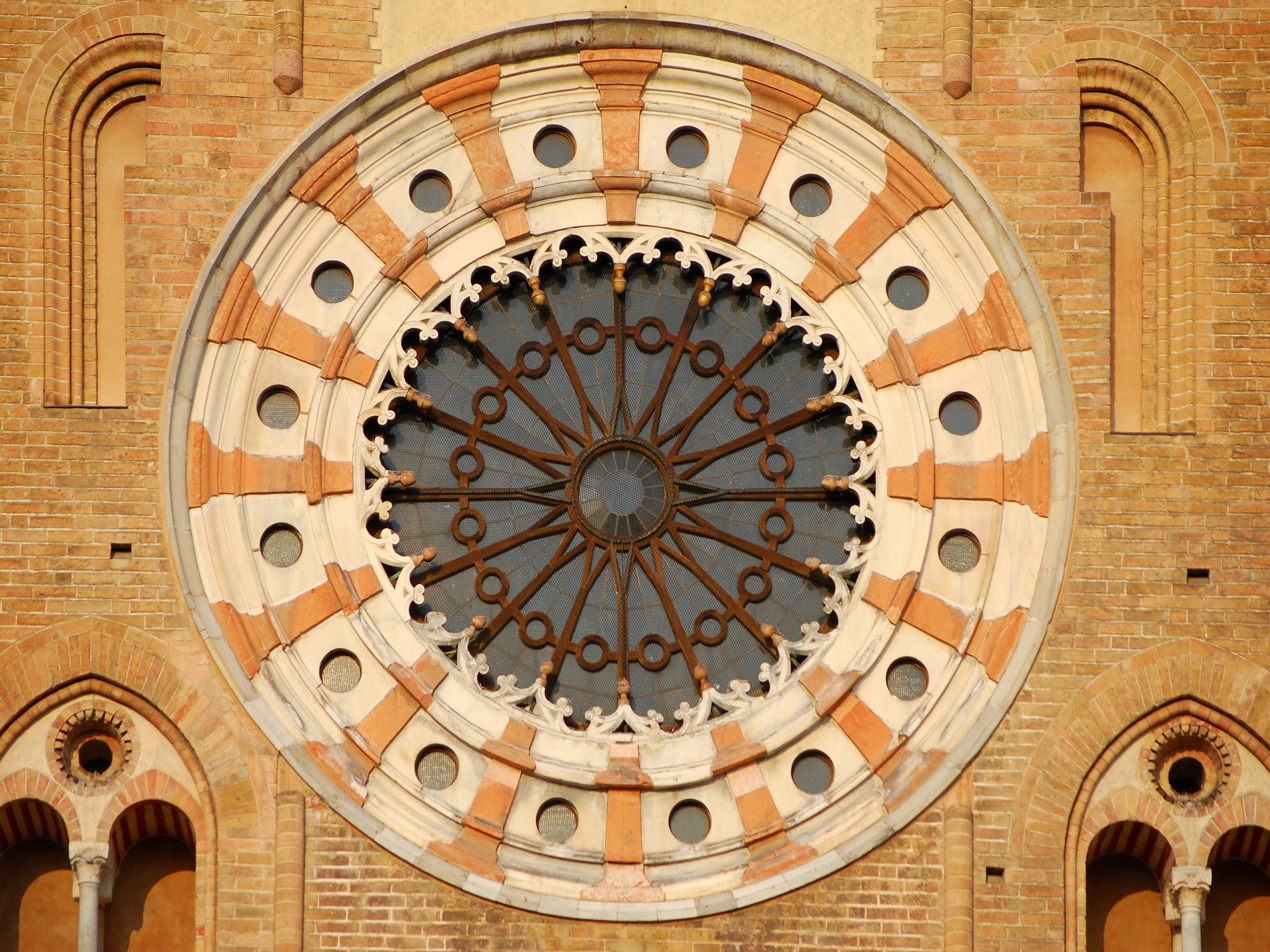
Basilica Cathedral of Lodi, Italy

=== Gallery showing stained glass ===
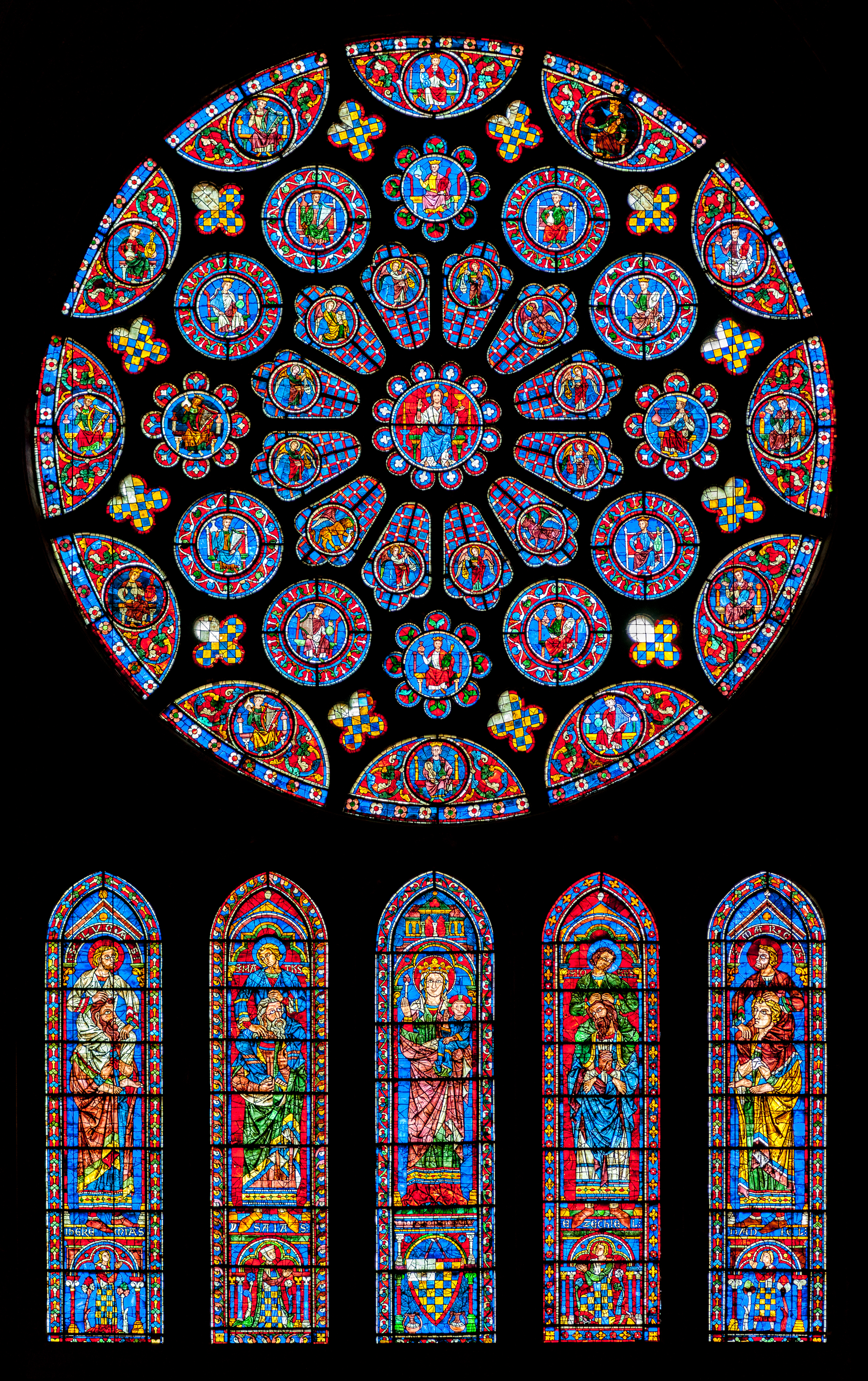
France, Chartres Cathedral, ancient transept window

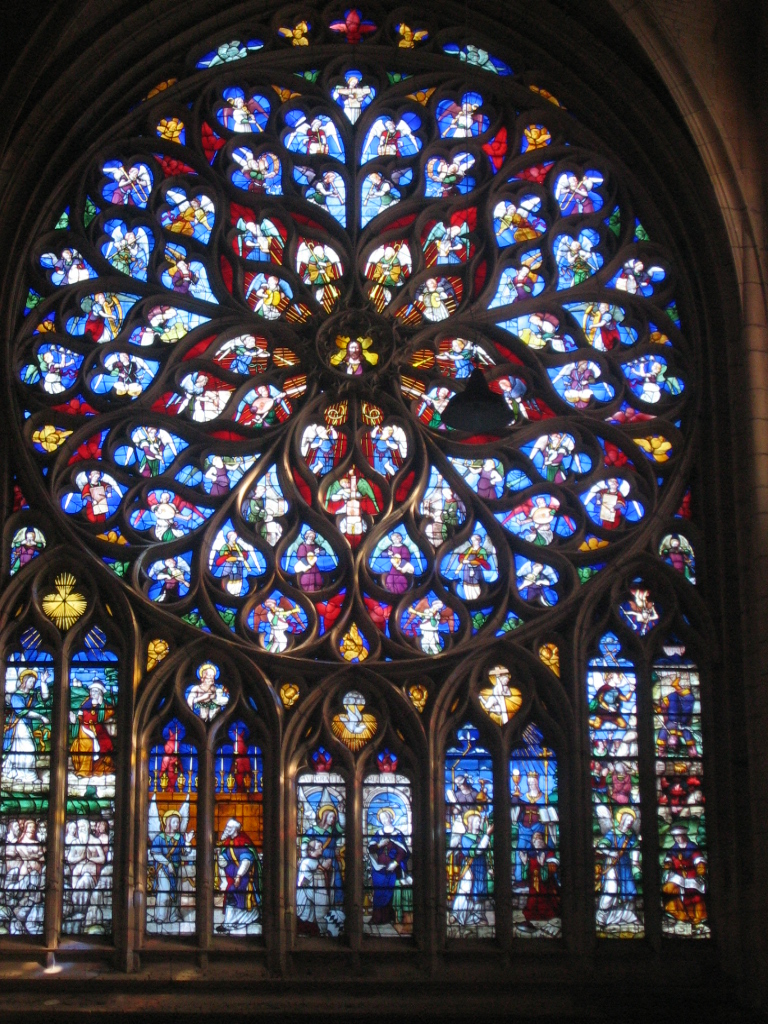
France, Sens Cathedral, transept, showing Flamboyant window incorporated into a large composition

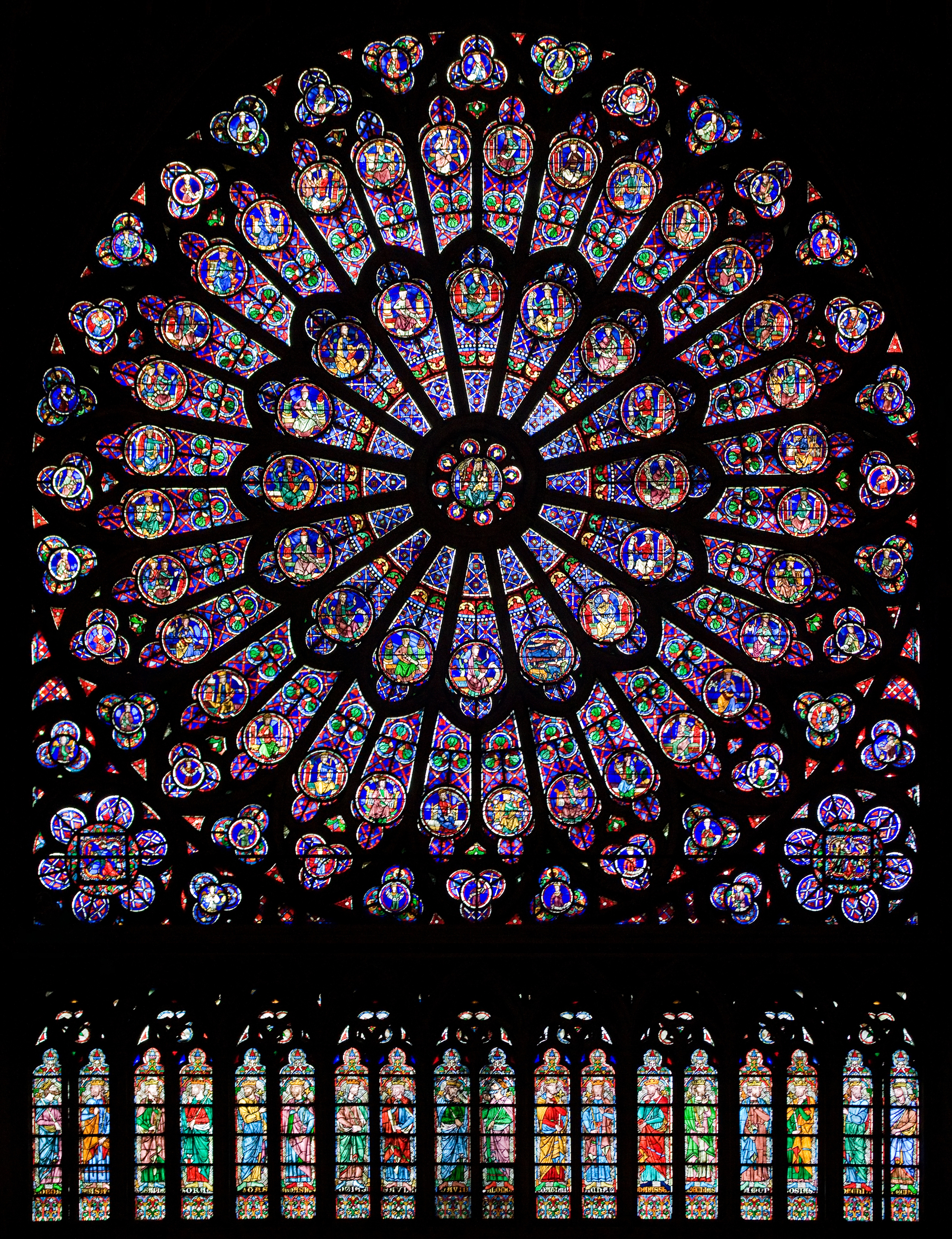
Notre-Dame de Paris, France, north transept

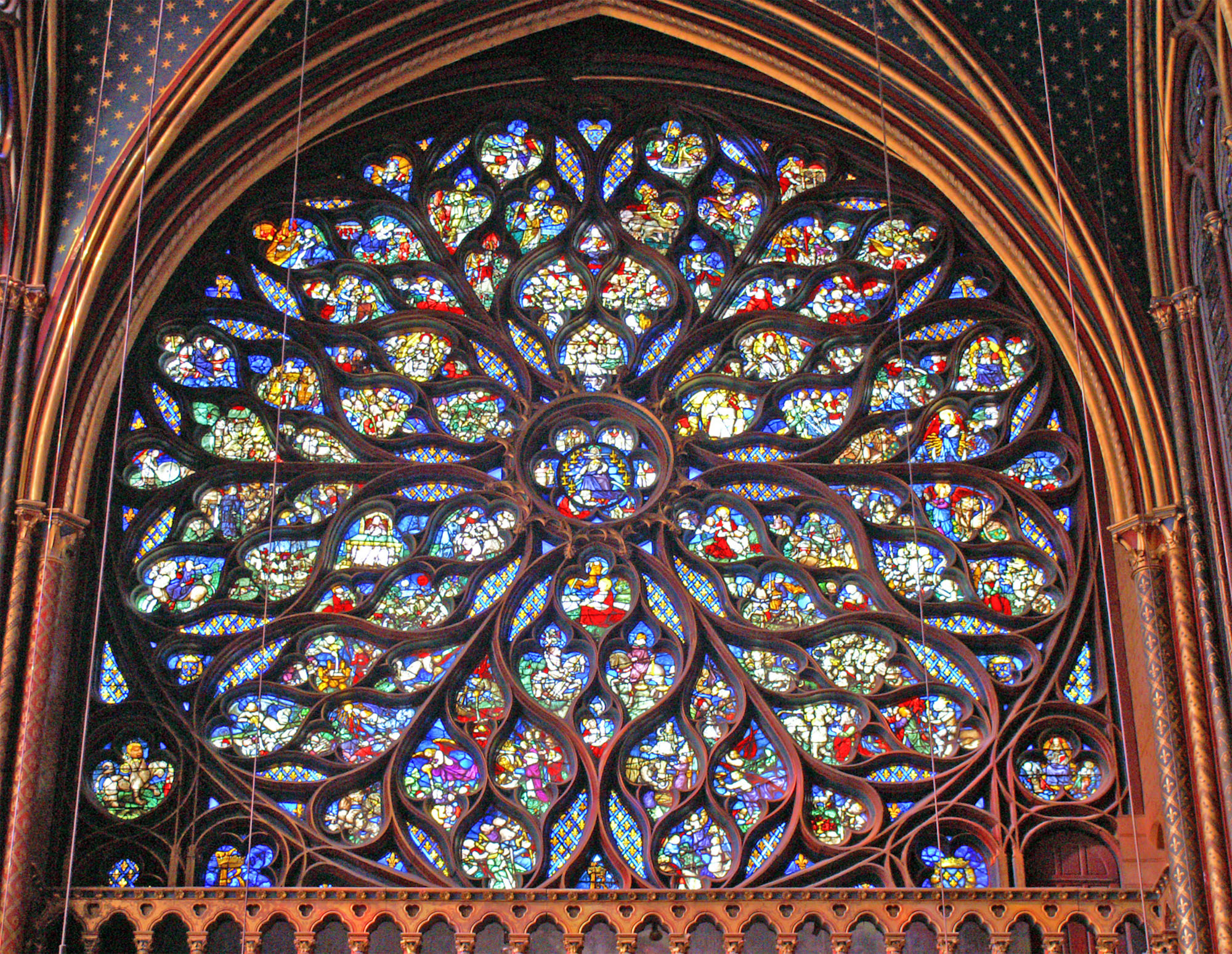
France, Sainte-Chapelle, Paris, the Apocalypse in Flamboyant tracery

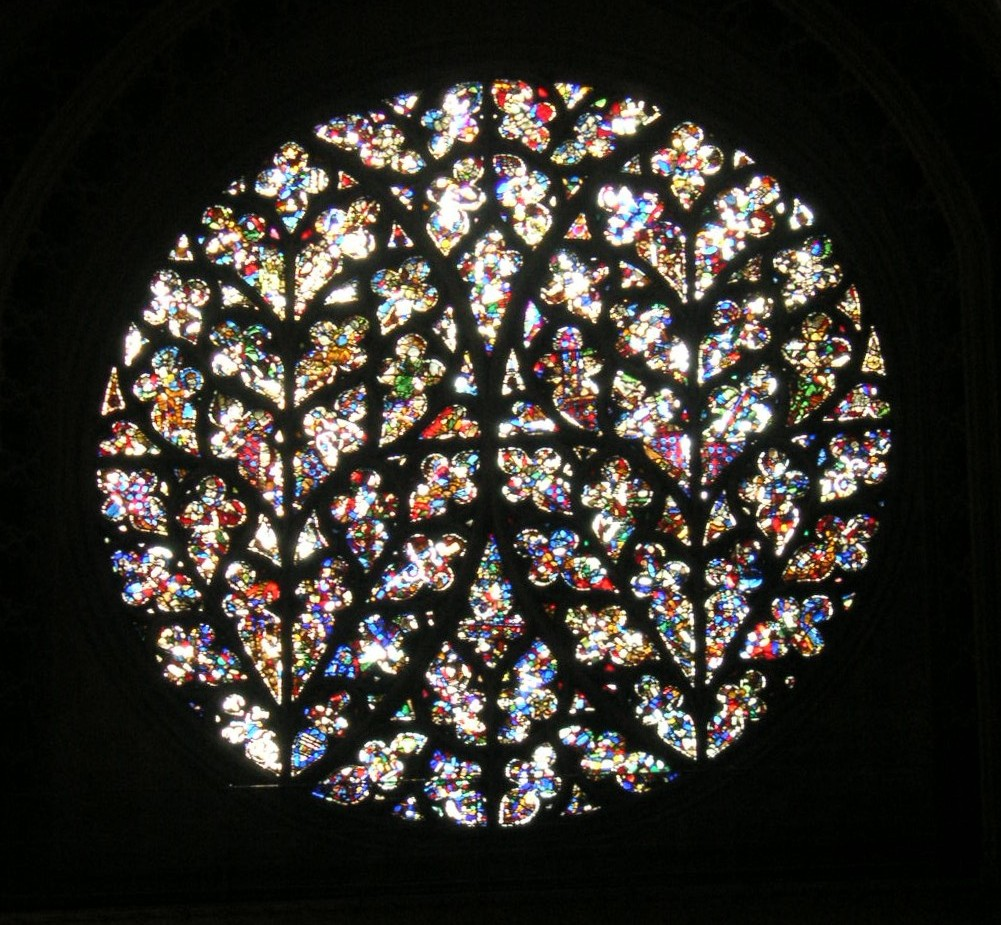
England Lincoln Cathedral, the Bishop's Eye. Fragments of ancient glass in a Flowing Gothic window

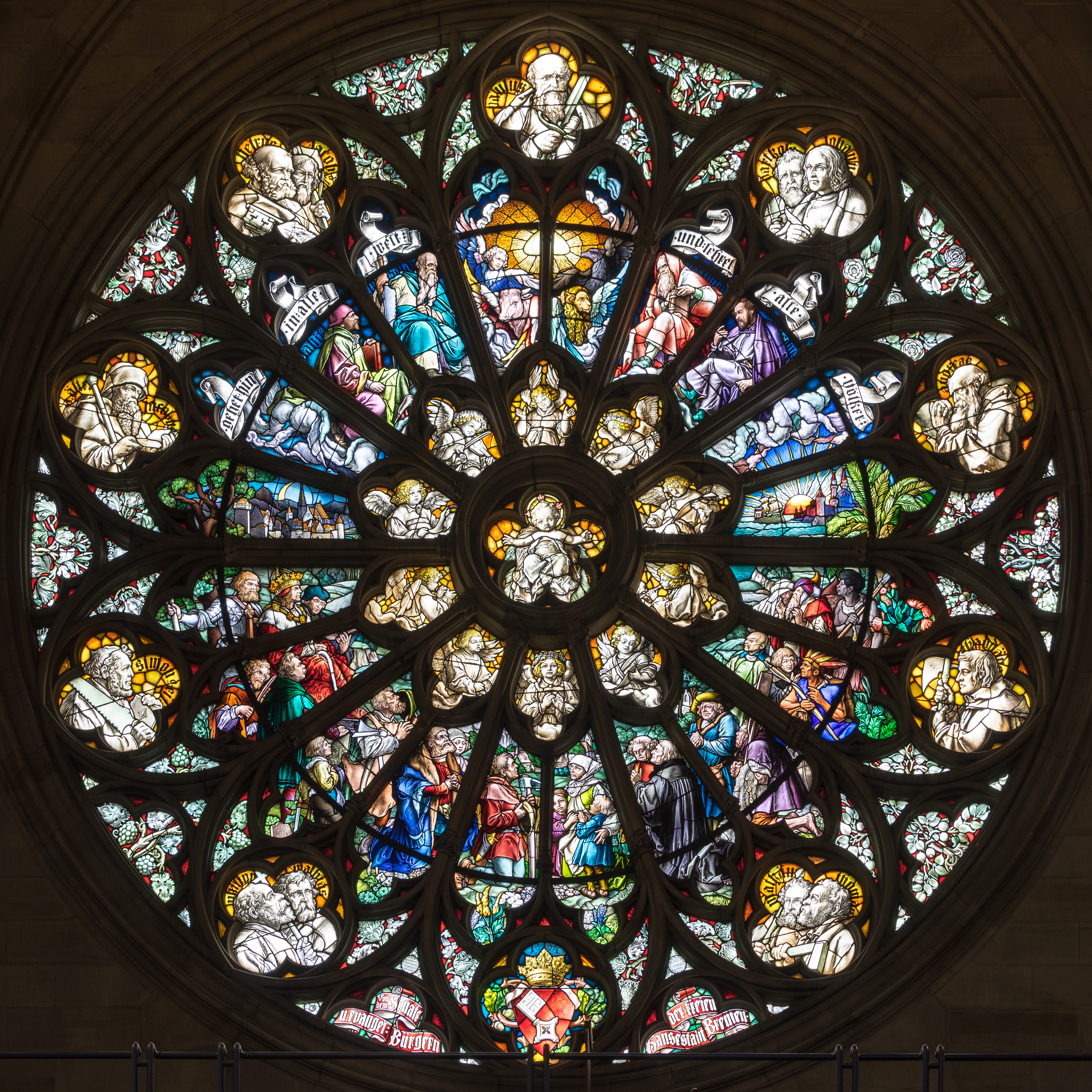
Germany, Memorial Church (Gedaechtniskirche), Speyer

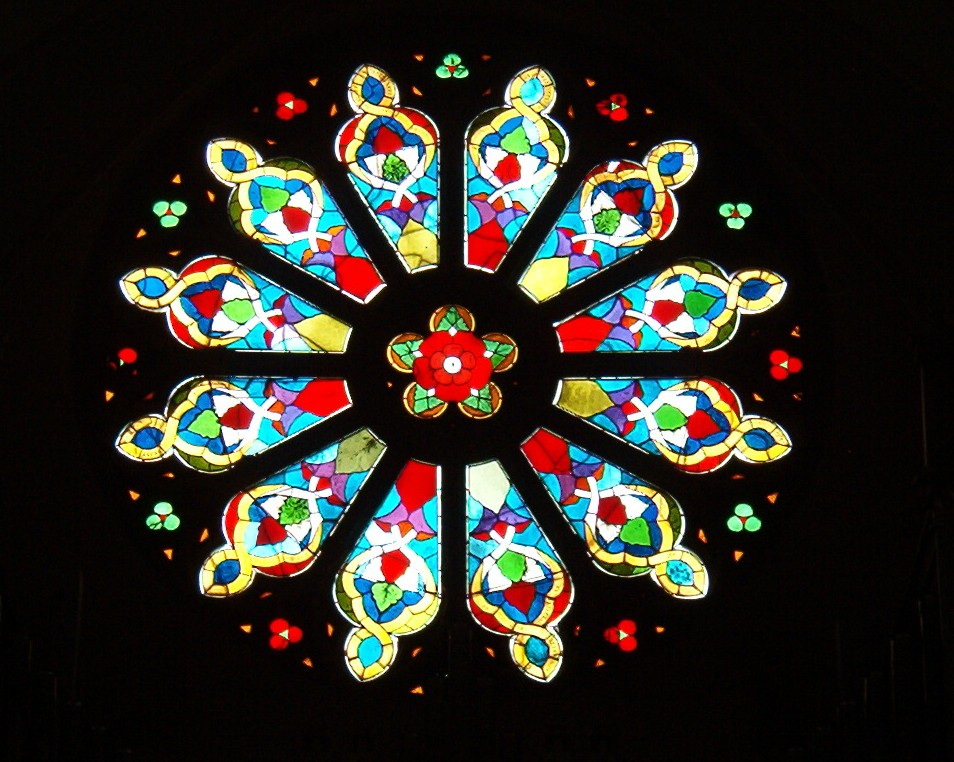
Sweden, Oscar Frediks Church

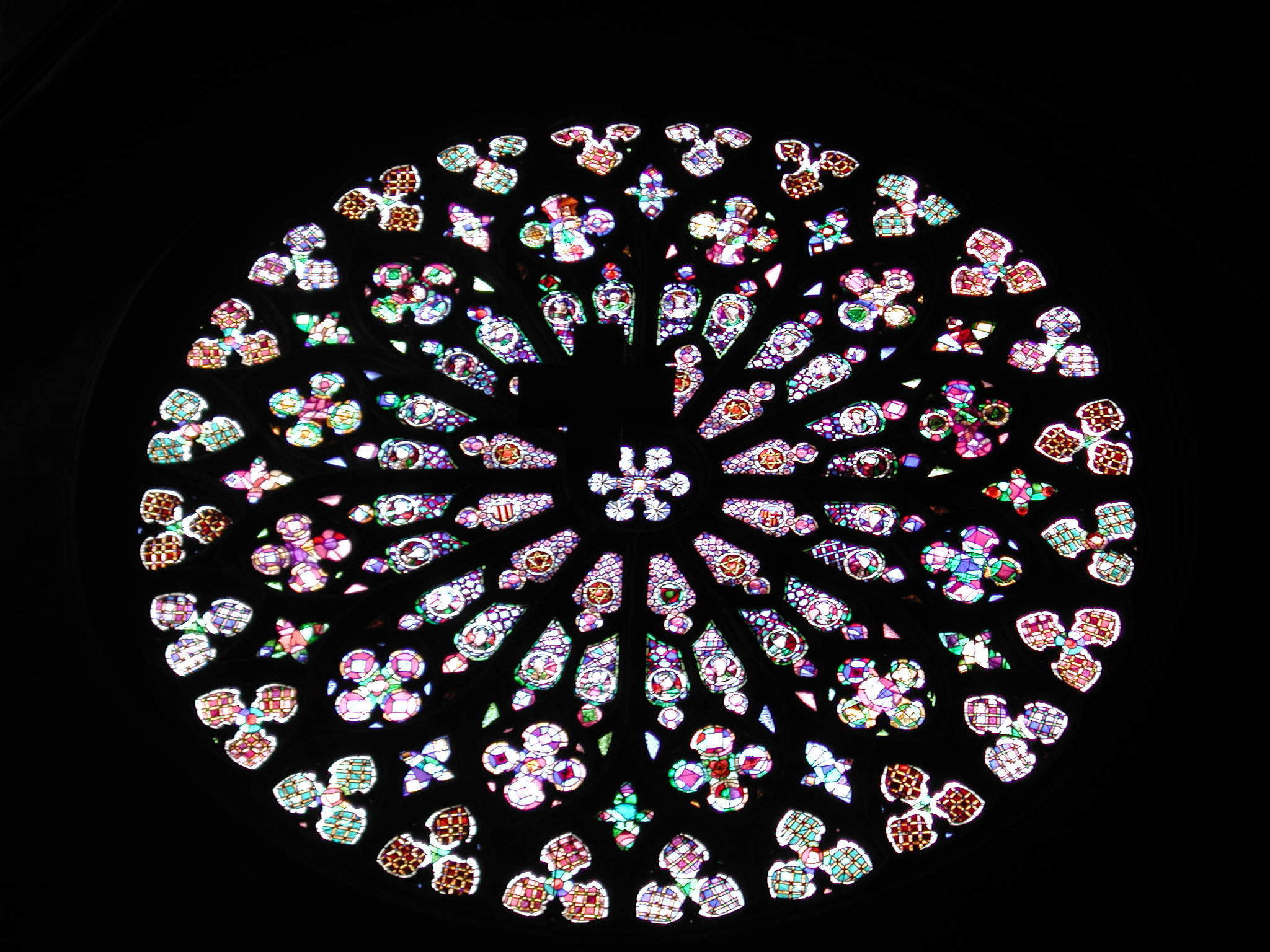
Catalonia, Spain, Santa Maria del Pi, Barcelona

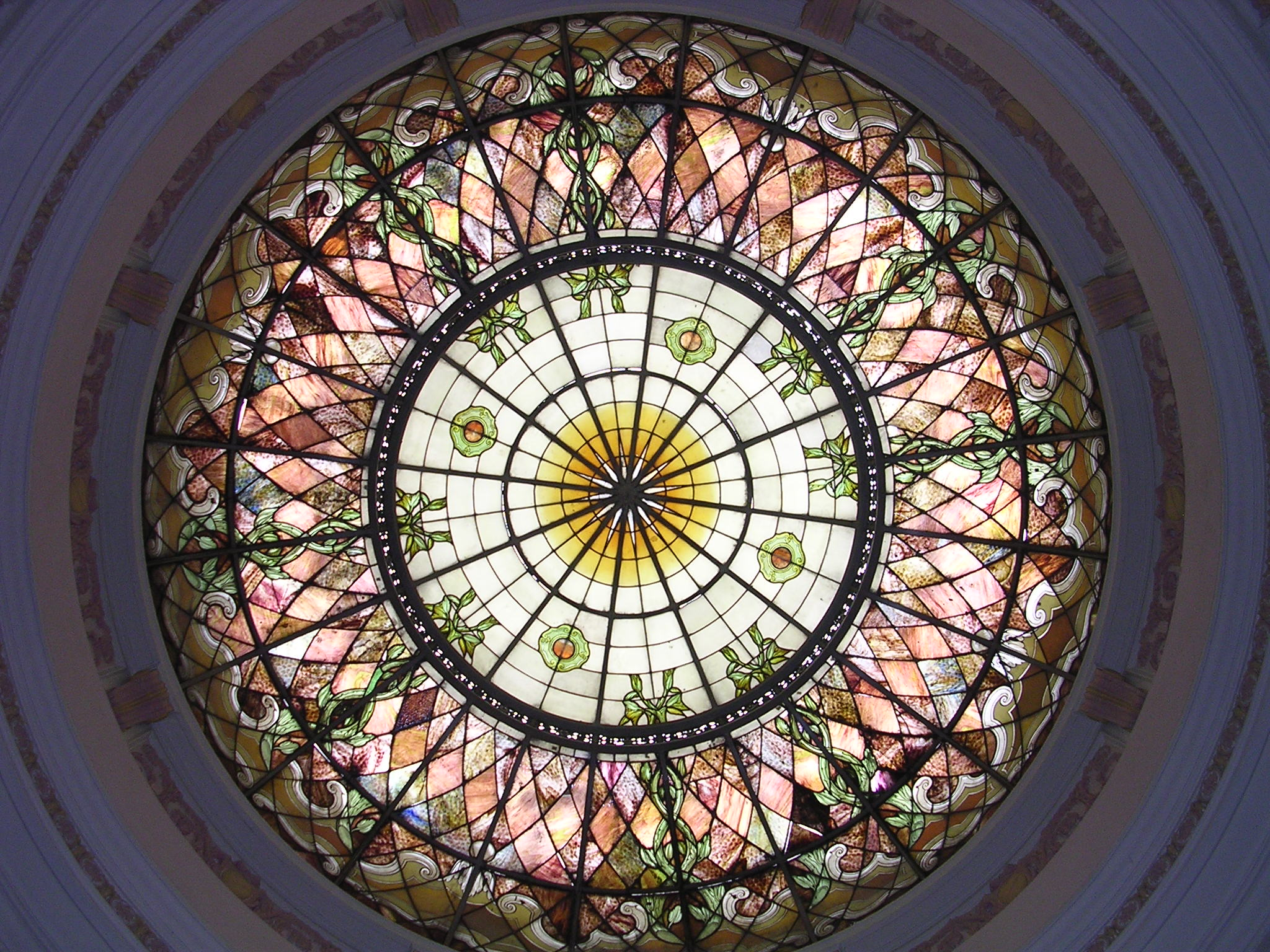
Peru, the Presidential Palace

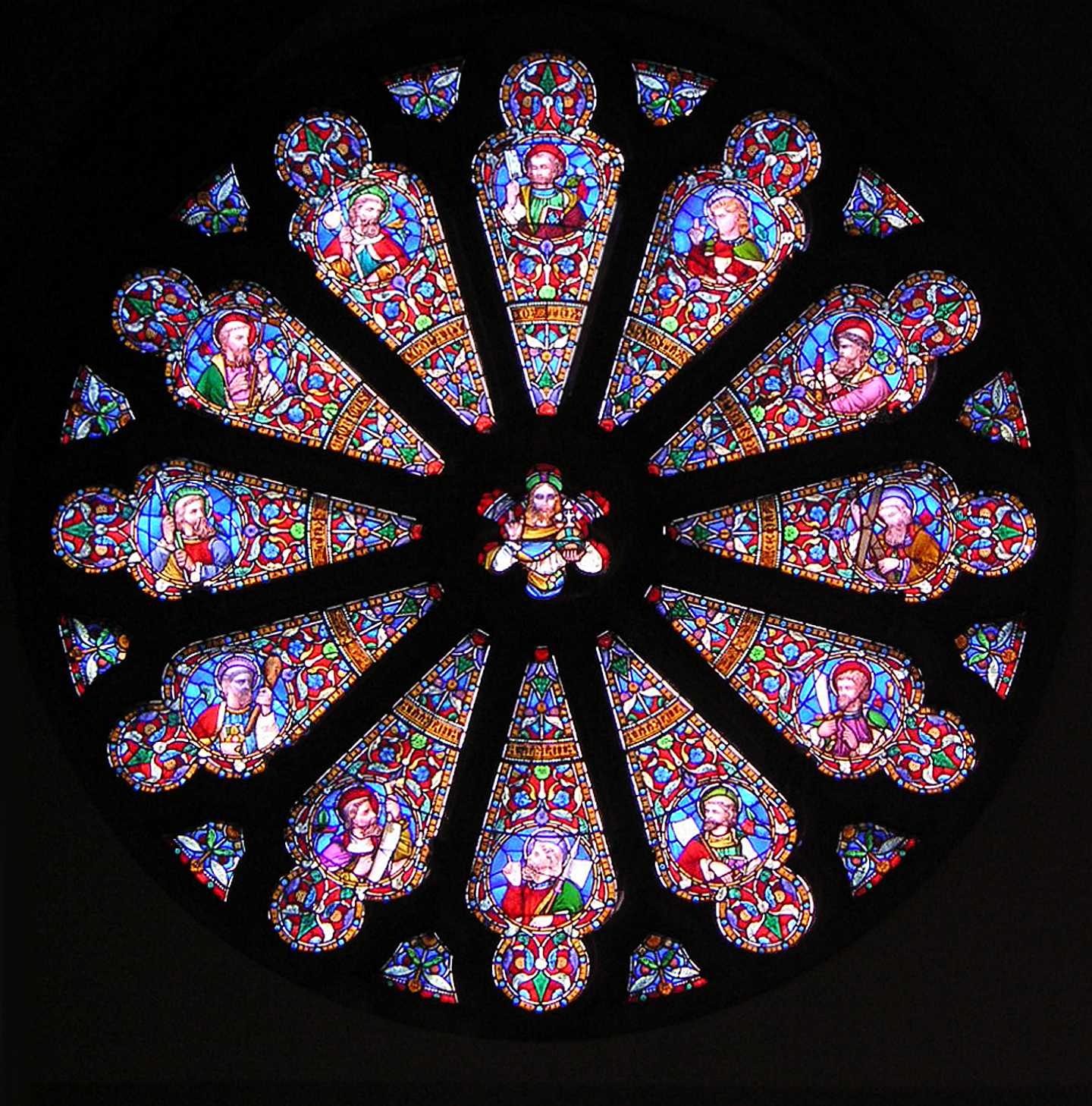
England, St Matthias, Richmond. architect G. Scott, glass William Wailes

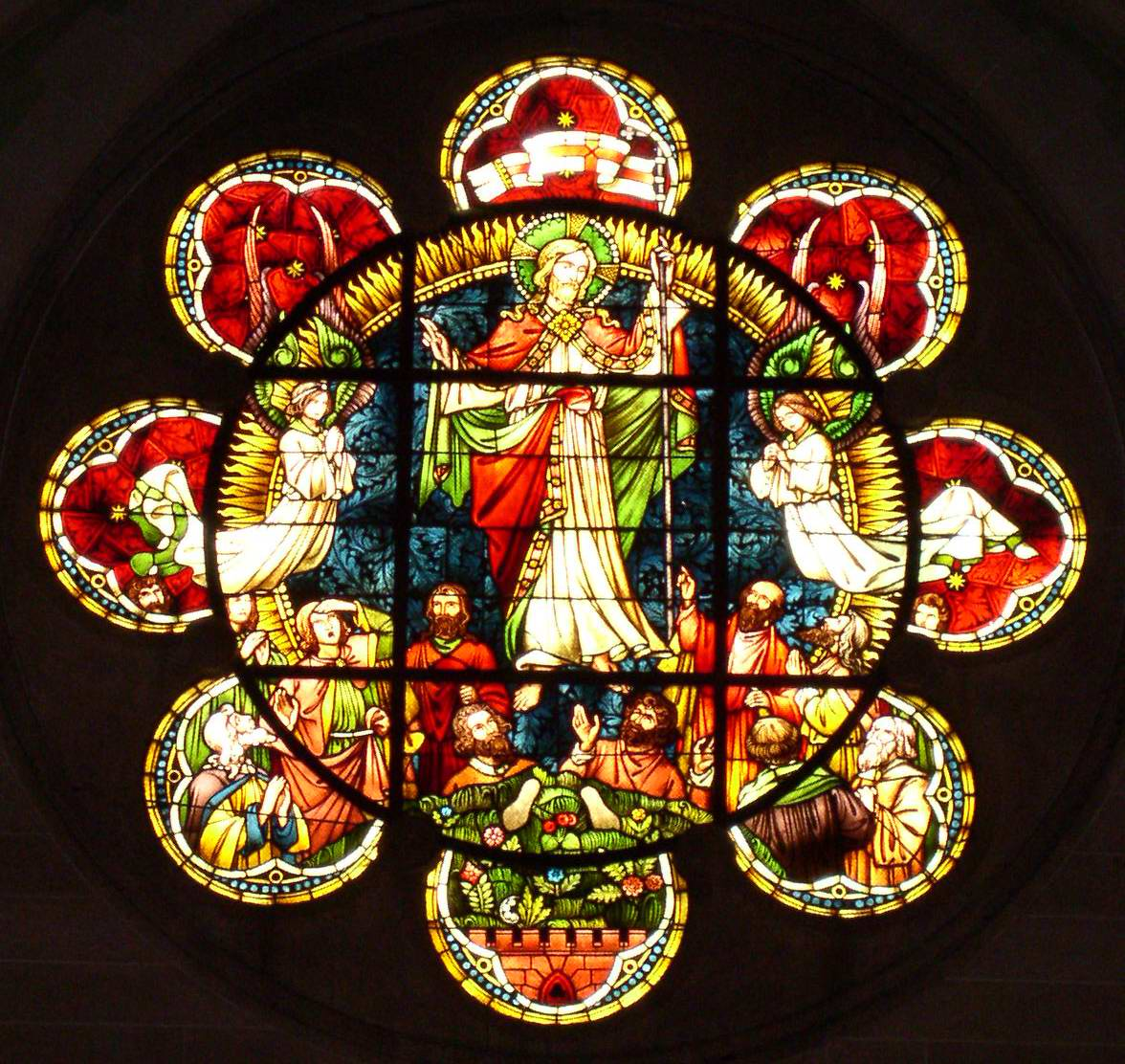
Germany, the chancel window of Himmelfahrtskirche, Dresden

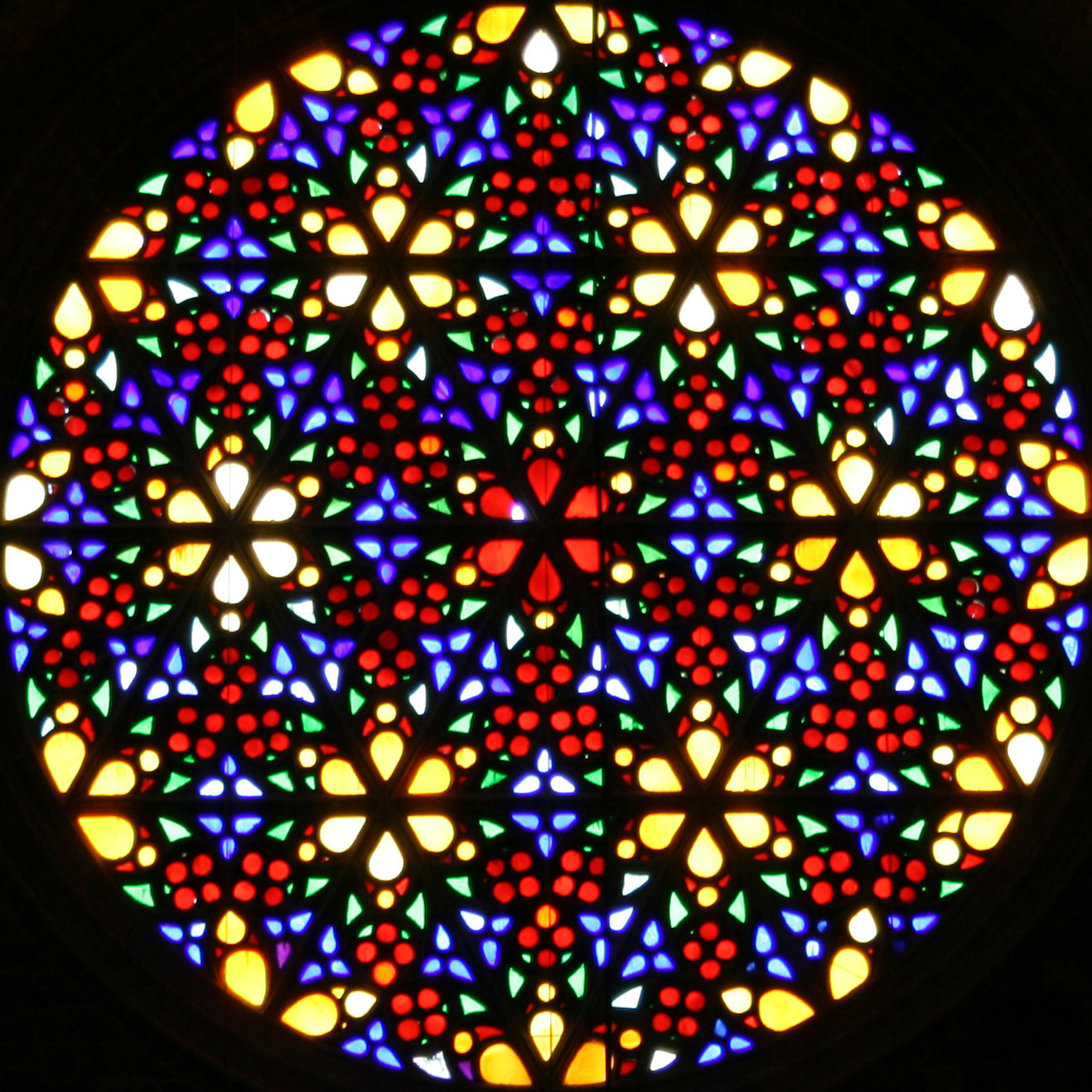
Spain, Mallorca, Palma, with a pattern which existed already in the ancient Roman and wisigothic roses

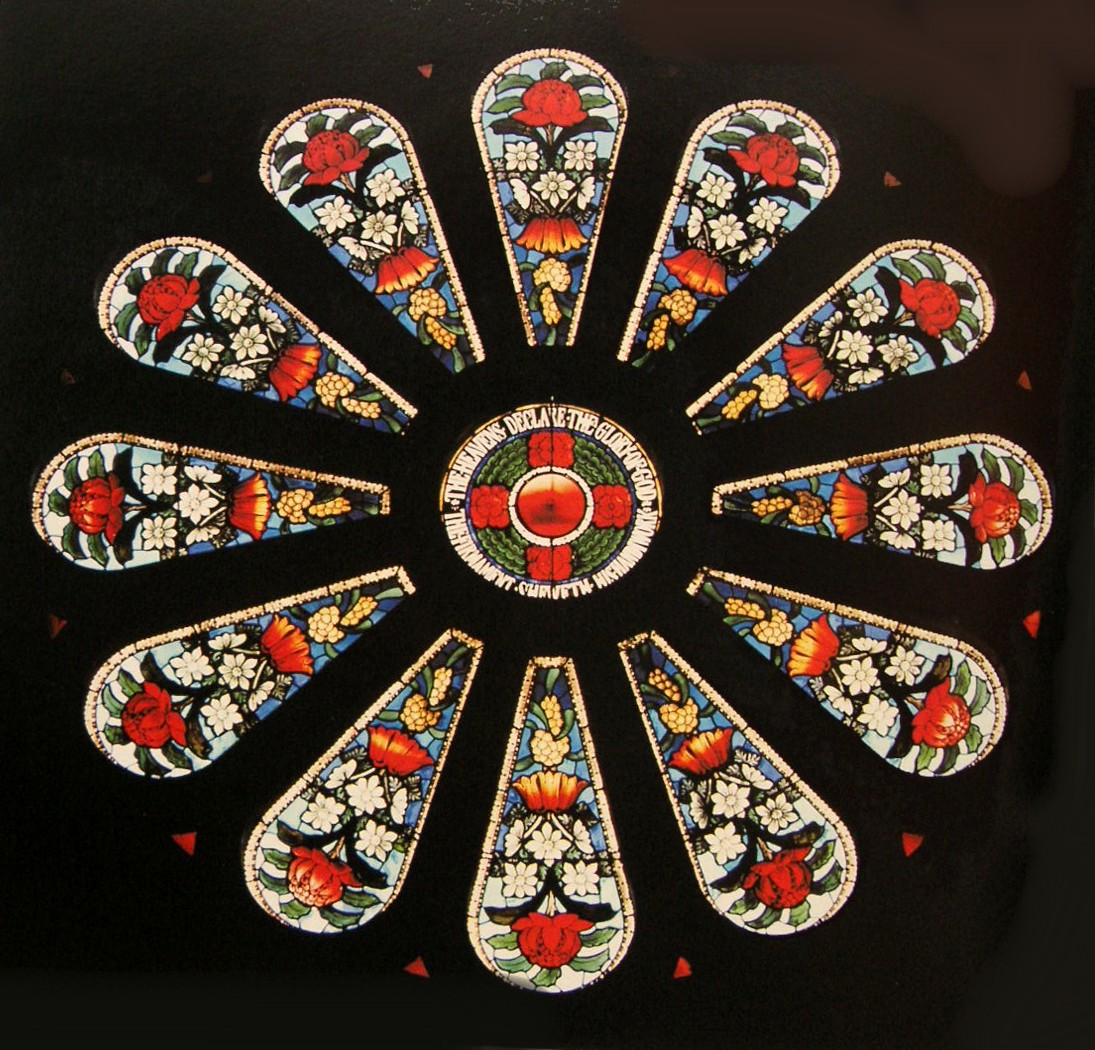
Australia, the Waratah window, St Bede's, Drummoyne, Sydney, by Alfred Handel

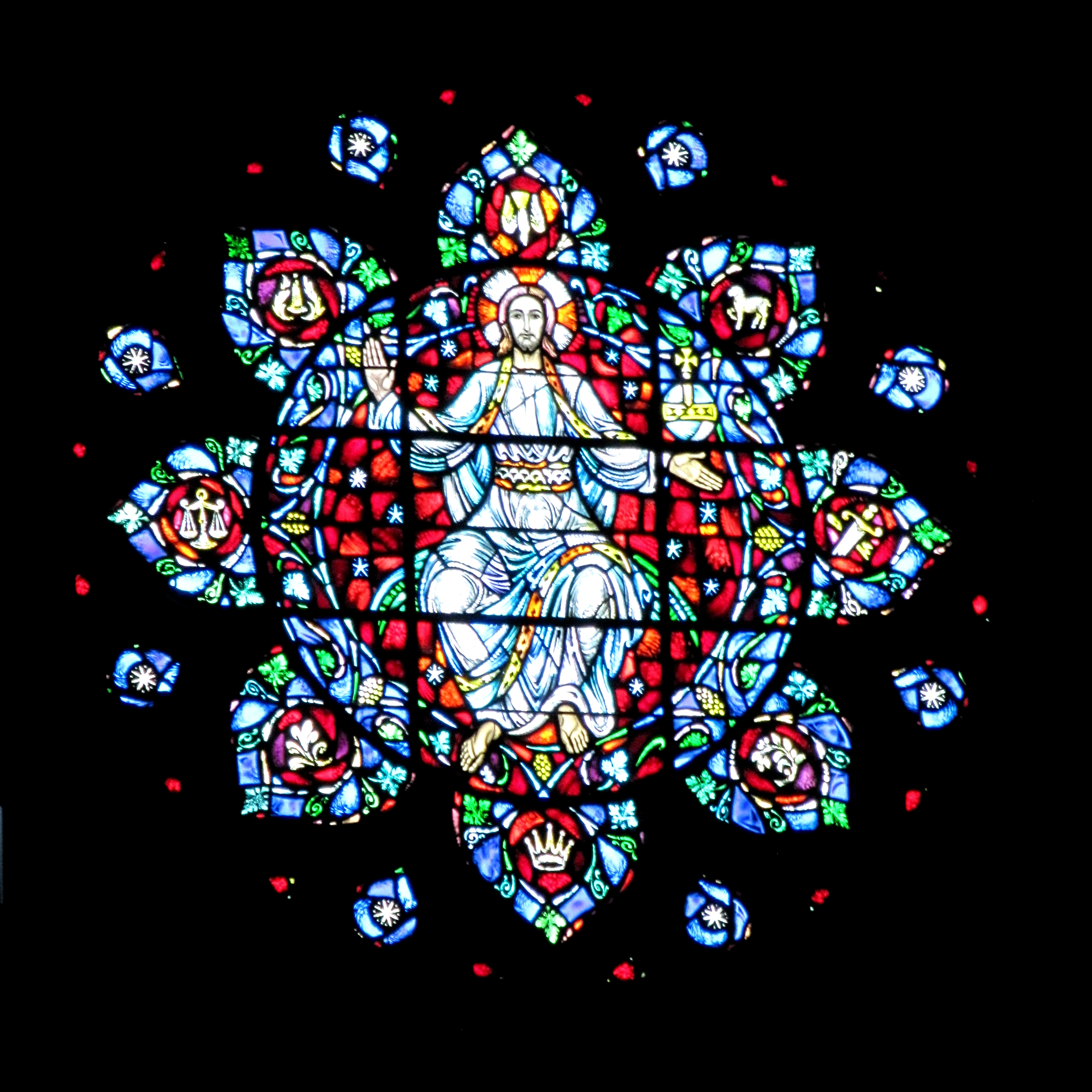
United States, window over the altar in Boston University's Marsh Chapel

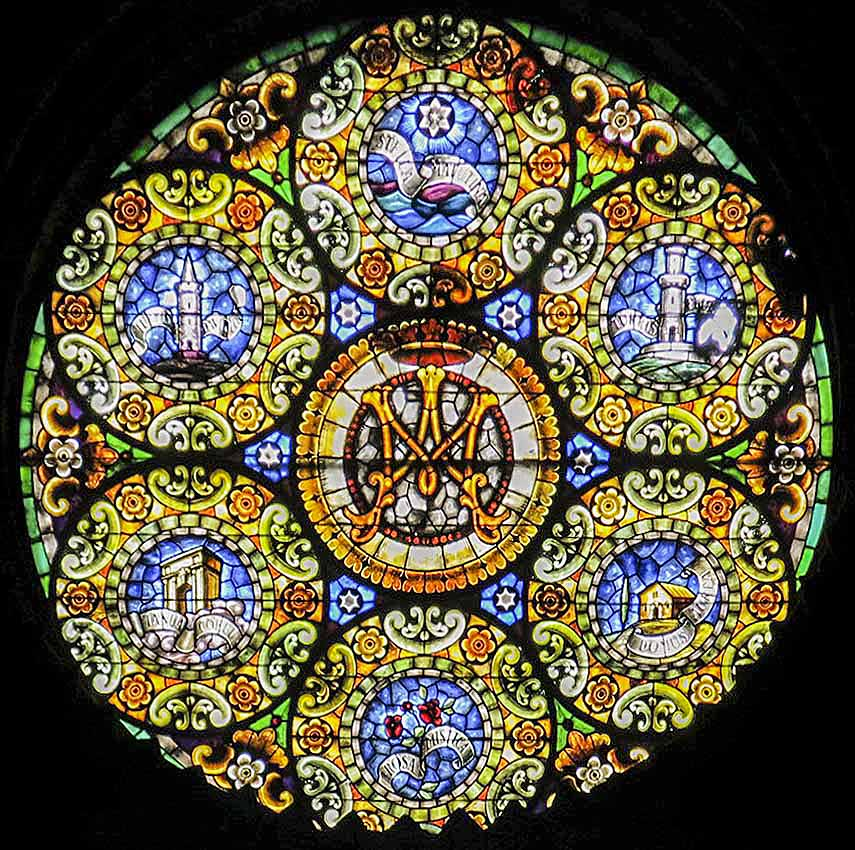
Catalonia, Solsona Cathedral

== See also ==
- English Gothic stained glass windows
- French Gothic stained glass windows
- Kaleidoscope
- Mandala
- Stained glass
