= Newington Academy for Girls =

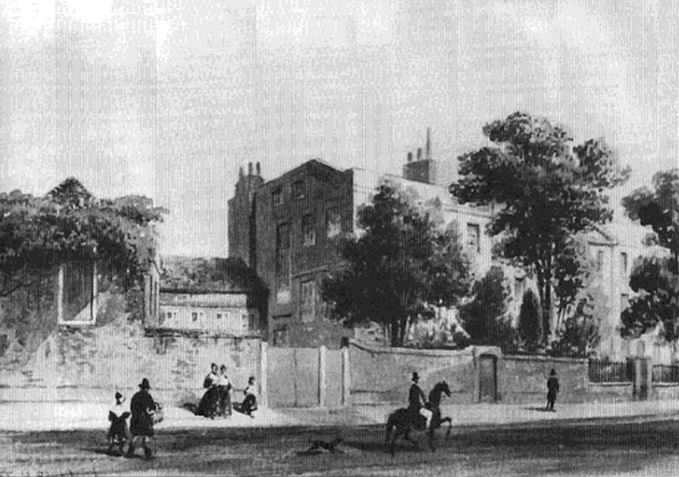
Fleetwood House in Stoke Newington which housed Newington Academy for Girls from 1824

The Newington Academy for Girls, also known as Newington College for Girls, was a Quaker school established in 1824 in Stoke Newington, then north of London. In a time when girls' educational opportunities were limited, it offered a wide range of subjects "on a plan in degree differing from any hitherto adopted", according to the prospectus. It was also innovative in commissioning the world's first school bus. One of its founders was William Allen, a scientist and businessman active with the Society for Effecting the Abolition of the Slave Trade.

== Background ==
Stoke Newington had a Quaker presence from the early days of the Society of Friends. (George Fox stayed for a time in neighbouring Dalston, for example.) From 1668 there was a Quaker girls' school in nearby Shacklewell, run first by Mary Stott and then Jane Bullock, “to Instruct younge lasses & maydens in whatsever thinges was civill & useful in ye creation” By the early nineteenth century, Stoke Newington was known for its Quaker residents, many of whom had connections to the Gracechurch Street meeting in the City of London. Samuel Hoare Jr, founding member of the Society for Effecting the Abolition of the Slave Trade, was born there, as was his brother Jonathan, who commissioned the mansion in Clissold Park.

The educational milieu was favourable. Nearby Newington Green was populated by Rational Dissenters of another denomination who were drawn to its Unitarian chapel. That village was known for its dissenting academies, establishments only open to boys and young men. Education for girls was still limited, but the English Enlightenment of the previous half-century had begun to push those boundaries. These villages north of London had been part of that movement: it was in Newington Green in 1785 that Mary Wollstonecraft opened her innovative boarding school for girls. Her first book, drawing on that time, was Thoughts on the Education of Daughters, and her most famous work, A Vindication of the Rights of Woman, bases its argument largely around education in its widest sense.

Quaker views on women had from the beginning tended towards equality, with women allowed to minister. Quaker women were involved in shaping the national conversation on subjects such as abolitionism; in the year of the school's founding, for example, Elizabeth Heyrick published a pamphlet entitled Immediate, not Gradual Abolition, which was influential in encouraging public opinion to support the cause.

== Location and neighbours ==
Newington Academy for Girls was established in Fleetwood House, which had been built in the 1630s for Sir Edward Hartopp. By marriage the estate passed to Charles Fleetwood, one of Oliver Cromwell's generals, from whom it got its name, and then through various parties until the foundation of the school. Fleetwood House served as a meeting place for Dissenters. Elizabeth Crisp ran a boarding school for young ladies there in the 1770s.

Its immediate neighbour to the west on what is now Stoke Newington Church Street was Abney House (the Manor House), which had been built for Thomas Gunston (1667–1700). He died as it was being completed and the estate passed to his sister, who married Sir Thomas Abney, a prosperous merchant and banker and later Lord Mayor of London, getting its name from them. The two mansions shared parkland, which was laid out by the lady of the manor, Lady Mary Abney, and her companion, Dr Isaac Watts, when they lived there in the early eighteenth century. They were neither Quakers nor members of the established church, but Independents or Congregationalists. The school made great use of Abney Park.

In the grounds was a third building, called the Summerhouse, but it must have been a proper dwelling, because it was taken from 1774 for summer residence by the family of the young James Stephen (1758–1832). Although not a Quaker, he grew up to be closely involved in a cause associated with them, the abolition of the slave trade. In 1800 he married a sister of his friend William Wilberforce, who visited Stoke Newington regularly. Between them, the two men drafted the Slave Trade Act 1807.

At the time of the school's foundation, Abney House was occupied by James William Freshfield (1774–1864) and his family. He founded the international law firm of that still bears his name and was a Conservative Member of Parliament. He too was one of the non-Quakers working for abolition. Freshfield bought Abney House in the 1810s and the Fleetwood Estate in 1827. From circa 1838 Abney House was used as a Wesleyan Methodist training college, before being demolished in 1843. The governorship of the seminary was held by Rev. John Farrar, Secretary of the Methodist Conference on fourteen occasions and twice its elected President, so Newington Academy for Girls had high-minded neighbours.

A fire station now stands on the site of Fleetwood House.

== Establishment ==
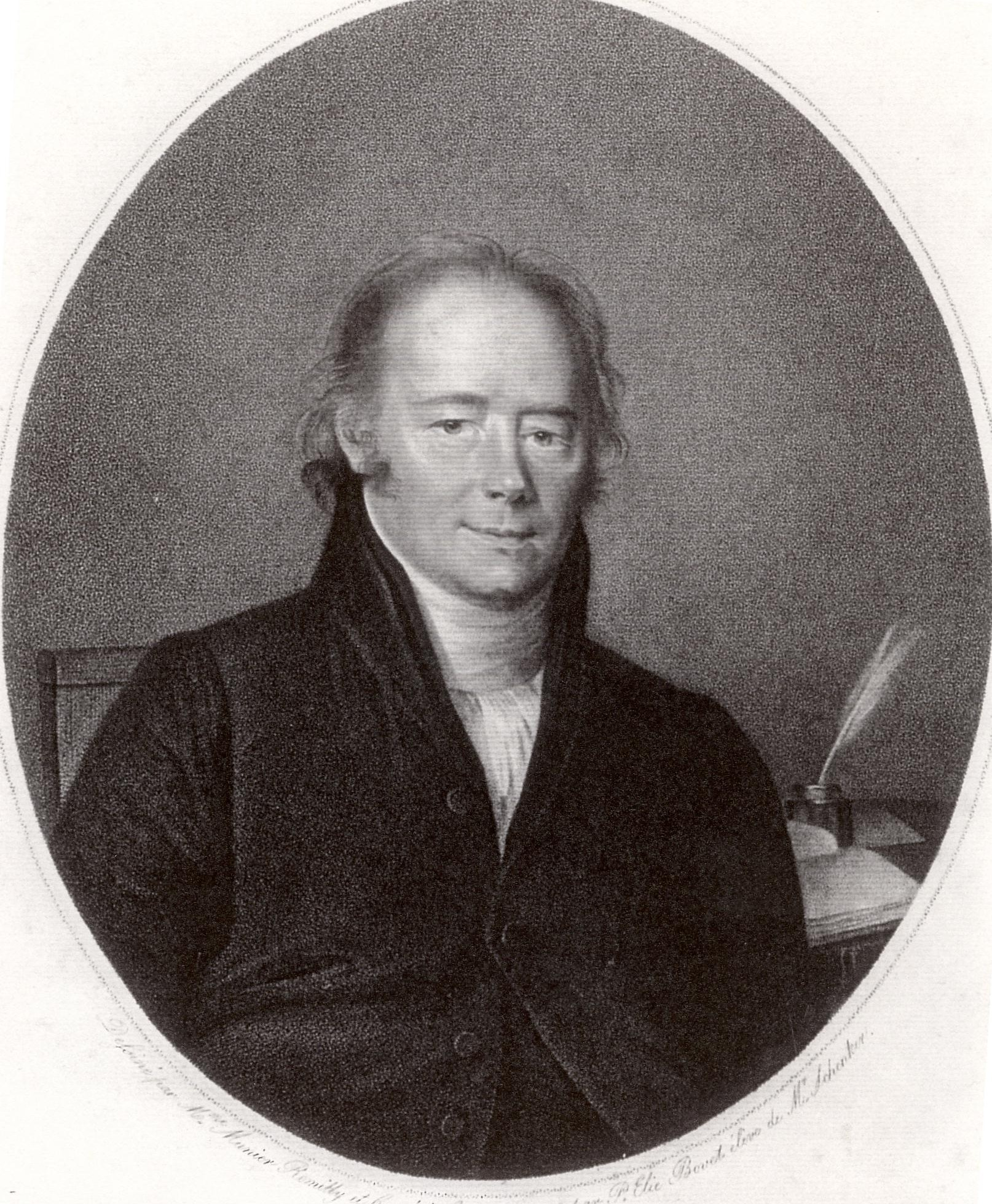
William Allen

Newington Academy for Girls issued its first prospectus on 14 August 1824 and it began taking pupils shortly thereafter. Its founders and benefactors included the Quaker scientist and abolitionist William Allen and his third wife Grizell (1757–1835), sister of Jonathan and Samuel Hoare Jr., mentioned above. She was a wealthy and elderly widow, having previously married a Birkbeck, and their marriage caused Robert Cruikshank to produce a satirical cartoon, in which the academy is referred to as "Newington Nunnery". Other founders included Anna Hanbury, mother of Sir Thomas Buxton, 1st Baronet, Luke Howard, pharmacist and meteorologist, Edward Harris, father-in-law of Alfred Tylor, and Samuel Gurney, banker.

The headmistress of the school was Susanna Corder (1787–1864). She appears to have learned the art of teaching at Suir Island School, later known as the Clonmel School, a Quaker establishment in Ireland. This had been set up by Sarah Tuke Grubb (1756–1790) and her husband Robert, who travelled extensively in Europe as missionaries. Sarah Grubb "believed that children needed both discipline and respect and should be taught useful skills". Susanna Corder later wrote biographies of Quakers, including an 1853 volume about (and drawing largely on the diaries of) Elizabeth Fry, whom she knew well enough to accompany when the prison reformer escorted the King of Prussia to see the conditions at Newgate in 1842.

The first prospectus proposed “an Establishment in our religious society on a plan in degree differing from any hitherto adopted, wherein the children of Friends should not only be liberally instructed in the Elements of useful knowledge, but in which particular attention should be paid to the state of mind of each individual child”. According to Fleetwood House, "It started with twelve pupils, but more than doubled in three years. Subjects included Astronomy, Physics, and Chemistry, which were taught by William Allen; the languages available included Latin, Greek, German and Italian as well as French." Allen hired the poet and revolutionary Ugo Foscolo to teach Italian, according to the History of the County of Middlesex.

One of the pupils influenced by the school was Louisa Hooper (1818–1918), who went on to marry John Stewart, owner of the Edinburgh Review. She was an early advocate of women's suffrage; in 1869 she published The Missing Law; or, Woman’s Birthright. She also worked on the temperance movement (abstention from alcohol) and set up a school in a caravan for circus children.

It is unclear when this novel Quaker girls' school closed, but it lost exclusive use of the eastern portion of Abney Park when the Abney Park Cemetery was formed in 1840, though the pupils thereafter benefitted from its splendid educational arboretum designed by Loddiges. Fleetwood House itself was demolished in 1872.

== World's first school bus ==
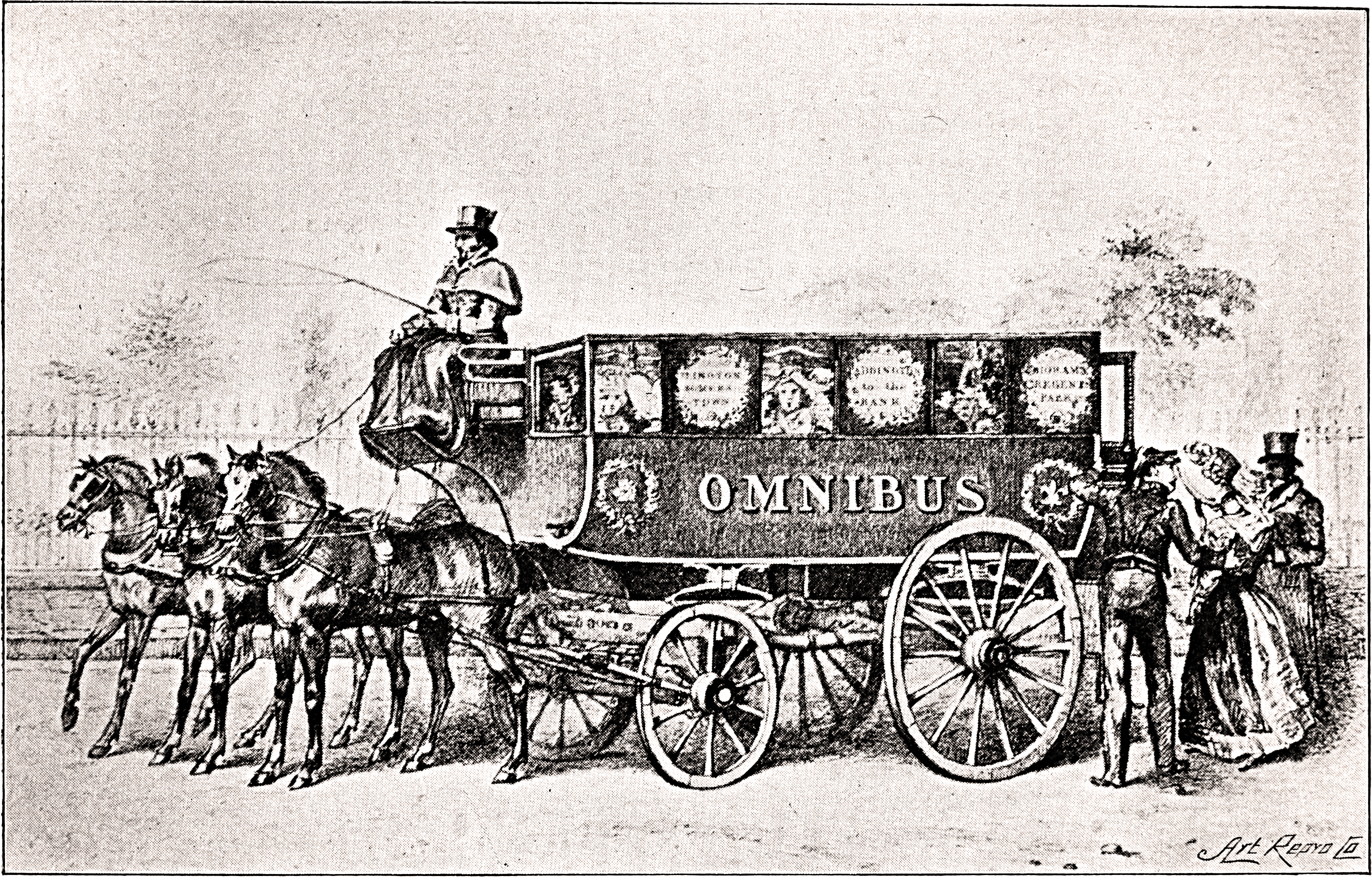
Shillibeer's first omnibus

The school was a couple of miles from Gracechurch Street, the site of the Friends meeting house in the City of London. This was felt to be quite a distance for the pupils to walk, so another solution was sought.

George Shillibeer (1797–1866) grew up in London and worked for the coach company Hatchetts in Long Acre, the coach-building district of the capital. In the 1820s he was offered work in Paris, where he was commissioned to build some unusually large horse-drawn coaches of "novel design". The aim was to build a coach capable of transporting a whole group of people, perhaps two dozen, at a time. Shillibeer's design worked, was very stable, and was introduced into the streets of Paris in 1827. Shortly afterwards, he built another van specifically for the Newington Academy, seating 25 pupils on a pair of facing benches. This entered history as the first school bus.

The Quaker population of Stoke Newington was growing, and in 1828 a meeting house opened in Park Street (now Yoakley Road). The pupils could attend service locally, and so the school bus was decommissioned. Repainted, it served to launch London's first omnibus service the following year, from Paddington to the Bank of England, mainly along the New Road (now Euston Road). A full-size replica of the van is in London Transport Museum.

== Pease's poem ==
One early visitor was Joseph Pease, a railway pioneer who later became the first Quaker MP. He wrote a doggerel verse in praise of the girls' school in 1827, reflecting the novelty of a school for girls teaching such a breadth of subjects.

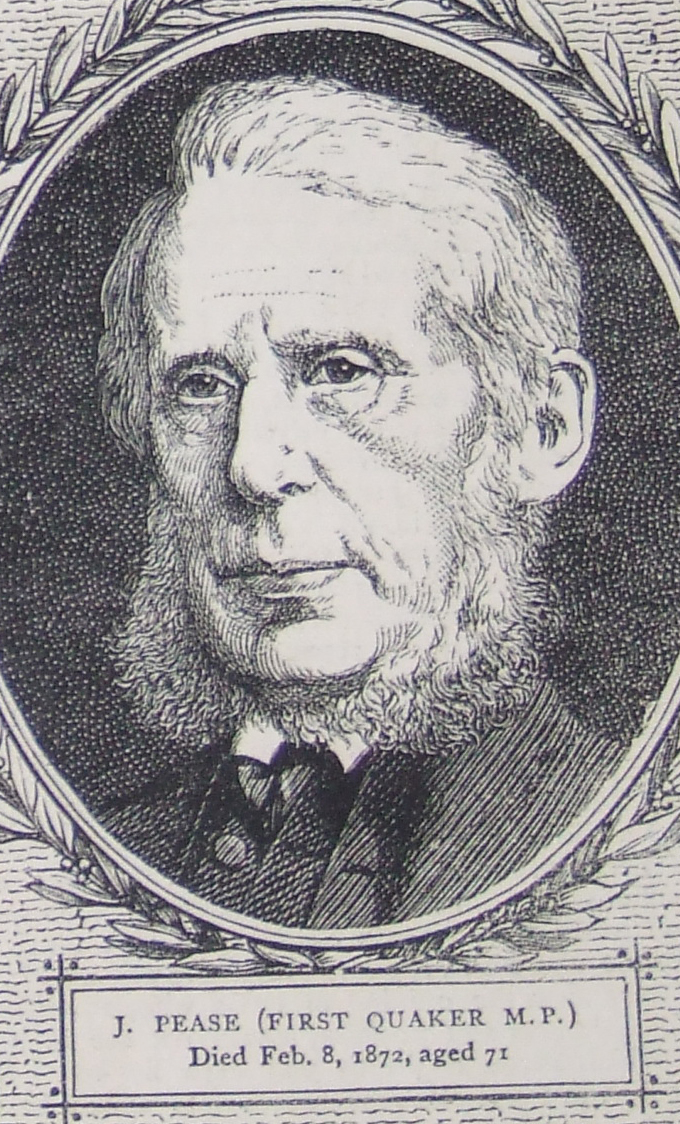

"Dear Coz in my last
I shewed the advantage as well as renown
That our body of Friends cannot fail to acquire
By the Female Establishment two miles from Town"

"Where the pupils imbibe such astounding variety
Of stores intellectual - I solemly vow
Since the earliest days of the Quaker Society,
Such achievements by girls were ne'er heard of till now."

"No science, no art, in their tribe is a mystery
The path of the earth and the tides of the sea,
Cosmography, Algebra, Chemistry, History
To those juvenile Blues are a mere A.B.C"

"And in languages -oh you'd not credit their skill !
One can scarce name a tongue, Coz, but what they can reason in,
Greek, Hebrew, French, Latin, Italian at will,
With Irish and Welch for occasional seasoning."

"The strainht path of Truth the dear Girl's keep their feet in
And ah ! It would do your heart good Cousin Anne
To see them arriving at Gracechurch Street Meeting
All snugly packed 25 in a van."

"Coz" is an abbreviation for "cousin", but was often used to indicate a wide range of family relationships; "Friends" means "Quaker" and "Town" means "London"; "Blues" presumably refers to Bluestockings, learned women, rather than Oxbridge athletes; Gracechurch Street is a metonym for the Quaker meeting house in the City that they attended for services; the "van" is the school bus.

== Sources ==
- Shirren, A.J. (reprint; 1951 1st ed) The Chronicles of Fleetwood House. University of Houston Foundation: Pacesetter
- Whitehead, Jack (1983) The Growth of Stoke Newington. London: J Whitehead
- Joyce, Paul (1984) A guide to Abney Park Cemetery. London: Hackney Society
