= Joseph Fox =

Joseph or Joe Fox may refer to:

- Joseph Fox the younger (1758–1838), British medical doctor
- Joseph Fox (Michigan politician), state legislator
- Joseph Fox (Pennsylvania politician), speaker of the Pennsylvania Provincial Assembly, 1764–66
- Joseph Fox (dental surgeon) (1775–1816), British pioneer of dental education
- Joseph John Fox (1855–1915), Roman Catholic bishop
- Joe Fox (boxer) (1894–1965), British boxer
- Joe Fox (footballer) (1879–1948), Australian rules footballer
- Joe Fox (politician) (1931–1981), Irish politician
- Joseph Francis Fox (1853–1903), Member of Parliament for Tullamore
