= Susanna Corder =

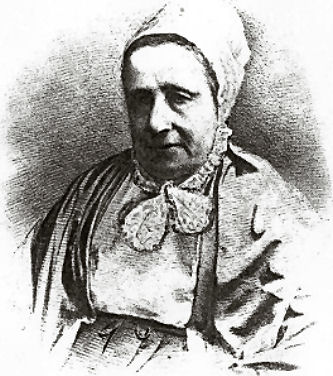
Susanna Corder

Susanna Corder (9 November 1787 – 28 February 1864) was an educationist and Quaker biographer.

== Early years ==
Corder was born in 1787 in Kelvedon in Essex, the daughter of Quakers Ruth née Marriage and John Corder, a farmer. A sickly child, she attended Ackworth School in Yorkshire (1797–1799). Aged about 20 having passed through a period of spiritual doubt Corder underwent a religious revival. Having felt a calling to be a teacher for some years, after the death of her mother whom she nursed in her last years Corder embarked on that course, teaching at Suir Island School, later known as the Clonmel School, a Quaker establishment in Ireland. Corder remained here from 1817 to 1824. The school had been set up by Sarah Tuke Grubb (1756–1790) and her husband Robert, who travelled extensively in Europe as missionaries. Sarah Grubb "believed that children needed both discipline and respect and should be taught useful skills.".

== Newington Academy for Girls ==
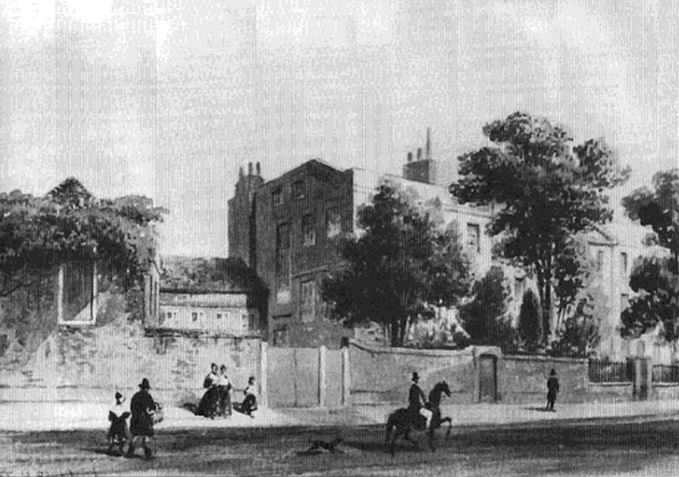
Fleetwood House in Stoke Newington which housed Newington Academy for Girls from 1824

On returning to England in 1824 and with the assistance of the Quaker scientist and abolitionist William Allen and his third wife Grizell (1757–1835) Corder opened Newington Academy for Girls in Fleetwood House in Stoke Newington, the organisation of which she based on the school in Ireland she had recently left. Newington Academy for Girls issued its first prospectus on 14 August 1824 and it began taking pupils shortly thereafter. Corder was the headmistress of the new school, other founders of which included Anna Hanbury, mother of Sir Thomas Buxton, 1st Baronet, Luke Howard, pharmacist and meteorologist, Edward Harris, father-in-law of Alfred Tylor, and Samuel Gurney, banker.

The first prospectus proposed "an Establishment in our religious society on a plan in degree differing from any hitherto adopted, wherein the children of Friends should not only be liberally instructed in the Elements of useful knowledge, but in which particular attention should be paid to the state of mind of each individual child". According to Fleetwood House, "It started with twelve pupils, but more than doubled in three years. Subjects included Astronomy, Physics, and Chemistry, which were taught by William Allen; the languages available included Latin, Greek, German and Italian as well as French." Allen hired the poet and revolutionary Ugo Foscolo to teach Italian, according to the History of the County of Middlesex William Allen also made his telescope available for the use of the girls. In 1827 the varied curriculum available at Newington Academy for Girls was referenced in some doggerel verses by Joseph Pease who commented on the 'astounding variety of stores intellectual imbibed by pupils at the "N[ewington] Nunnery".

Discipline at the school was strict. Deeply conservative in her own religious faith, Corder imposed this view on her school. She herself wore traditional Quaker dress and adopted this as the uniform for the girls in her school who had to wear Quaker bonnets among other items of dress, leading to much mockery from the girls at a nearby school. Nor were the girls’ spiritual needs forgotten as they were obliged to attend regular readings from the Scriptures and attend talks on religion given by William Allen and Sarah Tuke Grubb. School holidays involved visits to the British Museum and other worthy venues.

Corder became an elder of her local Meeting house shortly after moving to Stoke Newington. As such in 1836 she was among the co-signatories of a warning letter to John Wilkinson who had caused a schism among the local Quaker community and in which he was entreated to be silent in their meetings. For 15 years she was on the revising committee of the Morning Meeting. In 1841 Corder published A Brief Outline of the Origin, Principles, and Church Government of the Society of Friends in which she emphasised her commitment to traditional Quaker dress, manners and teachings.

== Retirement and writing ==
Corder retired sometime between 1840 and 1845 with the closure of Newington Academy for Girls and moved to Chelmsford where she spent her last years. It was at this time that she began writing in earnest; she had already published Memorials of Deceased Members of the Society of Friends which went through at least six revised editions and in which she wrote on the lives of 18th and 19th-century English and American Quakers, commenting on their spiritual lives, their opinions and their religious work – often describing their edifying deaths with some relish. Many of the subjects of the book were little known; one was her own pupil Ann Backhouse, who had died at the age of nineteen. Corder's decision to concentrate on the spiritual lives of her subjects rather than on their careers enabled her to maintain a roughly equal balance of male and female subjects – 27 men and 20 women. Corder wrote an 1853 biography about (and drawing largely on the diaries of) the prison reformer Elizabeth Fry, whom she knew well enough to accompany when the prison reformer escorted the King of Prussia to see the conditions at Newgate in 1842. Three years later Corder wrote a memoir of Priscilla Gurney, Fry's sister.

Susanna Corder also published Christian Instruction in the History, Types, and Prophecies of the Old Testament (1854). She also wrote several pamphlets, including one advocating the exercise of spiritual gifts by women (1839).

Susanna Corder died on 28 February 1864 at her home in Chelmsford and was buried in the town on 3 March.
