= Shall Wisdom Cry Aloud =

American Christian hymn

- Christian hymn
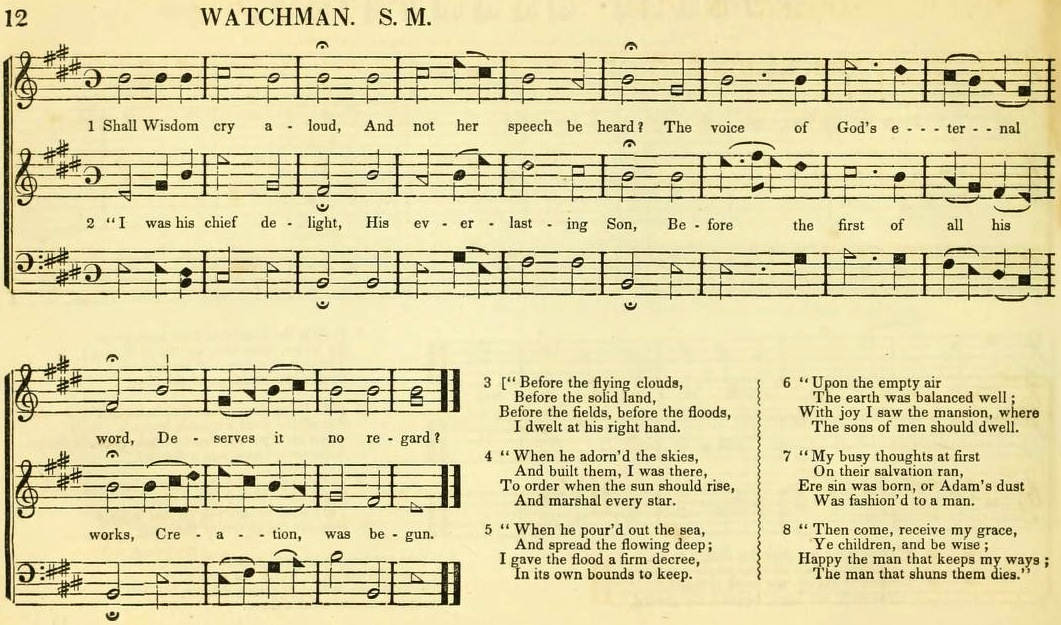
- The hymn in an 1860 publication
- Text: Isaac Watts
- Meter: 6.6.8.6 (S.M.)
- Published: 1748

"Shall Wisdom Cry Aloud" is a Christian hymn by Isaac Watts (d. 1748), a poetic adaptation of Proverbs 8:1;22-32. The lyrics have been combined with different tunes, one of them called "Watchman", composed by James Leach (d. 1798), another called "St. Thomas", composed by Aaron Williams (d. 1776).

== Lyrics ==
1. Shall Wisdom cry aloud, And not her speech be heard?
The voice of God's eternal word, Deserves it no regard?

2. "I was his chief delight, His everlasting Son,
Before the first of all his works, Creation, was begun.

3. "Before the flying clouds, Before the solid land,
Before the fields, before the floods, I dwelt at his right hand.

4. "When he adorn'd the skies, And built them, I was there,
To order when the sun should rise, And marshal every star.

5. "When he pour'd out the sea, And spread the flowing deep;
I gave the flood a firm decree, In its own bounds to keep.

6. "Upon the empty air The earth was balanced well;
With joy I saw the mansion, where The sons of men should dwell.

7. "My busy thoughts at first On their salvation ran,
Ere sin was born, or Adam's dust Was fashion'd to a man.

8. "Then come, receive my grace, Ye children, and be wise;
Happy the man that keeps my ways; the man that shuns them dies."
