= William Allen (English Quaker) =

English scientist, philanthropist, and abolitionist

William Allen FRS FLS FGS
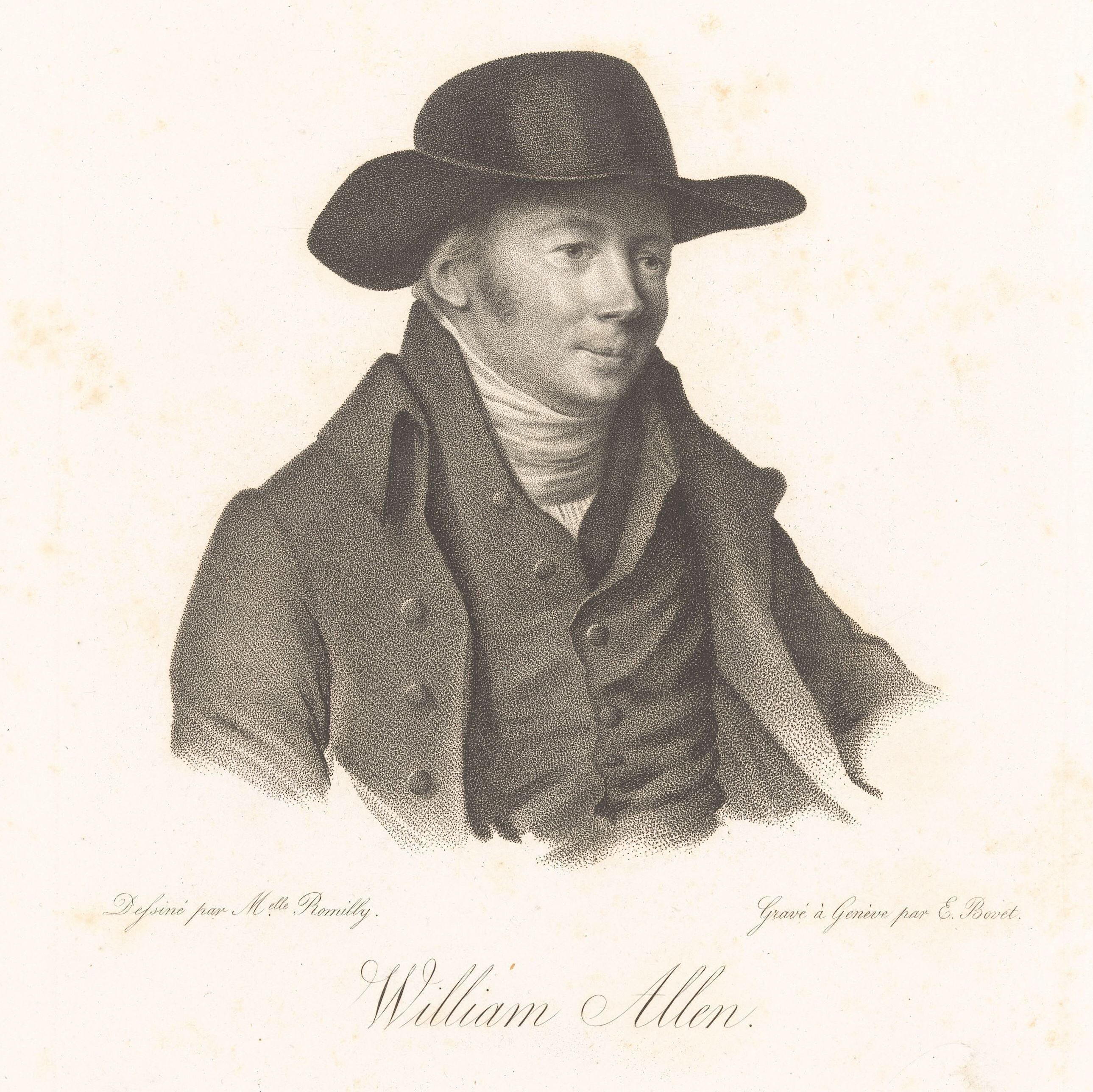
- William Allen after Amélie Munier-Romilly
- Born: 29 August 1770; Spitalfields, London, England
- Died: 30 September 1843 (aged 73); Stoke Newington, London, England
- Movement: Abolitionist Quakers

William Allen FRS FLS FGS (29 August 1770 – 30 September 1843) was an English Quaker, scientist and philanthropist who opposed slavery and engaged in schemes of social and penal improvement in early 19th-century England.

== Early life ==
Allen was born in 1770, the eldest son in the Quaker family of Job Allen (1734–1800), a silk manufacturer, and his wife Margaret Stafford (died 1830). He was educated at a Quaker school in Rochester, Kent, and then went into his father's business. As a young man in the 1790s, he became interested in science. He attended meetings of scientific societies, including lectures at St. Thomas's Hospital and Guy's Hospital, becoming a member of the Chemical Society of the latter establishment. On Job Allen's death, the family silk firm was taken over by his father's assistant.

Allen had concentrated on his own career in the field of pharmacy, taking over the Plough Court chemical business of Joseph Gurney Bevan who retired in 1795. In 1802, he was elected a Fellow of the Linnean Society and lectured on chemistry at Guy's Hospital. A year later he was made president of the Physical Society at Guy's, and on the advice of Humphry Davy and John Dalton also accepted an invitation from the Royal Institution to become one of its lecturers.

In 1807, Allen's original research (on carbon) enabled him to be successfully proposed for election to Fellowship of the Royal Society, bringing him into contact with those who were publishing much of the original scientific research of the day. This strengthened his ties with the eminent Humphry Davy, and in due course with his long-standing friend Luke Howard, who was likewise elected to Fellowship of the Royal Society, though some years later.

== Pharmacist ==
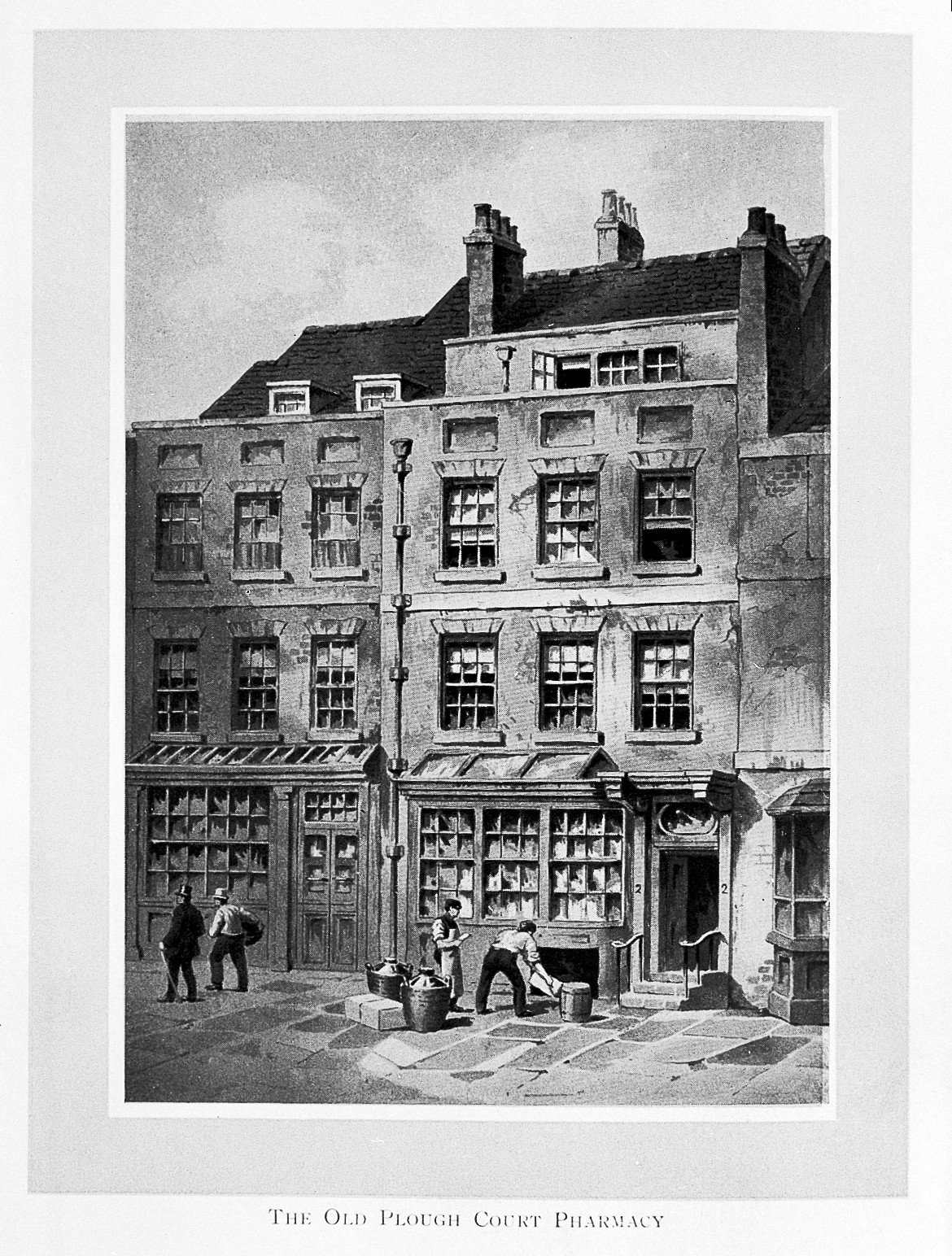
The Old Plough Court Pharmacy

Allen was known in commerce for his pharmaceutical company at 2 Plough Court, trading in 1795 as Mildred & Allen while he was in partnership with Samuel Mildred. It was situated off Lombard Street in London. In 1797, Allen brought in Luke Howard as a partner. A later partner was Daniel Bell Hanbury, father of the botanist Daniel Hanbury. By 1856, the company had become Allen & Hanburys. It was acquired in 1958 by Glaxo Laboratories, who retained the Allen & Hanburys name as a separate marque within the GSK group.

Allen strengthened the company's links with medical institutions, particularly Guy's Hospital, where he was elected to its Physical Society. Using Plough Court for meetings, he also co-founded the Askesian Society. There new ideas for research and experimentation could be discussed with others such as Luke Howard, Joseph Fox, William Hasledine Pepys, William Babington, and the surgeon Astley Cooper. A second laboratory was opened for the development of new chemicals, a few miles away in Plaistow.

In 1841, Jacob Bell pressed for a professional body for pharmacists. Allen co-founded The Pharmaceutical Society, which later became The Royal Pharmaceutical Society. He was its first president.

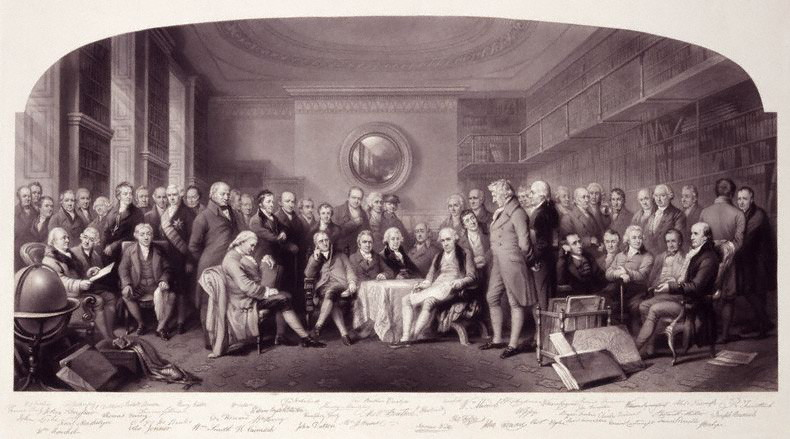
Distinguished Men of Science. Use the cursor to see who is who.

== Abolitionist ==
As a teenager, under the influence of Quaker abolitionists, Allen gave up sugar as a reaction to the Atlantic slave trade and abstained from it until 1834. He became interested in the politics of abolitionism in 1790/1, and in 1792, made a speech on the topic at the Worshipful Company of Coachmaker's Hall. The speech was published as a pamphlet by Martha Gurney, which was influenced by writer William Fox. In 1794, he befriended Thomas Clarkson.

In 1805, after some years of assisting the Society for the Abolition of the Slave Trade, William Allen was elected to its committee.

Allen is to the front and left of this painting of the 1840 Anti-Slavery Convention. Move your cursor to identify him or click the icon to enlarge

The group had always been strongly influenced by Quakers, and particularly by those based in or near London. All the members of its predecessor committee (1783–1787) had been Quakers, and nine of the twelve founders of the subsequent non-denominational Society for the Abolition of the Slave Trade were Quakers, including two – Samuel Hoare Jr and Joseph Woods Sr (father of the botanist Joseph Woods Jr) – who lived close to William Allen in Stoke Newington, the village near London where Allen had family interests after his second marriage in 1806.

Perhaps the best known committee member of the new non-denominational abolition society, founded in 1787, was William Wilberforce, who, unlike its Quaker members, was eligible as an Anglican to be elected to, and sit in, the House of Commons. Wilberforce visited William Allen at his experimental gardens on several occasions in his role as the Society's parliamentary representative. He had long been familiar with the village, owing to family connections. His sister Sarah had married the lawyer James Stephens, whose family home was the Summerhouse, a large house adjoining Abney Park in the very grounds of the mansion that later, in the 1820s, was to become Allen's novel girls' school.

William Allen was also a founder member and a Director of the African Institution, the successor body to the Sierra Leone Company, sponsored by philanthropists to establish a colony in West Africa for slaves freed on a voluntary basis, through the abolitionists' efforts, in America. The work of the successor body began in 1808, when the colony had been handed to the Crown in return for the British Parliament passing legislation for its protection at about the same time as the passing in 1807 of the Act for the abolition of the slave trade.

Allen's active interest in the abolitionist cause continued until his death. In the mid-1830s he was passionate about abolition of the apprenticeship clause, and achieving the complete freedom of African-Caribbean people on 1 August 1838. His biographer, James Sherman, records, "the apprenticeship clause in the Bill... had been greatly abused by the planters. Mr Allen was indefatigable in his efforts, by interviews with Ministers and official persons.. His account of the spirit-stirring time is graphic:"

The cruelty and oppression of the planters of Jamaica, as exercised on those poor sufferers, whose redemption from slavery we have paid twenty millions, has been exposed in the face of day. The West Indies in 1837, the result of personal investigation by our friend Joseph Sturge, has created a great sensation... The Anti Slavery Associations in all quarters are in a high degree of excitement, and petitions are loading the tables of both Houses of Parliament, begging for the abolition of the apprenticeship clause, and the complete establishment of freedom...on the 1st of Eight Month, 1838.

In 1838, the Friends sent a party to France. Allen went with Elizabeth Fry and her husband, Lydia Irving, and Josiah Forster. They were there on other business but despite the language barrier Fry and Irving visited French prisons.

In 1839, Allen became a founding Committee Member of the British and Foreign Anti-slavery Society for the Abolition of Slavery and the Slave-trade Throughout the World, which is today known as Anti-Slavery International. In this role he was an organiser of, and delegate to, the world's first anti-slavery convention, which was held in London in 1840 – an event depicted in a large painting by Benjamin Haydon that hangs in the National Portrait Gallery, London.

== Pacifist ==
Allen made an approving note in his diary, during 1798, on a pacifist tract, The Lawfulness of Defensive War upon Christian Principles Impartially Considered. It was by "A Clergyman of the Church of England", on the basis of a later publication thought to be J. Bradley Rhŷs, but not further identified. In 1811, with the support of James Mill, he started a publication entitled The Philanthropist. It published articles by Mill and by Jeremy Bentham. At the end of the Napoleonic Wars, it printed peace petitions.

In 1814, about a month after Napoleon was exiled to Elba, a Peace Committee met at Allen's house in Plough Court. A leading activist who attended was Joseph Tregelles Price. The idea of a "peace association" was in the air, supported by pseudonymous writers. One of those, certainly known to Allen, was the Unitarian William Pitt Scargill, associated also with Richard Phillips of The Monthly Magazine. In 1816, Allen became a founding member of the Society for the Promotion of Permanent and Universal Peace, after another meeting in his home. By 1823, however, his earlier trust in the Holy Alliance, and in particular Alexander I of Russia, to uphold peace in Europe, had given way to disillusionment.

== Other philanthropic works and interests ==
Allen's philanthropic work was closely allied to his religious beliefs, and began at an early age. In 1814 he became a partner in New Lanark. In the area of penal reform, prompted by Basil Montagu, he founded a Society for the Diffusion of Knowledge Respecting the Punishment of Death and the Improvement of Prison Discipline, in 1808.

=== Nutrition and self-sufficiency ===
In 1798 Allen set up a Soup Society in Spitalfields. His later interest in agricultural experiments was also aimed improving the nutrition and diet of ordinary people. Using only small plots, he carried out trials at Lordship Lane in Stoke Newington, and later put into practice some of his findings at the model agricultural settlement of Lindfield that he helped establish.

Allen's self-sufficient settlement was described in detail in his pamphlet Colonies at Home, where he stated "instead of encouraging emigration at enormous expense per head let the money be applied to the establishment of Colonies at Home and the increase of our national strength". At the time (1820s) the familiar colonies were in the Americas so the whole area became known as "America". This identity remains in the local street names and people's memories of the cottages in what is now America Lane.

=== Education ===
Allen was approached to help fund the ideas of Joseph Lancaster and his monitorial system, under which one teacher supervised several senior pupils, who in turn instructed many junior ones. In 1808 Allen, Joseph Fox and Samuel Whitbread co-founded the Society for Promoting the Lancasterian System for the Education of the Poor, from 1814 the British and Foreign School Society. In 1810 Allen became treasurer of the Society, whose aim was to open progressive schools in England and abroad.

In 1824 Allen founded the Newington Academy for Girls, also known as the Newington College for Girls, a Quaker school. The headmistress was Susanna Corder. Quaker views on women had from the beginning tended towards equality, with women allowed to minister, but still, at the time, girls' educational opportunities were limited. His school offered a wide range of subjects "on a plan in degree differing from any hitherto adopted", according to the prospectus. Here Allen was able to ensure that the new sciences were covered (he taught astronomy, physics, and chemistry himself), as well as many languages. Allen hired Ugo Foscolo, a revolutionary and poet, to teach Italian. The school was situated at Fleetwood House and made much use of Abney Park, the grounds in which it sat. It was also innovative in commissioning the world's first school bus, designed by George Shillibeer, to transport the pupils to Gracechurch Street meeting house on Sundays. The school was the subject of a poem by Joseph Pease, a railway pioneer who later became the first Quaker MP.

=== Evangelism and travel ===
From 1818 to 1820 Allen toured Europe with the Quaker evangelist Stephen Grellet. In 1818 they were in Norway. After his third wife's death, Allen travelled extensively. In 1840, for example, he spent five months in Europe with Elizabeth Fry and Samuel Gurney.

== Family life ==
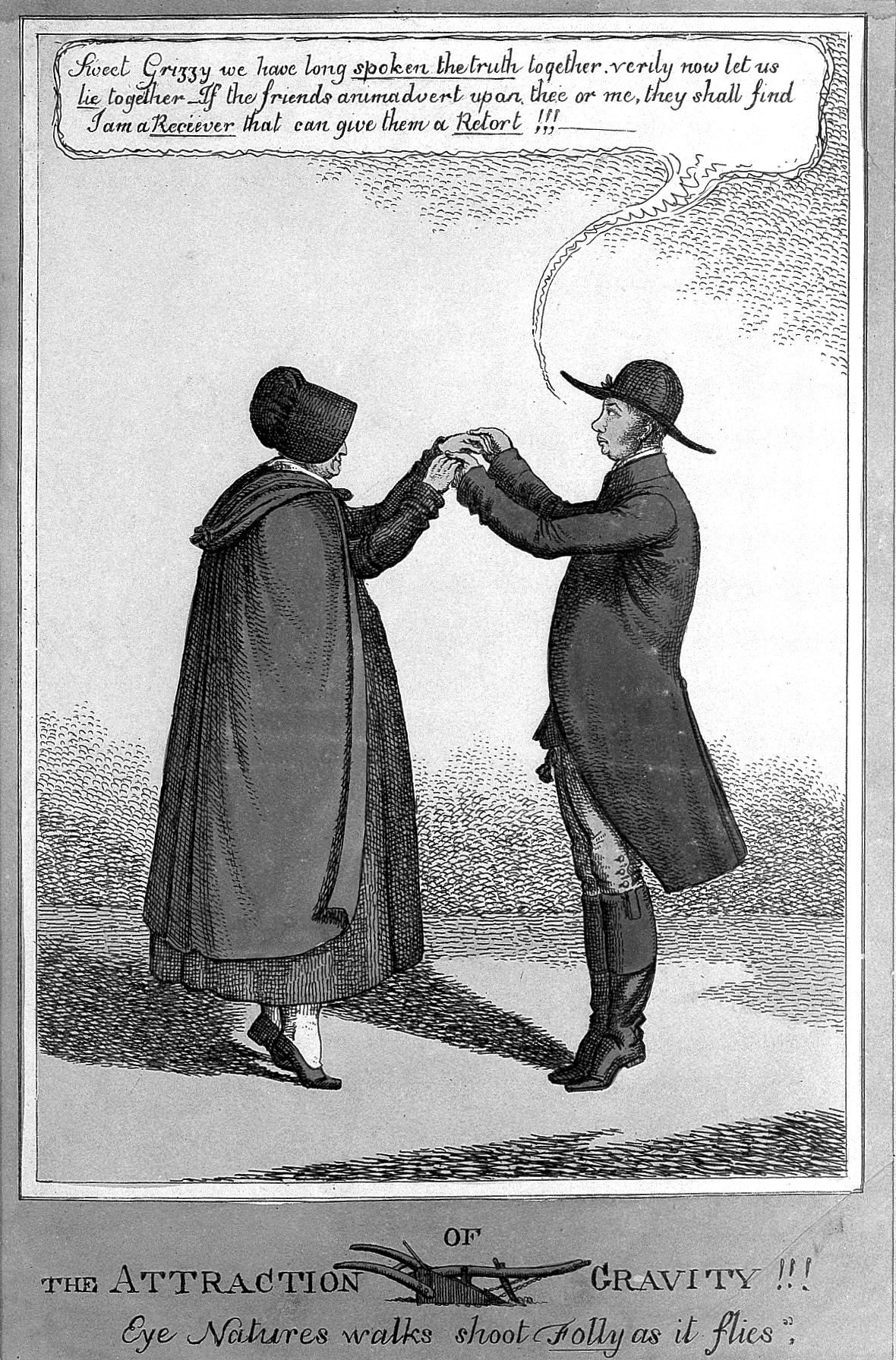
Caricature relating to Allen's marriage to Grizell Birkbeck

William Allen married Mary Hamilton in 1796. They had a daughter, who bore the same name. The mother did not recover from the childbirth, and died just two days later.

In 1806, Allen married for the second time. His new wife, Charlotte Hanbury was born in 1762. The couple visited the continent in 1816, but Charlotte died during their travels, leaving him to bring up his adolescent daughter Mary. In 1823, Mary, who married another Cornelius Hanbury, gave birth to a son, but she died nine days later.

William Allen married for the third time in 1827. Grizell was the eldest sister of another family of well-off Stoke Newington Quakers, of whom the best-known is Samuel Hoare Jr (1751–1825), one of the twelve founding members of the Society for the Abolition of the Slave Trade. She had been nurse and companion to her father, a merchant in the City of London, and then married Wilson Birkbeck in 1801. As a wealthy widow, she contributed to the 1824 foundation of Newington Academy for Girls, and three years later she and William Allen, both co-founders of this novel educational establishment, married. She was 72, and the marriage was greeted by a satirical cartoon entitled "Sweet William & Grizzell-or- Newington nunnery in an uproar!!!" by Robert Cruikshank.

Grizell Allen died in 1835.

== Death and memorial ==
William Allen died on 30 December 1843 and was buried in Stoke Newington, London, in the grounds of the Yoakley Road Quaker Meeting House. Today this has been replaced by a Seventh-Day Adventist chapel, the other half of its grounds becoming a small Council-maintained park for the nearby public housing estate.

== Sources and further reading ==
- Sherman, Rev. James (1851). Memoir of William Allen, F.R.S. Charles Gilpin.
- Claus Bernet (2007). "William Allen (English Quaker)". In Bautz, Traugott (ed.). Biographisch-Bibliographisches Kirchenlexikon (BBKL) (in German). Vol. 28. Nordhausen: Bautz. cols. 20–24. ISBN 978-3-88309-413-7.
- Margaret, Nicolle (2001). William Allen: Quaker Friend of Lindfield (1770–1843). Quakers. Nicolle, Margaret. ISBN 978-0-9541301-0-7.
- Doncaster, Hugh (1965) 'Friends of Humanity: with special reference to the Quaker William Allen', London: Dr William's Trust
- Cripps, Ernest C. (1927). Plough Court: The Story of a Notable Pharmacy 1715-1927. Allen & Hanburys, London.
- Chapman-Huston, Desmond; Cripps, Ernest C. (1954). Through a City Archway: The Story of Allen and Hanburys 1715–1954. John Murray, London. ASIN B0000CIZI9.
- Shirren, Adam John (1951). The Chronicles of Fleetwood House. A.J. Shirren, London. ASIN B0000CI4TT.
