= Abney Park =

Park in Stoke Newington, London, England

Coordinates: 51.5649°N 0.0781°W

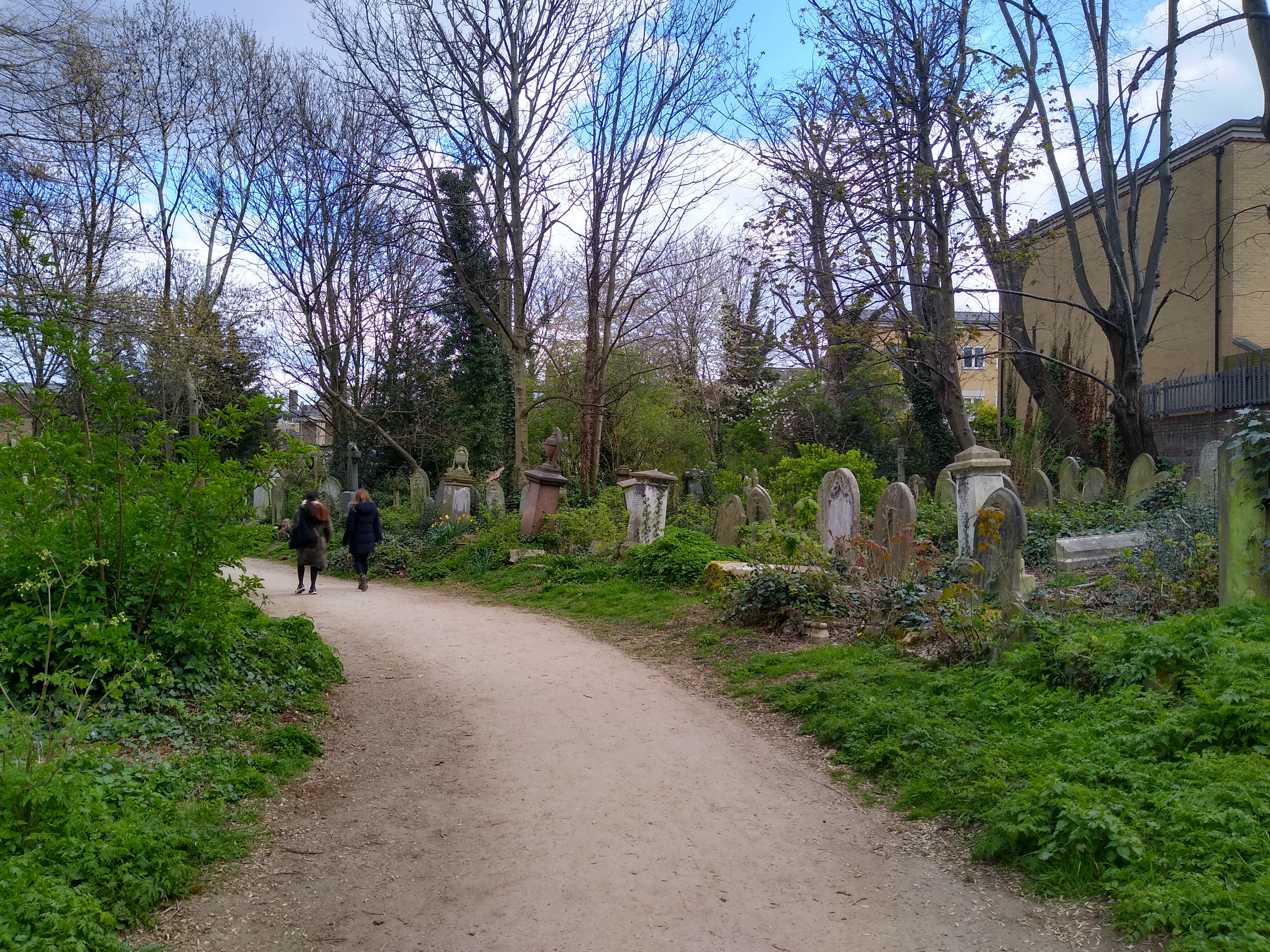
Abney Park (within the cemetery) in 2021

Abney Park is in Stoke Newington, London, England. It is a 13-hectare (32-acre) park dating from just before 1700, named after Lady Abney, the wife of Sir Thomas Abney, Lord Mayor of London in 1700 and one of the first directors of the Bank of England and associated with Isaac Watts, who laid out an arboretum. In the early 18th century it was accessed via the frontages and gardens of two large mansions: her own manor house (Abney House) and Fleetwood House. Both fronted onto Church Street in what was then a quiet mainly Nonconformist (non-Anglican) village. In 1840, the grounds were turned into Abney Park Cemetery, where 200,000 people were buried. Since 1978, the grounds have served as a cemetery open only to burials in a few remaining paid-up plots; an enclosed woodland park and events venue open to the public managed by the London Borough of Hackney, and since 1993, as a Local Nature Reserve, too.

== Parkland ==
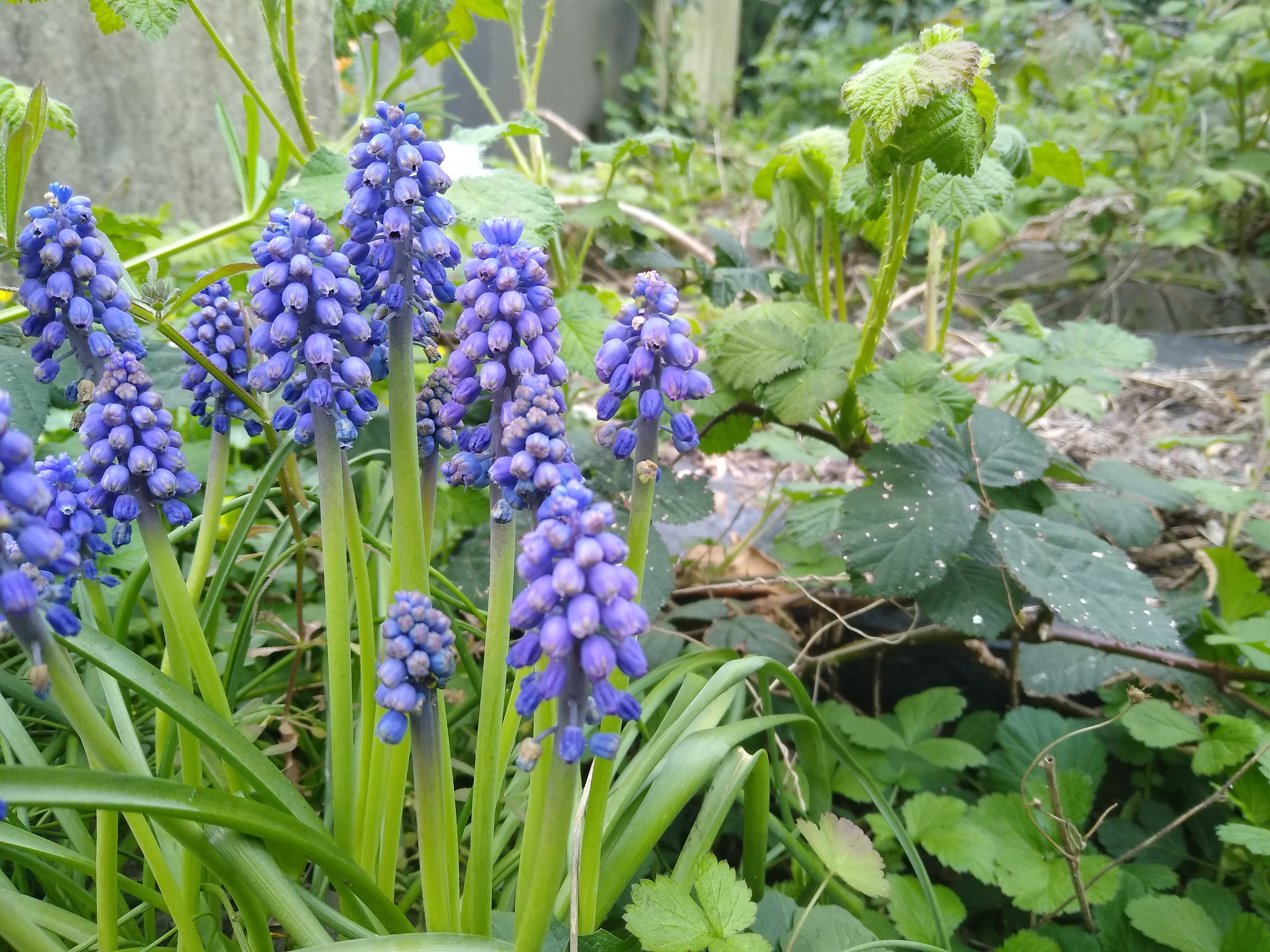

In the early 18th century, Lady Abney laid out Abney Park after inheriting the Manor of Stoke Newington in 1701 from her brother Thomas Gunston. Initially she and her husband Sir Thomas Abney lived there part-time, also living at his country residence in Hertfordshire. She began work on the park in those years.

After her husband's death in 1722, Lady Abney moved to Abney House full-time, becoming the first Lady of the Manor of Stoke Newington in her own right. She was said to be helped in designing the landscaping of the grounds as an English garden by the learned Isaac Watts, who had been a long-term house guest of her and her late husband, and continued to live in her household. The neighbouring Hartopp family of Fleetwood House, who leased the eastern part of the park to Lady Mary, also helped with the park.

Her improvements included planting of the Great Elm Walk and Little Elm Walk, which established shady walkways down to the island heronry of the Hackney Brook at the bottom of the park. Both wych elm and English elm were planted. The Hartopp family had already completed one of the early plantings of a Cedar of Lebanon tree in Great Britain, adjacent to an ornamental pond. This tree survived into the 1920s and is illustrated in many engravings of the period.

Other trees planted at an early date at Abney Park (either in the portion leased by Fleetwood House, or that attached solely to Abney House) included American Larch and Tulip Trees from the New World. The Nonconformists of Stoke Newington had strong connections to colonists in New England.

== Abney House ==
Abney Park was dominated by Abney House which was built in 1700. For some time in the early decades of the 19th century, it was the residence of James William Freshfield and his family.

In its final years, it was adapted for use as a Wesleyan Methodist training college (c.1838/9–1843). Rev. John Farrar was the Governor of the college. He was elected Secretary of the Methodist Conference on fourteen occasions and twice its president. When the Methodists moved into their first purpose-built college at Richmond, south of London in 1843, Farrar was appointed as the Classical Tutor. He worked there until 1857.

After 1843, Abney House was 'recycled' (broken up for sale as building materials) for the building trade of the rapidly expanding metropolis, as was common in the Victorian era.

== Fleetwood House ==
Fleetwood House was built in the 1630s for Sir Edward Hartopp. By marriage the estate passed to Charles Fleetwood, one of Oliver Cromwell's generals, and was named for him. It was later owned by various parties. It served as a meeting place for Dissenters and Nonconformists, for which residents Stoke Newington was known.

In the grounds was a third building, called the Summerhouse. From 1774, it was used as a summer residence by the family of young James Stephen (1758–1832). Although not a Quaker, he became closely involved with the abolitionist cause, which they supported. In 1800, he married Sarah Wilberforce, sister of his friend William, who visited Stoke Newington regularly. Between them, the two men drafted the Slave Trade Act 1807, to prohibit the international slave trade originating in Africa.

In 1824, Fleetwood House was adapted for use as a new Quaker school, known as Newington Academy for Girls (also Newington College for Girls). In a time when girls' educational opportunities were limited, it offered a wide range of subjects (including sciences) "on a plan in degree differing from any hitherto adopted", according to the prospectus. It commissioned the world's first school bus, designed by George Shillibeer.

One of the school's founders was William Allen, a Quaker active with the Society for Effecting the Abolition of the Slave Trade. His marriage to Grizell Hoare was the subject of a satirical cartoon, in which the school is referred to as the Newington Nunnery. Joseph Pease, later the first Quaker MP, wrote a doggerel verse praising Allen's marriage.

Fleetwood House was demolished in 1872. A fire station was constructed on the site.

== Sources ==
- Shirren, A. J. (reprint; 1951 1st ed.) The Chronicles of Fleetwood House. University of Houston Foundation: Pacesetter
- Whitehead, Jack (1983). The Growth of Stoke Newington. London: J. Whitehead
- Joyce, Paul (1984). A guide to Abney Park Cemetery. London: Hackney Society

== See also ==
- Abney Park Cemetery
- Temple Lodges Abney Park
- Abney Park Chapel
