= Mary Abney =

Mary, Lady Abney (née Gunston; 1676 – 12 January 1750) inherited the Manor of Stoke Newington in 1701 from her brother. The property lies about five miles north of St Paul's Cathedral in the City of London. She had a great influence on the design and landscaping of Abney Park, including the planting of the two elm walks that lead to Hackney Brook.

She is known for having sheltered Dr Isaac Watts, a Nonconformist known as the father of English hymnody for his hundreds of hymns, as a houseguest for 36 years. He was inspired by her park in his writing of hymns and poems.

== Background ==
The Manor of Stoke Newington, a small farming community about five miles north of St Paul's Cathedral and then considered beyond the boundaries of London, had been owned and managed directly by the cathedral until the early 17th century. After that, they granted it to a succession of private Lords of the Manor.

== Early life and marriage ==
Mary Gunston was born in 1676. Her brother, Thomas, became Lord of the manor of Stoke Newington in the late 1600s.

In 1700, she married Thomas Abney (1640–1722), who was 36 years her senior and that year Lord Mayor of London. He had business interests in the City of London and was knighted by King William. Sir Thomas was already leasing a mansion on the Theobalds estate at Cheshunt in Hertfordshire, and that is where they started their married life. They had a family together, including three daughters. In the custom of the time, the couple frequently invited guests to Theobalds. Their association with Isaac Watts, who became known as a hymnologist, became legendary. He was initially invited for a week to Theobalds, and became a semi-permanent member of their household, living with them for a total of 36 years.

In 1701, following the death of her brother, Thomas Gunston, Lady Mary Abney inherited the Manor of Stoke Newington. By the rights of marriage that applied at that time, the property formally passed to her husband for the duration of his life. The couple decided to live at both addresses, and split their lives between the villages of Cheshunt and their second home in Stoke Newington. Upon the title passing to Lady Mary and Sir Thomas Abney, she began to complete her late brother's new manor house at Abney Park; it was later known as Abney House. She had it done to suit her taste and ideas.

As Abney House was closer to London than Theobalds, the Abneys frequently stayed there with their family. Soon the household included long-term house-guest Dr Isaac Watts. The family also shared Abney House with a series of well-to-do tenants, who paid for various floors and parts of the house. This kept it homely, warm, and constantly lived-in during periods when the family lived in Hertfordshire. Lady Mary granted Watts sole use of a study room, the rooftop turret also called the observatory room, from which he could survey the heavens as well as the whole of Abney Park. His view extended northward of the village, as far as Woodberry Downs.

== Survey and landscaping; Lady of the Manor ==
At Abney Park, Lady Abney commissioned the first map and survey of the Manor of Stoke Newington. She is said to have planned much of the planting and landscaping of the park. Its two great elm avenues became favourite walks of Watts; they led to a secluded island heronry in the Hackney Brook, where he was inspired for his writings.

Following the death of her husband Sir Thomas in 1722, the widow Lady Abney became fully installed in her own right as the first Lady of the Manor. She was one of a few women who occupied such a position in early 18th-century English society.

In 1736, Lady Abney moved her household completely from her husband's mansion in Hertfordshire, choosing to live full-time at the more modest Abney House. She was joined in this by her unmarried daughter Elizabeth Abney and their long-term house guest Watts. In Stoke Newington, they had many neighbors who were Nonconformist and literary families.

== Links to the 'Religious Revival' ==
Lady Abney was of an Independent religious faith (known as Congregational, after the 1830s), as were her husband Sir Thomas Abney and long-term houseguest Dr Isaac Watts. Throughout the year when Sir Thomas held office as Lord Mayor, and Mary Abney was Lady Mayoress, they each had to practice occasional conformity to the Church of England, as required by law. Similarly, as Lady of the Manor, Mary Abney had to uphold the general conformity of the parish church of the Stoke Newington Manor.

Privately as an Independent, she was close friend of the religious revivalist Selina Hastings, Countess of Huntingdon. The Countess formed her own independent religious group within the independent Methodist movement, although working to compromise with the Anglican authorities. The Countess financed many revivalist causes, including the independent preacher George Whitefield. In her later years, she helped sponsor the visit to Britain of Olaudah Equiano, an African who was freed from slavery in the British colonies. He had become an abolitionist, and settled and married in England.

Lady Abney is mainly remembered as the sponsor of Isaac Watts, who lived in her household for 36 years. He is considered the first notable English hymnologist; he composed original works of Christian worship rather than using phrases from Biblical passages. His famous hymns include "Joy to the World" and "Our God, Our Help in Ages Past". Through this association, Lady Abney became part of a circle of many independent religious thinkers, including Philip Doddridge.

As one of Watts' main benefactors and likely his sole benefactor from 1734 until his death in 1748, Lady Mary enabled his work as a poet and scholar. His texts became standard in the New World as well as in Great Britain. Following Watts' death in 1748, Lady Mary had a memorial to him constructed at Bunhill Fields, which she co-financed with neighbour Sir John Hartopp.

== Death and charity ==
Following Mary Abney's death in 1750 at the age of 73, she was buried near her brother Thomas Gunston, beneath the chancel of Old Stoke Newington Church. (This is now called St Mary's Old Church and it overlooks today's Clissold Park.)

Her daughter, Elizabeth Abney (c.1704-1782), inherited The Manor of Stoke Newington, together with Abney House and Abney Park. She managed the estate, along with another at Tilford in the parish of Farnham, Surrey. Elizabeth Abney died a spinster aged 78 on 20 August 1782. In her will, she directed that her estates be sold and all proceeds be given to Nonconformist charities.

Newington Academy for Girls was a Quaker school established in 1824 in Fleetwood House, the immediate neighbour to Abney House. The students were allowed to use Abney Park. The opening of Abney Park Cemetery gave a new use to Lady Mary's landscaped grounds.

== Sources ==
- Whitehead, Jack (1990). The Growth of Stoke Newington
- Joyce, Paul (1984). A Guide to Abney Park Cemetery
- Shirren, A.J. (1951). The Chronicles of Fleetwood House
- Corporation of London (1902). History of Bunhill Fields Burial Ground
