= Thomas Bradley (physician) =

English physician

Thomas Bradley (1751–1813) was an English physician.

== Life ==
Bradley was a native of Worcester, where for some time he conducted a school in which mathematics formed a prominent study. About 1786 he withdrew from education, and, devoting himself to medical studies, went to Edinburgh, where he graduated M.D. in 1791.

He settled in London, and on 22 December 1791 was admitted licentiate of the College of Physicians. From 1794 to 1811 he was physician to the Westminster Hospital. In the practice of his profession he was not very successful.

Bradley died in St George's Fields at the close of 1813.

== Works ==
His doctoral dissertation was published as De Epispasticorum Usu in variis morbis tractandis. For many years he acted as editor of the Medical and Physical Journal. He published a revised and enlarged edition of Joseph Fox the younger's Medical Dictionary, 1803, and also a Treatise on Worms and other Animals which infest the Human Body, 1813.

On the Prospectus for Rees's Cyclopædia he was credited with writing articles on medicine.
