= Sarah Tuke Grubb =

English Quaker minister and author

- Born: Sarah Tuke; 20 June 1756; York, England
- Died: 8 December 1790; Cork (city), Ireland
- Other names: Sarah R Grubb; Sally Robert

Sarah Tuke Grubb (20 June 1756 – 8 December 1790), Quaker minister, writer and founder of a girls' school in Ireland.

== Life ==
Born to businessman William Tuke and his first wife Elizabeth Hoyland, Grubb was about 9 when her father married his second wife, Esther Maud. They were strong believers in Quaker principles. Her father founded three Quaker schools: Ackworth School, Bootham School, and Trinity Lane Quaker Girls' School during his life. Grubb started preaching in Quaker congregations when she was 22. She married Robert Grubb of Clonmel, Ireland in 1782 and while initially they lived locally to where she grew up, they returned to live in Ireland in 1787. The couple travelled extensively in Europe, as Quaker missionaries. They visiting several Quaker communities in their travels.

Grubb and her husband started a girls' finishing school in Clonmel, Ireland. The school was called the Suir Island School and later known as the Clonmel School. One of their teachers was Susanna Corder who went on to become the Headmistress of Newington Academy for Girls. Grubb died unexpectedly when she was 34.

== Bibliography ==
- A Serious Meditation: or, A Christian's Duty Fully Set Forth (1790)
- Some account of the life and religious labours of Sarah Grubb (1792 ed.). OL 23338641M.
- Account of the Schools at Ackworth and York, Observations on Christian Discipline, and Extracts from Many of Her Letters (1792).
- Biographical Sketches of the Lives and Public Ministry of Various Holy Women, (1825)
