= Isaac Robert Cruikshank =

British caricaturist (1789-1856)

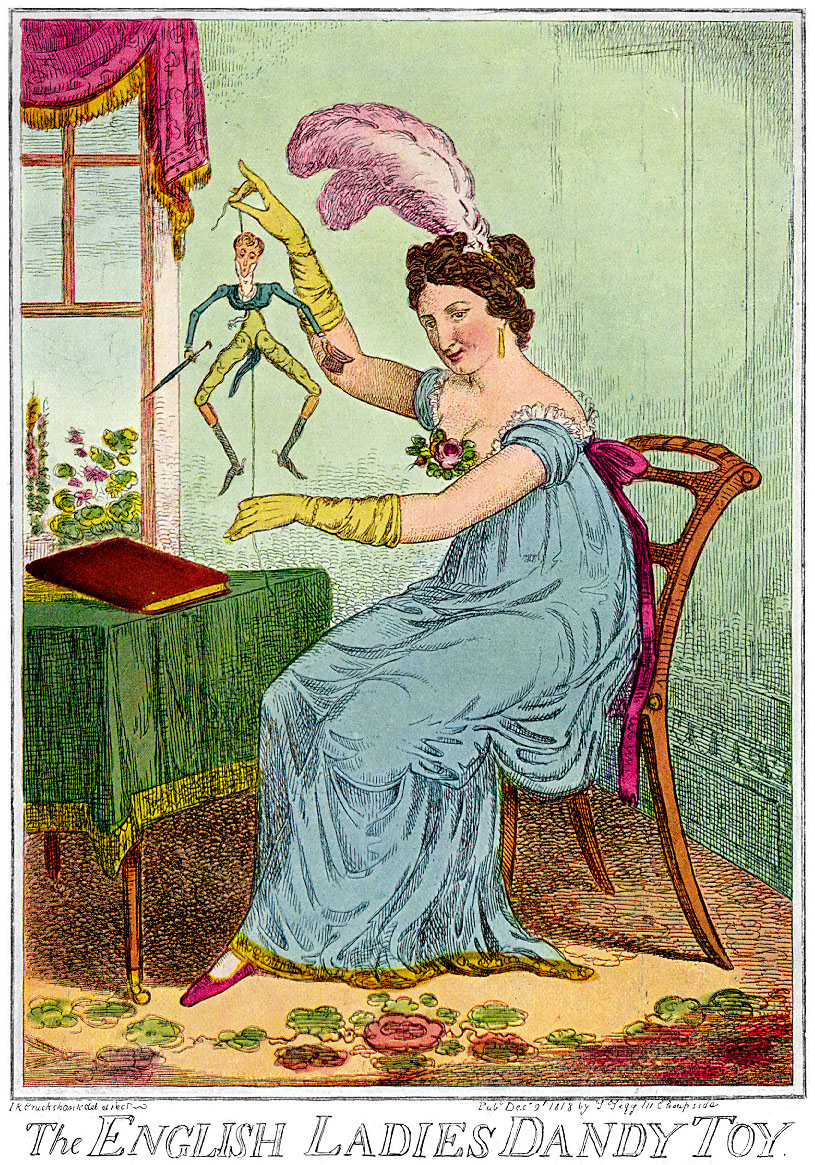
1818 caricature by I.R. Cruikshank

Isaac Robert Cruikshank, sometimes known as Robert Cruikshank (27 September 1789 – 13 March 1856), was a British caricaturist, illustrator and portrait miniaturist, the less well-known brother of George Cruikshank, both sons of Isaac Cruikshank. Just like them, he holds importance as a pioneer in the history of comics for creating several cartoons which make use of narrative sequence and speech balloons.

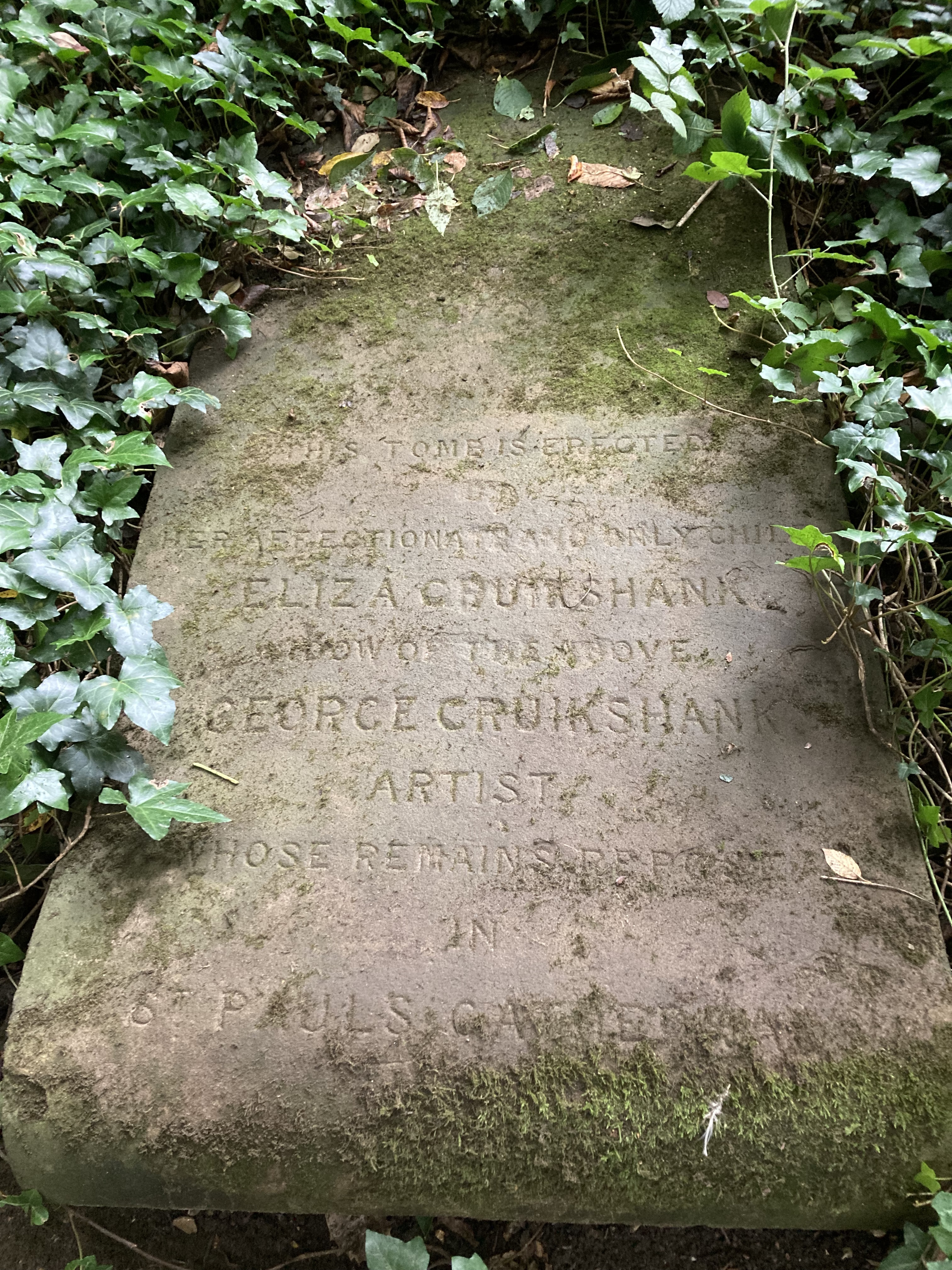
Grave of Isaac Robert Cruikshank in Highgate Cemetery

== Life ==
He was born in 1789 in Middlesex, where he and his brother George attended school in Edgware. Both brothers were interested in the theatre, and performed in dramas they had written themselves with their friend Edmund Kean. Isaac joined the Loyal North Britons, a volunteer military unit, rising to the rank of sergeant when the volunteers turned out in 1803. During adolescence, both brothers attended boxing and fencing matches, cock-fights, and numerous tavern contests.

Cruikshank gained a midshipman's commission in the East India Company's ship Perseverance. Midshipman Cruikshank did not get on with his captain, and returning on his maiden voyage he was deliberately left behind on St Helena. He arrived back in London in 1806 and shocked his family who were in mourning having been told that he was dead.

In the late 1820s, Cruikshank illustrated a number of notable books that were often sequels to previous successes to which he and his brother George had contributed. For example, George Cruikshank illustrated Points of Humour and Isaac Cruikshank illustrated Points of Misery. The brothers collaborated on a series of "London Characters" in 1827. Amongst his other illustrations are some notable ones for Miguel de Cervantes' classic novel Don Quixote de la Mancha. They are not as well known as those of William Hogarth or Gustave Doré; however, they can be viewed online at the Quijote Banco de Images. Another is a satirical comment on the marriage of the elderly Grizell, sister of Samuel Hoare Jr., to William Allen; the Quaker couple co-founded Newington Academy for Girls, which Cruikshank refers to as "Newington Nunnery".

Cruikshank caught bronchitis and died aged 66 at his lodgings at 13 Pleasant Row, Pentonville. He was buried in a family vault on the western side of Highgate Cemetery.

== Gallery ==
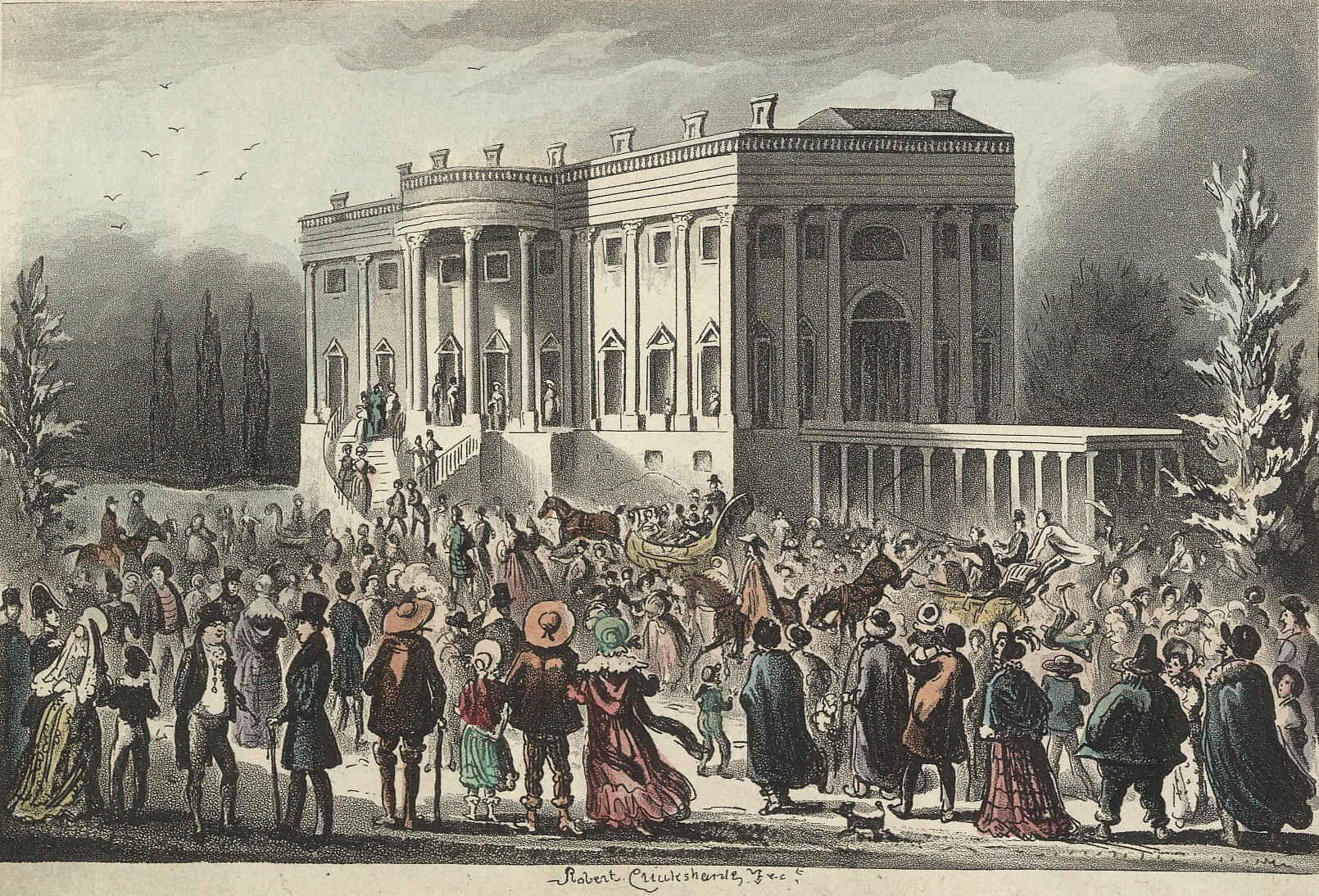
1829 caricature by Robert Cruikshank of US President Andrew Jackson's inauguration

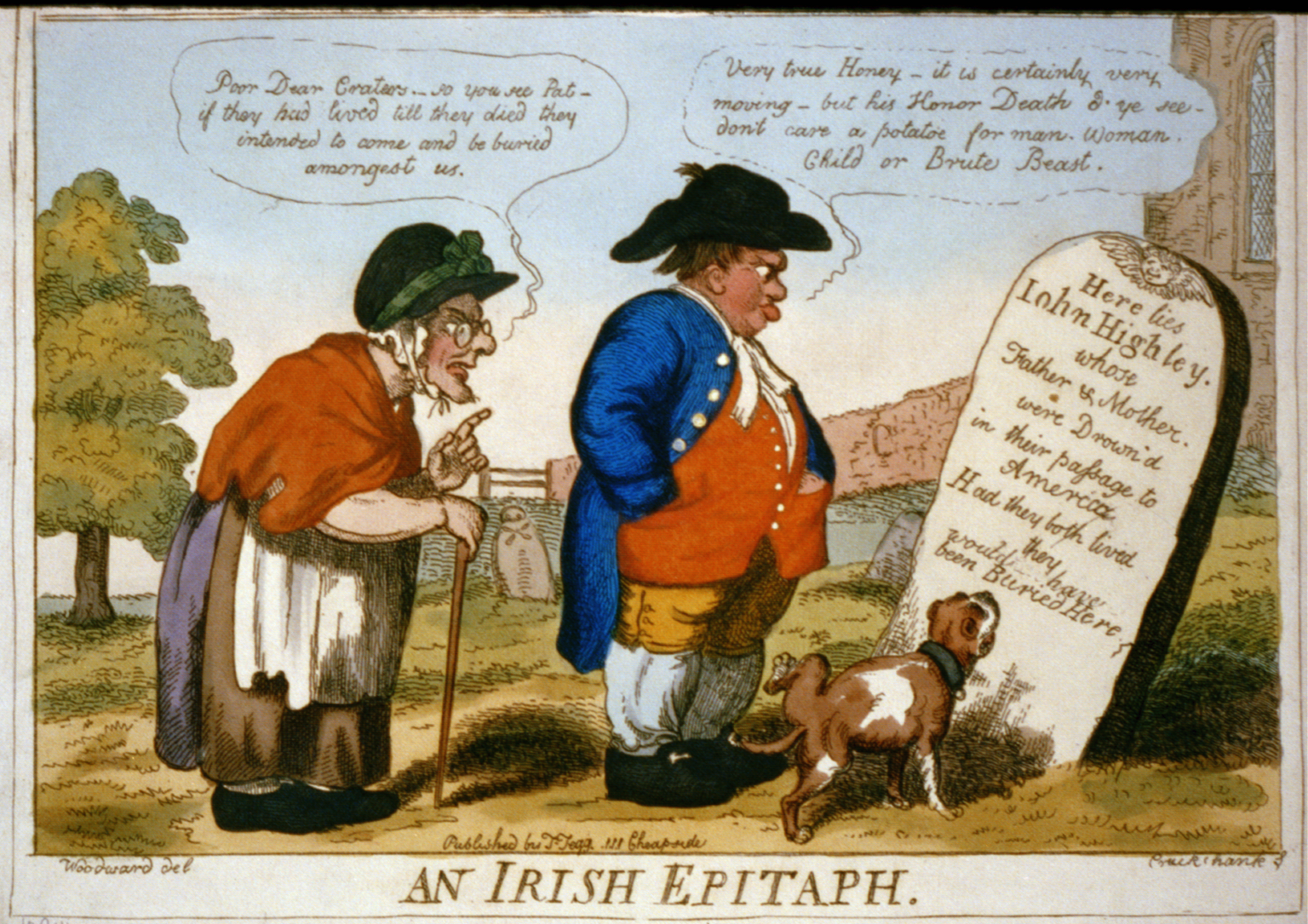
English caricature, at the expense of the supposed illogicality of the Irish, showing porcine man, old woman and dog looking at tombstone.

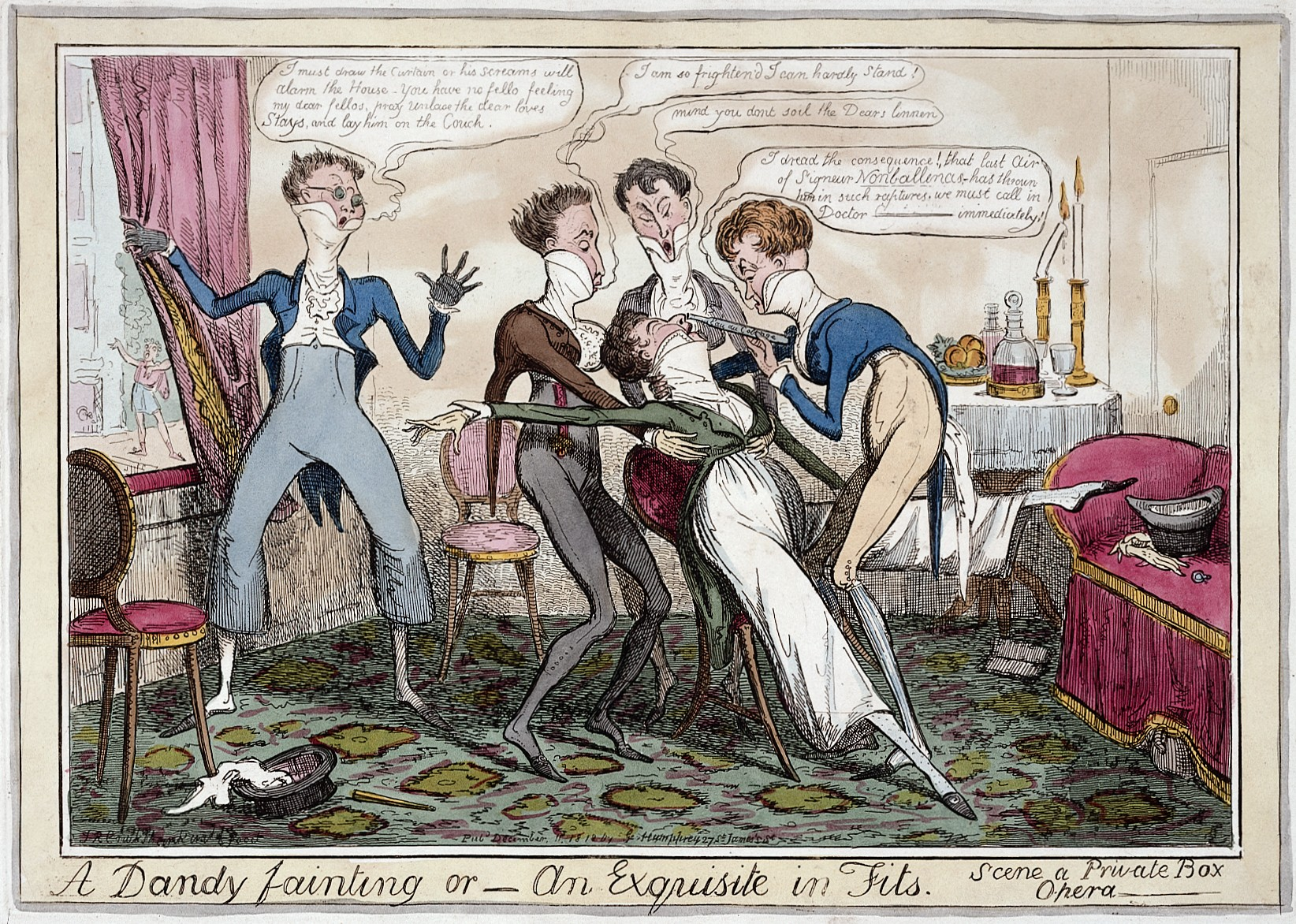
Dandies at the opera.

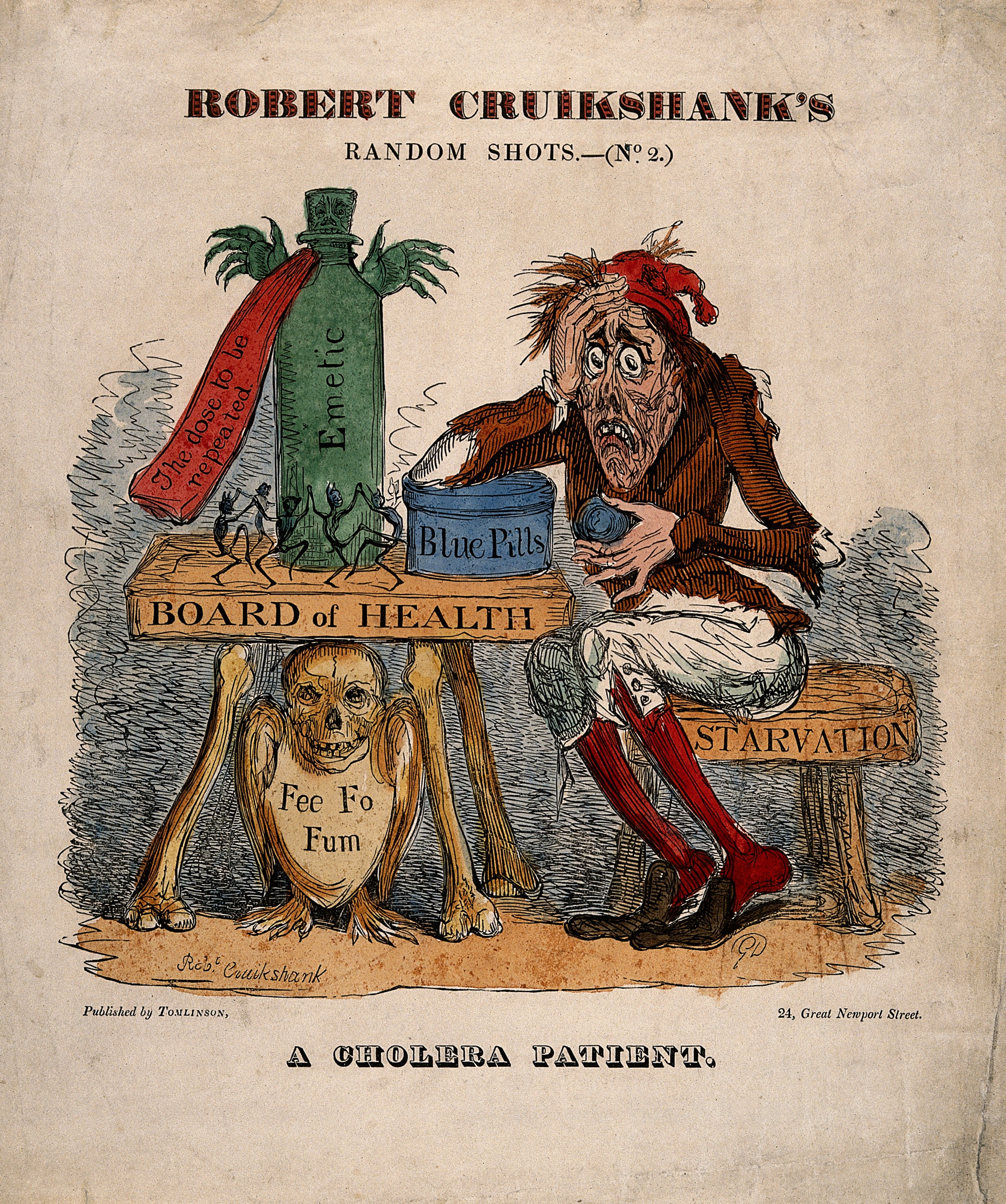
A cholera patient experimenting with remedies.
