= Thomas Abney =

English merchant and banker (1640–1722)

Sir Thomas Abney
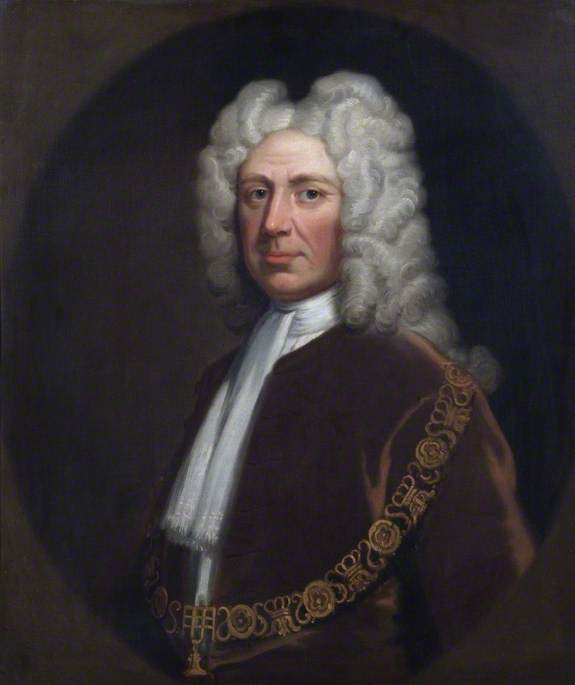

Lord Mayor of London
- In office 1700–1701
- Preceded by: Sir Richard Levett
- Succeeded by: Sir William Gore

Director of the Bank of England
- In office 1694

Personal details
- Born: January 1640 Willesley
- Died: 6 February 1722 (aged 82)
- Spouse(s): Sarah Caryl; Mary Gunston
- Occupation: merchant and banker

Sir Thomas Abney (January 1640 – 6 February 1722) was an English merchant and banker who served as Lord Mayor of London from 1700 to 1701.

== Biography ==
Abney was the son of James Abney and was born in Willesley, then in Derbyshire but now in Leicestershire. He was the younger brother of Edward Abney, later MP for Leicester. He was educated at Loughborough Grammar School, where a house is named after him.

Abney was apprenticed to William Thorogood, citizen and fishmonger of London, on 1 February 1658. In 1668, he took up the Freedom of the Fishmongers Company and also married Sarah Caryl who died in 1698. In 1694 he was one of the original Directors of the Bank of England and was elected a Sheriff of London. He was elected Lord Mayor of London in 1700 and was knighted by William III.

Abney was a pious man, and no business or festivity, was allowed to interrupt his religious observances. It was said that "on the day he became Lord Mayor, he withdrew from the Guildhall after supper, read prayers at home, and then returned to his guests". For thirty-six years he kept Dr Isaac Watts, as his guest and friend, at his mansion at Stoke Newington.

== Family ==
In 1700, Abney married Mary Gunston, who was surprisingly independent. It was Mary Abney who gave her name to Abney Park in Stoke Newington. Abney had a nephew also named Thomas Abney, who was a judge.

Civic offices
Preceded by Sir Richard Levett	Lord Mayor of London; 1700-1701	Succeeded by Sir William Gore
