= James Leach (composer) =

English composer

James Leach (baptised 25 December 1761, died 8 February 1798) was an English composer of nonconformist church music.

== Life ==
He was born in Wardle, Rochdale, Lancashire. He became a hand-loom weaver, but having studied music in his leisure hours, ultimately devoted himself entirely to the art. He early attained proficiency as a player, and was made a member of the king's band. He gained some distinction both as a teacher and choir-leader, and as a countertenor singer took a prominent part in the Westminster Abbey and other musical festivals.

He removed about 1795 to Salford, where he died from the effects of a stage-coach accident on 8 February 1798. He was buried in the cemetery of Union Street Wesleyan Chapel, Rochdale, where his grave is marked by a stone on which is cut his short-metre tune 'Egypt,' in G minor.
