= Joe Fox (footballer) =

Australian rules footballer

Personal information
- Full name: Joseph Patrick Fox
- Born: 20 January 1879; Camperdown, Victoria
- Died: 13 November 1948 (aged 69); Geelong West, Victoria
- Original team: Marylebone

Playing career^{1}
Years	Club	Games (Goals)
1903	South Melbourne	1 (0)
1904	Geelong	2 (0)
Total		3 (0)
- ^{1} Playing statistics correct to the end of 1904.

Joseph Patrick Fox (20 January 1879 – 13 November 1948) was an Australian rules footballer who played with South Melbourne and Geelong in the Victorian Football League (VFL).
