= Isaac Watts =

English hymnwriter and theologian (1674–1748)

The Reverend Isaac Watts
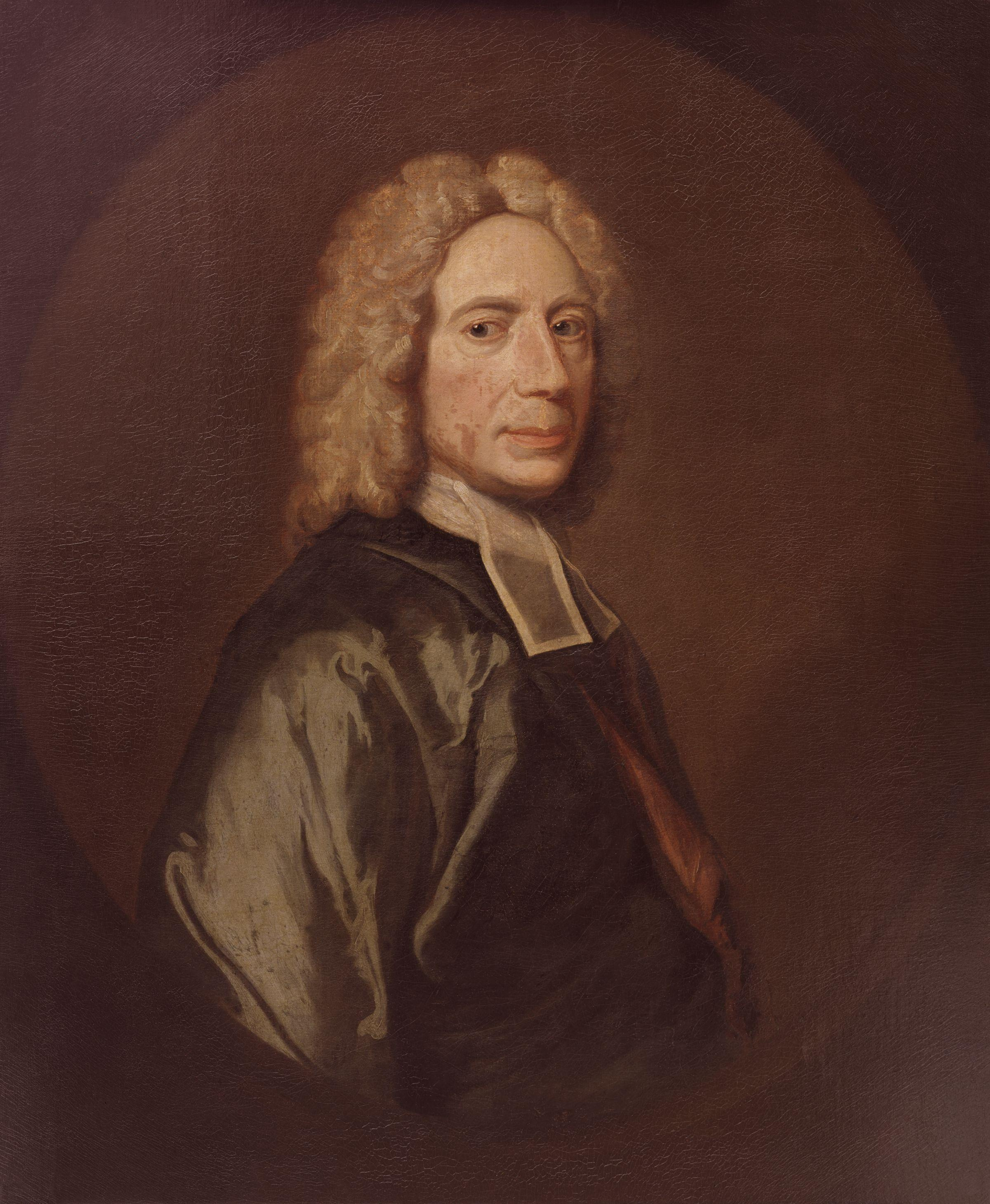
- Portrait by an unknown artist
- Born: 17 July 1674; Southampton, Hampshire, England
- Died: 25 November 1748 (aged 74); Stoke Newington, Middlesex, England
- Occupations: Hymnwriter, theologian
- Known for: "When I Survey the Wondrous Cross", "Joy to the World", "Our God, Our Help in Ages Past"

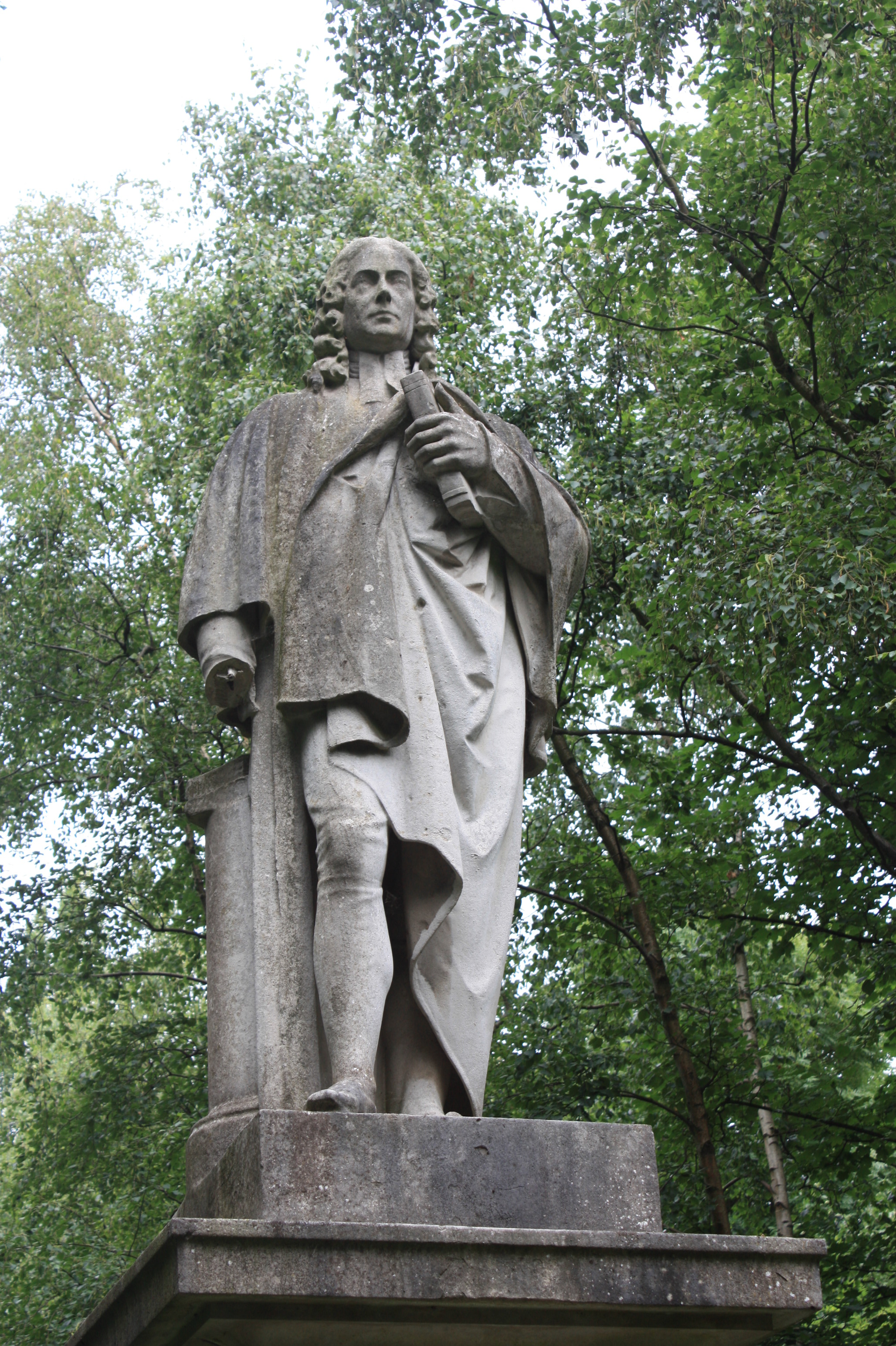
Statue of Watts, Abney Park Cemetery

Isaac Watts (17 July 1674 – 25 November 1748) was an English Congregational minister, hymn writer, theologian, and logician. He was a prolific and popular hymn writer and is credited with some 750 hymns. His works include "When I Survey the Wondrous Cross", "Joy to the World", and "Our God, Our Help in Ages Past". He is recognised as the "Godfather of English Hymnody"; many of his hymns remain in use today and have been translated into numerous non english languages.

== Life ==
Watts was born in Southampton, Hampshire, England, in 1674, the eldest of nine children of Sarah Watts and Isaac Watts Senior. He was brought up in the home of a committed religious nonconformist. His father, also Isaac Watts, had been incarcerated twice for his views. Watts had a classical education at King Edward VI School, Southampton, learning Latin, Greek, and Hebrew.

Watts displayed a propensity for rhyme from the age of seven. He was once asked why he had his eyes open during prayers, to which he responded:

A little mouse for want of stairs
ran up a rope to say its prayers.

He received corporal punishment for this, to which he cried:

O father, father, pity take
And I will no more verses make.

Watts could not attend Oxford or Cambridge because he was a nonconformist and these universities were restricted to Anglicans. He went to the Dissenting Academy at Stoke Newington in 1690. Much of the remainder of his life centred on that village, which is now part of Inner London.

After graduation, Watts took work as a private tutor and lived with the nonconformist Hartopp family at Fleetwood House on Church Street in Stoke Newington. Through them, he became acquainted with their immediate neighbours Sir Thomas Abney and Lady Mary. He eventually lived for a total of 36 years in the Abney household, most of the time at Abney House, their second residence. (Lady Mary had inherited the manor of Stoke Newington in 1701 from her late brother Thomas Gunston.)

Watts began preaching in 1698. He was called as assistant pastor of a large independent chapel in London, Mark Lane Congregational Chapel' after three years he became lead pastor of the congregation. At this church he helped train preachers, despite his poor health. He held religious opinions that were more nondenominational or ecumenical than was common for a nonconformist Congregationalist. He had a greater interest in promoting education and scholarship than preaching for any particular sect.

He published his first book of hymns and spiritual songs in 1707.

On the death of Sir Thomas Abney in 1722, his widow Lady Mary and her unmarried daughter Elizabeth moved all her household to Abney House from Hertfordshire, and she invited Watts to continue with them. He particularly enjoyed the grounds at Abney Park, which Lady Mary planted with two elm walks leading down to an island heronry in the Hackney Brook, and he often sought inspiration there for the many books and hymns that he wrote.

In 1728 Watts received a Doctor of Divinity diploma from Edinburgh in 1728.

Watts lived at Abney Hall in Stoke Newington until his death in 1748; he was buried in Bunhill Fields. He left an extensive legacy of hymns, treatises, educational works, and essays. His work was influential amongst nonconformist independents and religious revivalists of the 18th century, such as Philip Doddridge, who dedicated his best-known work to Watts.

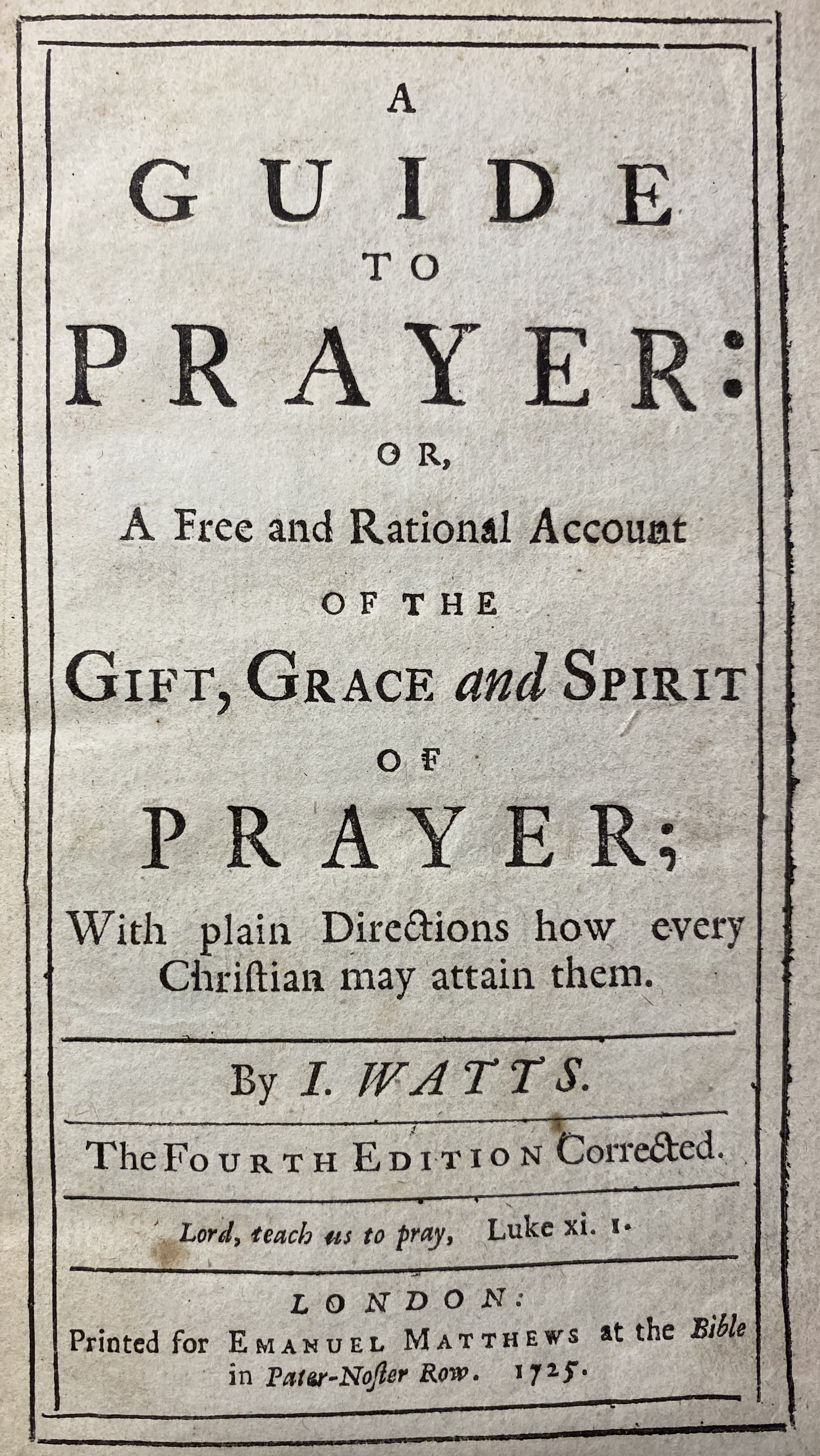
The title page of Watts's Guide to Prayer, fourth edition, 1725

== Watts and his hymns ==
Sacred music scholars Stephen Marini, Denny Prutow and Michael LeFebvre describe the ways in which Watts contributed to English hymnody and the previous tradition of the Church. Watts led the change in practice by including new poetry for "original songs of Christian experience" to be used in worship, according to Marini. The older tradition was based on the poetry of the Bible: the Psalms. According to LeFebvre, Psalms had been sung by God's people from the time of King David, who with a large staff over many years assembled the complete book of Psalms in a form appropriate for singing (by the Levites, during Temple sacrifices at the time). The practice of singing Psalms in worship was continued by Biblical command in the New Testament Church from its beginnings in Acts through the time of Watts, as documented by Prutow. The teachings of 16th-century Reformation leaders such as John Calvin, who translated the Psalms in the vernacular for congregational singing, followed this historic worship practice. Watts was not the first Protestant to promote the singing of hymns; however, his prolific hymn writing helped usher in a new era of English worship as many other poets followed in his path.

Watts also introduced a new way of rendering the Psalms in verse for church services, proposing that they be adapted for hymns with a specifically Christian perspective. As Watts put it in the title of his 1719 metrical Psalter, the Psalms should be "imitated in the language of the New Testament." Besides writing hymns, Isaac Watts was also a theologian and logician, writing books and essays on these subjects. Isaac Watts is credited by many with introducing hymns to the English churches when his Hymns and Spiritual Songs was first published in 1707. They are extensively used today due to his poetic gifts, but also because he interpreted the Old Testament using knowledge of the New. This set an example for later hymn writers. Isaac Watts explained his methods as follows: “Where the Psalmist describes religion by the fear of God, I have often joined faith and love to it. Where he speaks of pardon of sin through the mercies of God, I have added the merits of a Saviour. Where he talks of sacrificing goats and bullocks, I rather mention the sacrifice of Christ, the Lamb of God. When he attends the ark with shouting into Zion, I sing of the ascension of my Saviour into heaven, or His presence in His church on earth. Where he promises abundance of wealth, honor, and long life, I have changed some of these typical blessings for grace, glory, and life eternal, which are brought to light in the Gospel, and promised in the New Testament.”

== Logic and science ==
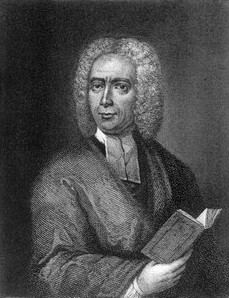
Isaac Watts

Watts wrote a textbook on logic which was particularly popular; its full title was, Logick, or The Right Use of Reason in the Enquiry After Truth With a Variety of Rules to Guard Against Error in the Affairs of Religion and Human Life, as well as in the Sciences. This was first published in 1724, and it was printed in twenty editions.

Watts wrote this work for beginners of logic, and arranged the book methodically. He divided the content of his elementary treatment of logic into four parts: perception, judgement, reasoning, and method, which he treated in this order. Each of these parts is divided into chapters, and some of these chapters are divided into sections. The content of the chapters and sections is subdivided by the following devices: divisions, distributions, notes, observations, directions, rules, illustrations, and remarks. Every contentum of the book comes under one or more of these headings, and this methodical arrangement serves to make the exposition clear.

In Watts's Logic, there are notable departures from other works of the time, and some notable innovations. The influence of British empiricism may be seen, especially that of contemporary philosopher and empiricist John Locke. Logic includes several references to Locke and his Essay Concerning Human Understanding, in which he espoused his empiricist views. Watts was careful to distinguish between judgements and propositions, unlike some other logic authors. According to Watts, judgement is "to compare ... ideas together, and to join them by affirmation, or disjoin then by negation, according as we find them to agree or disagree". He continues, "when mere ideas are joined in the mind without words, it is rather called a judgement; but when clothed with words it is called a proposition". Watts's Logic follows the scholastic tradition and divides propositions into universal affirmative, universal negative, particular affirmative, and particular negative.

In the third part, Watts discusses reasoning and argumentation, with particular emphasis on the theory of syllogism. This was considered a centrally important part of classical logic. According to Watts, and in keeping with logicians of his day, Watts defined logic as an art (see liberal arts), as opposed to a science. Throughout Logic, Watts revealed his high conception of logic by stressing the practical side of logic, rather than the speculative side. According to Watts, as a practical art, logic can be really useful in any inquiry, whether it is an inquiry in the arts, or inquiry in the sciences, or inquiry of an ethical kind. Watts's emphasis on logic as a practical art distinguishes his book from others.

By stressing a practical and non-formal part of logic, Watts gave rules and directions for any kind of inquiry, including the inquiries of science and the inquiries of philosophy. These rules of inquiry were given in addition to the formal content of classical logic common to textbooks on logic from that time. Watts's conception of logic as being divided into its practical part and its speculative part marks a departure from the conception of logic of most other authors. His conception of logic is more akin to that of the later, nineteenth-century logician, Charles Sanders Peirce.

Isaac Watts's Logic became the standard text on logic at Oxford, Cambridge, Harvard and Yale, being used at Oxford for well over 100 years. Charles Sanders Peirce wrote favourably of Watts's Logic. When preparing his own textbook, titled A Critick of Arguments: How to Reason (also known as the Grand Logic), Peirce wrote, "I shall suppose the reader to be acquainted with what is contained in Dr Watts' Logick, a book ... far superior to the treatises now used in colleges, being the production of a man distinguished for good sense."

Watts followed the Logic in 1741 by a supplement, The Improvement of the Mind. This also went through numerous editions and later inspired Michael Faraday. It was also widely used as a moral textbook in schools.

=== "Element" vs. "compound" ===
In Logic, Watts gave an early definition of chemical element, and contrasted "element" with chemical "compound" in clear, modern terms. He also provided an early list of elements then recognized by chemists - five in number - as he understood it. Watts did also, however, note the lack of consensus among chemists.

== Legacy, honours and memorials ==
Watts's tomb in Bunhill Fields

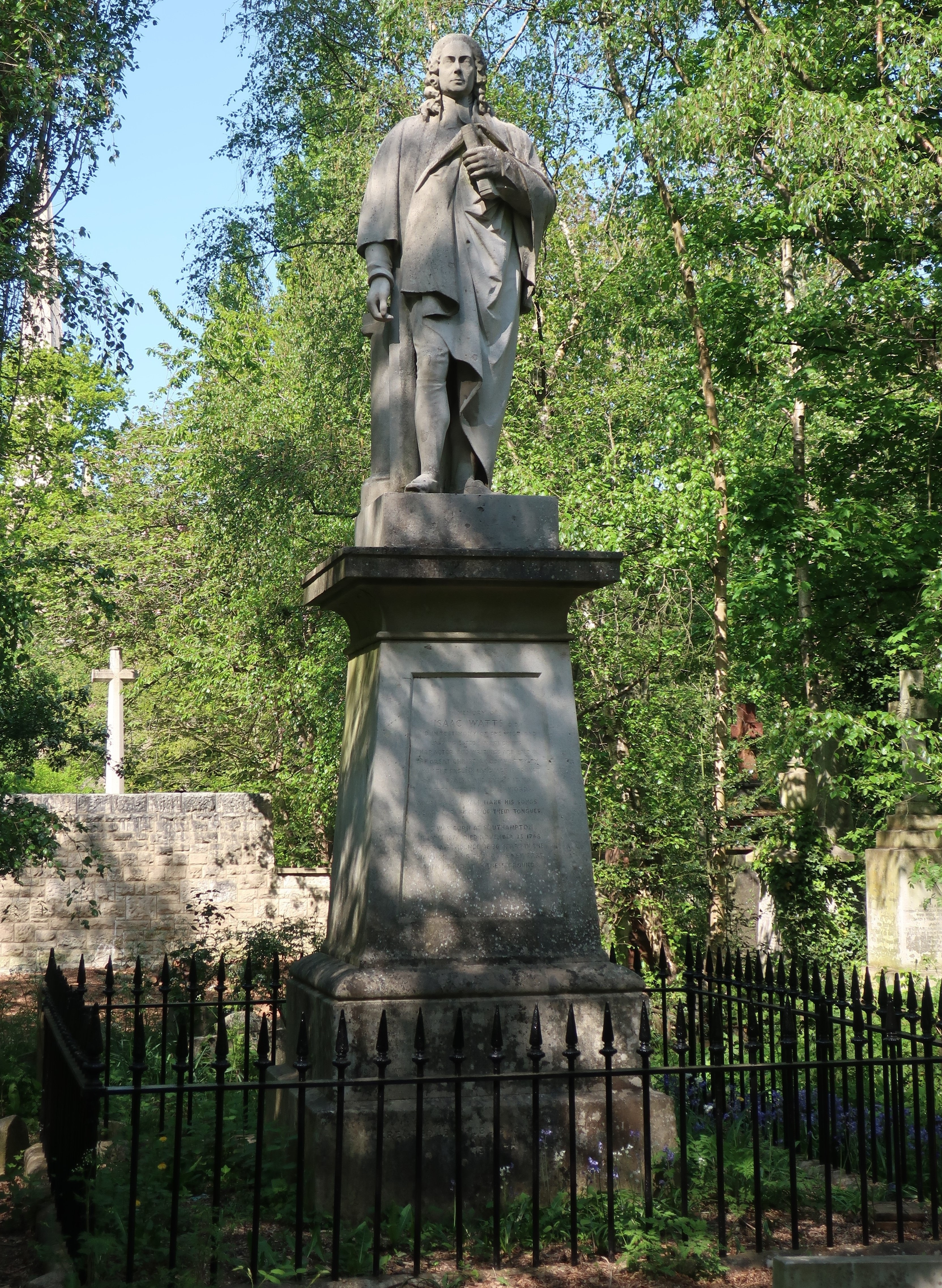
London's only public statue to Watts is in Abney Park Cemetery, Stoke Newington.

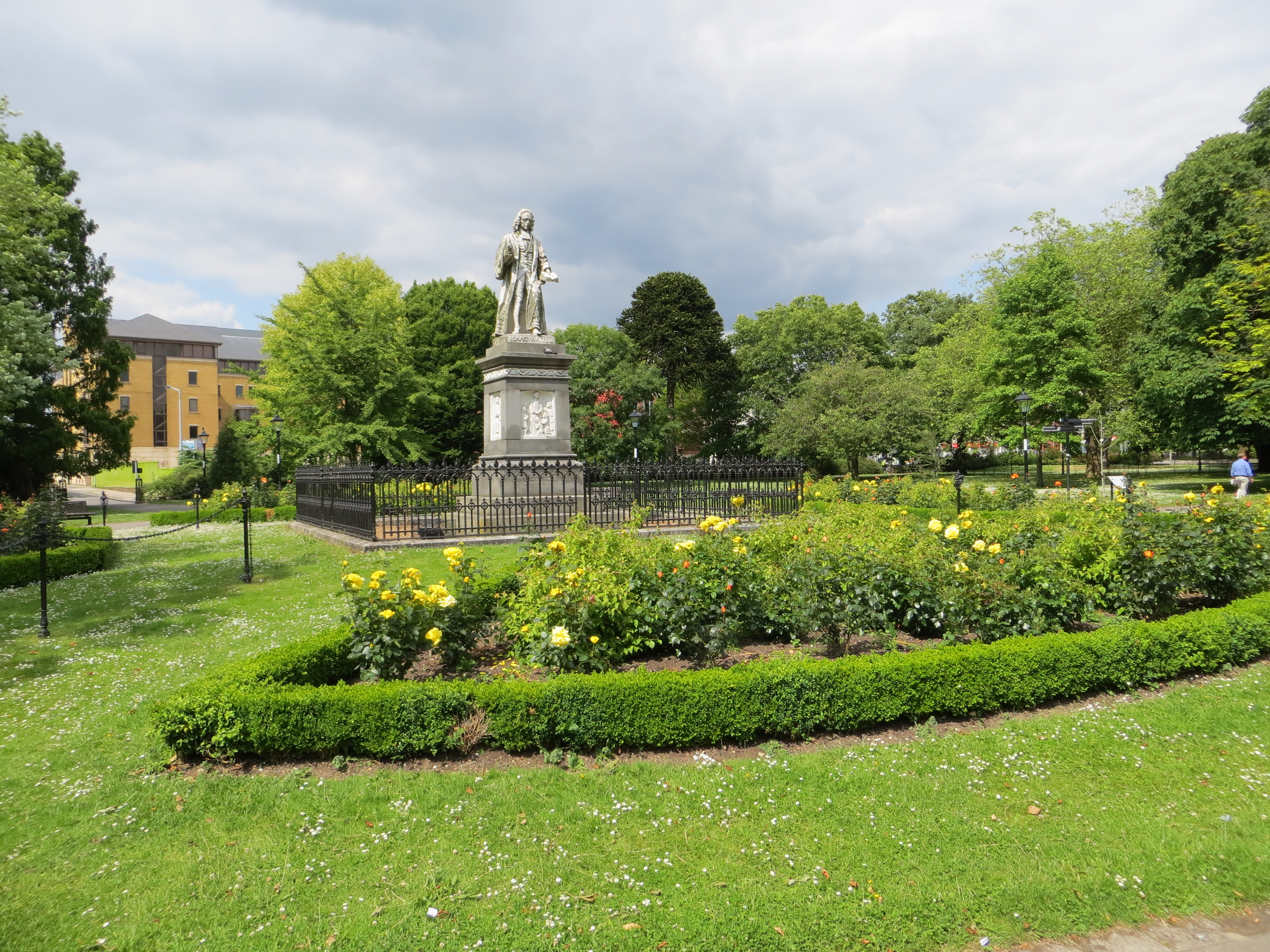
Statue of Watts in Watts Park, Southampton (city of his birth)

On his death, Isaac Watts's papers were given to Yale University in the Colony of Connecticut, which nonconformists (Puritans/Congregationalists) had established. King Edward VI School, Southampton, which he attended, named one of its houses "Watts" in his honour and has Our God, Our Help in Ages Past as its school hymn.

The Church of England and Lutheran Church remember Watts (and his ministerial service) annually in the Calendar of Saints with a commemoration on 25 November.

The earliest surviving monument to Watts is in Westminster Abbey; this was completed shortly after his death. His much-visited chest tomb at Bunhill Fields dates from 1808, replacing the original that had been paid for and erected by Lady Mary Abney and the Hartopp family.

Another early memorial may be lost: a bust to Watts commissioned on his death for the London chapel with which he was associated. The chapel was demolished in the late 18th century: remaining parts of the memorial were rescued at the last minute by a wealthy landowner for installation in his chapel near Liverpool, but it is not known whether the bust survives. Another bust is installed at the nonconformist Dr Williams's Library, in central London.

The first public statue stands at Abney Park, where Watts lived for more than 30 years at the manor house, and where he also died. The park later became Abney Park Cemetery, opened in 1840; and the statue of Watts was erected here by public subscription in 1845. It stands in Dr Watts' Walk, in front of the Abney Park Chapel, and was designed by the leading British sculptor, Edward Hodges Baily. A scheme for a commemorative statue on this spot had been promoted in the late 1830s by George Collison, who in 1840 published an engraving as the frontispiece of his book about cemetery design in Europe and America, and at Abney Park in particular. Collison's proposal was never commissioned, and Baily's design was adopted instead.

A later, rather similar statue was also funded by public subscription and erected in a new Victorian public park named after Watts in Southampton, the city of his birth. In the mid-nineteenth century, the Congregational Dr Watts Memorial Hall was built in Southampton and also named after him. It was lost to redevelopment after the Second World War, but the Isaac Watts Memorial United Reformed Church was built on the site.

In 1974, the City of Southampton commemorated the tercentenary of Watts's birth by commissioning the biography Isaac Watts Remembered, written by David G. Fountain, who like Watts, was a nonconformist minister from Southampton. The clock on Southampton Civic Centre chimes the tune of the opening line of 'Our God, our help in ages past', three times a day, at 8 am, 12 noon and 4 pm.

== Cultural or contemporary influences ==
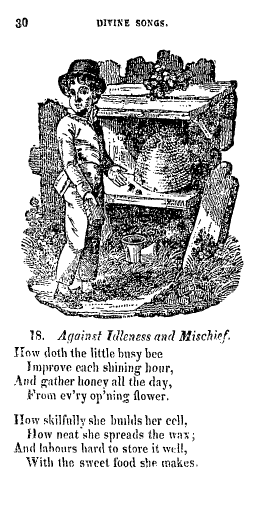
"Against Idleness and Mischief"

In his novel David Copperfield (1850), Charles Dickens has school master Dr. Strong quote from Watts's "Against Idleness and Mischief".

In Herman Melville's epic novel Moby-Dick (1851), a minor investor in the whaling ship Pequod is Charity Bildad, "a lean old lady of a most determined and indefatigable spirit, but withal very kindhearted" (chapter 20). Her brother, the captain, had forbidden the sailors to sing "profane songs" such as sea shanties, so she "placed a small choice copy of Watts in each seaman’s berth" (chapter 22).

One of Watts's best-known poems was an exhortation "Against Idleness and Mischief" in Divine Songs for Children. This was parodied by Lewis Carroll in the poem "How Doth the Little Crocodile", included in Chapter 2 of Alice's Adventures in Wonderland (1865). His parody is better known than Watts's original poem. The poem was also featured in the segment on the cartoon programme "Rocky and His Friends" called "Bullwinkle's Corner", in which Bullwinkle Moose recites poetry. In this case, the poem was titled "The Bee", with no author credit. A second example appears in Chapter 10 of Alice's Adventures in Wonderland, the poem "'Tis the Voice of the Lobster", which parodies the opening lines of "The Sluggard": "'Tis the voice of the sluggard; I heard him complain, / 'You have waked me too soon, I must slumber again.'"

The 1884 comic opera Princess Ida includes a punning reference to Watts in Act I. At Princess Ida's women's university, no men are allowed. Her father King Gama says that "She'll scarcely suffer Dr. Watts' 'hymns'".

A poem often referred to as "False Greatness" by Joseph Merrick ("The Elephant Man"), which was used in writing or "signature block" by Merrick, starting "Tis true, my form is something odd/but blaming me, is blaming God ..." is often (incorrectly) quoted or cited as a work by Isaac Watts. In fact only the last few sentences were penned by Watts ("False Greatness", book II – Horae lyricae 1743) starting "Mylo, forbear to call him bless'd / That only boasts a large estate ..."

== Works ==
=== Books written ===
- Hymns and Spiritual Songs (London: J. Humfreys, 1707)
- Horae Lyricae: Poems, Chiefly of the Lyric Kind (2nd ed. 1709)
- Divine Songs Attempted in Easy Language for the Use of Children (1715)
- Guide to Prayer (1715; 4th ed. corr 1725)
- Psalms of David: Imitated in the Language of the New Testament, and Apply'd to the Christian State and Worship (1719)
- Logick: or, the Right use of Reason in the Enquiry After Truth, with a Variety of Rules to Guard Against Error in the Affairs of Religion and Human Life, as Well as in the Sciences (1724)
- The Strength and Weakness of Human Reason: or, the Important Question about the Sufficiency of Reason to Conduct Mankind to Religion and Future Happiness, Argued Between an Inquiring Deist and a Christian Divine: and the Debate Compromis'd and Determin'd to the Satisfaction of Both (1731)
- Faith and Practice: Represented in Fifty-Four Sermons on the Principal Heads of the Christian Religion: Preached at Berry-street, 1733 (1739)
- The Improvement of the Mind: or, a Supplement to the Art of Logick: Containing a Variety of Remarks and Rules for the Attainment and Communication of Useful Knowledge, in Religion, in the Sciences, and in Common Life (1741)
  - Vol 1 Vol 2 at The Internet Archive (1768, 1773, 1787 edition)
- The Knowledge of the Heavens and the Earth Made Easy, or The First Principles of Astronomy and Geography, first edition, 1726; 1760 edition at Google Books
- The Doctrine of the Passions – Explain'd and Improv'd, [fifth edition] (1795)
- A Short View of the Whole Scripture History: With a Continuation of the Jewish Affairs From the Old Testament Till the Time of Christ; and an Account of the Chief Prophesies that Relate to Him
- An Essay on the Freedom of Will in God and in Creatures (attributed)

=== Hymns ===
Watts's hymns include:

- "Joy to the World" (based on Psalm 98, tune by an unknown composer using fragments from Handel, first published in England in 1833, popularized by American Lowell Mason)
- "When pain and anguish seize me, Lord"
- "Come ye that Love the Lord" (often sung with the chorus [and titled] "We’re marching to Zion")
- "Come Holy Spirit, Heavenly Dove"
- "Jesus Shall Reign Where’er the Sun" (based on Psalm 72)
- "Our God, Our Help in Ages Past" (based on Psalm 90)
- "When I Survey the Wondrous Cross"
- "Alas! and Did My Saviour Bleed"
- "Shall Wisdom Cry Aloud"
- "How Sweet and Awful Is the Place"
- "This Is the Day the Lord Hath Made"
- "'Tis by Thy Strength the Mountains Stand"
- "When I Can Read My Title Clear"
- "I Sing the Mighty Power of God" (originally entitled "Praise for Creation and Providence" from Divine Songs Attempted in Easy Language for the Use of Children)
- "My Shepherd Will Supply My Need" (based on Psalm 23)
- "Bless, O My Soul! the Living God" (based on Psalm 103)

Many of Watts's hymns are included in the Anglican Hymns Ancient and Modern, the Oxford Book of Common Praise, the non-denominational, evangelical Mission Praise, the Christadelphian hymnal, the Episcopal Church's Hymnal 1982, Evangelical Lutheran Worship, the Baptist Hymnal, the Presbyterian Trinity Hymnal, and the Methodist Hymns and Psalms. Many of his texts are also used in the American hymnal, The Sacred Harp, using what is known as the shape note notation used for teaching non-musicians. Several of his hymns are used in the hymnals of the Church of Christ, Scientist and the Church of Jesus Christ of Latter-day Saints.

== See also ==
- Africa (William Billings)
- Congregational church
- English Dissenter
- Independent (religion)
- Puritan
