= Joseph Fox the younger =

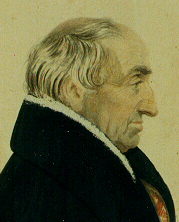
Joseph Fox

Joseph Fox (1758 – 25 February 1832) was an English apothecary and medical doctor.

== Life ==
He was the son of Joseph Fox the elder, and his wife Elizabeth Hingston; and the brother of Edward Long Fox. Another brother, Richard Fox M.D. of Falmouth (1764–1841), was another physician, and he had a physician son Joseph Fox M.D. of Falmouth, who is therefore possible to confuse with the Joseph Fox who died in 1832.

Fox, after practicing in Falmouth for some years as an apothecary, "acquired by marriage and his profession a small independence" and decided to try his fortune in London as a physician. He studied at Edinburgh and in 1783 graduated M.D. at St. Andrews. Settling in London, he was admitted L.R.C.P. in 1788, and in 1789 was elected physician to the London Hospital. In 1792 the Royal College of Physicians of Edinburgh made him a fellow.

When Fox settled among them, Londoners of the Society of Friends were helpful. It was through the influence of Thomas Smith, a banker, of Lombard Street, London, a relative through the Tregelles family (see also Edwin Octavius Tregelles), and other wealthy men, that he became Physician to the London Hospital. This was a period of acrimony at the hospital, in its elections, and both Fox, in post for 11 years, and his successor were regarded as "of no particular election", owing their position to non-medical influence; medical merit was only rewarded, according to the staff view, with the election of John Yelloly, after that of Isaac Buxton.

In 1800 Fox resigned his post at the London Hospital, in favour of his private practice. Having made a fortune enough to retire on, he left London, having disposed of the practice to Dr. Frampton. He went to Falmouth. In retirement, he lived first in his cottage at Mylor, across the water from Falmouth. "But there he was soon found out and drawn into practice, working very hard as a country doctor".

Fox was doctor to a merchant ship's Captain, Christopher Buckingham, and to his wife, Thorazine, who lived in Flushing. He brought all their children into the world, and one of them later wrote that at the age of six he was sent to Trevissome Farm "to be' inoculated for the small-pox". If he is correct this would be 1792. He continues "the operation was performed by a worthy Quaker, Dr Fox of Falmouth, and I was for the puncture, which was so suddenly and unexpectedly made that I was saved all the pain of apprehension which is generally greater than that of the wound itself."

In 1798 Captain Yescombe of the Packet Service advertised Wood cottage at Greatwood for sale, a property which lay near the ferry crossing at Mylor Creek. Joseph purchased the house, living there for many years. His last years were spent in Plymouth. He was buried in Charles Church Yard, Plymouth.

== Conversion ==
"From the Devonshire House monthly meeting minutes Joseph's wife Eizabeth Peeters had transferred her Friends' Membership from London to Cornwall but there was no mention of Joseph, although he appeared in these minutes in the early 1790s. In autumn 1798, Joseph asked to be disowned by the Society of Friends when he "acknowledged his being convicted in his own mind of the inconsistency of his conduct with the religious principles" and denounced his moral conduct in being the father of an illegitimate child.

== Works ==
Fox planned, and partly compiled, A New Medical Dictionary (1803/4). The publishers had it completed by Thomas Bradley. There was an American edition, The Philadelphia Medical Dictionary, by John Redman Coxe.

== Family ==
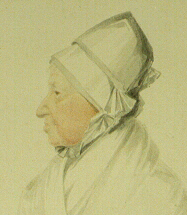
Elisabeth Peeters

Joseph Fox (1758–1832) was the son of Joseph Fox (1729–1785) and Elisabeth Hingston (1733–1792). In Plymouth he married in 1780 his second cousin Elisabeth Peters (St Dennis, 5 Dec 1751 – Mylor, 1830). They shared the same great–grandparents Philipp Debell (1657–?) and Ann Soady (?–1742).

Joseph Fox had four children: according to Burke, these were not with Elisabeth Peters. They were:

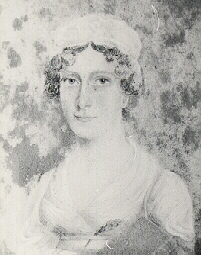
Emily Sleeman-Fox

1. Emily (after March 1792 – Newton Abbott, South Devon, 8 March 1866) married Philip Sleeman (1791/2 – 31 Mar 1869), brother of William Henry Sleeman.
2. Mary James (Abt 1796 – London, 27 Mar 1866) who married abt 1825 Robert Deeble Mitchel, MD (Redruth, Cornwall, ca 1794 – Boulogne sur Mer, Fr, 2 Nov 1843), issue.
3. Sophia James (1798 – London, 10 Dec 1875) who died unmarried
4. Charles James (London, 25 Jan 1799 – London, 12 May 1874 married Windsor 12 Aug 1828, Anne Mary Guion (London, 4 Nov 1798 – London, 12 Mar 1876), daughter of Capt. RN Gardiner Henry Guion and Polini from Corsica. (Issue in Canada and the Netherlands)

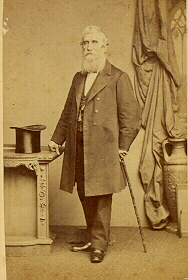
Dr Charles James Fox

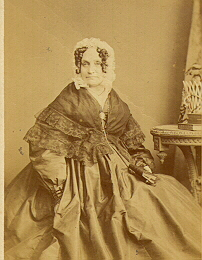
Anne Mary Guion

Joseph was witness to the marriage of his son Charles James on 12 Aug 1828

The mothers of Fox's children are unknown. Some could be children of a daughter or a sister of Richard James. Emily was brought up as a Quaker, became Protestant and afterwards joined the sect of Selina Hastings, Countess of Huntingdon. The other three were sent to France and brought up as Catholics by "De Tremouille", a French lady.

In the Revised genealogical account of the various families descended from Francis Fox of St. German's, Cornwall, privately printed London, 1872 Joseph and Elizabeth are mentioned on the chart and on the pages 12/13 (Fox of Falmouth) and 19 (Debell of Looe). On pages 13 is stated that "there was not any issue of the marriage"

=== Personal dealings ===
Data on Joseph Fox and his dealings with his lawyers in Plymouth can be found in the Bayly Bartlett papers. He had real estate dealings in London in 1792 with a James family. Thomas Were (a Quaker) is also named in this agreement, regarding a property on the west side of Finsbury Place at the corner of Ropemaker's Street in the Parish of St Luke in the County of Middlesex. Fox seemed to be taking long leases in this new property development real estate.

In 1832 Fox also took a 99-year lease on a house at Number 1, The Bank (St) in Falmouth, Cornwall. This dwelling was part of the marriage settlement of Emily (Fox) Sleeman. For one of the London properties, he commissioned a builder in October 1794, to build a house for him at the South West corner of South Street near Finsbury Square, to be completed by August 1795. This house may have been intended for his own use or may have been the residence of his natural (illegitimate) children and their mother.

Richard James, of Esher Surrey, died in 1799. He was a wine manufacturer in London. There is an entry in the 1794 directory of London and Westminster and the borough of Southwark – James & Were – British Wine Manufacturers, Finsbury Place. He had a daughter Elizabeth who was married to a William Reave by 1799. His sons Joseph and Benjamin inherited his wine business and had real estate dealings (a quitclaim) with Joseph Fox, of Plymouth, Devon, but late of Mark Lane, London.
