= Alfred Tylor =

- Born: January 26, 1824
- Died: December 31, 1884 (aged 60); Carshalton, London, England
- Spouse: Isabella Harris
- Scientific career
- Fields: Geology

Alfred Tylor (26 January 1824 – 31 December 1884) was an English geologist.

== Life ==
He was the second son of Joseph Tylor, brassfounder, by his wife, Harriet Skipper, and elder brother of the anthropologist Edward Burnett Tylor. His grandfather set up the colliery around which the village of Tylorstown grew in the Rhondda Valley, Wales.

His parents being members of the Society of Friends, he was educated in Quaker schools near London. Although he was interested in science, the early death of his father compelled him to devote himself to his business, which he entered in his sixteenth year. He studied in spare time, attaching himself to St. Bartholomew's Hospital to improve his knowledge of anatomy. He frequently visited the continent, going to Italy, Spain, and Russia, both for business and for scientific purposes with other geologists. During the latter part of his life he lived at Carshalton. He died on 31 December 1884, on his return from a visit to America. In 1850 he married Isabella Harris of Stoke Newington, who survived him with two sons and four daughters; their eldest child was Joseph John Tylor, the engineer and Egyptologist.

Tylor was also a friend of acclaimed Victorian critic, John Ruskin, who valued Tylor's geological skills and enjoyed his company. In 1871 Ruskin enrolled the Tylor family in his project to 'cleanse' a spring and pool of the River Wandel near the Tylors' house, and Isabella Tylor became very active in this project in the coming years. Juliet Tylor became a Companion of Ruskin's Guild of St George.

== Works ==
Tylor paid attention to recent geological history, the subject of the majority of his thirteen papers. He maintained that the late glacial period was followed by one of exceptional rainfall, for which he proposed the name of pluvial. His major books were:

- On Changes of Sea Level, London, 1853.
- Education and Manufactures, London, 1863, (reprinted from a report connected with the exhibition of 1851, where he was a juror).
- Colouration in Animals and Plants, ed. S. B. J. Skertchly, London, 1886.
