= Temple Lodges Abney Park =

Coordinates: 51.5649°N 0.0781°W

Abney Park Temple Lodges
- Interactive map of the Abney Park Temple Lodges area

General information
- Architectural style: Egyptian Revival
- Location: London, England

Design and construction
- Architect: William Hosking

The Abney Park Temple Lodges are gatehouses to Abney Park Cemetery designed by William Hosking, to Abney Park in the London Borough of Hackney. The lodges are composed mainly of stone building materials and designed in an Egyptian Revival style, which was unusual for the time period of which the lodges were conceptualized. Augustus W N Pugin was famously against the design of the lodges due to them being non-European despite public fascination of Egyptology at the time.

== History ==
The Abney Park Temple Lodges (1838–40) were designed by William Hosking as entrance lodges to the historic 18th century parkland associated with Isaac Watts and Lady Mary Abney. The buildings were added to the parkland estate on its becoming laid out as the Congregationalists' novel non-denominational garden cemetery, arboretum and educational institution.

Rather than the usual forbidding high walls of contemporary cemetery design, William Hosking was briefed to work up a visually prominent design that would occupy a considerable frontage expanse. This provided open, inviting, views into the park, for appreciation of its botanical richness and landscape beauty since the Abney Park Cemetery project was, more so than any other of the ring of cemeteries at the time, designed as an early semi-public London park as well as a London burial ground.

== Architecture ==
For buildings forming part of an English garden cemetery of the period, an unusual choice of architectural style was made at Abney Park: Egyptian Revival style. It had not previously been used on a large scale for a park or cemetery frontage; and for a prominent entrance onto one of the main roads into London, it was clearly designed to catch the eye and be symbolic of the novelty of a wholly non-denominational approach to cemetery layout and design, and the remarkable intention of also establishing a semi-public park.

William Hosking was already familiar with Egyptian temple architecture, as evidenced by his contributions to the Encyclopædia Britannica, but he took expert advice from fellow antiquarian scholar Joseph Bonomi junior to achieve higher standards of detailing for the hieroglyphics and other Egyptian facets of the final design.

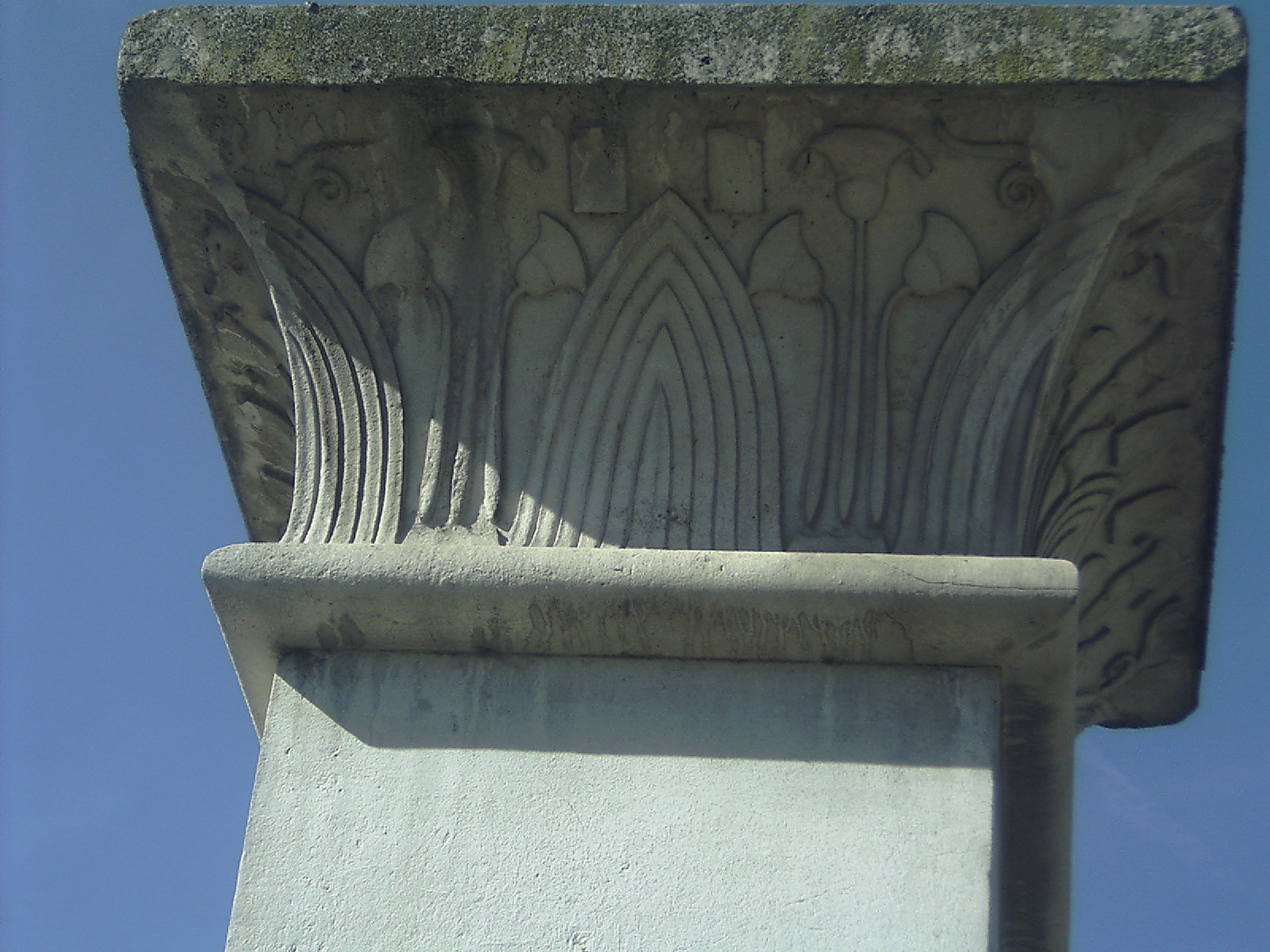
Detail of Hosking, Bonomi, Loddiges' and Collisons' Egyptian Revival entrance showing its botanical approach using Lotus flower heads and sepals (photo: September 2005)

Hosking's carefully scaled "Egyptian-Revival" entrance ensemble comprised a carefully studied Temple Lodge or Lodges (with twin North and South components), with dramatic pylons, gates and railings in between. It is the earliest example in European architecture of a cemetery building (as opposed to monuments or gates) being designed and built in "Egyptian Revival" style.

The presence of George Loddiges, nurseryman and scientist, on the garden cemetery's design team, may account for Hosking's final choice of the Sacred Lotus flower for the decorative motifs at the tops of the Abney Park entrance pylons; a plant closely associated with the River Nile and Egyptian religious symbolism. Botanical iconography was evidently preferred to "sphinxes" and other populist or polychromatic Egyptian revival designs; and from Bonomi's accurate studies and drawings in Egypt, both the "flower heads" / "seed heads" and petals/sepals of the Sacred Lotus could be perfectly carved as pylon decorations that survive to this day (see photo).

Public fascination with Egyptology was then in vogue, and with Bonomi's help, and the Cemetery Company's close control over the brief, Hosking is said to have produced "Egyptial Revival" entrance features more perfectly, and on a more complete scale, than at Mount Auburn Cemetery where the concept had originated. Importantly, Mount Auburn Cemetery, from which Abney Park's client representative, George Collison took much of his inspiration, still at that time had only a temporary Egyptial Revival structure (made of dusted wood and sand). Its permanent "Egyptian Revival" structure was not built until two years after the Temple Lodges at Abney Park were completed, more optimistically, in stone. In England only a small-scale "Egyptian Revival" gateway had yet been built at a cemetery for Nonconformists near Sheffield in 1836, William Hosking becoming the first to employ the style for English park or cemetery buildings.

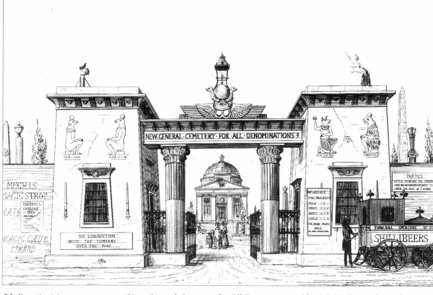
Attempt at Comical Caricature of the "New General Cemetery for All Denominations" with Egyptian Design at Abney Park [PUGIN (1843), An Apology for the Revival of Christian Architecture

]

Pugin's caricature of the gates includes a "Shillibeer's Funeral Omnibus". George Shillibeer's invention was arousing some debate in 1843, as had the Newington Academy for Girls in its day (for which he had designed the world's first school bus), and now the new nondenominational park cemetery. All were seen by parts of London society as iconoclastic.

The appropriate architectural style for a place of burial was then a hotly debated issue. Not long before Hosking's commission at Abney Park, the neoclassical style (favoured in Georgian times) had been commissioned at Kensal Green Cemetery. Its use implied a greater preponderance towards Whig sympathies amongst its board of directors, rather than the emerging fashion amongst high church or Tory designers - the Gothic revival style. The latter had been favoured by board members such as Augustus Charles Pugin (1769–1832) and George Carden, and at Kensal Green Cemetery the board's decision to reject a Gothic revivalist approach was a key reason behind George Carden's departure. Soon afterwards, in 1836, the South Metropolitan Cemetery was founded in Norwood, South London; on its board of directors was Sir William Tite, an architect who chose the Gothic style for all the cemetery buildings, and thus Norwood became the first Gothic cemetery to wide public acclaim.

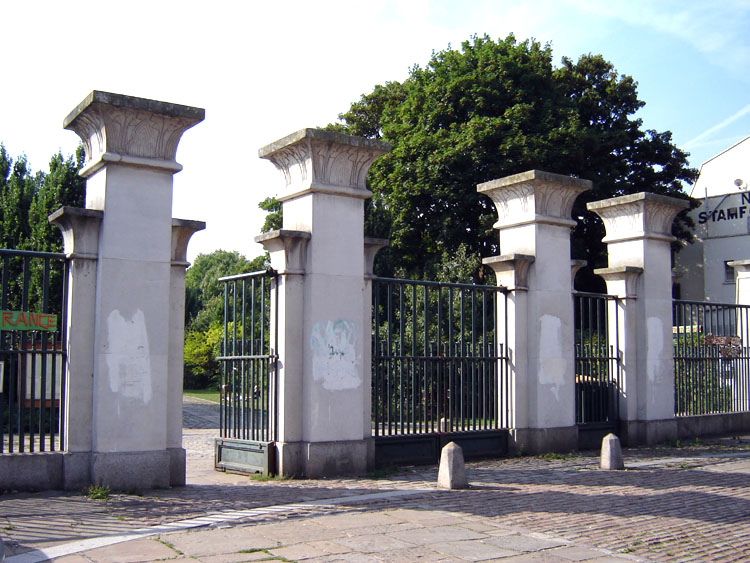
Hosking, Bonomi and Collisons' Egyptian revival gateway to Abney Park Cemetery: the first European use of Egyptianising architecture for Cemetery Design, c. 1840 (photo: September 2005)

In this heady climate, introducing a non-European style of design from Africa was a bold step. Advocates of Gothic revival architecture, notably the polemicist and Gothic architect Augustus W N Pugin (1812–52), proved particularly critical of Abney Park's Cemetery's novel approach which was implicitly sympathetic to a "New World" outlook.

By contrast, Abney Park's approach resonated perfectly with those who had close ties with America, principally Congregationalists and other nonconformist groups whose relatives had left for the New World to pursue political and religious freedom. For them, the proposed Egyptian Revival design symbolised the adoption of an architectural tradition from part of the African continent with an association with Great Pyramids and reflected the pioneering spirit embodied in Massachusetts' Mount Auburn Cemetery.

Though use of the style proved controversial in some quarters, others were impressed with the bold design at Abney Park and began to conclude that the "Egyptian Revival" should be taken further, mostly for purely stylistic reasons. In 1839 it had been used more discreetly at the entrance to the catacombs at Highgate Cemetery, but by 1842, two years after Abney Park opened, it was possible for the architect Thomas Wilson, a member of the General Cemetery Company board, to publish the most futuristic cemetery design ever in the Egyptian style. He envisaged the building of a brick and granite pyramid taller than St. Paul's Cathedral containing nearly a quarter of a million catacombs, on nearly a hundred levels, surmounting Primrose Hill, complete with a public observatory at the top.

== See also ==
- Abney Park
- Abney Park Cemetery
- Abney Park Chapel
