= Acacia lunata =

Lunate-leaved acacia

Scientific classification
- Kingdom: Plantae
- Clade: Tracheophytes
- Clade: Angiosperms
- Clade: Eudicots
- Clade: Rosids
- Order: Fabales
- Family: Fabaceae
- Subfamily: Caesalpinioideae
- Clade: Mimosoid clade
- Genus: Acacia
- Species: A. lunata

Binomial name
- Acacia lunata Lodd., G.Lodd. & W.Lodd.
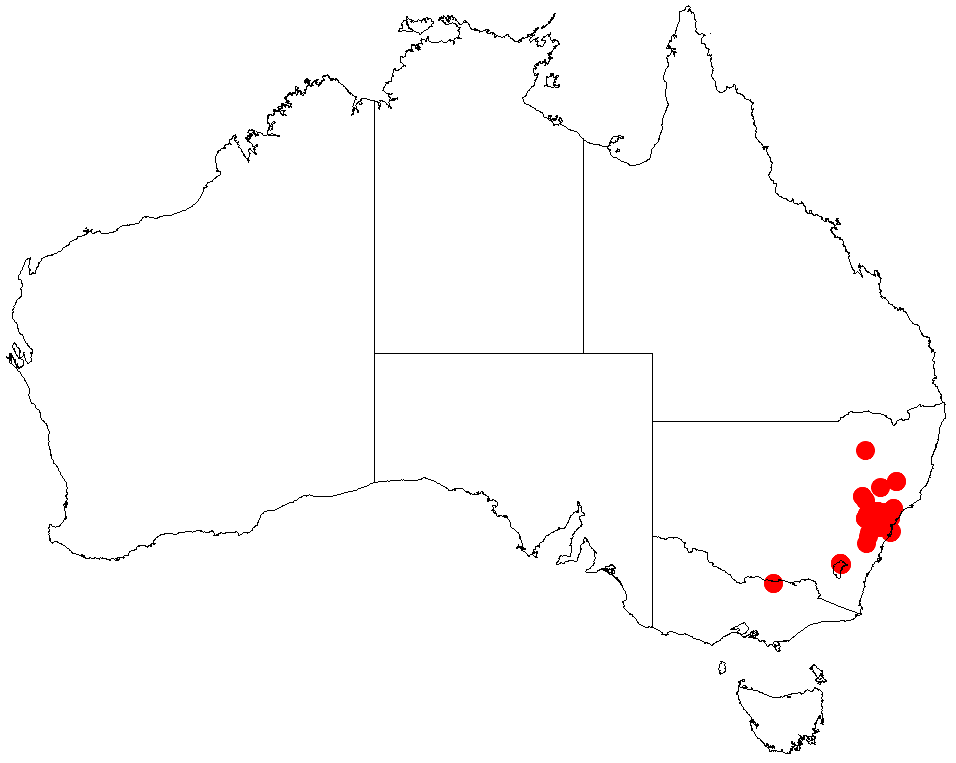
- Occurrence data from AVH

Synonyms
- Acacia falcata var. minor Colla; ? Acacia falcinella Tausch; Acacia lunata Sieber ex DC. nom. illeg.; Acacia lunata Lodd., G.Lodd. & W.Lodd. var. lunata; Racosperma lunatum (G.Lodd.) Pedley

Species of legume

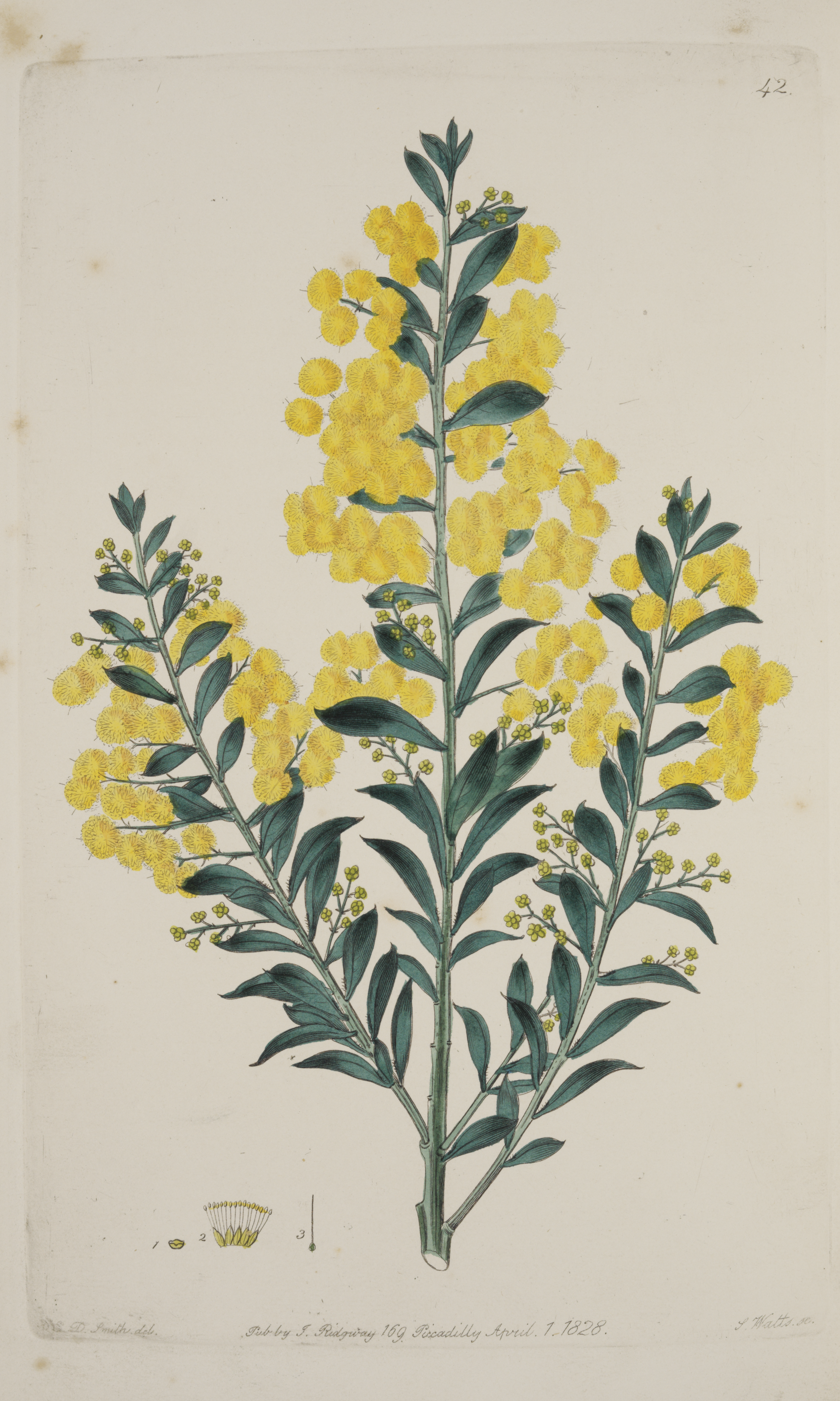
Illustration in Robert Sweet's Flora Australasica.

Acacia lunata, commonly known as lunate-leaved acacia, is a species of flowering plant in the family Fabaceae and is endemic to New South Wales, Australia. It is a shrub with glabrous branchlets, lance-shaped to narrowly elliptic phyllodes, spherical heads of bright golden yellow flowers, and narrowly oblong, firmly papery to thinly leathery pods.

== Description ==
Acacia lunata is a shrub that typically grows to a height of 1–3 m (3 ft 3 in – 9 ft 10 in) and has glabrous branchlets. Its phyllodes are on short stem projections, usually asymmetrically lance-shaped with the narrower end towards the base to narrowly elliptic, mostly 20–30 mm (0.79–1.18 in) long, 4–9 mm (0.16–0.35 in) wide, thin green and more or less glaucous when young. The flowers are borne in two to 23 spherical heads in glabrous racemes 20–40 mm (0.79–1.57 in) long on peduncles 2–4 mm (0.079–0.157 in) long. The heads are 5–6 mm (0.20–0.24 in) in diameter with three to five loosely arranged, bright golden yellow flowers. Flowering occurs from July to November, mainly in August and September, and the pods are firmly papery to thinly leathery, straight to slightly curved, 50–85 mm (2.0–3.3 in) long and 6–8 mm (0.24–0.31 in) wide, mostly straight-sided to slightly constricted between the seeds. The seeds are egg-shaped, about 4 mm (0.16 in) long and dull black with a club-shaped aril.

== Taxonomy ==
Acacia lunata was first formally described in 1819 by the Loddiges family (Joachim Conrad, George and William Loddiges) in The Botanical Cabinet. The specific epithet (lunata) means 'crescent' and refers to the shape of the phyllodes.

== Distribution and habitat ==
Lunate-leaved acacia is found from Putty and Cessnock and south to Riochmond and Dural and at Bralga Tops. It usually grows in forest on sandstone, often on slopes near creeks.

== See also ==
- List of Acacia species
