= John Jay (builder) =

British builder (1805–1872)

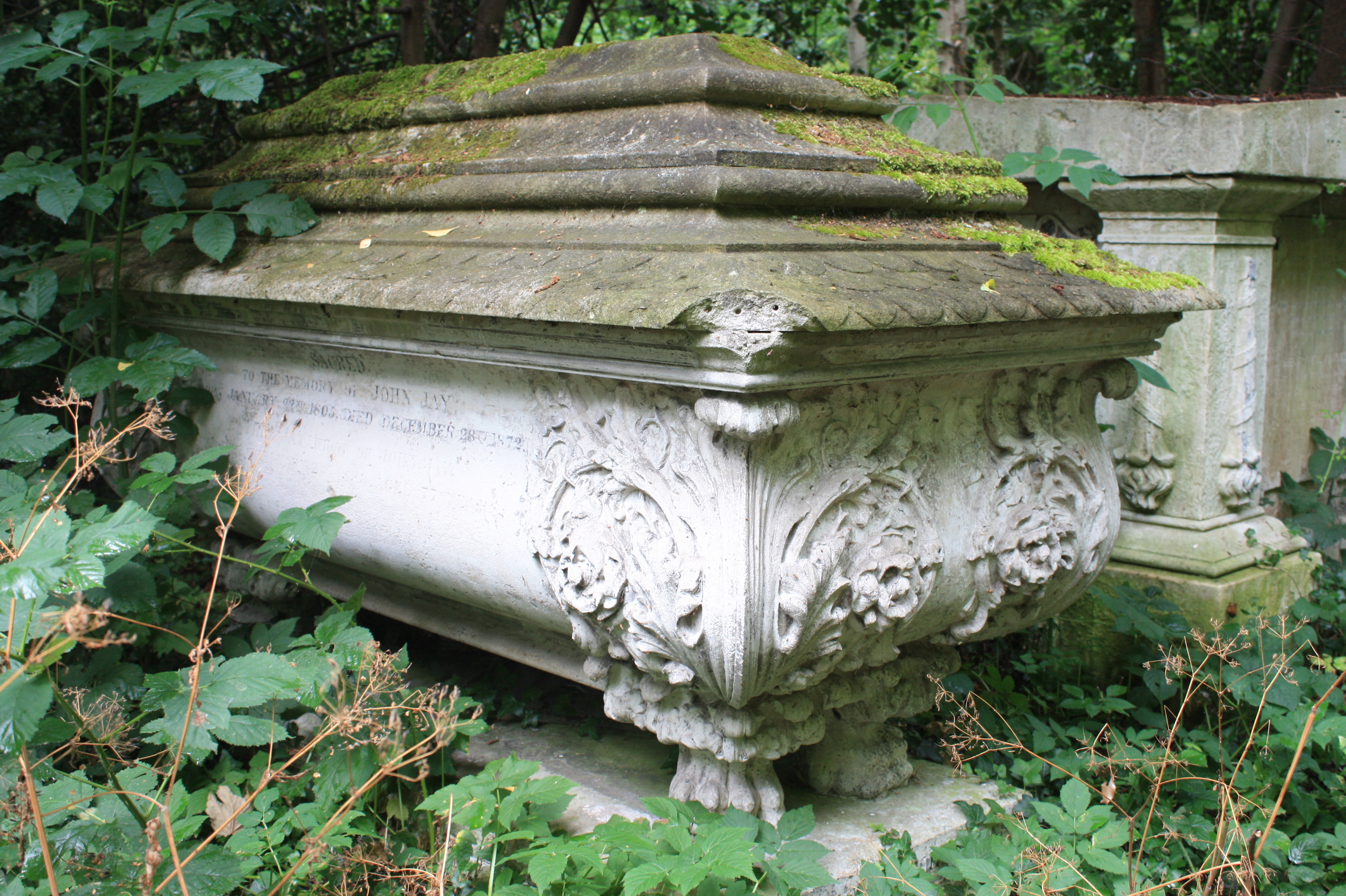
The John Jay sarcophagus, Abney Park Cemetery

John Jay (1805–1872) was a building contractor and, earlier, a skilled stonemason, who owned a construction company located in the central City of London within Metropolitan London, England, during the 19th century and its period of rapid civic and railway expansion in the middle of the 19th century. Jay's varied body of works included building the Victorian clock tower and city clock of the British Houses of Parliament after the Westminster Palace had been damaged by a fire in 1833. Jay was also responsible for constructing many smaller architectural projects, such as the notable Abney Park Chapel and the Trinity Independent Chapel.

== Early life ==
John Jay was born in Norfolk, England, in January 1805. By 1826, he had moved to the village of Bethnal Green near the City of London, where he married Esther Wilson (1806–88) at St. Matthew's Church. By the late 1830s, Jay had his offices and workshops in the heart of the City of London at 65 London Wall. These appear to have been inheritance owned either by Jay alone, or else shared with close relatives, because in 1806, an older Mr. Jay, who was also a builder with an address at London Wall, had already rebuilt the building that was later renamed the "Adelphi Theatre", designed by the architect Samuel Beazley.

== Buildings of note ==
The first building known to have been built by John Jay was the Abney Park Chapel (opened May 1840). This project was soon followed by the Trinity Independent Chapel (opened 1841), both designed by the architect William Hosking, and St. Michael's Church in Stockwell, designed by William Rogers.

During the 1850s, Jay won the contract for the construction of the Victoria Towers and clock, and the Old Palace Yard frontage at the Houses of Parliament; and one for St. Olave's Grammar School. His other civic buildings included Andrew Reed's philanthropic ventures, the Infant Orphan Asylum at Wanstead (opened in 1843) and the so-called "Idiot Asylum at Earlswood" now the Royal Earlswood Hospital.

In the realm of railway building, Jay's contracts included Stoke-on-Trent Railway Station, built to the Elizabethan and Jacobean designs of A.H. Hunt (contract awarded in July 1847); a section of the Great Northern Railway from the King's Cross Station to the entrance of the tunnel beneath Copenhagen Fields, and also the King's Cross goods station and passenger terminus itself (all built around 1850). In 1853, Jay was awarded the contract for building the Metropolitan Railway, which he worked on during the 1860s. Colchester Station (Eastern Counties Railway) was also built by Jay. Furthermore, there was a substantial part of Paddington Station that Jay constructed. The latter building was built by Jay in about 1857 for the Great Western Railway Company, following the design of Isambard Brunel.

Jay also built commercial premises (such as the first Billingsgate Market, and the rebuilding of the Clothworker's Hall in the City of London - both during the 1850s); and estates of domestic houses - for example, three hundred houses at the Packington Estate just north of the City of London were built by John Jay. Also, in 1868, upon acquisition of Campsbourne Lodge along with those parts of its estate not already sold off to the British Feeehold Land Company or other developers, he proceeded to build several of the streets bordering Alexandra Park, some of which remain to this day.

At one point relatively early in his career, his business was expanding so rapidly that he could not finance it (he was compelled to file for bankruptcy on 14 February 1843 at the Court of Bankruptcy in London). Before long his debts were re-arranged and discharged, and the business prospered again, enabling his family to move, in about 1860, to a fashionable detached villa in its own grounds, Highbury Park House, Highbury; and soon afterwards to Ashford House, Priory Road, in nearby Hornsey.

== Memorial to the life of Jay ==
A memorial monument to John Jay, which is (Grade II listed by English Heritage), stands on the west side of Dr. Watts' Walk (the central southern path) in Abney Park Cemetery, Stoke Newington, and is said to have been carved in his own workshop, possibly by his own hand. It is a highly ornamented white marble sarcophagus with moulded cover, lions' feet, and rich acanthus decoration in the corners. Many of his station buildings still exist and are listed by English Heritage.
