= Abney Park Chapel =

Coordinates: 51.5644°N 0.0774°W

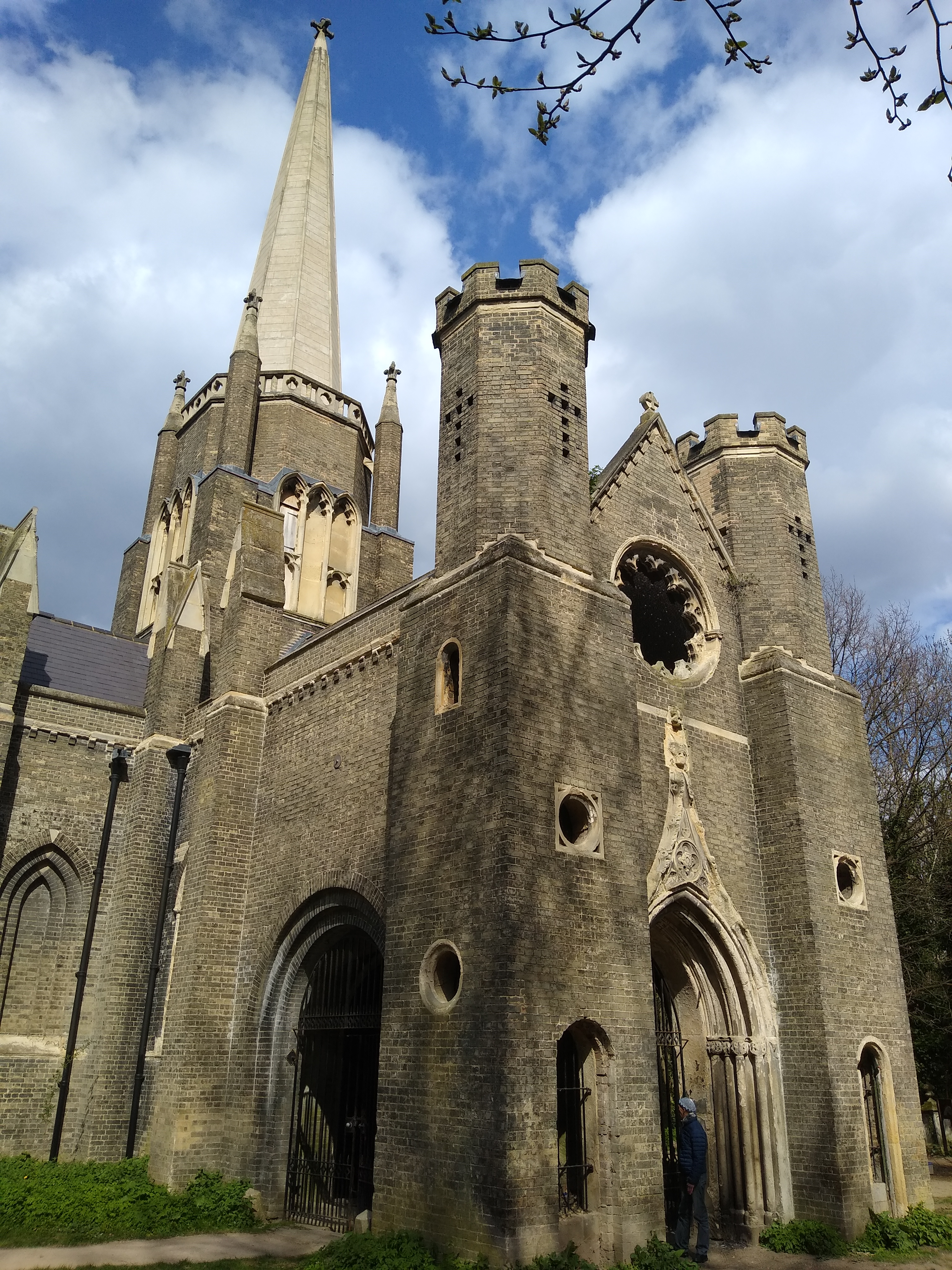
- The dramatically soaring Abney Park Chapel
- Abney Park Chapel
- OS grid reference: TQ 33363 86811
- Country: England
- Denomination: Nondenominational

History
- Status: Chapel
- Founded: 1838–40
- Founder: George Collison

Architecture
- Functional status: Active
- Architect: William Hosking

Abney Park Chapel, is a Grade II Listed chapel, designed by William Hosking and built by John Jay that is situated in Europe's first wholly nondenominational cemetery, Abney Park Cemetery, London.

Opened in May, 1840, it was the first nondenominational cemetery chapel in Europe (and probably the world – since the chapel at Mount Auburn was a later addition). It helped pioneer the early use of the Dissenting Gothic building style, and encouraged renewed interest in the careful blending of earlier styles.

It was primarily the work of a four-person design team. George Collison II, who acted as a client for the cemetery founders, had a passion for Mount Auburn Cemetery near Boston, and, Beverley Minster which dominated the skyline in his ancestral town of Beverley. William Hosking served as architect and civil engineer, and had an interest in Egyptology, antiquities, and architectural writing and scholarship. The builder was John Jay, and George Loddiges was the botanical scientist and horticulturalist. He was primarily concerned with the setting of Abney Park Chapel, including its nearby rosarium and a collection of American plants on the Chapel Lawn.

The chapel's first minister was the Rev. John Jefferson, who officiated for more than a quarter of a century.

== Location and orientation ==
The first matters to establish were the design principles and layout. Since this was to be the first non-denominational chapel for a European garden cemetery, there were no existing guidelines. William Hosking, in discussion with George Collison II developed a plan to site the novel chapel at the very heart of Abney Park foregoing any positioning close to the main entrance. The aim was that, once the pine trees that were planted along the Chapel Ride matured, the chapel would gradually be revealed through a sylvan landscape approach drive. The sinuously designed Chapel Ride was therefore lined with Bhutan Pine trees on its south side. Not only could nature be appreciated, but the main entrance (with its Egyptian revival building style) would not be eclipsed.

Nonetheless, the chapel was not to be 'hidden' away in the centre of the estate, even as the trees lining its approach matured. Collison and Hosking sought a prominent and unapologetic landmark that would be seen from a good distance beyond the cemetery well into the future. To achieve this, whilst only being slowly revealed on its approach from the main entrance, considerable height was required. Hosking considered this to be best suited to a steeple – it would need to be much higher than any other in the vicinity, surpassing that of the local parish church, to produce maximum effect.

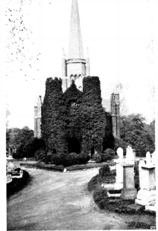
Hosking's Imposing chapel at Abney Park: notable as the first nondenominational Cemetery Chapel in Europe. Unfortunately, ivy obscured the ornate south facade of the Abney Park Chapel by the date of this photograph (Edwardian times) and repairs to the steeple led to a loss of its banding and some other simplification.

== The blending of styles ==
To celebrate its message of religious harmony, the chapel was to be a blend of conventional and unique characteristics. William Hosking drafted and redrafted an increasingly elegant solution to this design problem, beginning from a fairly conventional, scaled-down version of an Anglican Gothic minster as a convenient starting point.

The design of the chapel was to evolve considerably from this starting point. It was a somewhat unusual starting point in some respects in that nonconformists, such as the cemetery directors, generally preferred classical designs over Gothic Revival. It was not until some years later this style was to become popular with nonconformists, whose interest lay purely in its aesthetics. At this date nonconformist clients did not commission the Gothic Revival style, due to pressure to closely associate it with 'high church' uses, as was advocated by some early revivalist architects led by Augustus Welby Pugin. By the time a chapel was built at Mount Auburn in Massachusetts, a few years after Abney Park's Chapel, the Gothic (pointed) style was more commonly accepted by nonconformists.

However, in the early Gothic Revival period of 1838–1840, when the chapel for Abney Park was designed, the use of the Gothic style would certainly have conveyed a 'High church' note in conventional architectural circles. This implies that Collison and Hosking may have used the style as a deliberate architectural counterpoise to what some critics saw as their 'non-western' or 'non-Christian' style of entranceway ('Egyptian Revival'). Those who interpreted the chapel's Gothic affiliations in this contemporary way, might therefore have considered the chapel to contribute 'balance' to the cemetery's entrance ensemble, underpinning the cemetery company's overall philosophy of nondenominational harmony, and reflecting the ecumenical leanings of Isaac Watts who had lived at the parkland estate a century before.

Gradually, in the later Victorian period, adoption of 'Gothic' designs came to suggest an association with nature, rather than with western Christian architecture. Although such associations primarily emerged in the mid-late Victorian 'arts and crafts' period, it is possible that the association with 'nature' and the 'natural world' was an influence on Hosking's design since the overall cemetery project was conceived as a splendid botanical extravaganza, with the largest arboretum in the country, perfected by the famous George Loddiges. Whatever the explanation, Hosking's Abney Park Chapel was designed in a form of Gothic Revival style, which for such an early date is believed to be the earliest example of Gothic Revival architecture for a stand-alone or unconsecrated chapel.

Being earlier than the mainstream use of 'Gothic Revival' designs for chapel architecture, and in all probability with the express intention of weakening the all too frequent association of Gothic with 'High church' buildings, which was being advocated rather pompously by Augustus Pugin, a distinctly 'low Gothic revivalist' style was gradually developed by Hosking and his clients, from a conventional Gothic 'minster-like' starting point. Hosking was successful in producing a unique and careful interpretation of the Gothic style which was well-suited to the 'low church sentiments' of his clients. For example, stock brick rather than traditional stone was used for much of the exterior, introducing a visual quality similar to the Brick Gothic style of Baltic countries, such as Sweden and Estonia. Moreover, neo-classical features (i.e. semi-circular arches) were carefully composited into the horse carriage entrance (porte cochere), and each viewing turret bore a simple Romanesque oculus to let light onto its newel staircase, rather than a pointed or quatrefoil gothic window or an oculus whose aperture was in the Gothic style.

The concept of introducing classical elements into a Gothic design had previously been used in England only on rare occasions, such as for the Little Castle at Bolsover in Derbyshire, built after the Reformation, from 1612. It symbolised a connection with Romanesque-Gothic religious buildings of continental Europe, such as the monastic St. Procopius Basilica in Třebíč, Czech Republic, where Jewish and Christian cultures co-existed.

Hosking's search for a thoughtful and appropriate design for the three rose windows of the chapel, may also have been influenced partly by the St. Procopius Basilica which incorporates a rare example of the use of a naturalistic ten-part rose window. All wild roses have five petals and five sepals or multiples of this number, as do their fruit. Similarly a lime, orange or lemon which belong to the family Rosaceae will also normally show ten fruit segments, as can be seen if cut in half. The adoption of a botanical rose window introduced an element of classical learning and reason rather than the tendency of Gothic towards the more elaborate and supernatural. Its choice would also have suited the horticulturalist and scientist George Loddiges who was on the design team for he saw the 'hand of the Creator' in the beautiful natural designs of botanical species and varieties. His multi-part work, 'The Botanical Cabinet' took a distinctly more religious view of botany than competitor's illustrated works such as Curtis' Botanical Magazine and was noted for its piety. Near to the chapel with its splendid botanical rose windows George Loddiges laid out a special rosarium to bring attention to this rich and diverse plan family. The botanical rose windows would also have suited George Collison for his ancestral town was Beverley in Yorkshire, where he would have been familiar with the widespread use of the White Rose of York as a symbol and have seen it reproduced, taking up the theme of the rose, in the rare ten-part botanical rose windows of Beverley Minster.

Ultimately the botanical rose windows at the Abney Park Chapel provided a strong symbolic detail that dovetailed the chapel to the design of the grounds and its rosarium, besides offering the beauty of simplicity and a compliment to the Creator; a design of considerable thoughtfulness as came to typify William Hosking's learned and historical approach to architecture.

For the pointed Gothic windows, grouped in threes, no tracery was used, also representing careful thinking about simplicity of design. For the steeple, William Hosking drew on the fourteenth century Bloxham church in Oxfordshire for design inspiration. Its steeple, the tallest in that county, is octagonal in cross-section and gains additional elevation from a raised octagonal base with a decorated rim; and the spire itself is of graceful, elegant simplicity unlike more ornate gothic steeples with buttresses and decorative crockets. These low Gothic characteristics suited Hosking's purpose well, though he added a flourish of colour banding to the steeple – a Victorian fashion.

The completed chapel had unornamented yellow stock brick walls, a tall, simple steeple and botanically accurate rose windows. Its low Gothic design reflected its nondenominational function, and the building established Abney Park as a local landmark, visible from Church Street and the High Street and, further away, from Woodberry Downs.

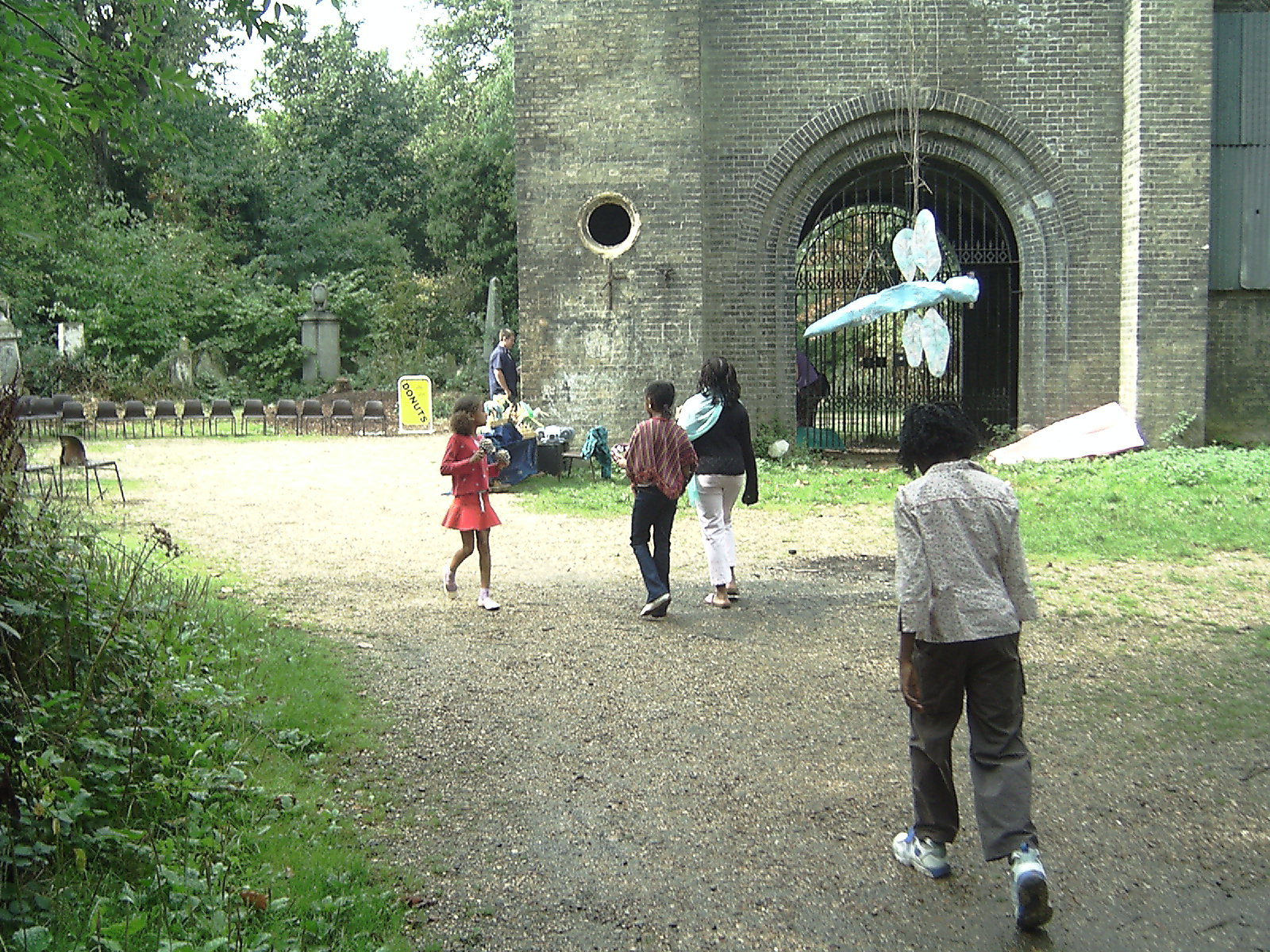
Hosking and Collison's inclusion of a semi-circular classical arch in an otherwise Gothic building helped symbolise the nondenominational concept of the cemetery – that it was open to all.

== The single cell layout ==
Perfecting the chapel had necessitated a long process of iteration and re-design to meet the wishes of the Cemetery Directors for a new nondenominational style. William Hosking mastered the brief admirably, providing them with a chapel building that achieved the company's objective remarkably well, both in its choice of materials and style of design.

However, of equal significance was its layout in plan section; for the chapel comprised just a single internal chamber that would be available to all, regardless of denomination; marking the chapel out in a practical, functional sense, in addition to its external appearance, as the first nondenominational cemetery chapel in Europe. Moreover, its cruciform plan adopted equal arms as in a Greek cross, giving conceptual strength to this concept of equality before God, through its design approach. At a time when cemeteries had to have separate denominational chapels or at best, a double-cell arrangement, Hosking's chapel was entirely unique to European cemetery design.

== The axial vista in memory of Isaac Watts ==
The chapel's eventual design avoided the temptation towards eclectic over-adornment sometimes associated with excesses of romantic mediaevalism, for which the derogatory term Gothick can be used. By satisfying the Cemetery Company Directors' preference for a low Gothic style, William Hosking helped focus visual attention on the chapel's one elaborately designed elevation – the crenellated and decorated south elevation. This facade was set between two octagonal stair turrets, with newel staircases inside, illuminated by simple oculus windows. These led to dramatic viewpoints over Dr Watts' Walk, as well as to an internal viewing platform above an ogee arch with trefoil panels and quatrafoil. The whole effect created an almost theatrical backdrop to the south chapel lawn. As such it almost 'spoke' to the vista to which it was conspicuously aligned – a new axial walk in Dr. Watts' memory being laid out due south. Thus the chapel would be aligned with Dr Watts' and Lady Mary Abney's former place of residence – Abney House, Church Street.

Orienting the chapel this way proved problematic to engravers who took artistic licence to illustrate Abney Park Chapel as if it were aligned perfectly in between the main entrance pillars! However, its purposeful 'turning away' from the commercial entrance to enable its most elegant facade to face a planned vista and walk in memory of Dr Watts, was important to capture the spirit of the park. It symbolised the Abney Park Cemetery Company's deliberate land assembly of the Fleetwood House and Abney House grounds to conserve it for dedication to the life of Dr Watts, and in memory of his benefactor Lady Mary Abney. The cemetery company ensured that its official engraver, George Childs, issued a perspective of Abney Park Chapel ('Dr Watts' Chapel') along the axial vista of what was to be laid out as Dr Watts' Walk. This was distributed free to all shareholders.

Dr Watts was an important figure for the cemetery founders. During his life but more so after his death, he had become associated with the nondenominational concept now being espoused by the cemetery company. Although Dr Watts had been a lifelong religious Independent, he had been honoured in death by a memorial in the Anglican Westminster Abbey, and his hymns and scholarly teachings had become widely favoured by moderates of many denominations. When Edward Hodges Baily RA FRS was commissioned a few years later to design London's only public statue to Dr Isaac Watts, it was situated in Dr Watts' Walk in front of the Abney Park Chapel.

== Support and controversy for the new approach ==
Endorsement of Hosking's place in architectural history along with the guiding hand of his client George Collison, came once the final design was agreed. The foundation stone was laid by Sir Chapman Marshall, Lord Mayor of the City of London in the presence of the Sheriffs of the City and County.

Though the purpose of Hosking's orientation and design received considerable praise, there remained some for whom the completed chapel, not being adherent to strict, or 'high' gothic principles, was deemed to be of 'poor design', whilst for others it was said to be 'pretentious' since it appeared to be the first use of the Gothic Revival architecture style for an unconsecrated chapel in England at a time when the style was being associated with Anglican and Anglo-Catholic ideas. Hosking's critics emanated principally from groups such as the Cambridge 'Ecclesiologists' who were pursuing an Anglican revivalist agenda and favoured particular stylistic approaches and applications. The balanced design worked as planned however, the cemetery attracting Dissenters and Anglicans in roughly equal numbers initially, before it became especially popular with the former. In later years other architects, notably George Gilbert Scott followed Hosking's approach beyond merely copying the past, and began to produce designs in their own personal manner, creating buildings that sometimes mixed elements of the English Gothic style with features of other countries and periods; indeed Scott believed a new genre would develop from such an approach. Nor was it many years before the use of the Gothic style in its various 'high' and 'low' forms became commonplace in the design of unconsecrated chapels.

Even at the time of its completion, counterbalancing the critics were other 'arbiters of taste' who concluded that Hosking's cemetery design worked exceptionally well; notably John Loudon. Loudon had been critical of the catacombs at Kensal Green Cemetery as 'bad taste', and had also found the 'pleasure-ground style' at Norwood cemetery objectionable; yet offered only praise for the new principles of cemetery layout, management and design at Abney Park.

Moreover, upon completion of the Abney Park Chapel, William Hosking was offered the post of professor of Art and Construction at King's College, then an avowedly the Anglican establishment, and John Britton, who had co-authored one of Pugin's books promoting gothic revival architecture, was soon to work in partnership with William Hosking to devise a restoration scheme in Bristol for an Anglican church. Thus Hosking could claim to have spanned the inter-denominational divide.

== The landscape setting ==
The design team included not only the architect William Hosking, but also the botanist and nurseryman George Loddiges. Moreover, the ethos of Abney Park Cemetery was distinctly botanical. The plans for the chapel therefore featured a nearby rosarium and a collection of American plants on the Chapel Lawn.

== The chapel today ==
Today, Hosking's novel chapel continues to receive acclaim as an architectural set piece amongst the Magnificent Seven London garden cemeteries of the time.

However, a fire gutted the interior and it has been closed for thirty years. The roof slates and roof flashings of the chapel have been damaged by unauthorised climbing and theft at times when the park was left unsupervised and unlocked overnight, and this has resulted in water seepage into the chapel walls which is now causing serious problems to the whole building. The chapel remains a 'building at risk' despite re-roofing and other structural repairs. Plans are being progressed by The Abney Park Cemetery Trust to re-open it and give access to the public and community groups once again along with an improved nature and landscape setting.

In 2024, the chapel received new stained glass windows and seating as part of a £5 restoration programme, using funding from the National Lottery Heritage Fund, The National Lottery Community Fund, Hackney Council, and the charity Abney Park Trust.
