= Dissenting Gothic =

Architectural style associated with English Dissenters

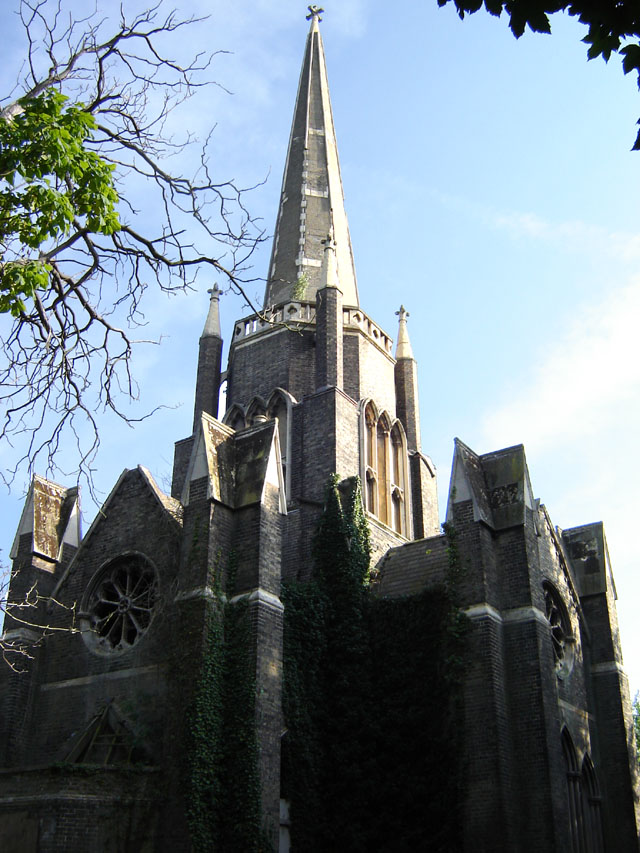
Abney Park Chapel (1840), an example of Dissenting Gothic architecture

Dissenting Gothic is an architectural style associated with English Dissenters – Protestants not affiliated with the Church of England. It is a distinctive style in its own right within Gothic Revival architecture that emerged primarily in Britain, its colonies and North America, during the 19th century.

== Definition ==
In contrast to the pure copying of English Gothic advocated for and promoted by some influential ecclesiologists during the early Gothic Revival period in Britain (most particularly by Augustus Welby Pugin and to an extent in the pages of the Camden Society's quarterly journal The Ecclesiologist (1841–68)), Dissenting Gothic provided a less Anglo-centric interpretation of the Gothic style, and purposely introduced modernising elements to meet clients' needs. This primarily involved the interests of good design overriding historical purity to the Gothic style, with the role of the architect seen as originating a design solution, rather than promoting specific Gothic forms as a cause célèbre in pursuit of an idealised high church and medieval belief system.

Departing from the narrow confines of the approach adopted by some of the leading British ecclesiologists during the early Gothic Revival period, architects who were willing to respond to the demand for Dissenting Gothic enlarged their portfolio, drawing on mainland European Gothic architecture as well as English forms. Moreover, they could be more creative about relationship between form and function, seeking novel but appropriate ways to introduce elements not found in mediaeval Gothic churches, so as to create interiors that met the particular congregational needs of the independent or nonconformist chapel-builders of the 19th century; accommodate Sunday Schools and meeting rooms, with sometimes distorting effects on the physiognomy of the building; use confined city plots in efficient ways by varying from strict Gothic floorplans and orientations; and experiment with a wide range of materials, and polychromatic designs, not found in medieval buildings.

== Early Gothic Revival period ==
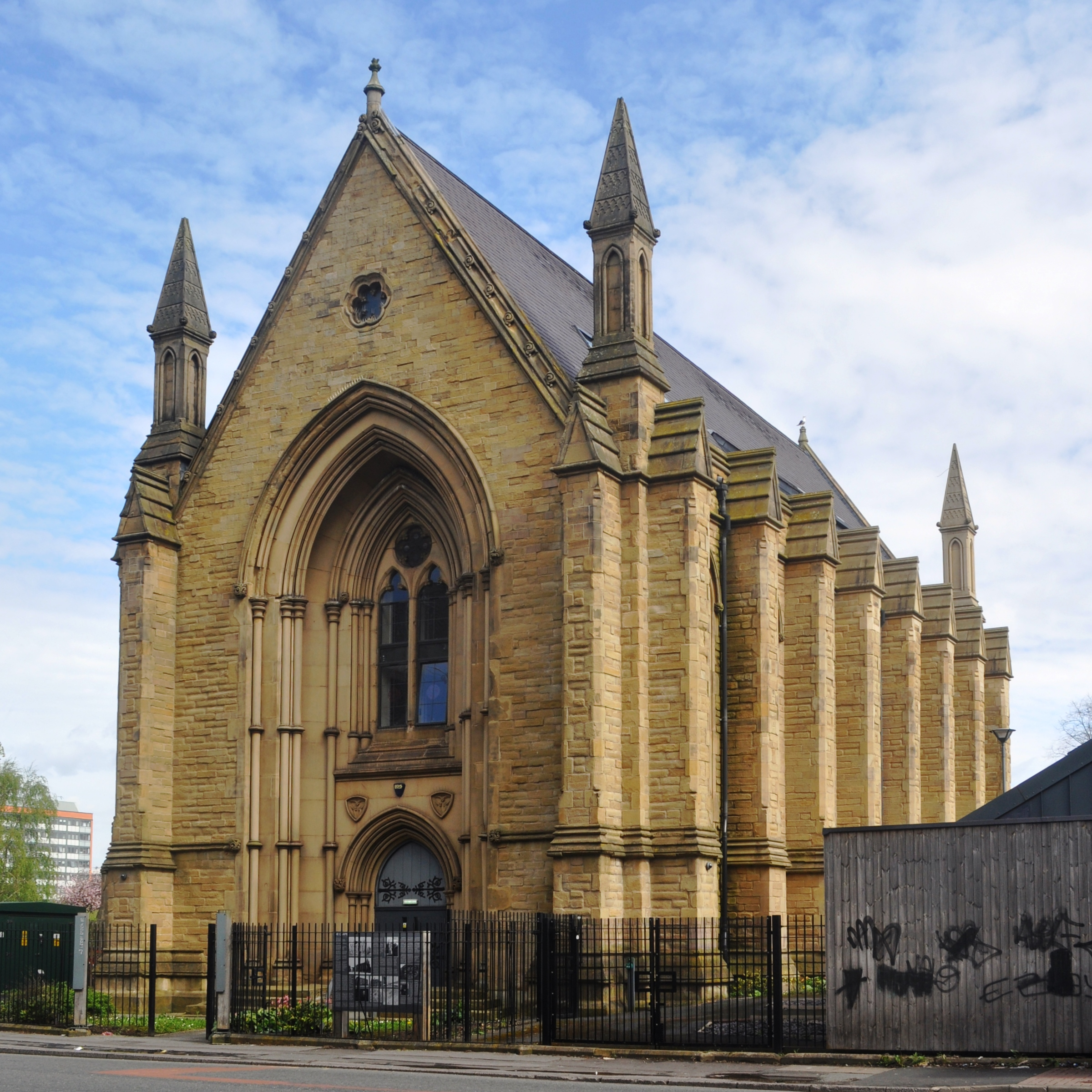
The former Upper Brook Street Chapel, Manchester (1837–39)

Although the earliest examples of Dissenting Gothic were commissioned by trustees of independent churches and chapels at about the same time as the beginnings of the purist Anglo-Catholic-dominated Gothic Revival movement, namely during the second quarter of the 19th century, the latter so profoundly dominated and led this early period of 'Gothic Revival' that there were relatively few examples in Britain or elsewhere of Dissenting Gothic before the third quarter of the century.

This limited use of Dissenting Gothic in the early Gothic Revival period of the second quarter of the century reflected a marked reluctance by trustees and sponsors of independently funded and managed churches or chapels (commonly referred to as 'nonconformist' churches or chapels in Britain) to commission neo-Gothic architecture, whilst the ecclesiologists portrayed it as 'high church' architecture. Equally, there was a refusal by some 'Gothic Revival' architects to accept commissions for 'low church' buildings, including nonconformist chapels. For philosophical reasons, some architects in the early 'Gothic Revival' period considered that the style should remain the exclusive preserve of the 'high church'.

== Later Gothic Revival period ==
By the mid-19th century, early controversies over use of the style had weakened. In England, the case for commissioning neo-Gothic designs for nonconformist chapels was persuasively argued by the trained architect and Wesleyan Methodist minister Frederick James Jobson (commonly styled F. J. Jobson), in his book Chapel and School Architecture (1850); and in America by the Rev. George Bowler's publication, setting out examples of elevations and floor plans for nonconformist churches in the Gothic revival style.

By the mid-19th century, it was increasingly becoming fashionable to adopt neo-Gothic for artistic reasons and intrinsic appeal alone, superseding its early associations with 'high church' buildings and their clients. For more prosaic reasons, Dissenting Gothic began to become commonplace from the mid-19th century onwards; by that date, the trustees of independent chapels could more easily afford the high building costs associated with the neo-Gothic style. For example, in Britain, the 1851 census recorded, for the first time, a greater number of people attending independent chapels than Anglican churches; the higher level of philanthropic donations and membership fees this provided, could now become reflected in more costly building designs.

By the time the Gothic Revival had matured into a commonly accepted building style for all manner of building types (referred to as the "High Victorian Gothic" period (1855–85) in Britain), the influence of the ecclesiologists - with their vision of neo-Gothic as befitting only high church buildings, and favouring only pure 'English Gothic' forms with historically-correct mediaeval detail - had passed by. This later 'Gothic Revival' period saw a willingness to innovate by many influential architects, reflecting the success of the less narrow approach of Dissenting Gothic. The architect James Cubitt embodied such forward-looking principles in his book Church Design for Congregations (1870), in which he noted the unsuitability of the conventional Gothic plan for nonconformist chapels, adding "there is every reason why our churches should be fitted for their destined use. It is not enough that they can be used..." His book gave further encouragement to looking at models besides traditional 'English Gothic', referring for example, to designs from Santa Sophia, Torcello, Gerona and Cologne.

Amongst these, northern European Brick Gothic was perhaps the best known alternative to English styles at that time; partly on account of its lower cost than stone blocks, but also its appeal to a section of nonconformist thought to whom highly extravagant and ornamented building styles and monuments were either too vulgar, or associated with mediaeval superstition - Spurgeon cautioned against the Gothic fashion leading to "hobgoblins and monsters on the outside of their preaching houses".

In Australia, Dissenting Gothic became known as "Victorian Free Gothic" and whilst the established Protestant Church followed its English counterpart in favouring "Academic Gothic", the independent or nonconformist denominations often chose Victorian Free Gothic. Victorian Free Gothic styles more freely experimented with picturesque silhouettes and polychromatic surfaces, taking more from Ruskin's interest in 'impure' Gothic styles and the artistic merits of Gothic, than from Pugin's 'high church' and medievalist approach.

As the 19th century wore on, Dissenting Gothic became widespread not only as old chapels were rebuilt, but also amongst the new city suburbs that were being established in England and elsewhere. For example, as Clarkel (2001) notes: "'Dissenting Gothic' was the style in Bowden, 'Manchester's most relaxed suburb'". Nonetheless, its appeal amongst independents or nonconformists was not universal. The Baptists, quite unlike the Wesleyan Methodists and most notably the Unitarians, did not come to a generally accepted accommodation of the neo-Gothic style, and indeed Spurgeon advanced the idea that the Grecian style was most appropriate for church buildings because the New Testament was written in Greek. Spurgeon's London Metropolitan Tabernacle of 1861 dramatically illustrated this alternative view.

== Buildings of note ==
Fine examples of Dissenting Gothic include:

- The Union Chapel, on Upper Street, Islington, London - by James Cubitt (1877-9)
- The Abney Park Chapel, Stoke Newington, London - by William Hosking FSA and his client George Collison (1838–40)
- St. Paul's Presbyterian Church, St. James' Street, London - by William Thomas (1854)
- The Unitarian Chapel/Welsh Baptist Chapel/Islamic Academy, Upper Brook Street, Manchester - by Charles Barry (1837–39)
- Mill Hill Chapel, Leeds - by Bowman & Crowther (1847–48)
- The Unitarian Chapel, Gee Cross, Hyde, Cheshire - by Bowman & Crowther (1846–48) - a commission refused by Pugin
- Cavendish Street Congregational Church, Chorlton-on-Medlock, Manchester - by Edward Walters (1847–48) (demolished)
- Friar Lane Congregational Chapel, Nottingham (1828)
- St. Matthew's United Church, Halifax, Nova Scotia (1857)

== Bibliography ==
- Rosman, Doreen (2003) The Evolution of the English Churches, 1500-2000, Cambridge: Cambridge University Press ISBN 0521642051
- Bebbington, David (1989) Evangelicalism in Modern Britain: a history from the 1730s to the 1980s, London: Unwin Hyman ISBN 0049410180
- Bowler, Rev. George (1856) Chapel and Church Architecture with Designs for Parsonages, Boston: Jewett & Company. Cleveland, Ohio: Jewett, Proctor & Worthington. New York: Sheldon, Blakeman & Company
- Powell, Ken (1980) The Fall of Zion: Northern chapel architecture and its future, London: SAVE Britain's Heritage ISBN 0905978064
- Daunton, Martin, ed. (2000) The Cambridge Urban History of Britain; vol. 3: 1840-1950, Cambridge: Cambridge University Press ISBN 0521417074
- Homan, Roger (2006) The Art of the Sublime: principles of Christian art and architecture, Aldershot: Ashgate ISBN 0754650731
