= John Day (botanist) =

English orchid-grower and collector and botanist

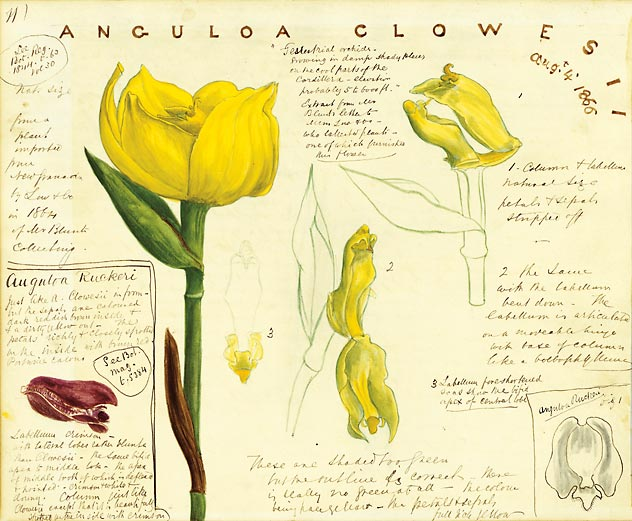
Anguloa clowesii Lindley 1844

John Day (1824–1888) was an English orchid-grower and collector, and is noted for producing some 4000 illustrations of orchid species in 53 scrapbooks over a period of 15 years. These scrapbooks were donated to The Royal Botanic Gardens, Kew in 1902 by his sister, Emma Wolstenholme.The standard author abbreviation J.Day is used to indicate this person as the author when citing a botanical name.

Day was born in the City of London in 1824, the son of a wealthy wine merchant. He bought his first collection of orchids in 1852 at an auction of the stock of Loddiges nursery upon its closure. At an average price of £1 each, he acquired 50 tropical orchids, not the more common Cymbidiums, but Dendrobiums from India, Odontoglossums from tropical America, Lycastes, and Cattleyas, which he grew under ideal conditions in an orchid house built with an exemplary heating system, in the grounds of his home at High Cross, Tottenham. Between 1863 and 1888 at the height of orchid mania in Victorian England, John Day painted and sketched orchids from his own collection in Tottenham, London nurseries, and the Royal Botanic Gardens, Kew, and visited the tropics to see orchid habitat at first hand. A large number of his illustrations depict plants he had coaxed into flower and are the first-known images of species. He maintained close links with Heinrich Gustav Reichenbach, the orchid taxonomist at the University of Hamburg.

In 2004 Thames and Hudson published a collection of John Day's artwork in A Very Victorian Passion: The Orchid Paintings of John Day by Phillip Cribb and Michael Tibbs, two leading authorities on Orchidaceae, who provide a detailed review of the history, background, and botany of the orchids depicted.
