= William Hosking =

British architect

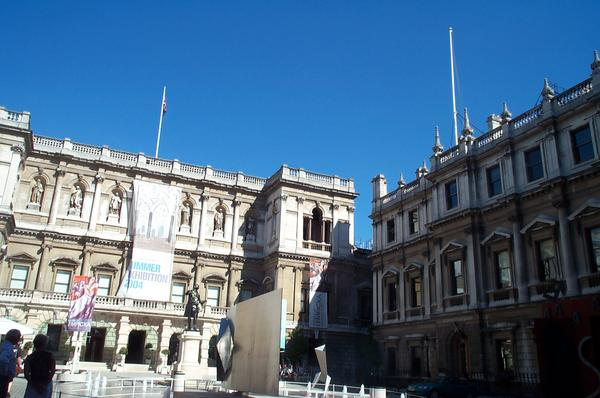
The Royal Academy where Hosking exhibited in the 1820s

William Hosking FSA FRIBA (26 November 1800 – 2 August 1861) was an English writer, lecturer, and architect who had an important influence on the growth and development of London in Victorian times. He became the first Professor of Architecture at King's College London, and associated this discipline in a scholarly fashion with interests in town planning, civil engineering, history and antiquities.

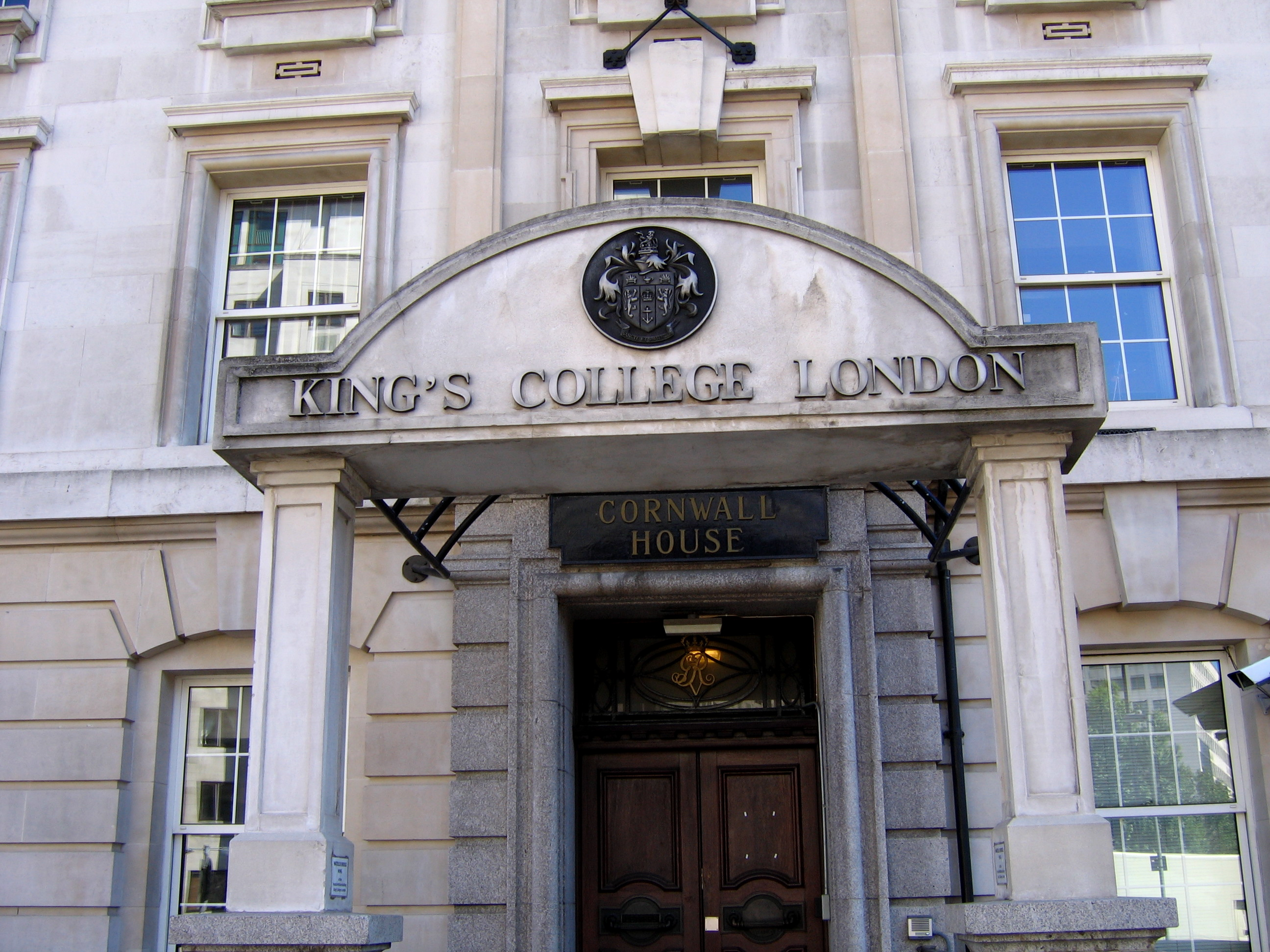
King's College, where Hosking was appointed Professor of Architecture

== Early life ==
=== Upbringing and early writings ===
An illustration of a small Egyptian temple, from Hosking's chapter on "Architecture" in the Encyclopædia Britannica (offprint pub. 1832). Hosking was later chosen by the founders of Abney Park Cemetery to design a pair of similar temple lodges for its front entrance.

Hosking was born at Buckfastleigh in Devon, the son of a woolen manufacturer. In 1809 he emigrated with his parents to New South Wales (which joined the federation of Australia in 1901), where his father, whose business interests in Devon had been doing poorly, had accepted a government office. It was here that Hosking's architectural career began for he was apprenticed to a surveyor and builder. This profession continued to interest him when, in 1819, he returned to England to seek further training, becoming articled to a Wesleyan minister-turned-architect, the Rev. William Jenkins.

In the early 1820s Hosking completed his articles and travelled in southern Europe, including Italy; primarily to study art and architecture with Jenkins's son John. This subsequently led to his exhibiting drawings at the Royal Academy (including "Temple of Concord, Agrigentum" and "Temple of Neptune at Paestum") and provided original material for his first book: A Selection of Architectural and Other Ornaments, Greek, Roman and Italian drawn from the originals in various museums and buildings in Italy, published in 1827. Such scholarship led to his being elected a Fellow of the Society of Antiquaries in 1830. At about this date he was also commissioned by the Encyclopædia Britannica, to contribute the chapters headed "Architecture" and "Building", later to be supplemented with "The Drainage of Towns".

His interest in antiquities—in particular scholarly observation of the architectural details of historic buildings—became reinforced by his membership of the forerunner of the Royal Historical Society, the Camden Society. Indeed, historical accuracy came to characterise Hosking's approach to architecture, as he sought to mix historical elements in appropriate ways. This eye for historical detail was combined with a concern for equally detailed practical improvements in construction techniques (such as fire retardation, damp proofing, and other aspects of what has become known today as a branch of civil engineering known as building control).

== Early architectural work, 1830–1840 ==
=== Bridge design ===
By the early 1830s Hosking had a sufficient reputation in the arts and sciences of buildings and construction to secure an appointment with the new Birmingham, Bristol and Thames Junction Railway Company (The West London Railway) to design an impressive scheme for carrying a roadway over the Paddington Arm of the Grand Junction Canal (now the Grand Union Canal); both of which then passed over the new railway. His success in designing this construction was much commented upon and assisted his election, in 1835, to Fellowship of the Institute of British Architects (now the Royal Institute of British Architects, RIBA).

Thereafter, Hosking continued to develop his interest in bridge design, though more academically, and went on to develop related interests in the construction of buildings for fire resistance, avoidance of damp, etc., which led to his being recognised as having competence in both civil engineering and architectural spheres.

=== Congregationalists' non-denominational cemetery ===
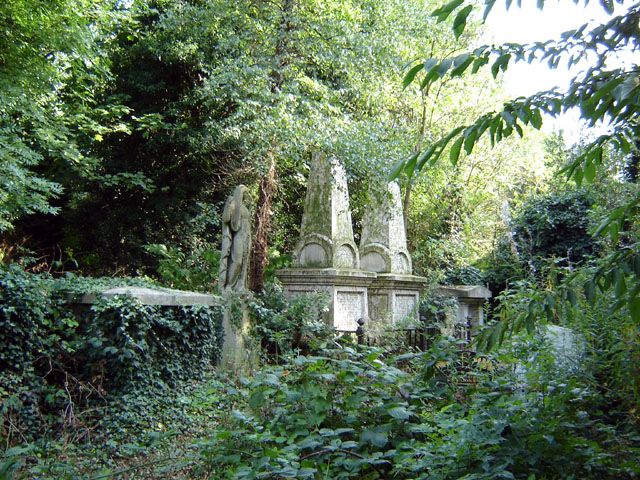
Abney Park Cemetery; every turn of the path reveals a new and unique landscape. (September 2005)

Children's drama, summer 2005, with part of Hosking's Egyptian Entranceway at Abney Park in the background; today it is a visitor centre for the park.

In 1839 Hosking was chosen by the newly formed Abney Park Cemetery Company to design the buildings and contribute to the layout of a landscaped park cemetery to serve the metropolis of London in which all parts would be open to the burial of anyone regardless of belief or denomination. The aim of the promoters of Abney Park Cemetery was to open the first wholly non-denominational garden cemetery in Europe.

Hosking's brief was to design the cemetery's buildings to reflect this new liberal departure in burial reform, and to complement the cemetery's historic parkland setting, into which a magnificent arboretum and educational institute were also to be established.

To complement Hosking's buildings, an appropriate landscape setting was designed and planted by George Loddiges. A landscape vaguely akin to rather simplified version of John Loudon's "gardenesque" style emerged around the perimeter, with the larger part of the estate remaining naturalistic and partially sylvan, possibly echoing the Rural Cemetery ideal emerging in America insofar as this was practicable in a country where landscape was no longer relatively unaffected by human activity.

The uniquely attractive result was much favoured by Loudon, both as an exception to his preferred formal style of cemetery design, and to the "pleasure ground" style he disliked in other contemporary cemeteries such as at Norwood. Loudon was especially complementary towards Abney Park Cemetery since it offered an educational park, complete with an arboretum that was generally open to free public access, something that he had campaigned for in the vicinity of London.

Hosking's clients, led by the Abney Park Cemetery's founder and indefatigable company secretary George Collison II, worked with him to prepare a unique design for the Stoke Newington cemetery. Collison increasingly came to the view that Hosking's layout and architectural styles should meet a brief of being symbolic of the cemetery's founding ideals; to reflect the fact that here was to be the first nineteenth-century garden cemetery to be neither consecrated, nor set out by Act of Parliament, giving it both a non-denominational character and also permitting inclusion of spaces and designs for wider educational and public access purposes. Hosking's buildings must also respect the landscape, for here, unlike other cemeteries of its period, use of the land for interment was partly viewed as a convenient means to achieve other common purposes; all of the original founders were Congregationalists who shared an underlying motivation to preserve and encourage interest and appreciation in the landscape of Abney Park that "spoke to them" of the memory of Isaac Watts and Lady Mary Abney. The promoters hoped that the burial fees would provide the revenue to meet this romantic objective.

Although The Rosary cemetery in Norwich had begun to pioneer elements of a non-denominational approach, it had presented only a partial model (it made no progress on designing a non-denominational chapel until the late nineteenth century). Similarly, other cemeteries to date had only been able to apply the term non-denominational in a partial sense, lacking non-denominational entrance lodges or chapels. Consequently, at the date of Hosking's brief, there was no European architectural style for the buildings of a wholly non-denominational cemetery on which he could draw for inspiration. Thus Hosking's brief was both novel and ambitious. There was no similar model to base his designs on, other than what was in a partially state of progress in the New World, at Mount Auburn Cemetery near Boston.

=== Egyptian Revival temple lodges and early Gothic Revival chapel ===
To realise the visionary Abney Park project, Hosking was commissioned to design an Egyptian Revival entrance ensemble comprising carefully studied temple lodges (with twin north and south components) with dramatic pylons, gates and railings in between. This was to become the earliest example in European architecture of a cemetery building (as opposed to monuments or gates) being designed and built in "Egyptian revival" style. It was also the earliest example in Europe of a cemetery frontage constructed in the style—railings at a cemetery frontage. Previously the style had only been used in cemetery design for memorial monuments, for one temporary frontage scheme (at Mount Auburn Cemetery), and for a gate in a wall of a small non-conformist cemetery in Sheffield).

Though use of the style was disapproved of by Augustus Pugin Jnr (1812–52) for departing from western Christian styles, and proved controversial in like-minded quarters, others were impressed with the bold and quite new design at Abney Park and began to conclude that the "Egyptian Revival" should be taken further; though mostly for purely stylistic reasons. In 1839 it had also been used by Stephen Geary at the entrance to Egyptian Avenue at Highgate Cemetery and by 1842, two years after Abney Park opened, it was possible for the architect Thomas Wilson, a member of the General Cemetery Company board, to publish the most futuristic cemetery design ever, to be wholly completed in the Egyptian style. His proposal was the Metropolitan Sepulchre, a brick and granite pyramid taller than St. Paul's Cathedral containing nearly a quarter of a million catacombs, on nearly a hundred levels, surmounting Primrose Hill, complete with a public observatory at the top! However it did not gain the support it needed, and Hosking's Abney Park entrance and Geary's Egyptian Avenue remain the only successful examples of large-scale use of the Egyptian style in cemetery design.

Hosking's skills did not just shine through in his careful planning and detailing of Egyptian-revival temple lodges and frontage; he was also commissioned to design a similarly unique and impressive cemetery chapel. This, the Abney Park Chapel was to be the first non-denominational cemetery chapel in Europe, and quite probably the world (since its "sister" chapel at Mount Auburn was a later addition). While not detracting from the magnificence and originality of the grand entrance design, Hosking's chapel had, likewise, to make its mark as a unique design. As with the novel entrance, Hosking met the challenge both with originality and a surprisingly wide knowledge of architecture. Since he had travelled extensively, and had a strong interest in antiquities, he was able to look well beyond traditional British architectural and Gothic Revival sources. Further information about his design can be found in the entry for Abney Park Chapel, which is an early example of Dissenting Gothic.

== Academic recognition and town-planning, 1840–1850 ==
=== Professorship at King's College ===
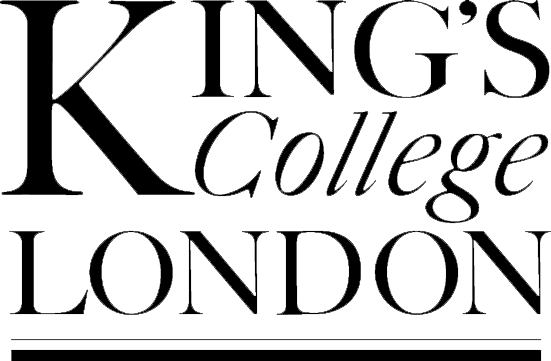
King's College London
Motto	Sancte et sapienter "With holiness and with wisdom"
Established	1829
Homepage	http://www.kcl.ac.uk

Hosking's work at Abney Park won important admirers, as well as critics. Its combination of an architectural design approach, academically researched in every detail, conceptual empathy for the non-denominational idea, and educational landscape complete with arboretum, presented the environs of London with a challenging standard for future landscape and building design. In 1840, in recognition of Hosking's contribution to the advancement of architectural practice, he was offered the first Professorship of King's College in the "Art of Construction", soon renamed "Principles and Practice of Architecture", to better reflect this relatively new profession and its emergence as an academic discipline. Hosking's educational approach was set out in his new book of the same title, Principles and Practice of Architecture (1842). His appointment by King's College was something of a coup for those with liberal, non-denominational empathies, since the university was founded as a high church riposte against the "ungodly" UCL with its non-denominational entry requirements. King's was only brought slowly out of this backward-looking denominational approach that gradually came to be perceived as belonging to a bygone age.

=== Institute of British Architects ===
Hosking served on the Council of the Institute of British Architects 1842-3 while contributing to the standard work of the period: The Theory, Practice and Architecture of Bridges of Stone, Iron, Timber, and Wire; with examples on the principle of suspension, 1843. In its day, this multi-volume work was the most comprehensive book of bridge construction. Many of the bridges depicted no longer exist, such as the long, covered bridge over the Patapsco River in Maryland. Others do, including some of the London bridges. Today the book is a major and unique source of information. More than fifty of the steel engraving plates are fold-out, a number of them quite large, some unfolding to more than two feet in length.

=== Church and chapel design ===
At about the same time as contributing to the epic bridge book, Hosking and medievalist antiquarian John Britton were commissioned by the Vestry of Bristol to report on the fabric of a much-admired thirteenth-century church, St. Mary Redcliffe. The studies were preparatory to an appeal for restoration of the church. Hosking's contribution is recorded in the Vestry's appeal publication, Restoration of the Church of Saint Mary, Redcliffe, Bristol: an appeal by the vicar, churchwardens, and vestry; with an abstract of reports by Messrs. Britton and Hosking and engraved plan and views of the church, by the Rev. M. R.Whish et al., 1842.

In the early 1840s Hosking also designed the Trinity Independent Chapel east of London at Poplar (1840-1). It dominated the streetscene with its prominent classical frontage, a combination of Grecian and Italian Renaissance styles. Unfortunately this building (also known as Trinity Chapel, Trinity Congregational Church, and Green's Chapel after its philanthropic benefactor, the shipyard owner George Green) at the corner of East India Dock Road and Augusta Street, is no longer standing. It was destroyed in the bombing of the East End in 1944. Its replacement, in a very modern style (the New Trinity Congregational Church) formed part of the "Exhibition of Live Architecture" for the Festival of Britain, 1951, at the Lansbury Estate development. Fortunately the original church bell could be incorporated into the new church, having been recast and repaired following its salvage from the bombsite.

=== Early modern town planning ===
Title page of Hosking's 1848 book Regulation of Buildings in Towns

In 1844 Hosking was appointed to oversee the application of new building standards embodied in the Metropolitan Building Act. In support of this role as "Official Referee of Metropolitan Buildings", Hosking published his own manual in 1848 (A Guide to the Proper Regulation of Buildings in Towns as a means of promoting and securing the Health, Comfort and Safety of the Inhabitants), reprinted in 1849 under the more succinct title Healthy Homes.

Such work led to a series of appointments on parliamentary inquiries, investigating the state of town planning across England, by taking evidence from local witnesses in the company of an appointed barrister. This work resulted in parliamentary papers, or "Blue Books". The term "parliamentary paper" generally denotes documentation papers for tabling in the House of Commons or, less frequently, the House of Lords, or both. "Blue Books" in the 19th and 20th centuries commonly sported a blue paper cover. Typical examples of Hosking's "blue book" inquiries include:

Sunderland markets, bridge, ferries, etc.

"Sunderland Improvements, Markets and Bridge. Report of the Commissioners of Her Majesty's Woods, Forests, Land Revenues, Works and Buildings, enclosing the Report of the Surveying Officers appointed to make Preliminary Inquiries, 1847; evidence for enlarging the Markets and providing new Markets, and for the Regulation of the Markets and Fairs within the Borough of Sunderland, and for the general Improvement of the said Borough; and For Paving, Lighting, Sewering, supplying with Water and improving the Borough of Sunderland, and for vesting the Management thereof and of the Markets and Bridge in the Mayor, Aldermen and Burgesses ..."

York Lendal Bridge and Approaches

"Report of the Commissioners of Her Majesty's Woods, Forests, Land Revenues, Works and Buildings, enclosing the Report of the Surveying Officers appointed to make Preliminary Inquiries, 1847; evidence relating to a proposed 'Act for building a Bridge across the River Ouse, in the City of York .. and for widening, altering and improving certain Streets or Thoroughfares within the said City, and for other Purposes'".

Cockermouth Improvement

"Report of the Commissioners of Her Majesty's Woods, Forests, Land Revenues, Works and Buildings, enclosing the Report of the Surveying Officers appointed to make Preliminary Inquiries, 1847 - evidence relating to a 'Bill for Paving, Lighting, Cleansing, Watching and otherwise Improving the Town of Cockermouth, in the County of Cumberland, and for the Removal and Prevention of Nuisances and Annoyances within the same'".

On 26 January 1847 Hosking's father-in-law, the eminent printer William Clowes died. He is buried at West Norwood Cemetery.

== Architectural designs of the 1850s ==
=== British Museum ===
During the 1830s and 1840s the British Museum had been extensively re-built to designs approved by trustees and built by the architect, Sir Robert Smirke. However, as work progressed it became evident that public interest in the museum's collections and library could not be adequately accommodated within the designs that had been approved. A Royal Commission was appointed in 1848 to look into the whole question, and various schemes to convert the open inner courtyard into exhibition space were submitted during 1849, including one by Hosking for a circular gallery modeled on the Pantheon in Rome.

Hosking's entry received professional acclaim for the concept and quality of the design; his proposal becoming illustrated in The Builder magazine during the following year. It was therefore a great surprise when he learnt that the museum was indeed commissioning a building for the quadrangle - with the dome, circular plan and other features that had distinguished his proposal - but did not envisage crediting him for the competition idea.

Only one architectural design drawn up by the Professor during the 1850s had led to a building being constructed. This was for an office for Messrs. Berens on the south side of Canon Street. Somewhat piqued, Hosking set out his concerns in a book: Some observations upon the recent addition of the Reading-room to the British Museum; with plans, sections and other illustrative documents (London: Stanford, 1858) that aimed to put the record straight from his perspective. In great detail it explained why this was an obvious case of plagiarism, and why, although some modification was needed since the competition as the dome was now to be for a reading room rather than a gallery, the result was poorer than it need be: "How mean their dumpy dome-room is" Hosking opined.

The museum did not agree that Hosking's original competition design had been a significant influence on their eventual approach. The credit for the original idea was claimed by its librarian Panizzi, who though unqualified as an architect or indeed in librarianship, was very influential and well-connected, being a protege of the man who became Lord chancellor, Lord Braughton. Panizzi secured the services of Sydney Smirke, the son of the museum's previous architect Sir Robert Smirke to build the domed Reading Room and denied having seen Hosking's original domed design, although Smirke admitted this.

Some while after publication of Hosking's controversial book, when Panizzi and Smirke fell out publicly over what their respective contributions were to the design, Sydney Smirke wrote that Panizzi had originally proposed "a flat, low building" and he had persuaded Panizzi of the merits of a domed circular design.

Hosking, thinking no doubt of the less personality-driven approach that could have been achieved by the earlier "open" competition, was left with his own reflections on the matter: from his perspective there was much to do to raise the standard of conduct of public life in London institutions. Faking Literature by K. K. Ruthven, Cambridge Univ. Press, published in 2001, empathises with Hosking and looks at the long history of plagiarism.

== Legacy ==
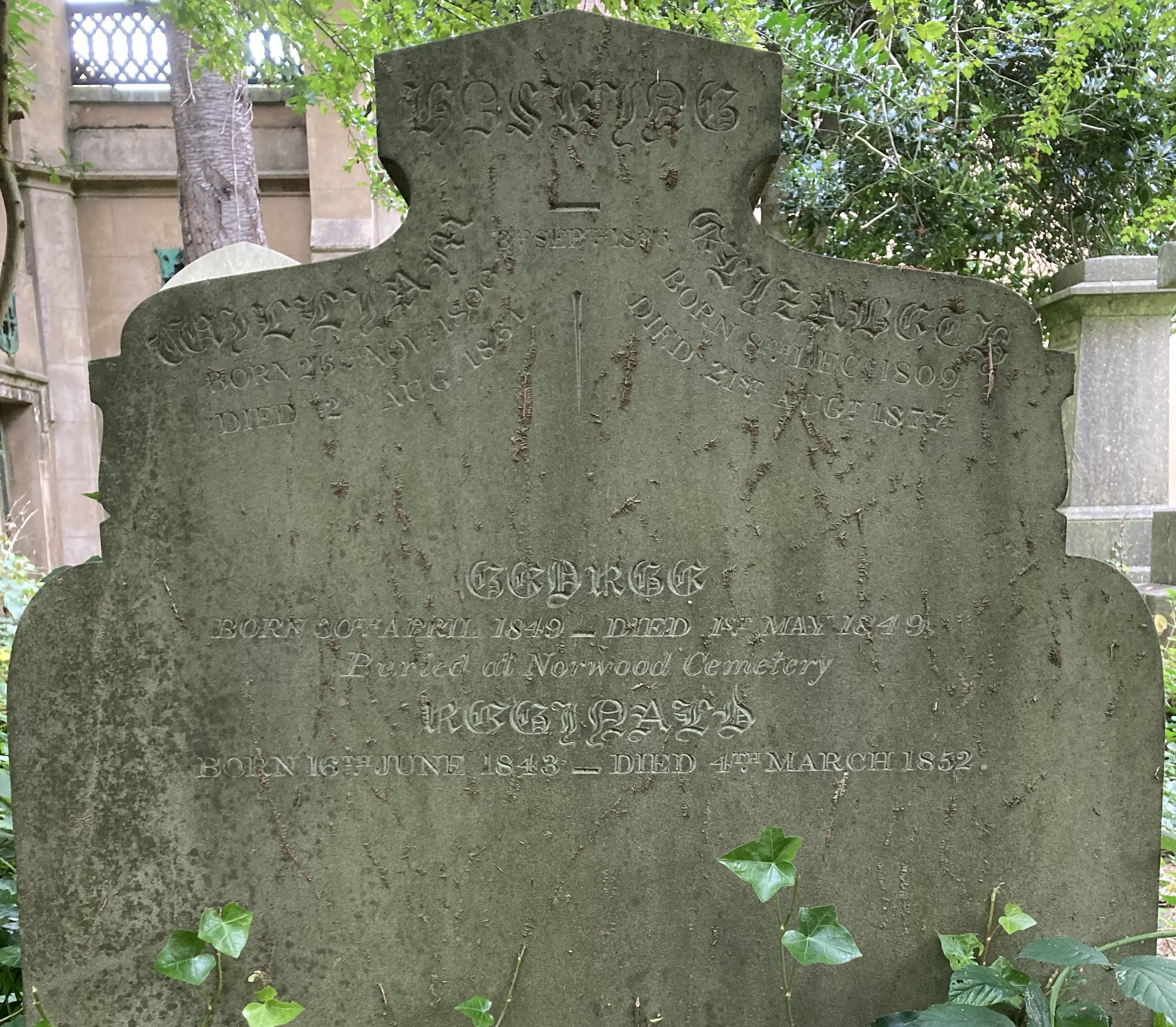
Grave of William Hosking in Highgate Cemetery

Hosking’s career included teaching, writing and architectural design. He held a university professorship, published works on architecture and construction, and contributed to the design of bridges, churches and cemeteries. He also provided advice to official inquiries into town planning and building standards and served as a referee for the Office of Metropolitan Buildings, based at 6 Adelphi Terrace, Charing Cross, London.

Whilst he left a rich legacy of scholarly reports and books, making a valuable contribution to nineteenth century planning and architecture, he had taken a high moral view of public life and his crossing of swords and rebuffs have left a complex legacy for biographers to unravel. Sir William Tite noted that Hosking "wisely refused to recognise the modern distinction between the professions of architect and civil engineer" [The Builder, 1861] - a distinction which has bedevilled both professions ever since.

At least two lasting legacies to his work remain today - the Abney Park Chapel and Temple Lodges at Abney Park Cemetery in Stoke Newington. Today both are listed by English Heritage and the chapel has been described as a "building of exceptional importance" in the English Heritage Magazine.

Nonetheless, he had never quite achieved all he set out to accomplish before he died at 23 Woburn Square on 2 August 1861. He was buried on the western side of Highgate Cemetery, near the Terrace Catacombs.

== Selected publications ==
- Hosking, William (1848) The Regulation of Buildings in Towns
- Hosking, William (1832) Architecture and Building from the Encyclopædia Britannica Seventh Edn.

== Notable buildings ==
- Abney Park Chapel (1838–40)
- Temple Lodges Abney Park (1838–40)
- Trinity Independent Chapel (1840–41)
