= Trinity Independent Chapel =

Victorian church in poplar, London l

Coordinates: 51°30′41″N 0°1′8″W

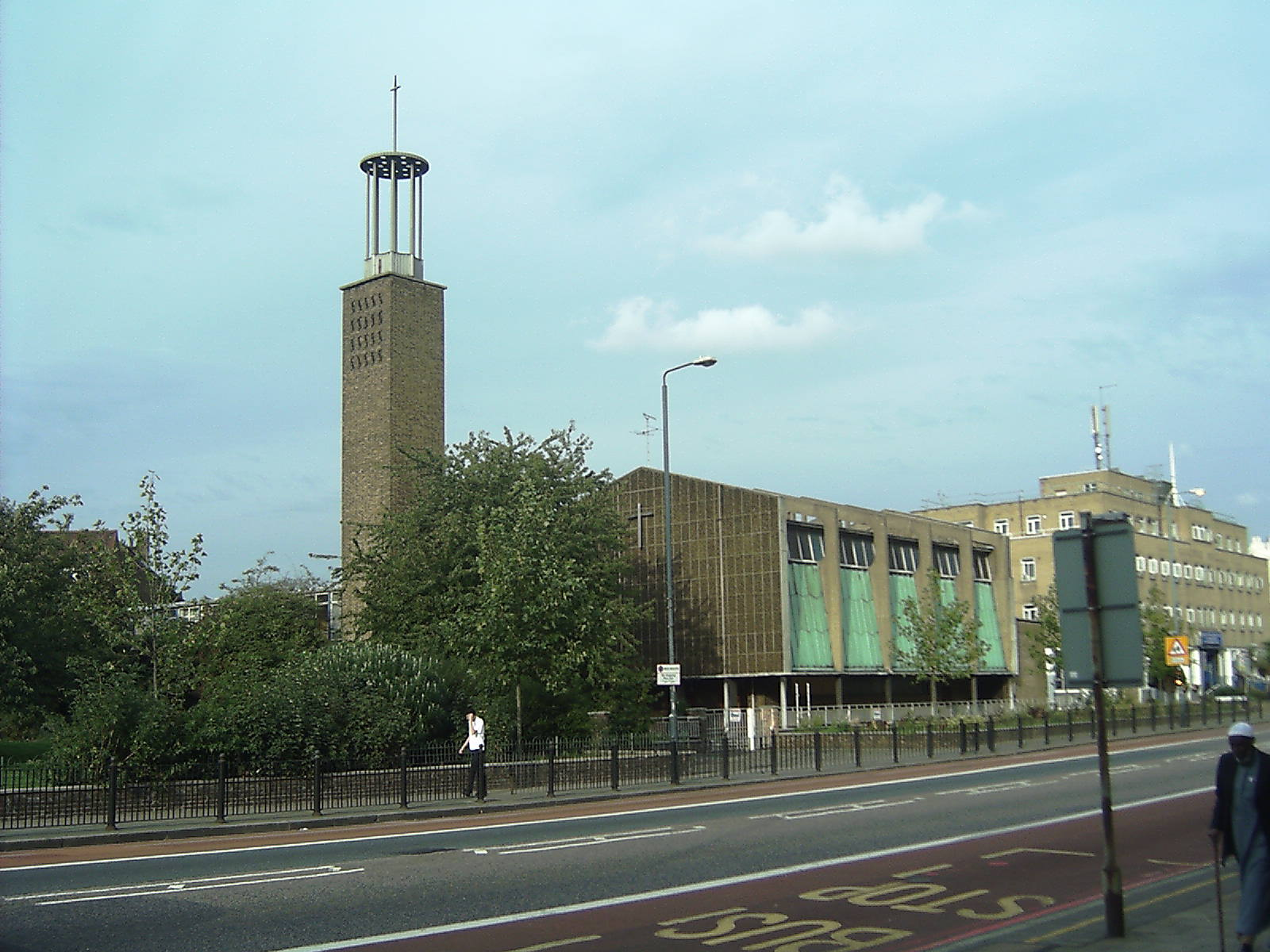
- The New Trinity Congregational Church 1951–present
- Trinity Independent Chapel
- Location: London Borough of Tower Hamlets
- Country: England
- Denomination: Charismatic Baptist, earlier Methodist and Congregationalist

Architecture
- Architect(s): William Hosking and John Jay

The Trinity Independent Chapel (also known as the Congregational or Methodist chapel) was an early Victorian church in Poplar. It was destroyed by a V-2 rocket hit during the Second World War, and later re-built in Modernist style. In the late 1990s the building was sold to the Calvary Charismatic Baptist Church, and since then has served as their Prayer Temple and international headquarters.

== History ==
=== Foundation and design ===
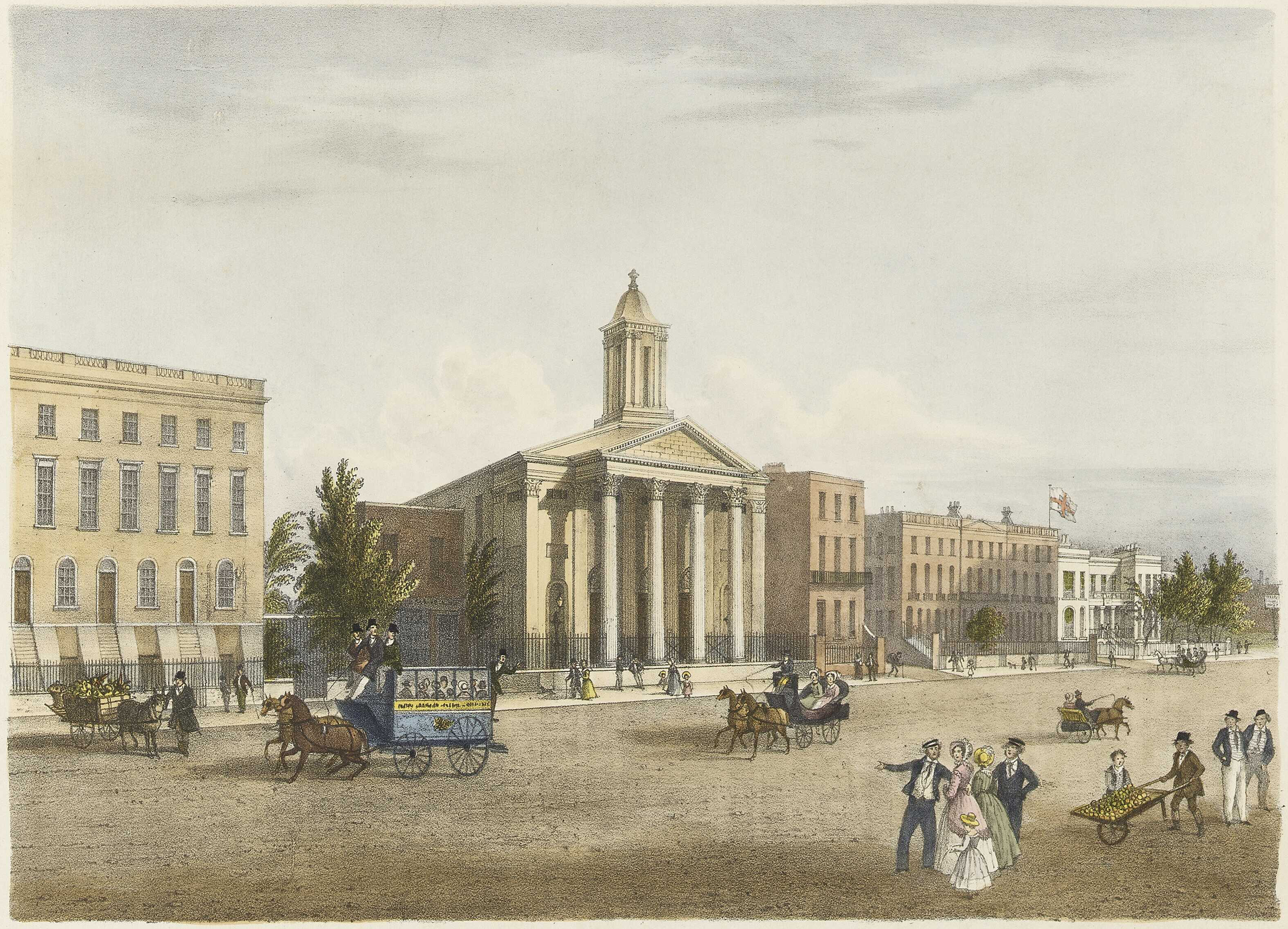
Trinity Chapel, Sailors Home, East India Road, Poplar

The Trinity Independent Chapel was designed in 1840–41 by William Hosking FSA, and built by John Jay. It occupied a site at the corner of East India Dock Road and Augusta Street (Annabel Close) in Poplar, in the Metropolitan Borough of Poplar, near the East India Docks. With its large, elegant frontage—a combination of Grecian and Italian Renaissance styles—directly facing the main road, this lavish building came to dominate its streetscene at a time when chapel architecture in the East London was generally low-key.

The design was financed by the shipyard owner George Green, a prominent local Congregationalist with non-denominational sympathies. Green and Hosking agreed to include a bell in their design, falling foul of the local Anglican clergy. The parish authorities knew of no previous independent meeting house that had incorporated a bell, so they instructed Green and Hosking to render the bell immobile and silent, to prevent it from competing with their parish church. Gradually, as chapel design came more and more to adopt Anglican church architecture (the two often being indistinguishable by the late Victorian era), the bell was allowed to be unfixed.

Green also contributed to many philanthropic causes in Poplar and Blackwall: "minister's house, sailors' home, schools, and almshouses", according to the Survey of London. The Sailors' Home (later Board of Trade offices and other uses, converted into flats in the 1980s) was built at 133 East India Dock Road, beyond the Wesleyan Methodist "Queen Victoria Seaman's Rest". He also endowed George Green's School (1828), which was rebuilt as the George Green Centre at Island Gardens in 1974–1978.

In 1843, the Trinity Chapel Day School was established, also financed by George Green. In 1857, new buildings for 591 children were built in Upper New Street, but following the Elementary Education Act 1870, the school was transferred to the London School Board, who renamed it Upper North Street Board School, now called Mayflower Primary School.

=== 1860-1944 ===
The first minister at Trinity Chapel was the Rev. George Smith (1803–1870), Secretary of the Congregational Union of England and Wales. His pink granite pedestal memorial can be seen today at the non-denominational Abney Park Cemetery in Stoke Newington.

The chapel itself was destroyed by a V-2 rocket hit in 1944. The only part to survive was the bell, which had been salvaged from the bombsite. Having rung in the old chapel for the last time on the morning war was declared in 1939, it was later recast, repaired and incorporated into the new church.

=== Rebuilt ===
The chapel's replacement on the same site, the New Trinity Congregational Church, formed part of the Exhibition of Live Architecture for the Festival of Britain in 1951, as its site abutted the Lansbury Estate development (appropriately named after the Labour politician George Lansbury, who went to prison for dispersing local tax money directly to the needy rather than passing it on to the London County Council). The church was re-built somewhat experimentally in a bold and very modern post-war style, using new materials such as concrete, and new building techniques. Social work continued to be a priority for the church community.
