= Loddiges family =

English plant nursery managers

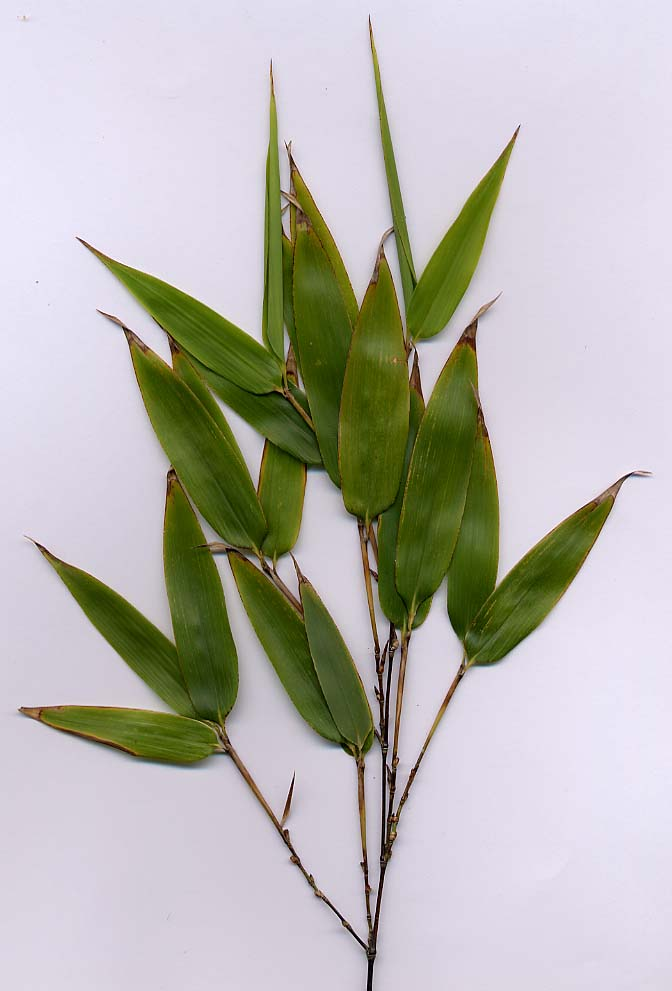
Bamboo foliage with black stems (probably Phyllostachys nigra; a bamboo introduced into western cultivation by Loddiges Nursery)

The Loddiges family (not uncommonly mis-spelt Loddige) managed one of the most notable of the eighteenth and nineteenth century plant nurseries that traded in and introduced exotic plants, trees, shrubs, ferns, palms and orchids into European gardens. The hothouses covered land to the east of Mare Street, Hackney, London E9, including that now occupied by Urswick School.

== Founding and rise ==
The founder of the nursery was Joachim Conrad Loddiges (1738–1826). He was born in Hildesheim, Lower Saxony; his father Casper Lochlies was a gardener to a nobleman in Wrisbergholzen, near Hannover. Conrad trained in The Netherlands and emigrated to Britain at the age of 19 during the Seven Years' War to take up employment as gardener for Dr J. B. Silvester in the suburban village of Hackney, north of London. It was then that the family name was anglicised. When in his forties he married, he had not accumulated sufficient savings to expand a small seed business started by fellow German émigré John Busch, which he purchased, together with the good will of Busch's clientele in 1771 and had fully paid for by 1777, by which time he began to write to people all over the world, urging them to send him packets of seeds collected from trips to native hills, valleys and plains. From these small beginnings, its initial catalogue appearing in 1777 the nursery business gained a specialist market in Britain, and was increasingly able to attract clients from estates and botanical gardens throughout Europe.

The nursery rose to great prominence during the early nineteenth century under his son, George Loddiges (1786–1846). From 1818 to 1833 Conrad and Sons published 20 issues of The Botanical Cabinet, a magazine consisting of over 1000 coloured plates of rare plants that were introduced from around the world into the nursery's gardens and hothouses. The largest hothouses in the world were built to display the best collection of palms and orchids in Europe. George Loddiges also linked the nursery into the scientific circles of the day, becoming a Fellow of the Microscopical Society (FMS), Fellow of the Linnean Society (FLS), Fellow of the Horticultural Society (FHS), and Fellow of the Zoological Society (FZS) in London, for he had wide interests in scientific subjects beyond botany, becoming particularly knowledgeable about early microscopy and one aspect of ornithology (humming-birds). Abroad the nursery's influence spread to the imperial gardens of St Petersburg in Russia and the first Botanical Gardens at Adelaide in South Australia in 1839, by John Bailey who started with Conrad Loddiges in 1815.

Although the business closed in the 1850s, it leaves its legacy in many of our gardens and parks, since a number of commonly used attractive plants were first introduced into cultivation by Loddiges Nursery.

=== Origins under Joachim Conrad Loddiges ===
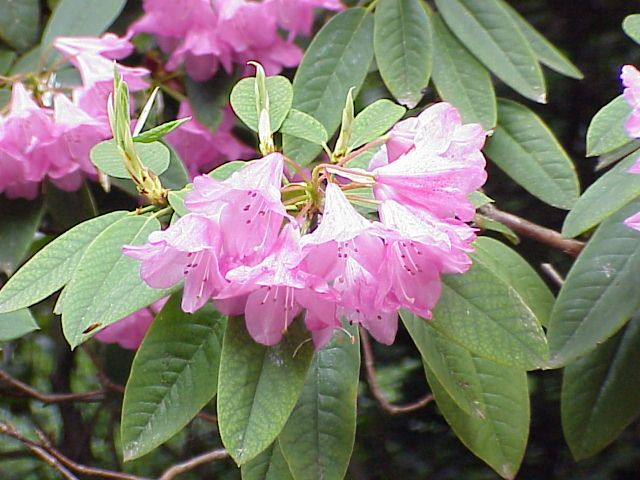
The Common Mauve Rhododendron introduced into Britain by Conrad Loddiges

On 2 January 1770, following his marriage, Joachim Conrad Loddiges wrote to his longstanding employer, Dr Silvester, asking for advice about his plan to move on from head gardener and grounds keeper, and set up a small seed and gardening business in the village of Hackney, north of London, with assistance from a fellow German emigree, Johann (syn. John) Busch. Busch was appointed as chief gardener to Catherine the Great and the two remained in contact - it is through this connection that the Loddiges had a role in importing and establishing rhubarb in Britain. Seed packets were received from all over the world, sometimes from well-known botanical explorers such as John Bartram and William Bartram in North America (who also favoured Quaker horticulturalists such as Peter Collinson with discoveries), and sometimes from ordinary travelers.

One of the first plant species to be introduced into cultivation in Britain by Conrad Loddiges was the Common Mauve Rhododendron, Rhododendron ponticum. He introduced this into England in the early 1760s while working as a gardener for Dr Silvester of Hackney, prior to setting up his own seed and nursery business. The young plants were supplied to the Marquis of Rockingham whose interest led to great enthusiasm for growing the species in British gardens.

=== Prominence under George Loddiges ===
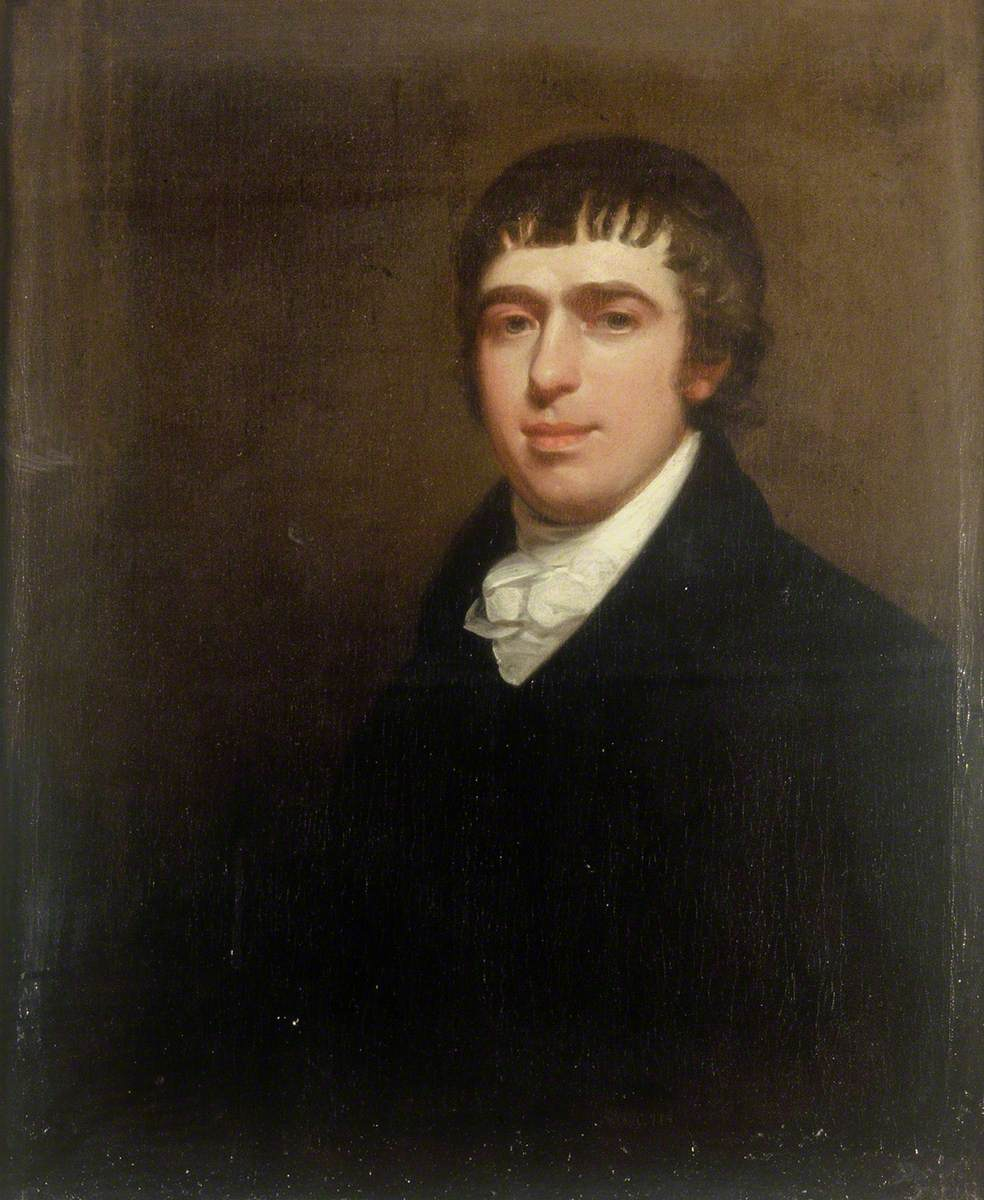
George Loddiges

Conrad's son George Loddiges is generally credited with raising the profile of the exotic Hackney nursery at least as greatly, if not more so, than his eminent horticulturalist father. In 1833 the Loddiges began using the newly developed Wardian Case to transport live plants from Australia, and also had a keen interest in microscopy and hummingbirds, one of which, the Marvelous Spatuletail, was named in his honour.

For example, the term 'arboretum' was first used in an English publication by J. C. Loudon in 1833 in The Gardener's Magazine when commenting on George Loddiges' famous Hackney Botanic Garden arboretum, begun in 1816, and open free to the public for educational benefit every Sunday. Loudon wrote: The arboretum looks better this season than it has ever done since it was planted... the more lofty trees suffered from the late high winds, but not materially. We walked round the two outer spirals of this coil of trees and shrubs; viz. from Acer to Quercus. There is no garden scene about London so interesting.

A plan of George Loddiges' arboretum was included in The Encyclopaedia of Gardening 1834 edition, and the interest this aroused helped inspire Loudon to write his encyclopaedic book Arboretum et Fruticetum Britannicum, first published in 1838. Although this incorporated drawings from several early botanic gardens and parklands throughout the UK, it relied greatly upon, and would not have been possible without, George Loddiges' well labeled arboretum. It was on the collection maintained by this firm more than any other that J.C.Loudon relied for living material in the preparation of his great work W.J.Bean notes in Trees and Shrubs Hardy in the British Isles, today's standard reference work.

Another notable visitor was Charles Darwin who in September 1838 wrote Saw in Loddiges garden 1279 varieties of roses!!! Proof of capability of variation

Although George Loddiges' arboretum was widely praised, his better known horticultural endeavor was to establish the world's largest hothouse in his Hackney Botanic Nursery, and invent a system of warm mist-like rain to maintain tropical palms, epiphytic orchids, ferns, and camellias in almost perfect environmental conditions akin to a 'tropical rainforest'.

George Loddiges' tropical hothouse range made use of recently invented curvilinear iron glazing bars and central heating systems, which together with his own inventions, enabled many new species of tropical plant to be introduced into cultivation, or flower for the first time in Europe. Visiting the hothouses on 30 March 1822, the Quaker pharmacist William Allen, his Cousin Emily Birkbeck and Anna Hanbury noted: We all went to Loddiges Nursery to see the camellias which are now in full bloom and very beautiful ! There is quite a forest of them: his hot-houses are, perhaps, the most capricious in the world: one off them is forty feet high: in this there is a banana tree which nearly reaches the top. A few years later, in 1829, Jacob Rinz (a visitor from a Frankfurt nursery) commented: never shall I forget the sensation produced by this establishment. I cannot describe the raptures I experienced on seeing that immense palm house. All that I had seen before of the kind appeared nothing to me compared with this. I fancied myself in the Brazils; and especially at that moment when Mr Loddiges had the kindness to produce, in my presence, a shower of artificial rain. Such conditions were ideal for tropical orchids, several of which were named in honour of George Loddiges, including Loddiges' dendrobium.

So infectious was the interest that George Loddiges and fellow nurserymen created during the early nineteenth century in the splendour of new ferns, trees, palms - indeed plants of all kinds - that he was prompted to begin marketing a series of volumes containing coloured engravings of the many new species and varieties. Entitled The Botanical Cabinet it ran to twenty volumes and 2,000 plates. Facing each plant portrait, George Loddiges added a few lines of text outlining the source of the seeds and invariably adding a religious perspective. Many of the drawings for the publications were made by George himself, his daughter Jane and the young Edward Cooke who became a leading Victorian artist, and whose father, George Cooke, engraved a number of the plates.

The Horticultural Society awarded George Loddiges numerous medals throughout this period: Silver Medal, 1818, 1819; Silver Medal (Sir Joseph Banks Memorial Portrait Prize), 1823, 1826, 1832, 1835; President's Silver Medal, 1836; Silver Flora Medal, 1837.

In the late 1830s, George Loddiges became involved in the design and landscaping of one of the Magnificent Seven London garden cemeteries associated with burial reform: Abney Park Cemetery. Sensitively preserving the existing early eighteenth century parkland laid out by Lady Mary Abney and Isaac Watts, he introduced an educational landscape around the perimeter which was open to the public free of charge: a vast arboretum of 2,500 species and varieties, labelled alphabetically from A to Z rather than arranged in a more conventional way. Close to the Abney Park Chapel he also laid out a rosarium to complement the chapel's 'botanical rose windows' (described as 'botanical' owing to their unusual ten-part arrangement, as in the five sepals and five petals of the rose family, or petals of a simple rose including indentations as shown in the White Rose of York). George Loddiges also appears to have influenced the architect William Hosking and client George Collison II in their final choice of Egyptian Revival ornamentation for the main entrance, since the Egyptian-style entrance pylons incorporate the botanical imagery of the Egyptian White Lily or Lotus, a plant introduced into western cultivation by Loddiges Nursery in 1802.

In May 1838, John James Audubon published the fifth, and final, volume of his "Ornithological Biography", the textual supplement to his epic "Birds of America" series of 435 plates (1826-1838). Writing about the "Anna Humming Bird" in the Ornithological Biography, Audubon wrote, "...Those [figures/paintings] of the male I made from specimens, for the use of which I am indebted to Mr. Loddiges, of London, whose collection of Humming Birds is unrivaled." (In June 2018 an original, 4-volume edition of the Birds of America sold at a Christie's auction for $9.65 million).

=== Closure under Conrad Loddiges II ===
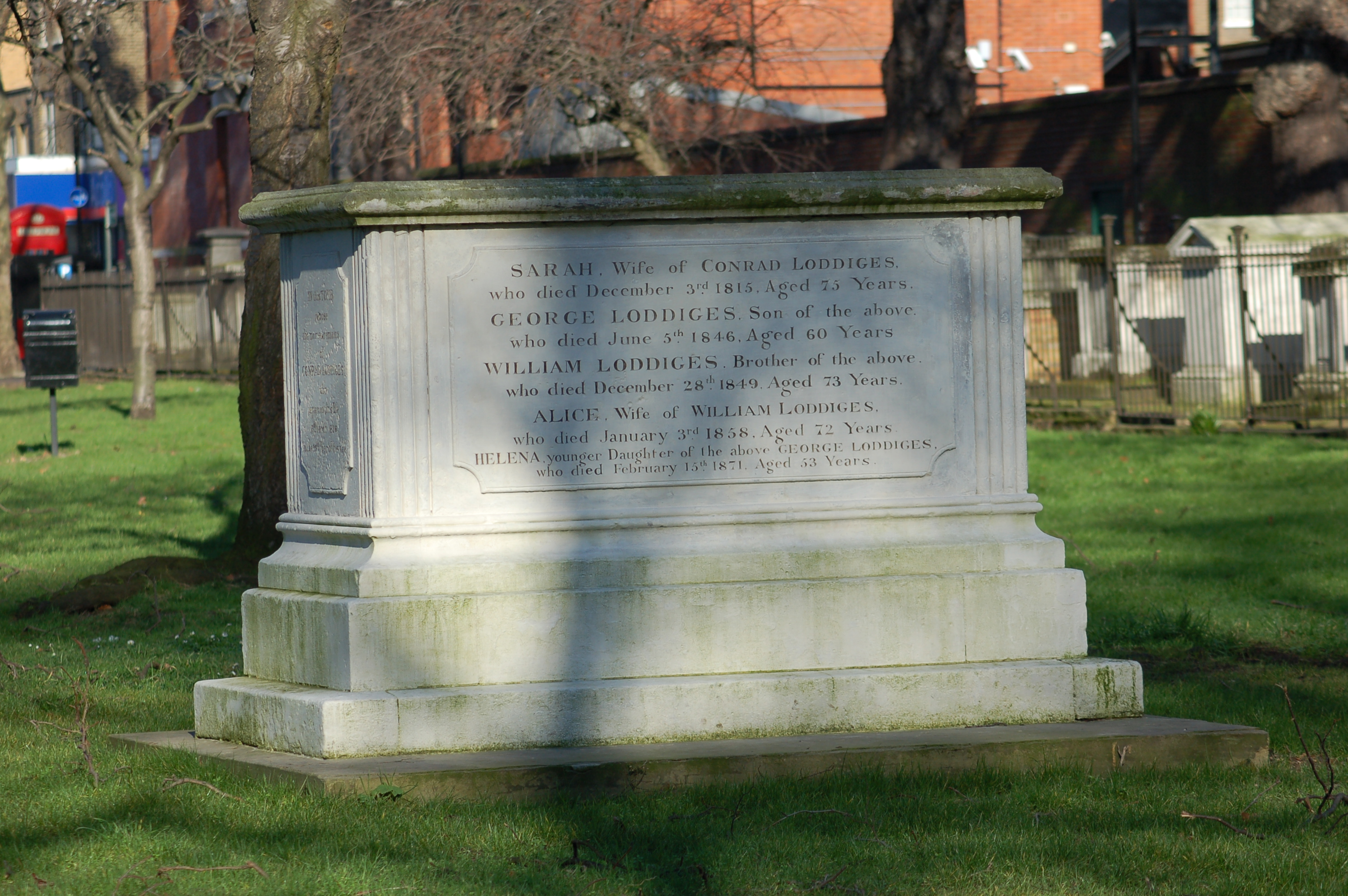
Loddiges' family vault in St John's Church Gardens

On the death of George Loddiges in 1846, the nursery business passed to his son Conrad Loddiges II (1821–1865), who found it increasingly difficult to negotiate a new lease from the land-owner (St. Thomas' Hospital), given the much higher prices the land could now command for housing development, due to London's growth into the surrounding countryside. Similarly, the part of the nursery that was owned by the Loddiges family in freehold, was becoming more valuable as building land, whilst losing its attractive countryside village setting. Conrad was involved with the display of ferns and terrariums for the Great Exhibition. The nursery closed in stages between 1852 and 1854 due to expiry of the lease from St. Thomas' Hospital. Conrad Loddiges II offered the whole of the exotic plant stock to Kew Gardens for a sum of £9000 (20 years earlier the collection was valued at £200,000) but this was refused. Many rare plants were auctioned via Stevens auctioneers, including rare orchids sold to John Day who would later become famous as a botanical illustrator. Joseph Paxton purchased 300 palms and plants for the opening of the new Crystal Palace at Sydenham. The Illustrated London News of 5 August 1854 illustrated plumed horses pulling a giant palm tree through the City of London on its way to be prominently displayed by Paxton in time for the opening of the Crystal Palace by Queen Victoria.

=== Burial and remembrance ===
Today, memorials to members of the Loddiges family can be seen in the gardens of the Church of St John-at-Hackney and Abney Park Cemetery.
