= Functional brief =

A functional brief, in project management, is a document that talks about the functional specifications of the product that is being developed. A well-defined functional brief allows for all stakeholders to be aware of the scope of the product, the intended functionality and when finalized ensures that there is no feature creep. Once the document is created it is used to conduct a feasibility study and can be used to develop costs and time estimates of the final product.

The document should highlight:

- The major functional aspects of the product,
- How they are intended to interact and their inter-dependencies,
- How the product being developed matches the organization's goals and policies,
- How the user would interact with the product and
- What output they intend to obtain from the product.

The functional brief can also contain information about the future plans for the product so that developers can ensure that while designing the product these considerations are included.
