= Brief (architecture) =

In architecture, a brief is a statement of a client's requirements, which form the basis for appointing an architect. The brief describes the requirements that need to be reconciled and accommodated, and is developed first as a design which is submitted for approval, and subsequently constructed as a building or other structure. A brief is a written document that might be anything from a single page to a multiple volume set of documents. The term program is often used today, in conjunction with, and in part as a synonym of, an "architectural brief". "Program" (also referred to as "architectural program" or "facility program") is used more often in the United States whereas "brief" is used internationally. An architect's design is considered the response to the building program.

== Development of the brief ==
The architectural brief is often formulated by, or in collaboration with, the architect. It often includes opportunities assessed, constraints identified and needs for further investigation clarified.

In the early stages of the design process the brief may be continuously reappraised as the requirements become clearer - this is known as 'firming up the brief'. Ultimately, a clear set of instructions setting out the overarching goals and detailed requirements will emerge which form the starting point of the architect's designs and will be continually tested against, as designs are progressed.

== Input for the brief ==
The development of a brief is a process of forming a clear list of the client’s and building users’ needs through different workplace research methods.

== Schedule of accommodation ==
In the later stages of writing a brief, a schedule of accommodation is sometimes drawn up that will specify precisely the number and size of rooms that will be required, the relationships between rooms and groups of rooms, the finishes, equipment, furniture that will fit the room for its functional purpose and the environmental conditions that will assist the purpose. Environmental conditions might include temperature range, humidity, air movement, acoustic isolation, etc..The schedule of accommodation is prepared by an expert to help in determining the minimum space required on site to develop and finish a given design. The schedule of accommodation is guided by the brief analysis of every space since every space have set standards and requirement.

== Complex briefs ==
For complex facilities, the brief may be prepared by a specialist consultant, separate from the design architect. In such projects, workshops are often employed with project participants: owners, users, customers, facility experts, builders/contractors and other designers brought together for an intensive one- or two-day period to devise the critical aspects of the brief.

If the brief will provide a large number of similar spaces, for example, in a hospital, then room/space 'types' might be defined, as a type of 'space dictionary' that is then used to inform room or space groupings. These space groupings are then assembled into related sets of rooms to meet a functional or service requirement. The critical component of the related sets is that the interactions between rooms are set out, with details as to the type of interaction. For example, if escorted patients, beds and medical equipment are to be moved, or if individuals or groups of people will move between spaces, the architect's design will need to acknowledge the different design responses to be made.

The information used to assemble a 'space dictionary' can be quite detailed, with a schedule produced that lists, for each room, parameters, the requirement against the parameter, and any particular performance needs.

Parameters might include: population (median and peak), area, minimum height, floor loading, floor finish and skirting requirements, including any plinths, hobs or set-downs, wall finishes, including wall protection needs (pertinent in hospitals, warehouses, etc.), ceiling finish, including acoustic needs, engineering services required: power, lighting, air-conditioning, water, drainage, communications, etc.; environmental conditions: air temperature, humidity, noise level, air movement; access and security needs; FFE (furniture, fittings and equipment), with note made of mass, dimensions, power requirements, energy evolved, noise produced, ventilation and extraction needed, service and operating clearances; fire safety.

A thorough brief will start with a definition of the services or functions to be accommodated, decomposing these functions into specific sub-functions and then to activities. A 'functional brief' is thus compiled. This brief is used to, in turn, create the architectural brief, that sets out the accommodation specifics for preparation of design options.

== Evaluation ==
For critical facilities, the project manager or owner may require the architect to validate the design against the brief, producing a report that shows in tabular form, how and where, the design meets the brief. This avoids misunderstanding of drawings that can arise when non-experts are asked to review them. A graphical validation might include demonstration of the movement expected between spaces, and show how a proximity diagram is modeled onto the design layout.
