= George Loddiges =

British gardener, artist, and naturalist

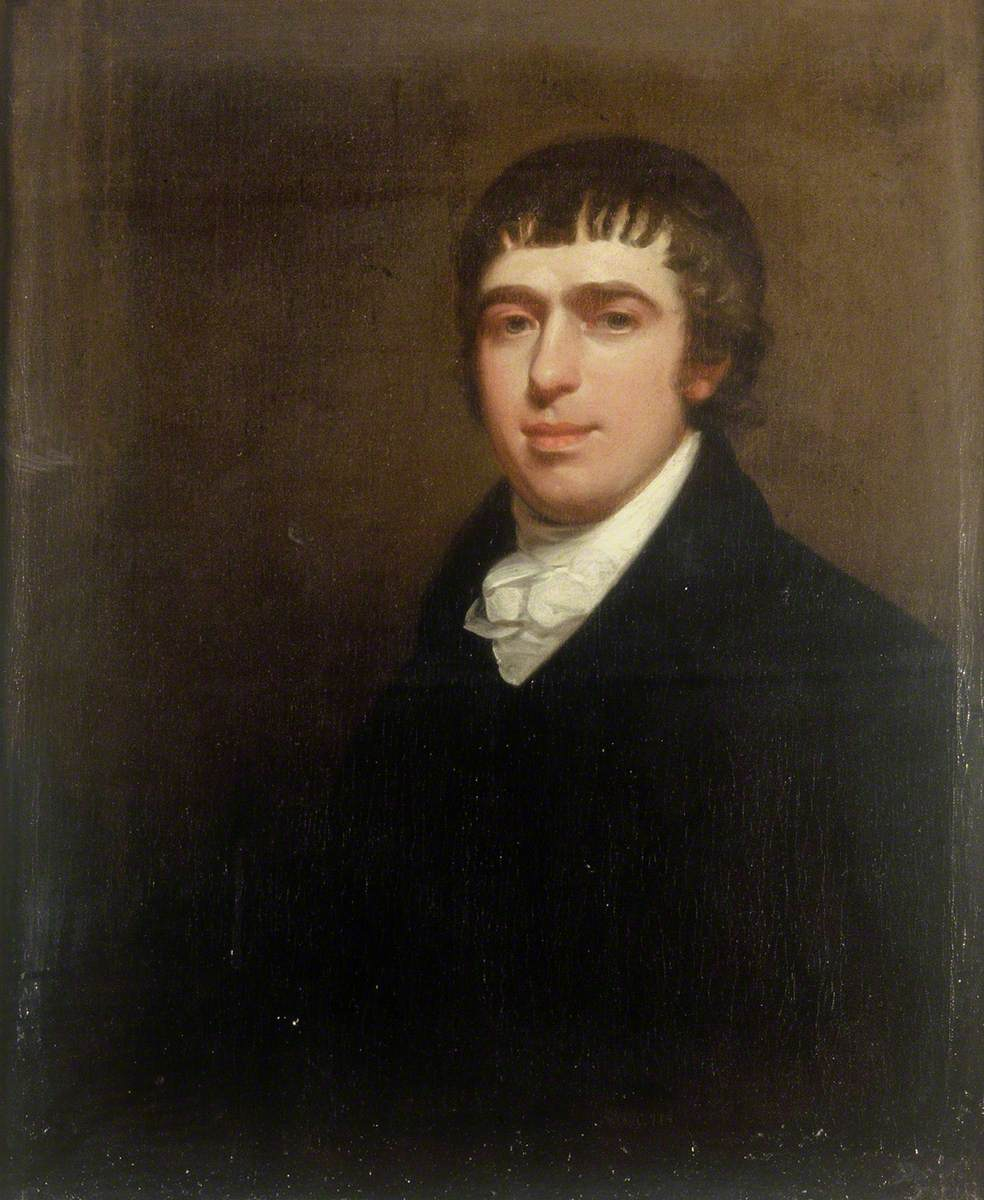

George Loddiges (1784/1786 – 5 May 1846) was a British gardener, artist, and naturalist. He worked in the nursery business established by his father and illustrated nearly 2000 plates of plants in the nursery's own periodical, the Botanical Cabinet, published between 1817 and 1833. He also planned a book on the hummingbirds but this was not published. The hummingbird genus Loddigesia is named after him.

George was born in Hackney, Middlesex. Some give the date as 12 March 1786, while other sources suggest 1784. He was the son of Joachim Conrad Loddiges (c.1738–1826) and Sarah Aldous. Joachim Loddiges was a German-born nurseryman who founded Conrad Loddiges and Sons, one of the largest nurseries in the 1800s. Along with his brother William, George also trained in the trade of plants and the management of nurseries. The family managed special greenhouses and a 9 acre arboretum for tropical plants and were reputed for their collections of palms and orchids. George Loddiges was involved in establishing the Abney Park cemetery garden in 1839-40. The Loddiges worked with plant collectors from around the world as well as botanists. Hugh Cuming was one of their collectors and Nathaniel Ward was a friend. Several species of plant have been named after members of the Loddiges family.

Loddiges was a member of the councils of the Linnean Society, the Horticultural Society, and the Microscopical Society. He had a collection of 200 species of hummingbirds which were acquired by the British Museum of Natural History in 1933. He had planned to publish a book on the hummingbirds.

He married Jane Creighton (1787–1859) in 1811 and they had a son, Conrad, and two daughters, one of whom was married to the artist Edward William Cooke. Loddiges died in Hackney, and was buried at St John-at-Hackney. The nursery was taken over by his son Conrad.
