= George Collison =

British Congregationalist leader (1772–1847)

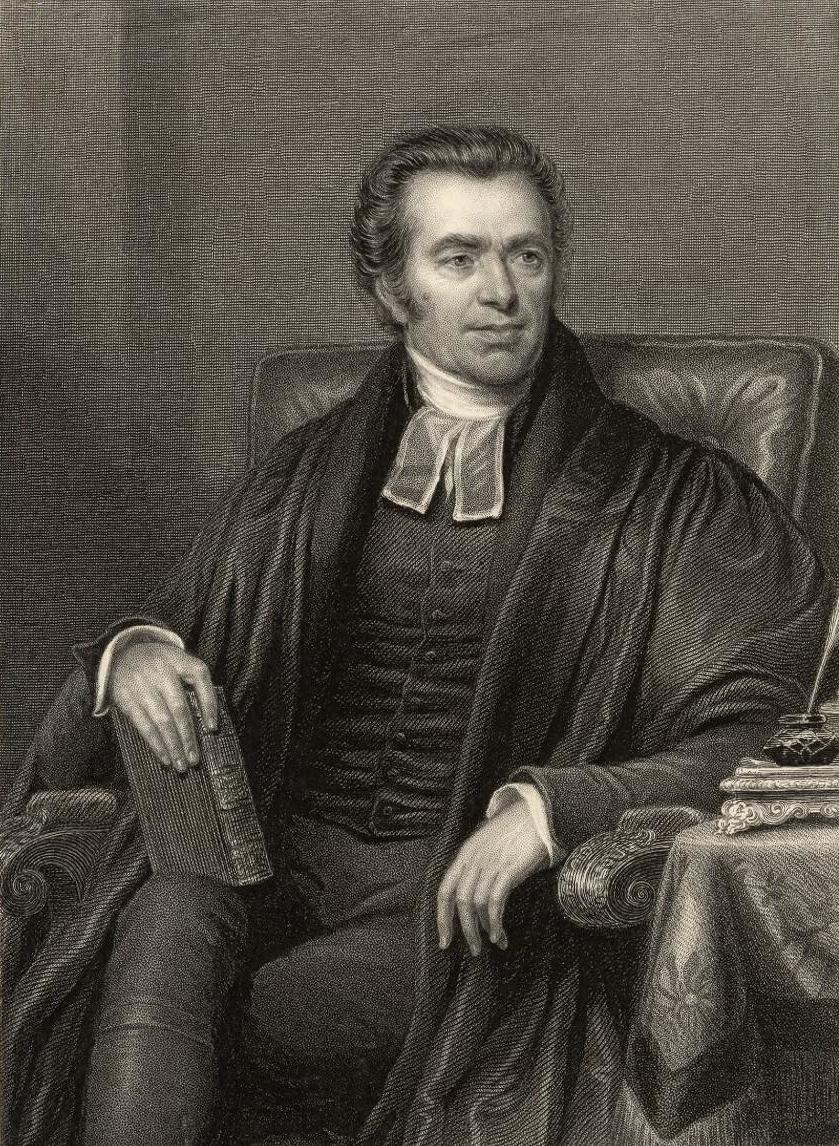
1839 engraving of George Collison

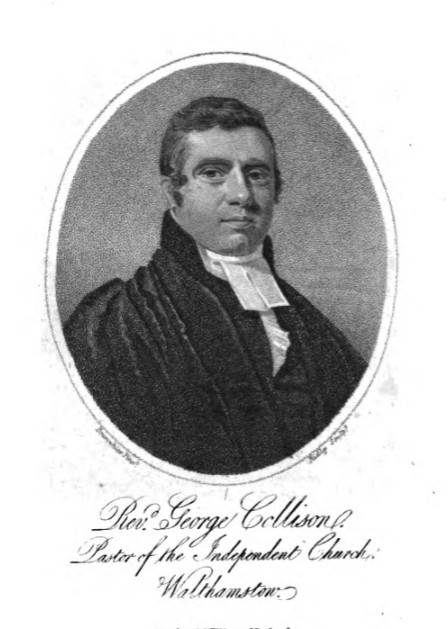
George Collison, 1811 engraving

George Collison (1772–1847) was an English Congregationalist and educator associated with Hackney Academy or Hackney College, which became part of New College London—itself part of the University of London.

== Early life ==
Collison was born in Beverley, Yorkshire, on 6 January 1772, and became articled to a solicitor in Bridlington. Taking a keen interest in the local Independent Chapel, he became an early Sunday school teacher, and in 1792 decided to give up law and train full-time as a minister at Hoxton College near London. In 1797 he settled close to London in the village of Walthamstow in Essex to carry out pastoral duties, becoming the minister of Marsh Street Congregational Chapel, in whose grounds he was buried in 1847. He undertook this ministerial role whilst also tutoring at Hoxton—until ill health led him to give up the latter in 1801. Detached from Hoxton, he was sought after by other educationalists, and was attracted to an offer to become the founding President and first tutor of a new theological institution, the Hackney Academy. This was to be based on the non-denominational principles George Collison was already familiar with, in his early associations with the London Missionary Society.

== Founding of the Hackney Academy (Hackney College) ==
The Hackney Theological Seminary began in 1802 as a philanthropic non-denominational venture promoted by the Anglican Rev. John Eyre of Homerton, Secretary of the London Missionary Society and the Independent Rev. George Collison, with their associates. It started in Hackney village in 1803, gradually grew, moved across the city, and, long after Collison's death, it became part of the University of London.

On taking up the Presidency of the Hackney Academy in 1803, Collison continued some of his pastoral duties at Walthamstow, but was succeeded in similar work for a small congregation he had recently gathered in Hackney at the Well Street Chapel. Here, his successor, the Rev. Mr Hughes, inherited a rapidly growing interest locally in Independent worship, and his congregation grew so rapidly that little time passed before a larger Independent chapel (Trinity Chapel) had to be built in nearby Devonshire Road. Collison found a philanthropic use for his original chapel; it became the Well Street Chapel Free School, established in 1807 with generous endowments that covered the cost of educating sixty poor children and orphans who made use of the chapel itself for religious aspects of their attendance and had their school rooms and facilities at the back.

== Collison's Students ==
One of the Rev. George Collison's best known students was the philanthropist and founder of the London Orphan Asylum, the Rev. Dr Andrew Reed (1787–1862). Reed, who entered the college in 1807 and was ordained in 1811, became closely associated with Wycliffe Chapel in Shoreditch, where he remained pastor until 27 November 1861.

One of the Rev. George Collison's other students, Isaac Phillips, was involved in a trial at The Old Bailey. In 1822 he gave evidence against James Hamilton, a local painter and decorator who had returned to george Collisons house and college after carrying out refurbishments, to steal Isaac Phillips' purse containing fifty sovereigns. At that date such a considerable theft might have attracted a capital punishment, but the defendant appealed to the Rev. George Collison to save his life. He was found guilty of stealing and imprisoned for one year.

== George Collison II ==
The Rev. George Collison had one daughter, Hannah; and a son, George Collison II. George II took up his father's previous occupation – law – and became Secretary and Registrar of the Abney Park Cemetery Company when it was founded in the late 1830s; he is considered to be the cemetery's founder. It was his initial research, including a visit to Massachusetts to observe the New World's non-denominational approach to cemetery design at Mount Auburn, and a study of London burial statistics designed to show a sufficiency of income from burials to maintain Abney Park as a historic parkland, that enabled his project to succeed. His close links to wealthy City Congregationalists, and to Congregational Ministers, also enabled him to form an unusually like-minded group of backers to launch and finance the venture.

All of the founders of the Abney Park Cemetery joint stock company were, like Collison, Congregationalists. The Congregationalists of London were already familiar with leading an avowedly non-denominational enterprise promoted largely by Congregationalists; their parallel in this regard being the London Missionary Society. George Collison II acted on behalf of the Abney Park Cemetery Joint Stock Company, to press their 'New World' idea for a garden cemetery with a unique non-denominational design philosophy similar to the Congregationalists' approach to missionary work. George worked as the client representative to guide the company's architect William Hosking and its botanist and nurseryman George Loddiges.

Underpinning his philosophical and urban design ideas, was George Collison's studies of the cemeteries of Europe and, more importantly of North America. His ideas were new to European cemetery design; influenced partly by Mount Auburn Cemetery near Boston in Massachusetts which he visited in the 1830s. In the 1860s the cemetery's chaplain Thomas Barker was to write of the cemetery as 'sweet Abney' echoing the well-known poem 'Sweet Auburn' and adding that 'it is a spot of rare, if not unsurpassed loveliness; as a resting-place for the good it is indeed the most picturesque'. More directly, in 1840, George Collison himself wrote that: 'Mount Auburn, near Boston... may be considered a kind of prototype of the rest, is an object of transcendent interest to the traveller, and, is in a great degree similar to our own cemetery at Abney Park'. This remark about the weight Collison accorded to Mount Auburn Cemetery, together with Collison's wider cemetery studies, were collated and published in his methodical review and reflection entitled:

- Cemetery Interment...Descriptions of Pere la Chaise, the Eastern Cemeteries, And those of America.. and more particularly of the Abney Park Cemetery Company 1840.

This learned volume set out a meticulous listing of all the trees and shrubs commissioned for the Abney Park A to Z Arboretum, and for ornamental beds around the chapel, and for its rosarium of over one thousand cultivars, varieties and species; together with a potential design for a monument to commemorate the life of Dr Isaac Watts whose association with the Abney estate had been a principal motivation for Collison's commercial cemetery scheme, which appears to an extent to have become a vehicle to finance the preservation of, and public access to, the revered Abney Park.

George Collison II was a keen promoter of there being a commemorative statue to Isaac Watts in London, and helped establish a committee to take the idea forwards. An early design was illustrated as the frontispiece to above book; and an eventual design by Edward Hodges Baily was adopted in 1844/5 with the support of city and religious philanthropists, but by this date George Collison had left the cemetery company in which he had formerly been so closely involved; he appears to have moved to Tenby by 1861 and died at Hereford in 1867.
