= Homer Street =

One-way street in Westminster

Coordinates: 51.5194°N 0.1647°W

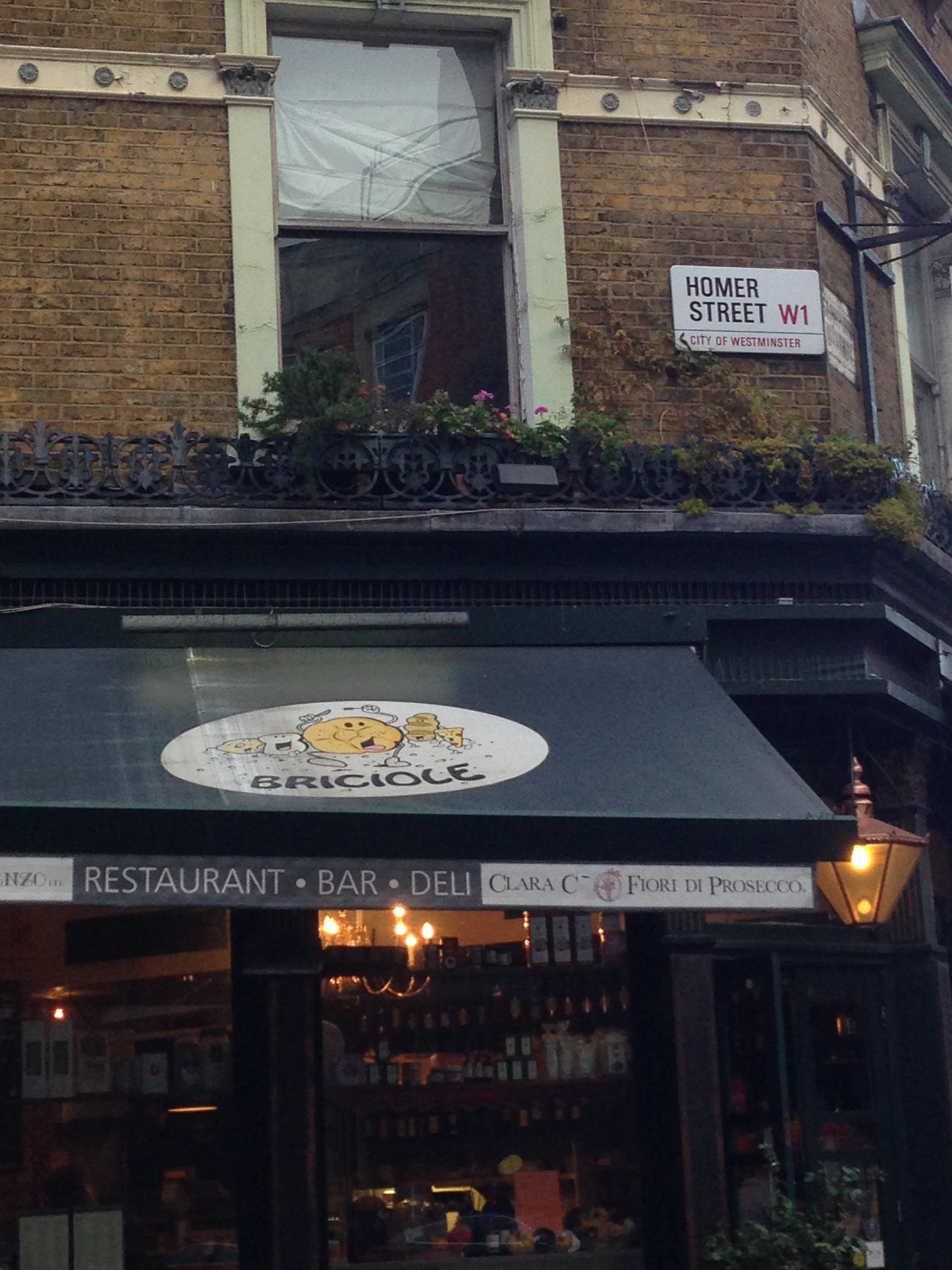
Homer Street, from the corner of Crawford Street

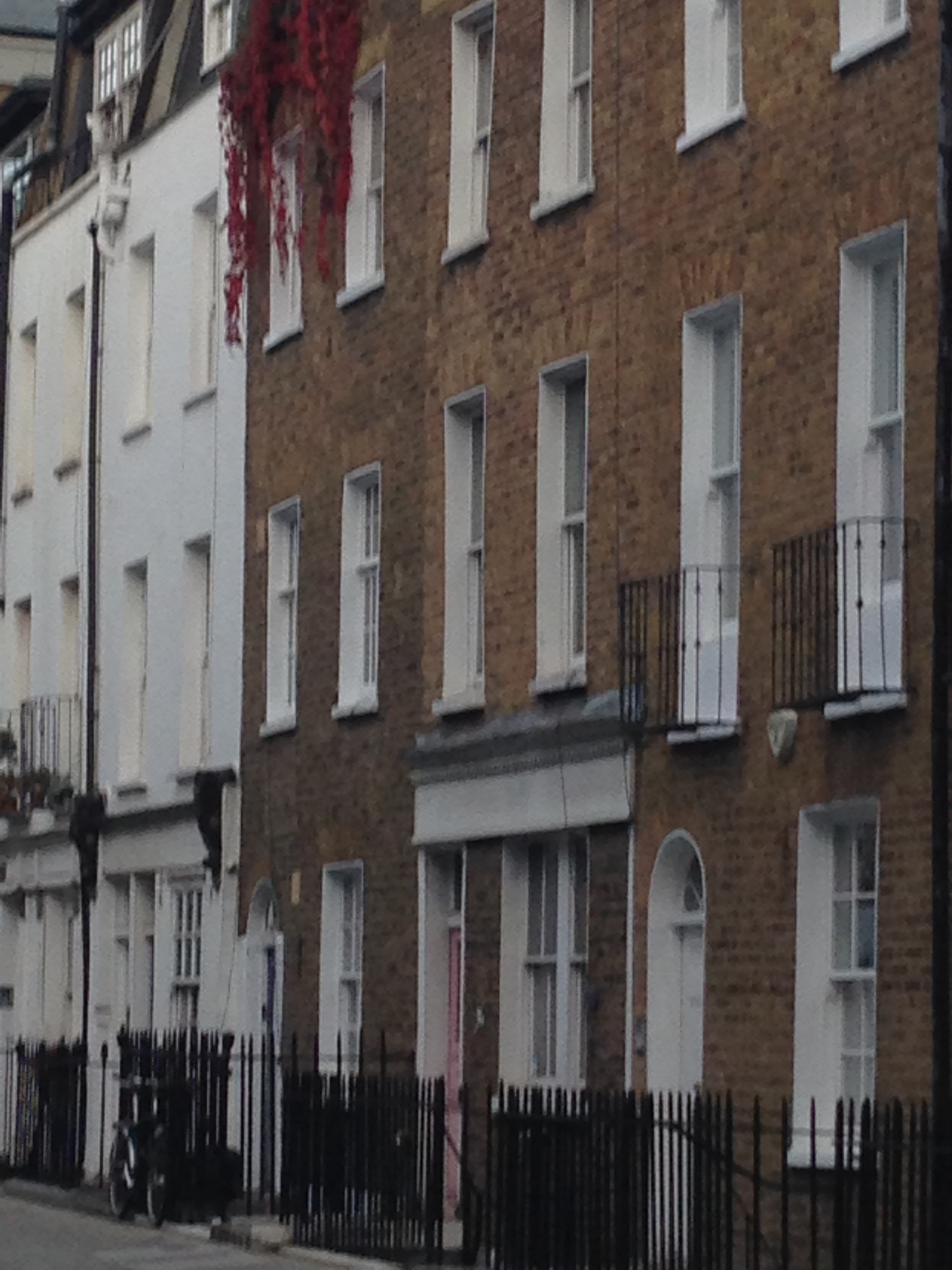
Georgian townhouses, east side of Homer Street

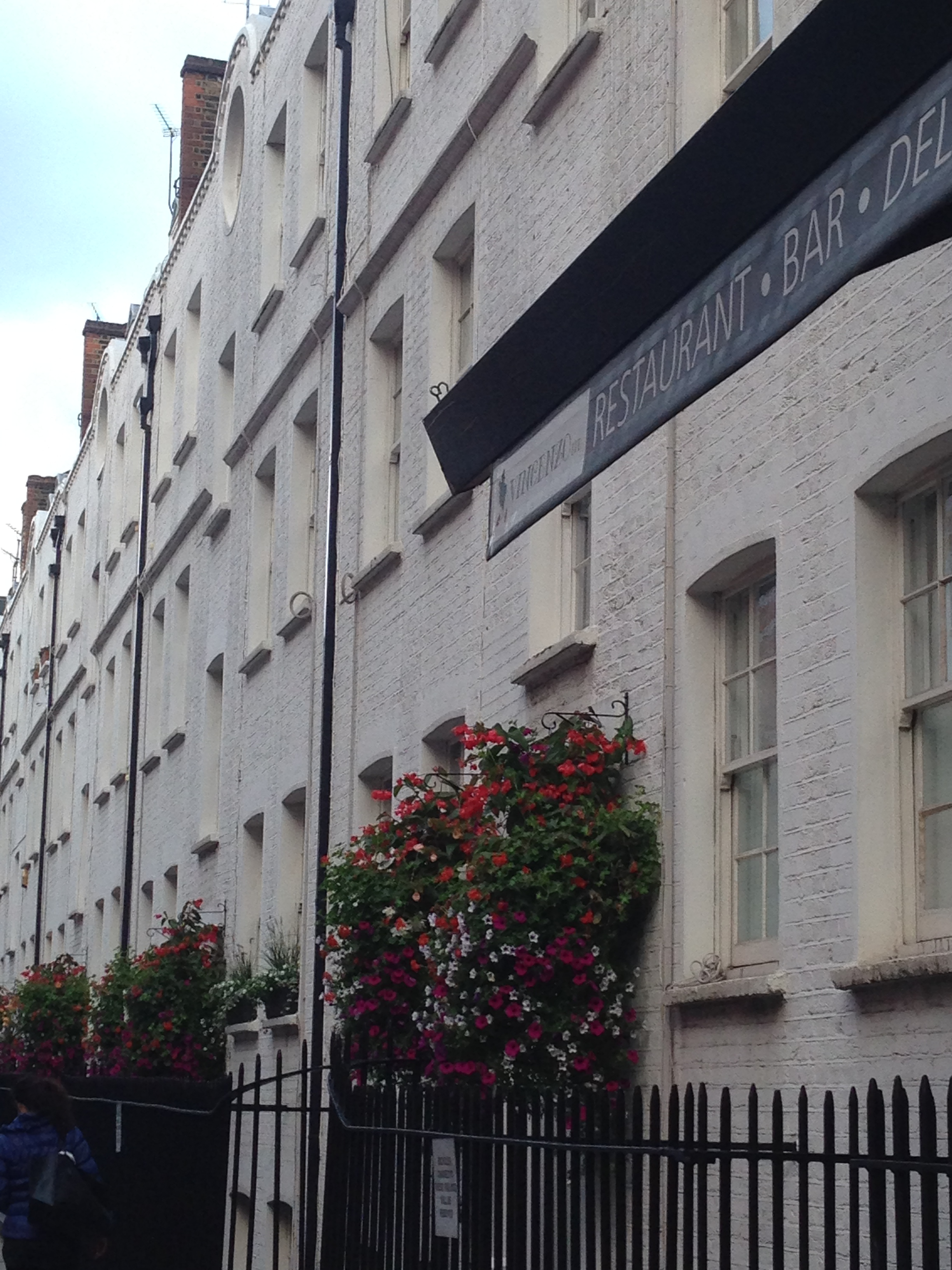
Cranfield Court, an Edwardian mansion block in Homer Street

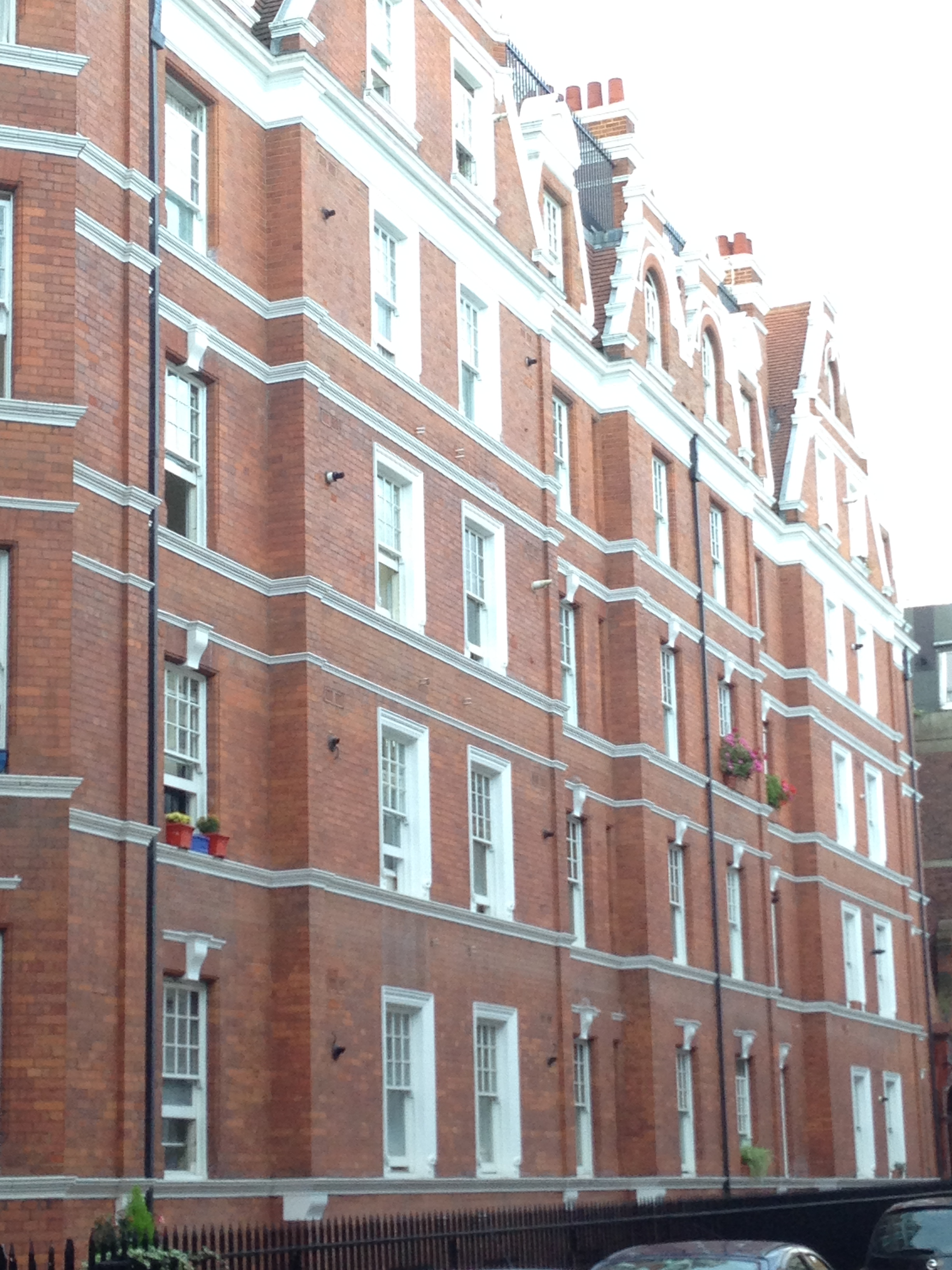
Crawford Buildings built by the Artizans’, Labourers’ & General Dwellings Company in 1893

Homer Street is a quiet one-way street in the Marylebone neighbourhood of the City of Westminster. It runs from Old Marylebone Road in the north to Crawford Street in the south. The street is part of the Marylebone Ward of Westminster City Council. Its postcode is W1H.

== History ==
The street is one of those in the Portman Estate area with classical names, such as Cato Street, Homer Row, and Virgil Place. According to Gillian Bebbington, these names were inspired by Edward Homer who was a friend of John Simon Harcourt, owner of the land on which the streets were built.

Most of the street is within the City of Westminster's Portman Estate Conservation Area.

On Charles Booth's 1898-99 poverty classification map of London, the street is shown in purple meaning ‘mixed, some comfortable others poor’. This is borne out by the late 19th century/early 20th century census returns which include houses of multiple occupation and residents living on ‘independent means' side by side in the same street. One of the town houses was even used as an orphanage by the Church Army.

== Buildings ==
The terrace of Georgian houses on the east side of Homer Street dates from 1808. Westminster Council describes numbers 6 and 7, 20, 33–37, and Crawford Buildings (nos. 21–67) as Unlisted Buildings of Merit.

Much of the street was demolished at the turn the 20th century to build the Edwardian mansion blocks Crawford Buildings and Cranfield Court.

Halfway along on the west side at number 8 is Octavia House, an unassuming modern building, which was completed as a retirement home for nurses in 1975. The building is named after the great social reformer Octavia Hill.

== Crawford Buildings and Cranfield Court ==
Crawford Buildings was constructed by the Artizans, Labourers & General Dwellings Company in 1893. It is one of five tenement blocks built by the company in the Marylebone area: Huntsworth Terrace (1877); East Street Buildings (now Wendover Court, Chiltern Street), (1890-2); Portman Buildings, Lisson Grove (1887); and Seymour Buildings, Seymour Place (1889). The main block of Seymour Buildings, situated between Homer Street and Seymour Place was demolished in 1980, but the shop-fronted buildings in Seymour Place survive.

Enid Elliott Linder lived at 67 Crawford Buildings from January 1933 to March 1939 and recalled the poverty and wealth of 1930s Marylebone in her memoir, We Learnt about Hitler at the Mickey Mouse Club, which was published posthumously in 2021.

Cranfield Court, on the opposite side of Homer Street, dates from 1901-2. It consists of five separate blocks which were originally called Clayton House (now number 1-10 Cranfield Court); Hudson House (11-20); Burgoyne House (21-30); Woburn House (31-40); and Cranfield House (41-50). Originally part of the Duke of Portland’s estate, the properties were sold at auction in 1952 with several other properties in Marylebone to help pay death duties.

== Freshwater Place ==
The intact ceramic archway between Octavia House and Crawford Buildings once led to Freshwater Place, a small terrace of houses tucked away between Homer Street and Homer Row. These buildings were acquired for Octavia Hill by leading Victorian art critic John Ruskin in 1866. The environment was described as 'a bit of desolate ground occupied by dilapidated cowsheds and manure heaps.' which Hill turned into a small playground for the tenants, where Ruskin planted some trees. This was Hill's second project in her ongoing efforts to replace slum dwellings with decent housing. Freshwater Place was demolished in 1961.

Elliot Linder recalled Freshwater Place of the 1930s:

'When [my sister] Joan and I wandered in through that deep archway for the first time, we found ourselves facing a broad rectangle of shaggy grass, like a village green. It was surrounded on three sides by old tumbledown two-storey cottages with small windows and very low doors. Cottagey flowers grew in pots on the windowsills, and the people who lived there seemed to be mainly late middle-aged or elderly.'

Freshwater Place took its name from a large well which was once overlooked by the houses. It measured 6 feet in diameter and had a depth of 145 feet. Water from this well once supplied the nearby Yorkshire Stingo brewery.

== Character ==
In its early days, Homer Street had shops and businesses on the ground floor of many buildings. Whilst some shop fronts have since disappeared, two of Marylebone's old pub buildings remain. The Olive Branch at the corner with Crawford Street is now Italian restaurant Bricioli, and halfway down the street, The Beehive is currently being renovated. The Beehive narrowly escaped demolition linked to St Marylebone Council's slum clearance programme in 1956, when the Freshwater Place/Homer Row scheme was cut back to exclude properties fronting Homer Street. The Olive Branch's 1988 reincarnation as The Quintin Hogg earned a wry put-down from Alan Coren in The Times Diary: 'Where will it end? Are we soon to have The Dog and Tebbit, or The Two Jolly Kinnocks?' Typically for the urban village it's part of, Homer Street is home to long-term residents and young professionals alike.
