= Yorkshire Stingo =

Former pub in Marylebone, London

Coordinates: 51.520520°N 0.164945°W

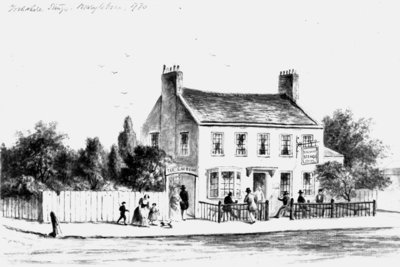
The Yorkshire Stingo, circa 1770

The Yorkshire Stingo was a public house in Marylebone, London in the 18th to mid-20th century. Its name derived from the custom for Yorkshiremen in London to gather at the pub and its adjoining pleasure gardens on the first three days of May each year. In May 1808 it was reported that over 20,000 people gathered there, drinking strong ale, and playing football and other 'rustic Yorkshire sports'. The Stingo part of its name comes from a fashionable 18th century slang word for strong or old ale. The term is possibly derived from the sharp, or "stinging" flavour of a well-matured beer.

The pub served as a significant landmark just outside Central London. Located on the south side of the Marylebone Road, it was a rural location when first built, before the construction of the New Road. A bowling green and pleasure gardens had been added in the 18th century. An admittance charge was made, redeemable with the waiters, as a method of preventing those with no money from enjoying the facilities.

In 1786 the Committee for the Relief of the Black Poor used the Stingo as one of the centres for distributing alms.

The pub had a connection with important developments in London's infrastructure and transport. When the Paddington branch of the Grand Union Canal opened in July 1801, a procession led by the Buckinghamshire Band walked from Paddington Basin to the Yorkshire Stingo for dinner and a convivial evening. In 1829 George Shillibeer operated London's first horse-drawn omnibus service from the Stingo to the Bank of England. His name is commemorated in the nearby Shillibeer Place.

In the 1830s the Yorkshire Stingo pleasure gardens attracted crowds of spectators to witness the ascent of hot air balloons, including balloonist Margaret Graham on 17 May 1837. Three months later, on 14 August, a balloon launched at the Stingo took part in a spectacle to have three hot air balloons visible in the skies above London at the same time. The other two balloons were launched from the Rosemary Branch, Hoxton (Margaret Graham) and the Vauxhall Gardens (Charles Green). The balloonist who took off from the Stingo was a Mr H Green, the brother of the Vauxhall balloonist. When the Stingo balloon had reached an altitude of 200 feet (61.0 m), Green dropped a cat in a basket attached to a small parachute which landed safely near Maida Hill.

The pub (together with Shore Street Music Hall and Hampstead Music Hall), was the earliest place to use the term "music hall" for vaudeville and burlesque. The music hall at The Stingo opened on 24 August 1835. The venue, later known as the Apollo Saloon, was situated behind the pub. In December of the following year, the audience narrowly escaped serious injury following a gas explosion on stage.

In 1847 the Health of Towns Commissioners located the vacant pleasure gardens and bowling site 'for erecting baths and washhouses for the labouring classes in Marylebone'. The public baths and washhouses opened in December 1849. The project cost £20,000 and at the time was the largest building of its kind in London. Its architect was Christopher Eales. The establishment contained 107 baths plus shower and vapour baths. There were also laundry facilities and two large swimming pools. All facilities were segregated for 'first and second class' users.

Stingo Lane was a narrow thoroughfare leading from Marylebone Road to Crawford Street. The small streets which led off it were described by Marylebone historian F H Hallam as ‘a great pest-hole of vice in every shape.’ The area was cleared in 1872, and the street renamed Seymour Place as it was a continuation of the existing Seymour Place. By 1875 a police court had been built on part of the site.

The Yorkshire Stingo Brewery occupied premises behind the pub. It originally obtained water for brewing from the deep well at Freshwater Place in nearby Homer Street. In 1909 the Brewery was acquired by the Church Army for £12,000, to be converted into workshops, a home for first-time offenders and a labour relief depot, as well as a chapel for religious services.

After the Second World War, the pub became a popular meeting place of London's top lawyers when London Sessions were temporarily held at the neighbouring Marylebone County Court while the Sessions in the city were being rebuilt due to war damage. The pub closed on 16 July 1964. Later that year the 150-year-old building was demolished to make way for road widening for the Marylebone Flyover.

There was once a toll bar near the Yorkshire Stingo. A grisly murder was reported there in 1808. The body of a passenger was discovered in a stage coach by the toll collector, said to have been 'weltering in his blood, with his head nearly severed from his body’.

== Thomas Paine's cast iron bridge ==
During 1790 the Yorkshire Stingo was the temporary home of the second cast iron bridge ever built. (The first was The Iron Bridge.) This was designed by Thomas Paine, better known as the author of the revolutionary 1791 best-seller Rights of Man. Paine had endeavoured to interest the authorities in Philadelphia and Paris in his design. He had gained a patent for this in 1788 and Walkers, who had an ironworks in Rotherham, agreed to construct it. Paine said of it that "Nothing in the world is as fine as my bridge, except a woman."

The original design of 250 feet (76.2 m) – to span the Schuylkill River, Philadelphia – had been scaled down to 90 feet (27.4 m). Paine discussed the bridge in correspondence with Thomas Jefferson, Sir Joseph Banks, George Washington and Sir George Staunton, and entertained hopes that it might be the model for an iron bridge across the Thames as well as the Seine. Paine supervised both the work at the Walker factory, and the erection of the bridge in the grounds of the Yorkshire Stingo. It weighed three tons and could bear a weight of six. Peter Whiteside, a Philadelphian merchant, was backing the project, but found himself in financial difficulties and asked Paine to return the money he had lent; in the end, the project had to be abandoned. Parts of it were then used in a bridge over the River Wear in Sunderland. William Yates, who had acted as Paine's foreman, went on to work on the Wear bridge and then Southwark Bridge, built by John Rennie. Paine later quipped that "the French Revolution, and Mr Burke's attacks upon it, drew me off any pontifical works".
