= John Simon Harcourt =

English politician (1772–1810)

John Simon Harcourt (14 December 1772 – 21 February 1810) of Ankerwycke, Buckinghamshire, was member of Parliament for Westbury 18 April 1800 - 1802.

In 1791, Harcourt bought the manor house (now known as St. Dunstan's) at Lisson village near Marylebone along with several acres of farm land for development. This land was parcelled out to his step-father Admiral Molyneux Lord Shuldham, Edward Homer of Marylebone and a Pentonville carpenter by the name of John Watson. The resulting streets were Harcourt Street, Molyneux Street, Shouldham Street, Homer Row, Homer Street and Watson's Mews.
