= George Shillibeer =

Inventor of the London Omnibus

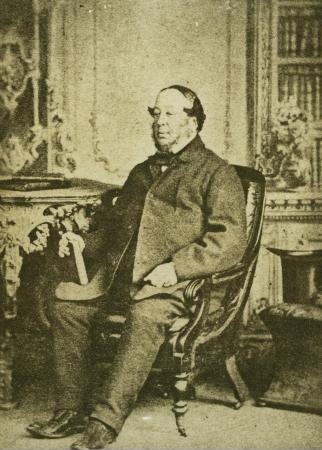
George Shillibeer, circa 1863

George Shillibeer (11 August 1797 – 21 August 1866) was an English coachbuilder.

== Biography ==
Shillibeer was born in Marylebone, London, the son of Abraham and Elizabeth Shillibeer, and was christened in St Mary's Church, Bryanston Square on 22 October 1797. Shillibeer worked for the coach company Hatchetts in Long Acre, the coach-building district of the capital. In the 1820s he was offered work in Paris, France, where he was commissioned to build some unusually large horse-drawn coaches of "novel design". The aim was to design a coach capable of transporting a whole group of people, perhaps two dozen, at a time.

Shillibeer's design worked, and was very stable. It was introduced into the streets of Paris in 1827. Shortly afterwards, Shillibeer was commissioned to build another by the Newington Academy for Girls, a Quaker school in Stoke Newington near London; this had a total of twenty-five seats, and entered history as the first school bus. In 1827 Joseph Pease, a railway pioneer and later the first Quaker MP, wrote in verse about the school bus:

The straight path of Truth the dear Girls keep their feet in,
And ah! it would do your heart good Cousin Anne,
To see them arriving at Gracechurch Street Meeting,
All snugly packed up, 25 in a van.

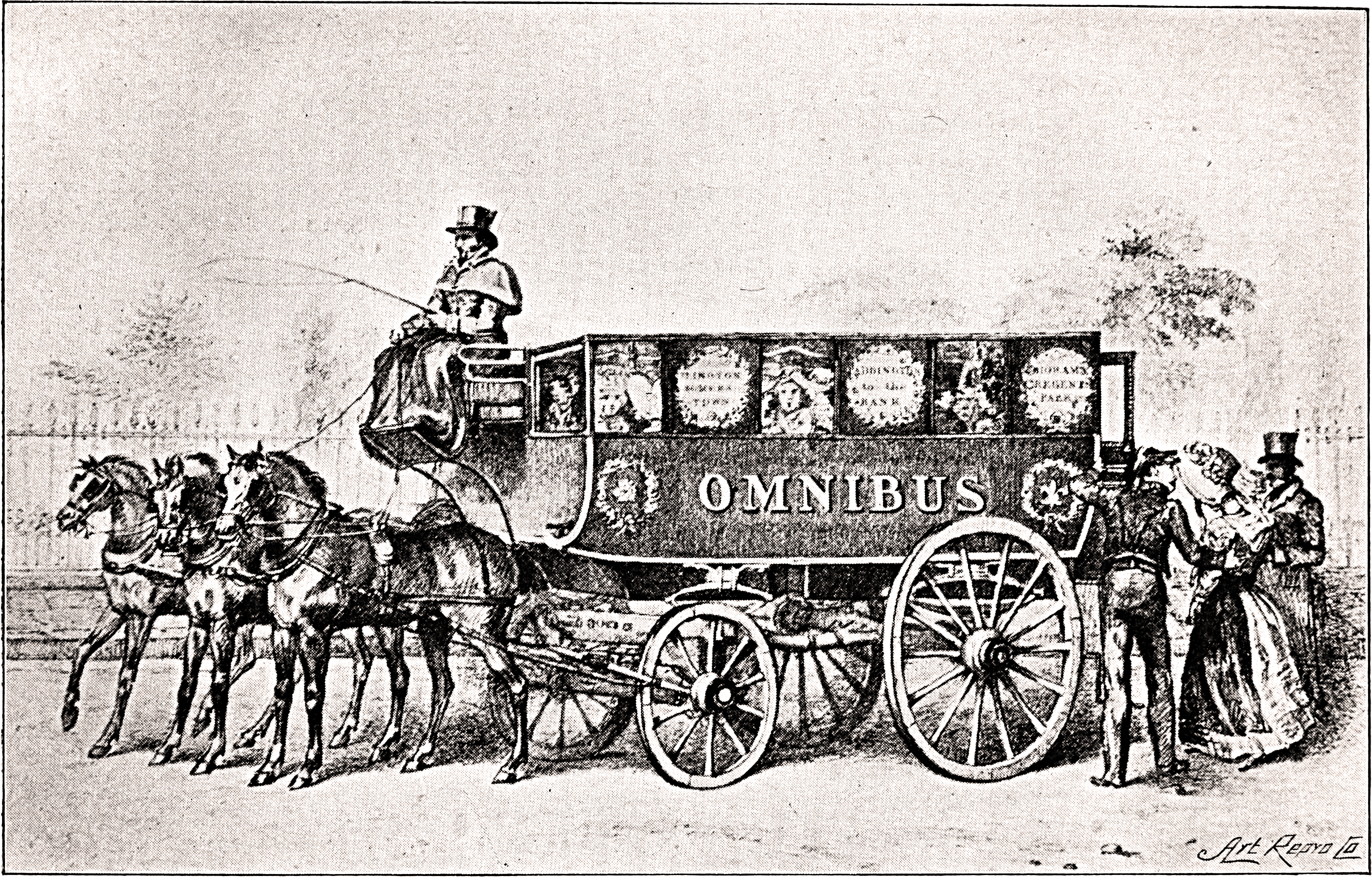
Shillibeer's first Omnibus

Whilst in Paris, Shillibeer concluded that operating similar vehicles in London, but for the fare-paying public with multiple stops, would be a paying enterprise, so he returned to his native city. His first London "omnibus" took up service on 4 July 1829 on the route between Paddington (The Yorkshire Stingo) and "Bank" (Bank of England) via the "New Road" (now Marylebone Rd), Somers Town and City Rd. Four services were provided in each direction daily. This service was described in the first advertisements as being "upon the Parisian mode" and that "a person of great respectability attended his vehicle as Conductor". An account of the new service was given in the Morning Post of 7 July 1829:

Saturday the new vehicle, called the Omnibus, commenced running from Paddington to the City, and excited considerable notice, both from the novel form of the carriage, and the elegance with which it is fitted out. It is capable of accommodating 16 or 18 persons, all inside, and we apprehend it would be almost impossible to make it overturn, owing to the great width of the carriage. It was drawn by three beautiful bays abreast, after the French fashion. The Omnibus is a handsome machine, in the shape of a van. The width the horses occupy will render the vehicle rather inconvenient to be turned or driven through some of the streets of London.

A less successful innovation was his "Funeral Omnibus", which combined a passenger vehicle with a hearse.

George Shillibeer died at Brighton, East Sussex on 21 August 1866 (some sources say 22 August), and is buried in the graveyard at St Mary's Church at Chigwell in Essex.

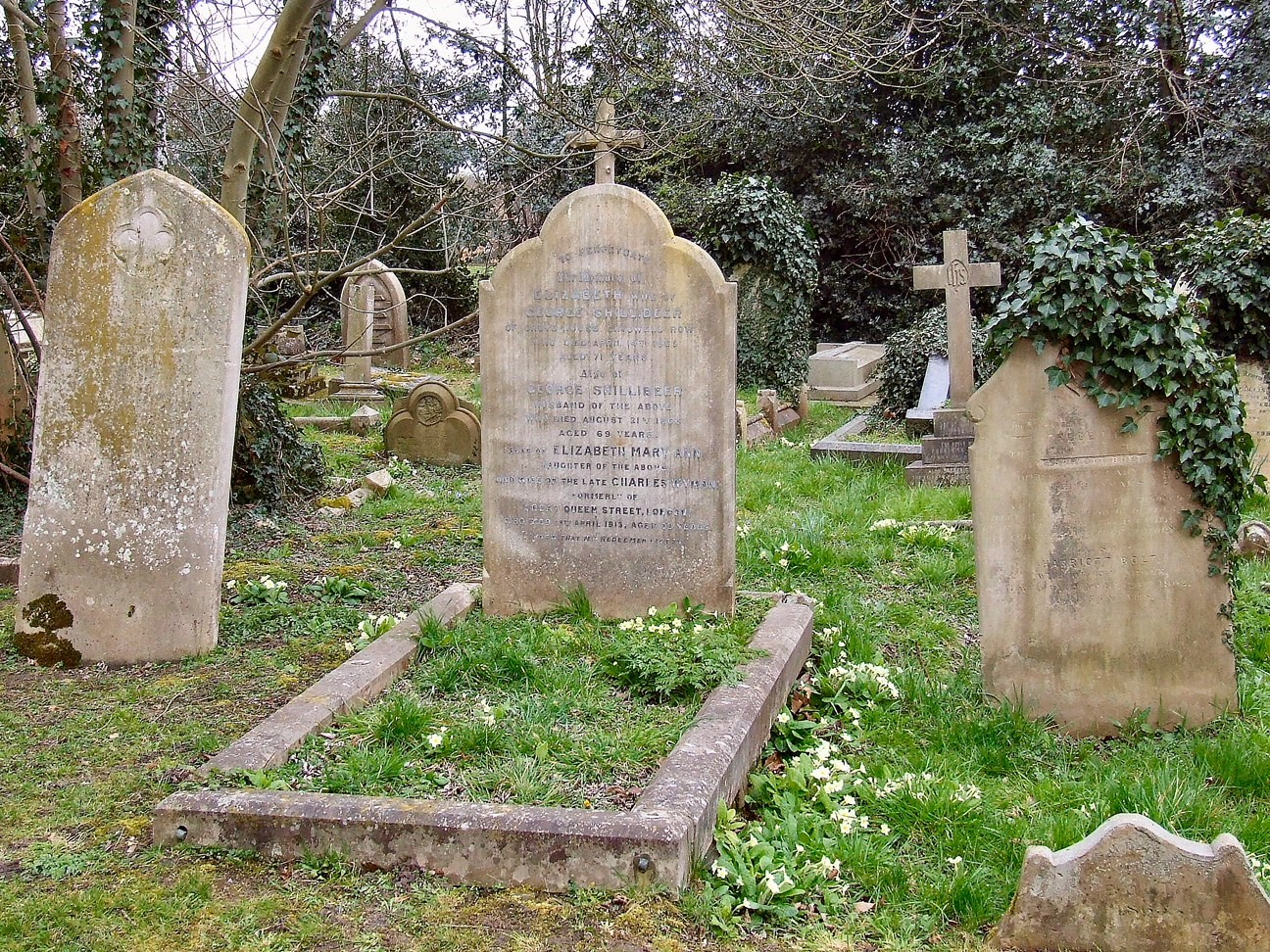
The grave of George Shillibeer in St Mary's churchyard, Chigwell, Essex.

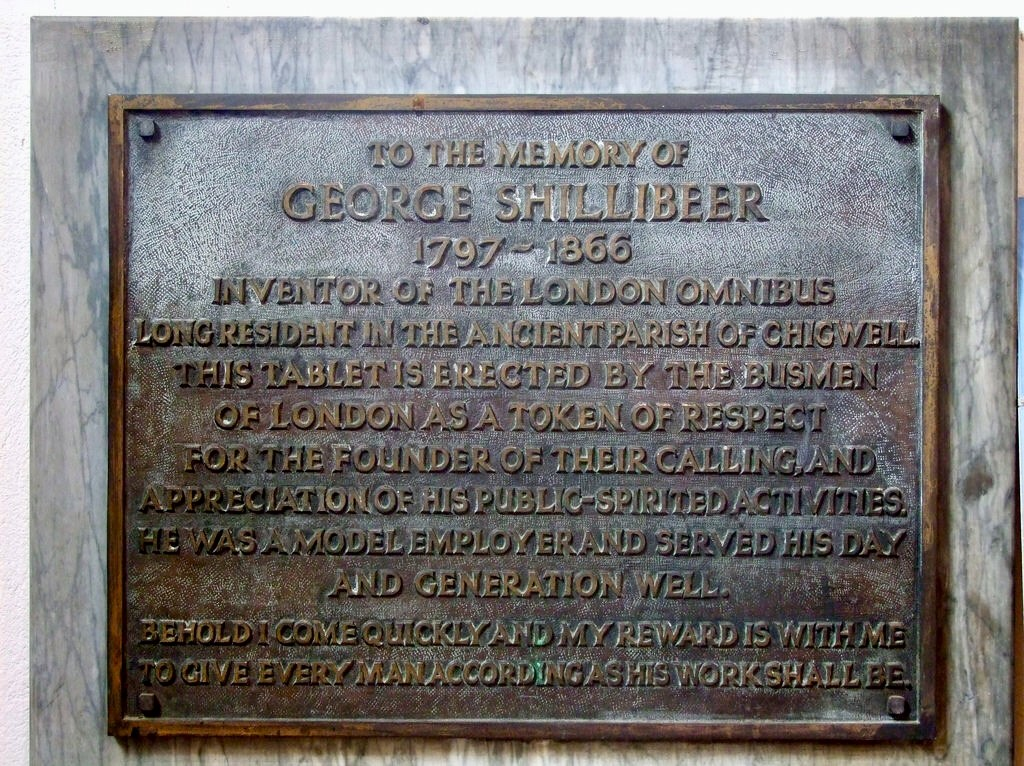
The memorial to George Shillibeer in St Mary's Church, Chigwell, Essex.

In 1979, the 150th anniversary of the commencement of the first omnibus service in London, several London buses (twelve AEC Routemasters and one Leyland Fleetline) were operated in a green and yellow livery similar to Shillibeer's Omnibus. These specially painted vehicles were displayed for their launch into service at the Guildhall in central London on Friday 2 March 1979. Poet laureate Sir John Betjeman was one of the guests at the ceremony. Also, a memorial service was held at the Chigwell Church attended by Queen Elizabeth, the Queen Mother.

Shillibeer Walk in Chigwell was named after him, and Shillibeer Place in Marylebone, as is a pub/restaurant named The George Shillibeer next to a converted omnibus factory in north London.

BBC Coast presenter Nicholas Crane, is a direct descendant.

== See also ==
- Horse-drawn omnibus
- Horse-drawn vehicle
