= The Duke of Wellington, Marylebone =

Pub in Marylebone, London

The Duke of Wellington
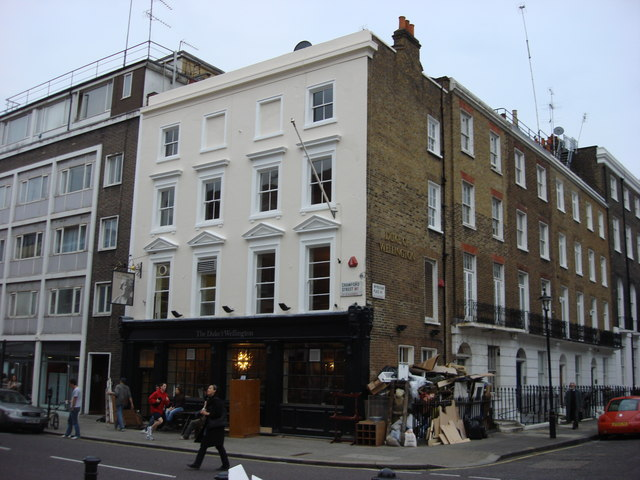
- The Duke of Wellington in 2007
- Type: Public house
- Location: 94a Crawford Street, London
- Coordinates: 51°31′9.66″N 0°9′41.22″W

Listed Building – Grade II
- Official name: DUKE OF WELLINGTON PUBLIC HOUSE
- Designated: 01-Dec-1987
- Reference no.: 1221008

The Duke of Wellington is a grade II listed public house at 94a Crawford Street, London.
