= Homer Row =

Street in Westminster, London, England

Coordinates: 51°31′8.68″N 0°9′54.97″W

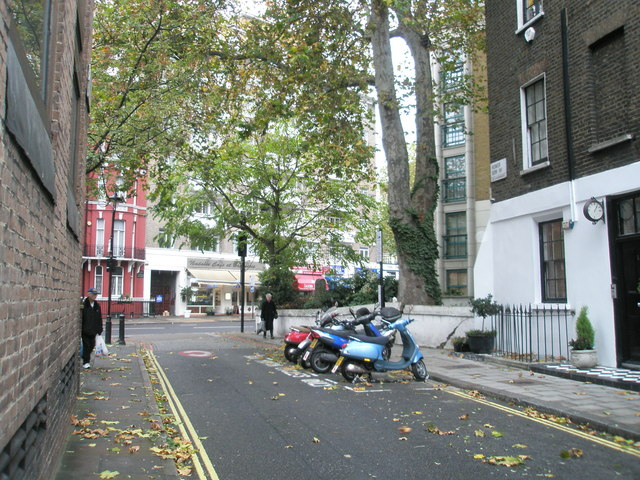
Junction of Homer Row and Old Marylebone Road in the west.

Homer Row is a street in the Marylebone district of the City of Westminster, London, that runs from Old Marylebone Road in the north to the junction of Crawford Place and Crawford Street in the south.

The street is one of those in the Portman Estate area with classical names, such as Cato Street, Homer Street, and Virgil Place. According to Gillian Bebbington, all four street names were inspired by Edward Homer who was a friend of John Simon Harcourt who owned the land on which the streets were built.

== Buildings ==
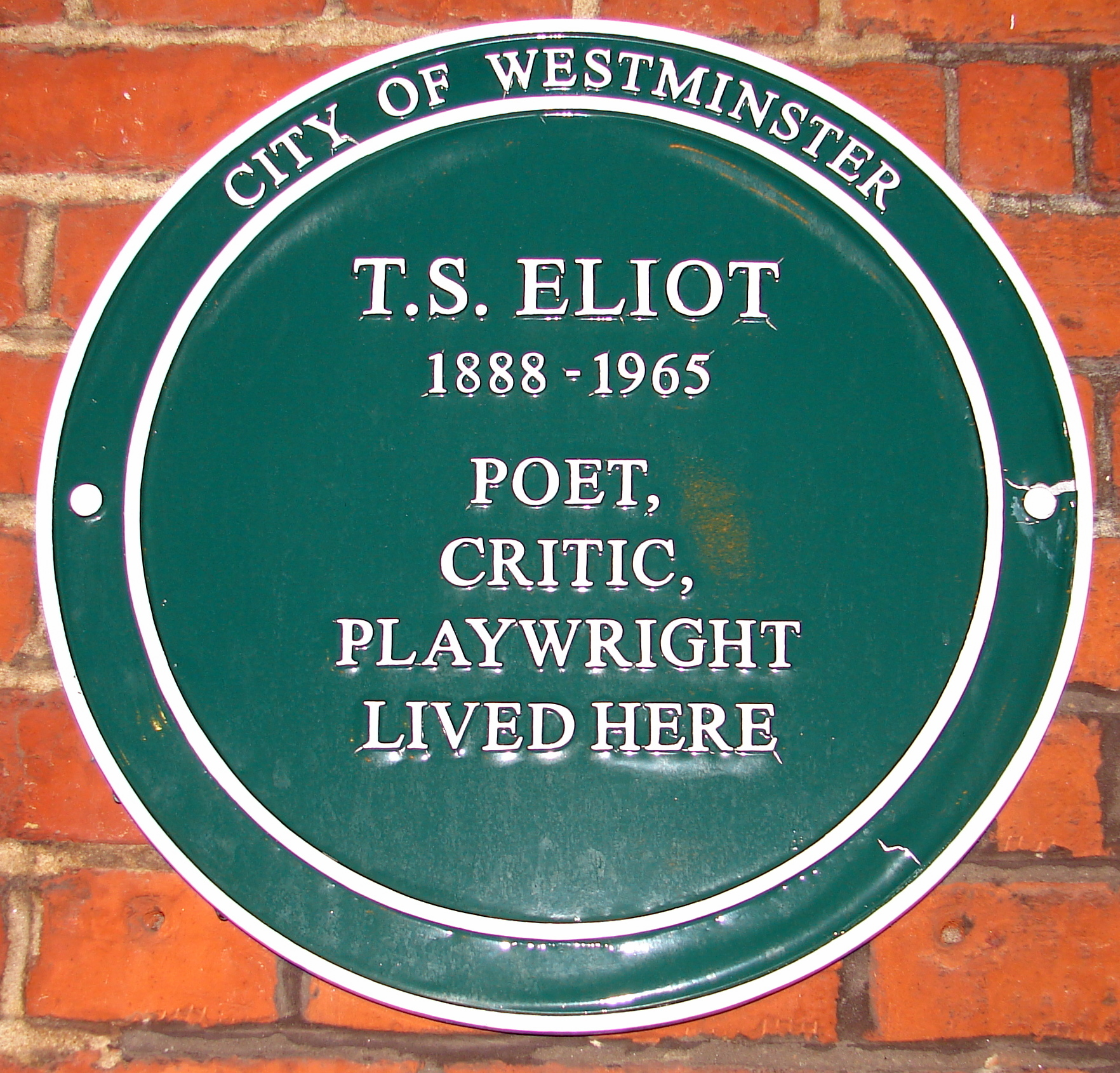
The plaque to T.S. Eliot on the Homer Row side of Crawford Mansions.

No. 1 Homer Row (207 Old Marylebone Road) is a grade II listed building with Historic England.

Crawford Mansions, where the poet T.S. Eliot once lived, is located on the eastern side of the street on the corner with Crawford Street. A green plaque next to the Homer Row entrance to the building notes Eliot's former home. He lived at number 18 with his wife Vivienne from 1916 to 1918. During this time, Eliot was working as a teacher at Highgate School where he taught future Poet Laureate John Betjeman.

The western side of the street is wholly taken up by Abrar House, the home on the second floor of the High Commission for Antigua & Barbuda in London.

The third floor of Abrar House is the High Commission of Belize in London.
