= Committee for the Relief of the Black Poor =

Charitable organization founded in London

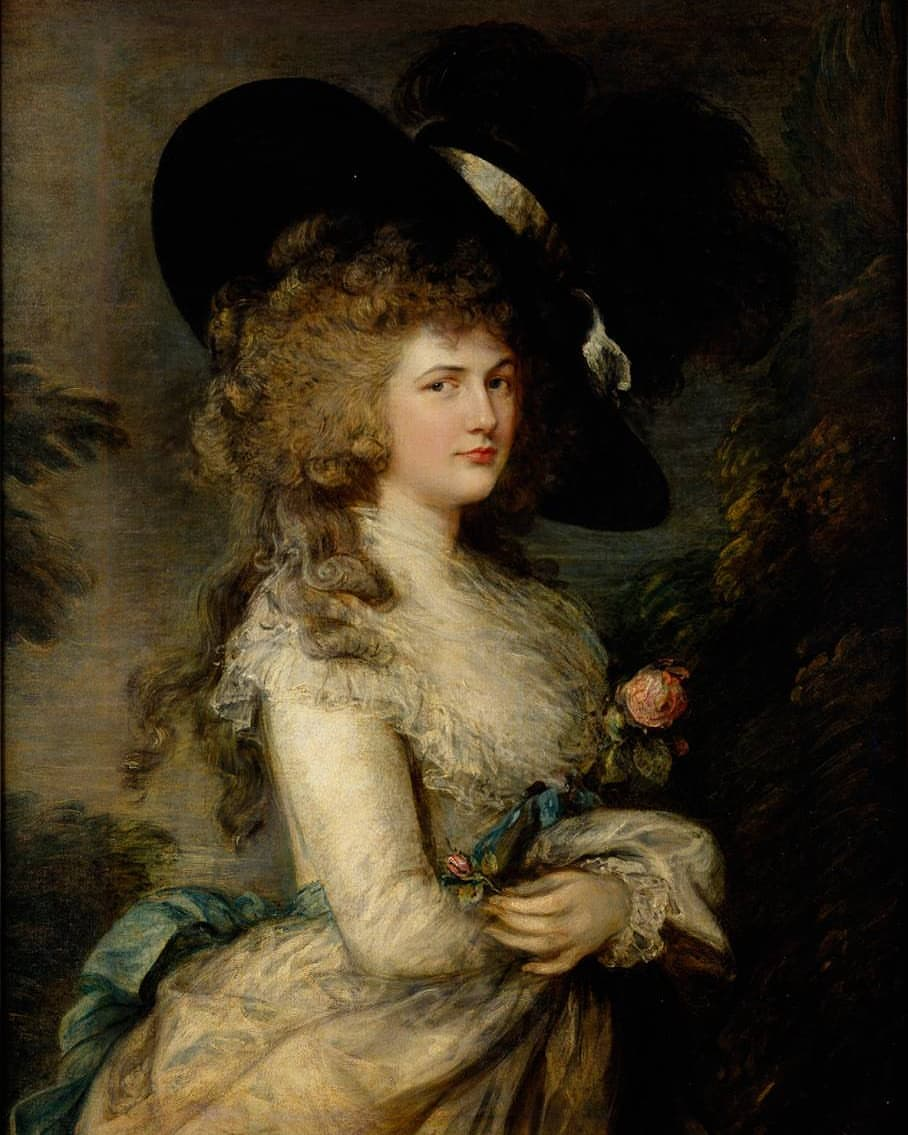
A portrait of Georgiana Cavendish by Thomas Gainsborough. Cavendish was a prominent member of the committee.

The Committee for the Relief of the Black Poor was a charitable organisation founded in London in 1786 to provide sustenance for distressed people of African and Asian origin. It played a crucial role in the proposal to form a colony for Black people in Sierra Leone. The work of the Committee overlapped to some extent with the campaign to abolish slavery throughout the British Empire.

== The Black Poor in 18th-century Britain ==
The "Black Poor" was the collective name given in the 18th century to indigent residents of the capital who were of black descent. The Black Poor had diverse origins. The core of the community were people who had been brought to London as a result of the Atlantic slave trade, sometimes as slaves or indentured servants who had served on slave ships. The numbers of the Black Poor were increased by slaves who ran away from their owners, and found refuge in the London communities.

From as early as 1596, Queen Elizabeth I complained about the presence of "blackamoores" in London, ordering a decree for them to be expelled - though whether this happened is unclear. The Black Poor had become a rare but noticeable sight on the streets of London. Most of the Black Poor lived in impoverished East End parishes, such as Mile End; or in Seven Dials, near Covent Garden Market; and in the more prosperous Marylebone. A community took root in Paddington in West London.

The Black Poor formed a portion of the broader Black British community predominantly employed in menial urban jobs like the vast majority of the working London population, but had prominent members such as tradesman Ignatius Sancho and writer Olaudah Equiano. In 1731 the Corporation of London barred "Negroes or other Blacks" from apprenticeships with any freeman of a livery company (an institution somewhere between a medieval guild and a trade union), thereby limiting opportunities for advancement in skilled trades. At the time, black sailors served on both Royal Navy and merchant ships.

Pro-slavery advocates accused the Black Poor of being responsible for a large proportion of crime. Slave owner Edward Long criticised marriage between black men and white women.

The numbers of Black Poor in London increased significantly in the aftermath of the American War of Independence, which occurred between 1776-1783. Lord Dunmore's Proclamation resulted in several thousand black slaves running away from the estates of Patriots, and they fought on the side of the British. At the conclusion of the war, the British transported many of these Black Loyalist soldiers to Nova Scotia, but a lot of them found their way to London. Historians estimate that Black Pioneers made up about half of the Black Londoners.

In 1786, hundreds of Black Poor were receiving poor assistance.

== Relief efforts ==
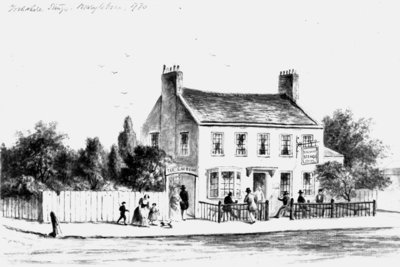
The Yorkshire Stingo, a public house in Marylebone. The committee used this pub as a distribution outlet for alms to the Black Poor.

On 5 January 1786, an announcement appeared in the Public Advertiser that Mr. Brown, a baker in Wigmore Street, Cavendish Square, was to "give a Quartern Loaf to every Black in Distress, who will apply on Saturday next between the Hours of Twelve and Two". Details followed that enabled black citizens to subscribe. A meeting was organised for 10 January and by the end of the month, a group had summarised the situation. Originally concern was expressed about Lascars, Asian seamen. But, the group found that there were about 250 "Blacks in Distress," of whom only 35 came from the East Indies, the others being from Africa or the West Indies. One hundred men said they had been in the Royal Navy. In common with other responses to serious social problems, the issue was addressed by concerned citizens who set up appeals and fund-raising lists, e.g. there was also a subscription list to support distressed weavers in Spitalfields.

After the original meeting, held in the premises of Mr Faulder, a bookseller of Bond Street, subsequent meetings were held in Batson's Coffee House, opposite the Royal Exchange. The effort attracted some prominent figures from London's financial elite: George Peters, Governor of the Bank of England, Thomas Boddington, the noted philanthropist and slave owner, John Julius Angerstein, General Robert Melville. Montagu Burgoyne was the original chair person, but after a few weeks his business interests took him away from London and he was replaced by Benjamin Johnson, who in turn suffered ill-health and was replaced by Jonas Hanway. The abolitionists Samuel Hoare and two of the three Thornton brothers, Henry and Samuel, were also involved, along with James Pettit Andrews and Sir Joseph Andrews.

On 14 February The Morning Herald remarked:

The example of the Duchess of Devonshire, in contributing to the relief of the poor Blacks, has had a salutary effect. The Countess of Salisbury, the Countess of Essex, Marchioness of Buckingham and a variety of other titled characters are also on the charitable list.

When the appeal was closed on 18 April, a total of £890 1s had been raised. Donors included many bishops and clergy, including Herbert Mayo and William Pitt. Aside from general benevolence, this cause attracted particular sympathy because so many were Black Loyalists who had served in the British Armed Forces and been resettled in London after the British defeat in the American War of Independence. The largest donation was collected from among the Quakers by Samuel Hoare.

The Committee soon organised two venues for regular distribution of alms: the White Raven tavern in Mile End and the Yorkshire Stingo, in Lisson Grove, Marylebone. These venues were open for several hours a day providing outdoor relief. There was also a sick house set up in Warren Street, where 40-50 men needing medical attention were provided for with indoor relief. Some of the recipients of aid were found jobs, particularly as seamen. In providing clothes so that men could get work as sailors, some of the committee members were simply applying the same charitable methods they had used in organisations such as the Marine Society. But, the shortage of work at sea meant that unemployment remained a problem. Surplus labour was drifting in from the countryside, and many English people also took up begging in London. Lacking the resources to set up any new industry, the Committee took heed of such individuals as Richard Weaver who was "willing and desirous to go to Halifax and other Parts of Nova Scotia where there is a fairer Prospect of Employment" (see Black Nova Scotians). Soon the charity focused its goals on giving "a temporary relief to the objects of the Charity, and in future to provide them with clothes and a settlement abroad" . . . "to such places as may put them in a condition of getting their bread in freedom and comfort".

== Migration to Sierra Leone ==
The committee also was instrumental in the transfer of Black Poor to the newly-established colony of Sierra Leone. Many in London thought that moving them to Sierra Leone would lift them out of poverty. The Sierra Leone Resettlement Scheme was proposed by entomologist Henry Smeathman and drew interest from humanitarians like Granville Sharp saw it as a means of showing the pro-slavery lobby that black people could contribute towards the running of the new colony of Sierra Leone. Government officials soon became involved in the scheme as well, although their interest was spurred by the possibility of resettling a large group of poor citizens elsewhere. William Pitt the Younger, prime minister and leader of the Tory party, had an active interest in the Scheme, because he saw it as a means to repatriate the Black Poor to Africa, since "it was necessary they should be sent somewhere, and be no longer suffered to infest the streets of London".

By the end of October 1786, transport ships were commissioned and docked at Deptford. The applicants for the settlement were to sign an agreement, agreeing to the condition that they would retain the status of British subjects, and were to be defended by the British Armed Forces. They were then given a document granting the citizenship of Sierra Leone.

However, even though the Committee signed up about 700 members of the Black Poor, only 441 boarded the three ships that set sail from London to Portsmouth. The authorities, with the support of the Committee, sought to force beggars from the streets of London to join the program, in order to make up for the hundreds who refrained from boarding. Many black Londoners were no longer interested in the scheme, and the coercion employed by the committee and the government to recruit them only reinforced their opposition. Equiano, who was originally involved in the scheme, became one of its most vocal critics. Another prominent black Londoner, Ottobah Cugoano, also criticised the scheme. Lord George Gordon, who had a lot of influence with the Black Poor of London, also advised many of them not to go.

In January 1787, Atlantic and Belisarius set sail for Sierra Leone, but bad weather forced them to divert to Plymouth, during which time about 50 passengers died. Another 24 were discharged, and 23 ran away. Eventually, with some more recruitment, 411 passengers sailed to Sierra Leone in April 1787. On the voyage between Plymouth and Sierra Leone, 96 passengers died en route.

== The first settlement in Sierra Leone ==
The ones that managed to survive the voyage arrived on the shore of Sierra Leone on 15 May 1787, and established a town they called Granville Town. When the ships left them in September, their numbers had been reduced to “to 276 persons, namely 212 black men, 30 black women, 5 white men and 29 white women.”

The settlers that remained forcibly captured land from a local African chieftain, but he retaliated, attacking the settlement, which was reduced to a mere 64 settlers comprising 39 black men, 19 black women, and six white women. Black settlers were captured by unscrupulous traders and sold as slaves, and the remaining colonists were forced to arm themselves for their own protection.

Eventually, the organisers of the Sierra Leone Resettlement Scheme turned to Nova Scotia, and recruited Black Pioneers there to repopulate the colony. John Clarkson, who led that new settlement drive, initially banned the survivors of Granville Town from joining the new settlement, blaming them for the demise of Granville Town.

In 1792, in a move that pre-figured the women's suffrage movements in Britain, the heads of all households, of which a third were women, were given the right to vote.

== Aftermath ==
Today the descendants of the Black Poor form part of the Sierra Leone Creole people.
