= Crawford Place =

Street in Marylebone, London

Coordinates: 51.5183°N 0.1656°W

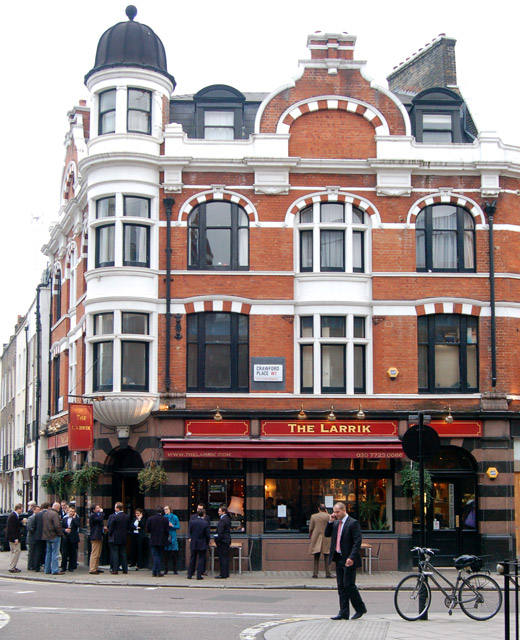
The Larrick public house, Crawford Place.

Crawford Place is a street in the Marylebone district of the City of Westminster, London. The street was developed in the first decade of the 1800s and was original known as John Street West.

== Location ==
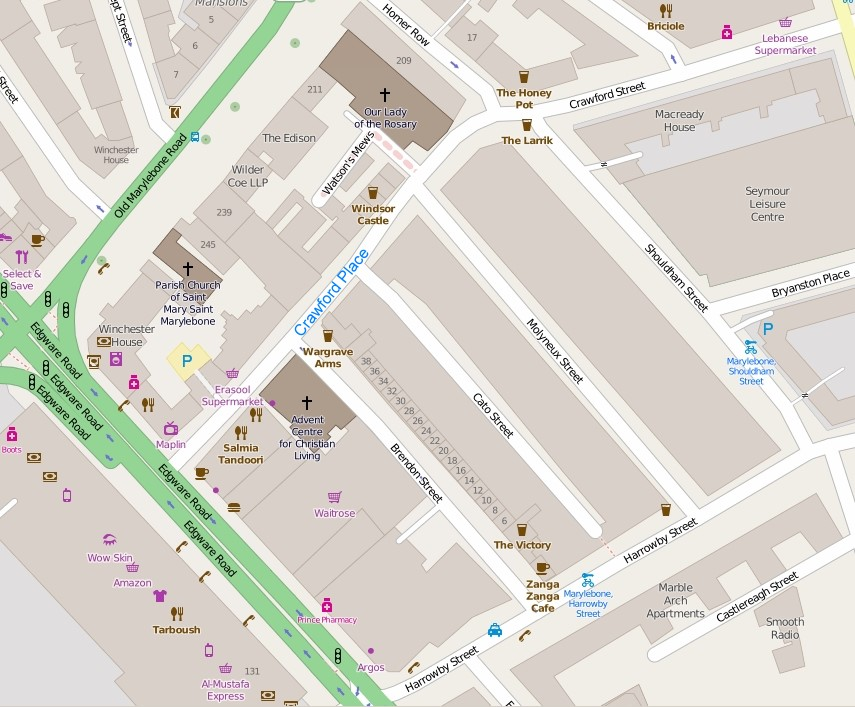
The immediate vicinity of Crawford Place (centre).

The street runs from Edgware Road in the west to the junction of Homer Row, Shouldham Street, and Crawford Street in the east. Brendon Street, Cato Street, and Molyneux Street run south from Crawford Place. Watson's Mews is off the north side of Crawford Place.

== History ==
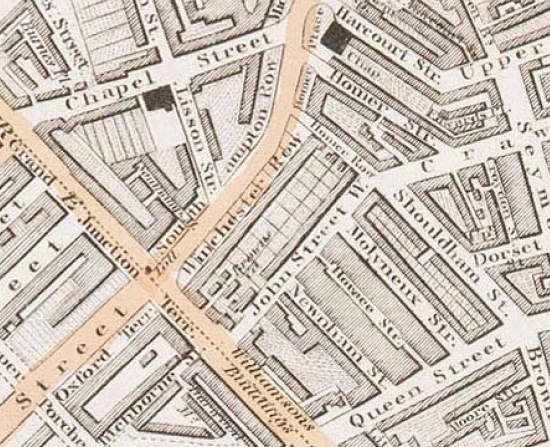
Crawford Place shown as John Street West on Greenwood's map of 1830.

The street and the adjacent streets to the east of Edgware Road were laid out in the first decade of the 1800s as an area of "fourth rate" terraced housing. Greenwood's map of 1830 shows it marked as John Street West. It is now known as Crawford Place and there are several streets in the area named after Tarrant Crawford, a property in Dorset owned by the Portman family who owned much of the land in Marylebone.

The street is mostly within the City of Westminster's Molyneux Street Conservation Area.

== Buildings ==
On the north side of the street, Abrar House, on the corner with Homer Row, is the home on the second floor of the High Commission for Antigua & Barbuda in London. The third floor of Abrar House is the High Commission of Belize in London. Also on the north side are, from east to west, the rear of the Roman Catholic Church of Our Lady of the Rosary, Marylebone, the Windsor Castle public house, The Christian Union Alms-Houses (rebuilt 1899), and the Crawford Place mansion block at No. 11.

On the south side of the street are The Larrick public house on the corner with Shouldham Street, the modernist Elliott House (1939) between Molyneux Street and Cato Street, the Lord Wargrave public house on the corner with Brendon Street, and the Central London Seventh-Day Adventist Church at the eastern end of the street.

The Windsor Castle and The Larrick public houses are not listed buildings with Historic England but are designated buildings of merit within the Molyneux Street conservation area.

The remainder of the street is a mix of terraced houses, small shops and modern buildings.
