= The Beehive, Marylebone =

Public house in Marylebone, London

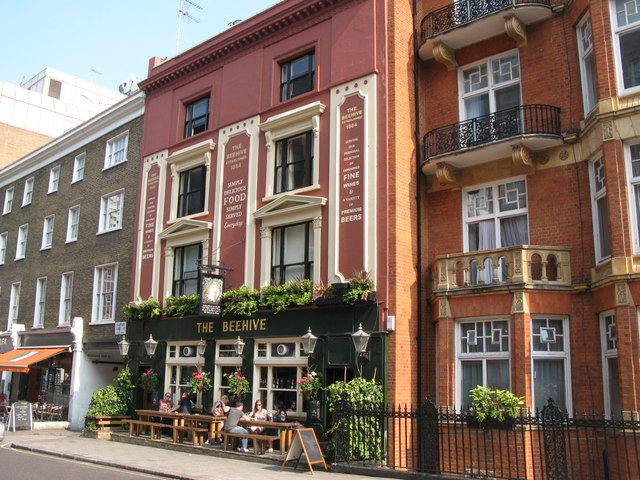
- The Beehive pub at 126 Crawford Street

- Location within Central London
- 51°31′12″N 0°09′26″W
- Type: Public house
- Location: Marylebone
- OS grid reference: TQ 27944 81734

History
- Built: c. 1793
- Rebuilt: 1884

Site notes
- Area: City of Westminster

Listed Building – Grade II
- Official name: The Beehive public house
- Designated: 1 December 1987
- Reference no.: 1221026

The Beehive is a Grade II listed public house at 126 Crawford Street, London.

It was first licensed in 1793 before being rebuilt in 1884. The contemporary pub has a floorspace of 1,700 sq ft.
