= Horse-drawn omnibus =

Horse-drawn passenger transport vehicle

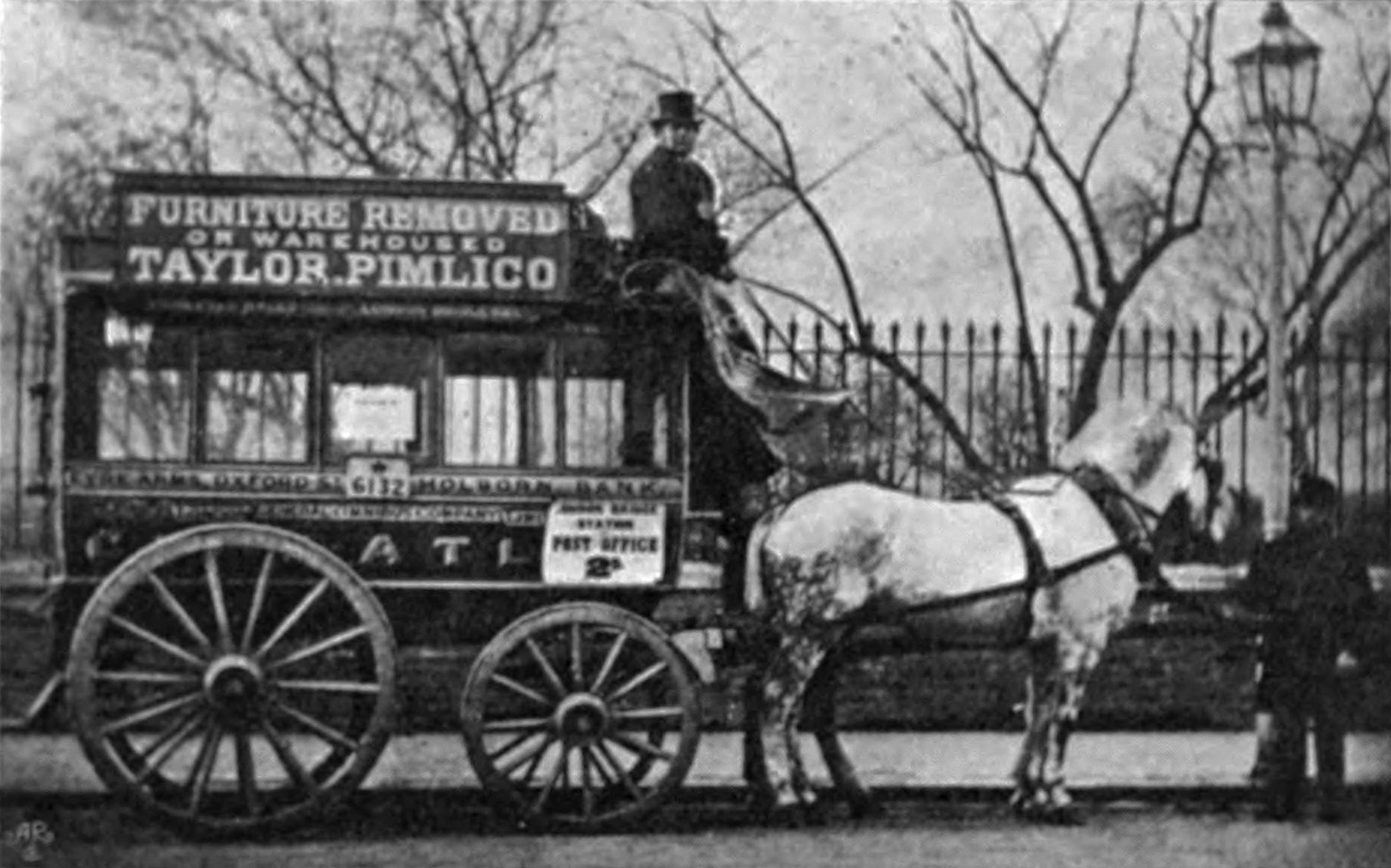
Horse-drawn omnibus in London, 1902

A horse-drawn omnibus is a large enclosed horse-drawn vehicle, used for passenger transport before the rise of motor vehicles. They were widely used in the 19th century in Europe, North America, and other nations where horse-drawn transport was used, and was a common means of urban public transportation. In a typical arrangement, two wooden benches along the sides of the passenger cabin held sitting passengers facing each other. The driver sat on an elevated seat outside in front. Some omnibuses were double-deckers with an open upper deck.

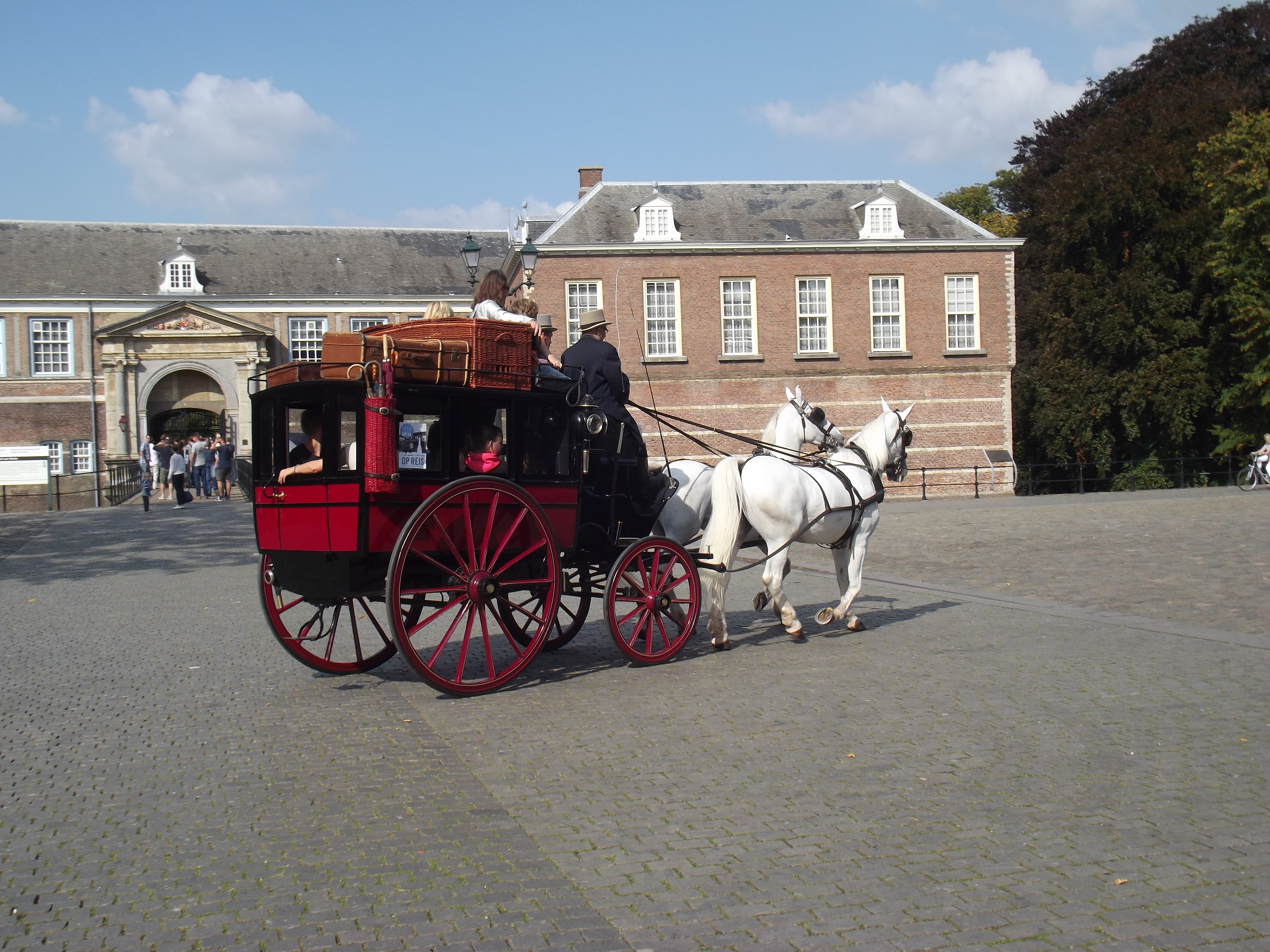
A private omnibus or "station bus"

Smaller omnibuses were often maintained at country houses, hotels and railway stations to convey people and luggage to and from railway stations. Especially popular around 1870–1900, these vehicles were known as 'private omnibuses' or 'station buses'. Driven by coachmen, they can accommodate four to six passengers inside, with room for luggage, and sometimes additional seating on the roof.

== Etymology ==
According to the Museum of Urban, Interurban and Rural Transport, the name "omnibus" comes from a shop located in front of the first carriage transport service opened in Nantes, France by Stanislas Baudry in 1823. A hatter named Omnès had named his shop "Omnès Omnibus"—a pun on the Latin omnes omnibus, meaning "for all". The phrase was adopted for Baudry's new public carriage service, and the vehicle itself soon became known as an omnibus. The legend concludes, Nantes citizens gave the nickname "omnibus" to the vehicle.

Though it is undisputed that the term arose with Stanislas Baudry's company, there is no record of any Omnès hatter living in that street. In 1892, the son of Baudry's bookkeeper wrote in the Bulletin de la Société archéologique de Nantes that omnibus had a simpler origin. Baudry used to call his horsecars Dames blanches (White ladies), a name which, critics told him, made no sense. He then replied, with the Latin word: "Then, these are omnibus cars!" (cars for all). The name caught on immediately. Other stories about the name origin quickly spread out.

== History ==
The first known public transport service was the carrosses à cinq sols service launched by Blaise Pascal in 1662 in Paris. It was quite popular until fares were increased and access to the service for commoners was restricted. Services ceased after 15 years.

John Greenwood opened the first omnibus line in Britain in Manchester in 1824. His pioneering idea was to offer a service where, unlike with a stagecoach, no prior booking was necessary and the driver would pick up or set down passengers anywhere on request. The first omnibus was introduced in London in 1831, and in 1838 legislation was passed to regulate them, requiring the drivers and conductors to obtain a license and wear a badge with the licence number on it.

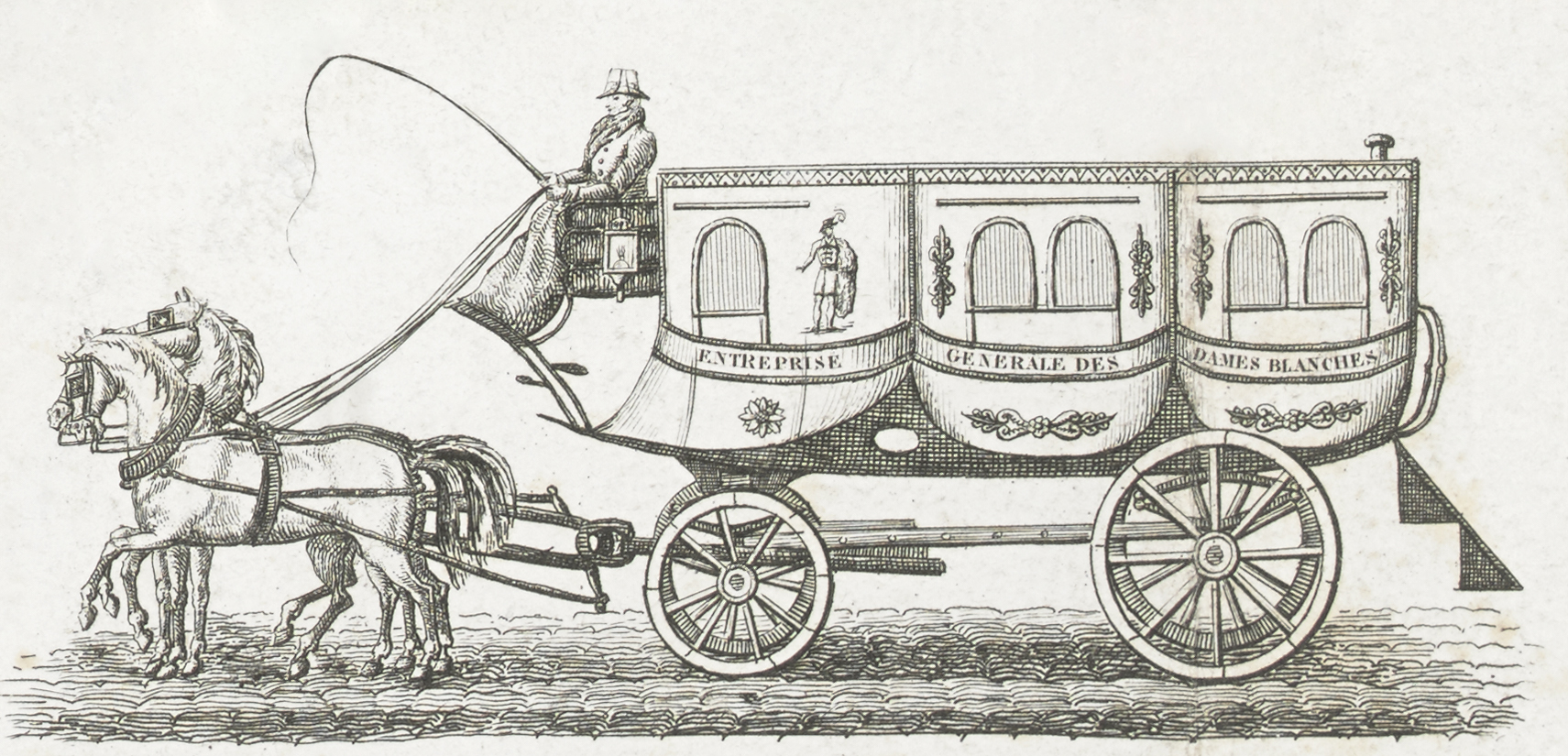
A Paris omnibus in 1828

The Paris omnibus was started in 1828 by a businessman named Stanislas Baudry, who had begun the first French omnibus line in Nantes in 1825. Following success in Nantes, Baudry moved to Paris and founded the Enterprise des Omnibus on rue de Lancre, with workshops on the quai de Jemmapes. In 1827 he commissioned an English coachbuilder, George Shillibeer, to design a vehicle that could be stable while carrying a large number of passengers. Shillibeer's design worked. On 28 April 1828, the first Paris omnibus began service, running every fifteen minutes between La Madeleine and the Bastille. Before long, there were one hundred omnibuses in service, with eighteen different itineraries. A journey cost twenty-five centimes. The omnibuses circulated between seven in the morning and seven in the evening; each omnibus could carry between twelve and eighteen passengers. The busiest line was that along the Grand Boulevards; it ran from eight in the morning until midnight.

The Paris omnibus service was an immediate popular success, with more than two and a half million passengers in the first six months. There was no reliable way to collect money from the passengers, or the fare collectors kept much of the money for themselves. In its first years the company was continually on the verge of bankruptcy and, in despair, Baudry committed suicide in February 1830. Baudry's partners reorganized the company and managed to keep it in business.

In September 1828, a competing company, les Dames-Blanches, had started running its own vehicles. In 1829 and the following years, more companies with poetic names entered the business; les Citadines, les Tricycles, les Orléanises, les Diligentes, les Écossaises, les Béarnaises, les Carolines, les Batignollaises, les Parisiennes, les Hirondelles, les Joséphines, les Excellentes, les Sylphides, les Constantines, les Dames-Françaises, les Algériennes, les Dames-Réunies, and les Gazelles. The omnibus had a profound effect on Parisian life, making it possible for Parisians to work and have a social life outside their own neighborhoods.

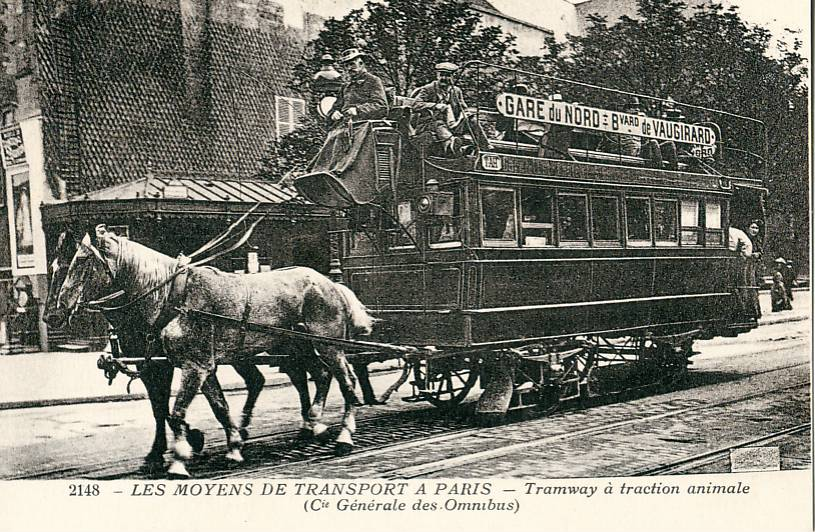
An omnibus of the Compagnie générale des omnibus company

By 1845, 13 companies in Paris operated 20 or 23 omnibus lines. In 1855, Napoleon III had them combined into a single company, the Compagnie générale des omnibus, with a monopoly on Paris public transportation. Beginning in 1873, they were gradually replaced by tramways, and, beginning in 1906, by the omnibus automobile, or motor bus. The last horse-drawn Paris omnibus ran on 11 January 1913, from Saint-Sulpice to La Villette.

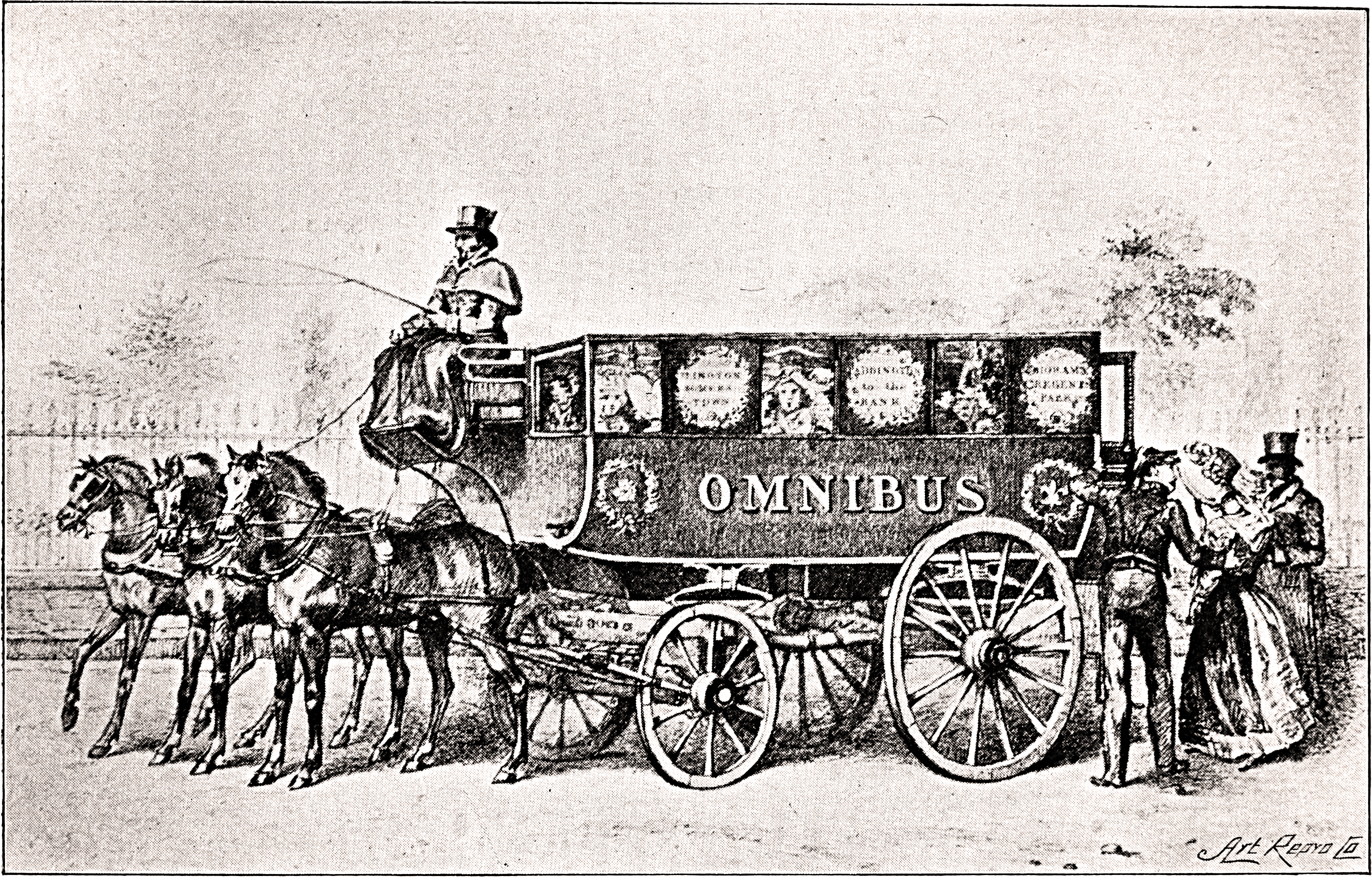
George Shillibeer's first London omnibus, 1829

Horse-drawn omnibuses were used on the streets of London from 1829. George Shillibeer saw the success of the Paris omnibus in service, and concluded that similar vehicles in London would be commercially successful. His first London omnibus, using the same design and name as the Paris vehicle, took up service on 4 July 1829 on the route between Paddington, the Yorkshire Stingo, and the Bank via the New Road (now Marylebone Road), Somers Town and City Road. There were four services daily in each direction. Shillibeer's success prompted many competitors to enter the market, and for a time omnibuses were referred to as "Shillibeers". Shillibeer built another omnibus for the Quaker Newington Academy for Girls near London; this had a total of 25 seats, and entered history as the first school bus. On London omnibuses, the introduction of the clerestory roof in 1847, to provide more headroom inside, allowed the provision of a longitudinal seat on the upper deck. As with stagecoaches, outside fares were cheaper than travelling inside.

The British writer Leigh Hunt wrote an essay called "The inside of an Omnibus" that appeared in book form in a collection of his essays in 1847. In it, he commented on what a revolution the omnibus was in public transport. Previously, only the wealthy could afford to own or rent a coach and enjoy the convenience and comfort it provided.

By the invention of the omnibus, all the world keeps its coach! - And what cheapness! And to how much social advantage! … no expenses for liveries; no coachmakers and horse-doctors bills ... If a morning omnibus, it is full of clerks and merchants; if a noon, of chance fares; if a night, of returning citizens and fathers of families; if a midnight, of playgoers, and gentlemen lax with stiff glasses of brandy-and-water.

British law restricted the number of passengers who could travel inside an omnibus to twelve, but there was additional seating on the upper deck. The standard fare in London was threepence for part of a route and sixpence for the entire route.

Hunt says the advantages included cheapness, comfort, warmth and the convenience of being able to read while travelling. The disadvantages included slowness due to the many stops, bad-tempered conductors, broken windows that let in the rain on wet days, the muddy boots and wet umbrellas of fellow passengers, leg cramps when the vehicle was crowded, and the need to be seated quickly to prevent falling over when the horse moved off.

In 1850 Thomas Tilling started omnibus services, and in 1855 the London General Omnibus Company or LGOC was founded to amalgamate and regulate the horse-drawn omnibus services then operating in London.

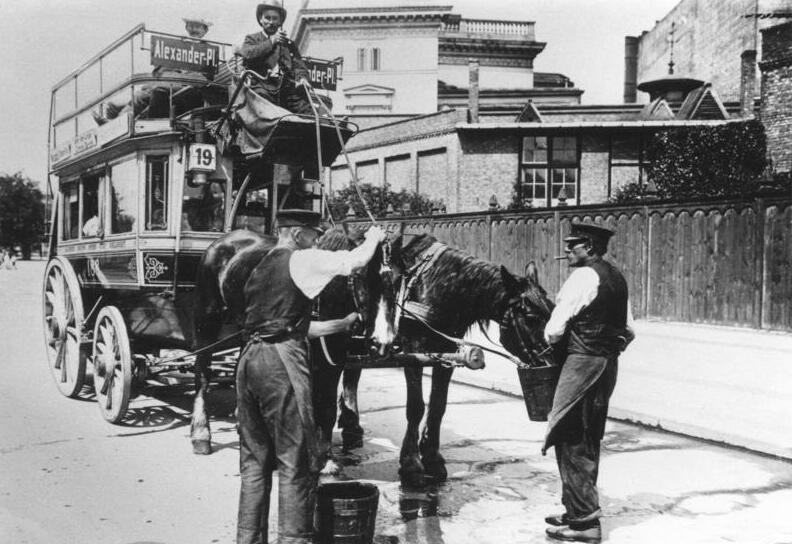
Berlin omnibus

The public transport system of Berlin is the oldest in Germany. In 1825 the first omnibus line from Brandenburger Tor to Charlottenburg was opened by Simon Kremser, running to a timetable. The first omnibus service inside the city operated from 1840 between Alexanderplatz and Potsdamer Bahnhof. It was run by Israel Moses Henoch, who had organized the cab service since 1815.

On 1 January 1847, the Concessionierte Berliner Omnibus Compagnie (Berlin Bus Concession Company) started its first omnibus line. The growing market experienced the launch of numerous additional companies, with 36 omnibus companies in Berlin by 1864.

From the end of the 1820s, the first horse-drawn omnibuses ran in the streets of New York City, facilitating the march uptown.

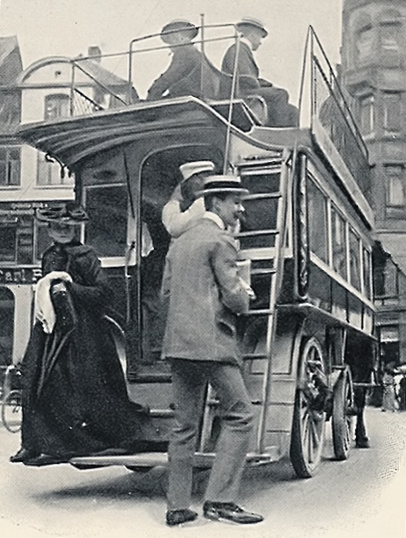
Omnibus in Copenhagen, 1907

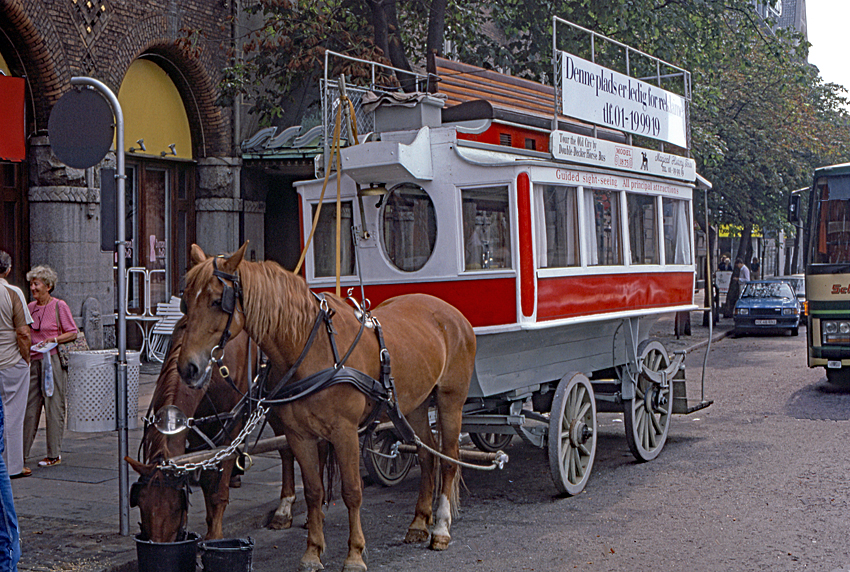
Preserved 1857 omnibus in Copenhagen, 1986

Horses could only pull omnibuses for limited hours, typically 4 or 5 hours per day, covering about a dozen miles. Many systems needed ten or more horses in stable for each omnibus. They had to be housed, groomed, fed and cared for every day, and produced large amounts of manure, which the omnibus company had to store and dispose of.

With the advent of mass-produced steel in around 1860, omnibuses were put on rails; now the same horse could then move 3 to 10 times as many people. This was not only more efficient but faster, and in an age of unpaved streets it gave a far superior ride. These horse-drawn trams were converted to cable-drawn cars in some larger cities; they still exist in San Francisco, the underground cable being driven by stationary steam engines.

At around 1890, electric propulsion became practical and replaced both the horse and the cable, and the number of tram lines rapidly increased. This was seen as a huge advance in urban transport, and was considered a wise investment at that time. These became known as streetcars, trams or trolleys; they still exist in many cities today, though in many places they have been replaced by the motorbus, which requires less infrastructure.

From the beginning of the 20th century, the remaining horse-drawn omnibuses which had not been converted to rail began to be replaced by petrol-driven motor buses, or autobuses. The last recorded horse omnibus in London was a Tilling omnibus which last ran, between Peckham and Honor Oak Tavern, on 4 August 1914. The last Berlin horse omnibus ran on 25 August 1923. Some horse omnibuses remain in use today for sightseeing tours.

== In art and culture ==
Robert Walser published a prose piece in 1916 about a Berlin horse-drawn omnibus, titled "Full."

== See also ==
- Horsecar – Horse-powered tram or streetcar
- Horse-drawn vehicle – Vehicle pulled by one or more horses
- Stagecoach – Horse-drawn public transport coach
