= Montagu Mansions =

Street in the City of Westminster, London

Coordinates: 51°31′11.97″N 0°9′27.69″W

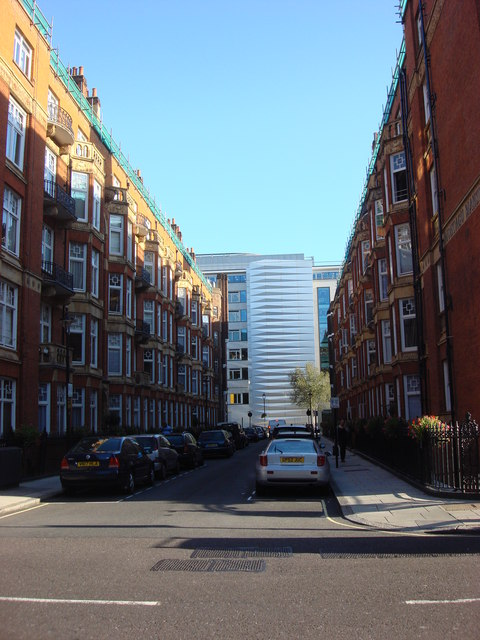
Montagu Mansions, looking south from Crawford Street.

Montagu Mansions is a street in the City of Westminster, in the Marylebone area of London, England, that is made up entirely of mansions flats and in World War II was one of the locations used by the Special Operations Executive.

== Location and character ==
The street runs from York Street in the north to Dorset Street in the south. It is crossed only by Crawford Street.

The street is entirely made up of mansion block flats.

== Second World War ==
Special Force Headquarters rented offices and accommodation in Montagu Mansions during the Second World War. The Special Operations Executive was located in nearby Baker Street.
