= Crawford Street =

Street in Marylebone, London

- Maintained by: Westminster City Council
- Location: City of Westminster, United Kingdom
- Postal code: W1
- Nearest Tube station: Baker Street
- Coordinates: 51°31′10.292″N 0°09′39.695″W

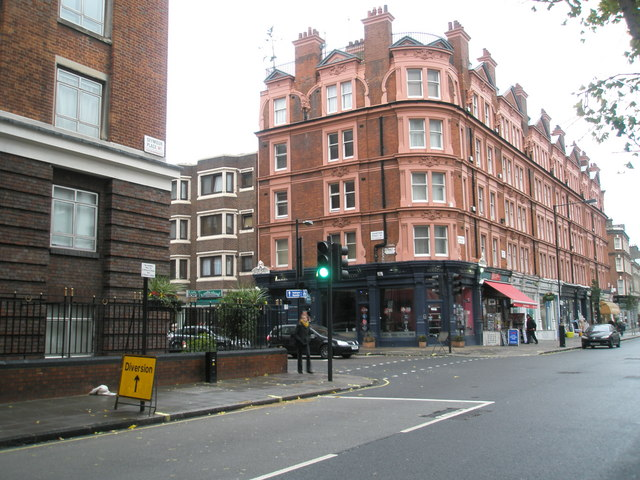
Junction of Crawford Street and Seymour Place.

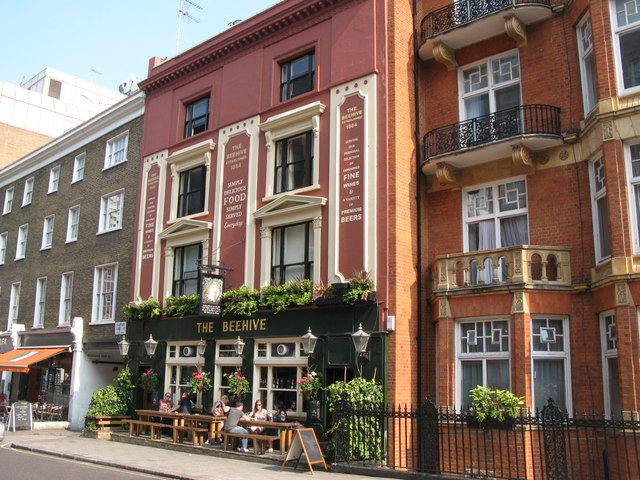
The Beehive pub at 126 Crawford Street.

Crawford Street is a street in the Marylebone district of the City of Westminster. The street contains two grade II listed public houses.

== Location ==
The street runs from the junction of Homer Row and Crawford Place in the west to the junction of Baker Street and Paddington Street in the east. From west to east, the street is crossed by Seymour Place, Wyndham Place, Upper Montagu Street, Durweston Street/Montagu Mews North, Gloucester Place, Montagu Mansions and Durweston Mews/Montagu Row.

== History ==
The street was laid out from 1795. It is named after Tarrant Crawford, a property in Dorset owned by the Portman family who owned much of the property in the area.

== Listed buildings ==
The Duke of Wellington public house at No. 94a Crawford Street is a grade II listed building with Historic England, as is The Beehive at No. 126. There are a number of other listed buildings in the street.
