= West Hackney =

Area of East London, England

Coordinates: 51.560°N 0.070°W

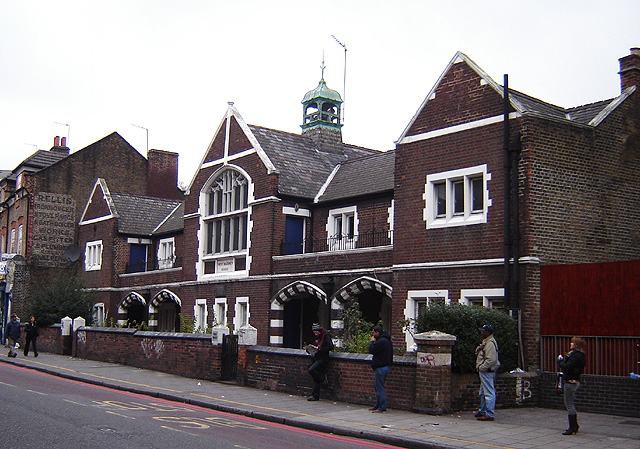
- West Hackney Almshouses, Northwold Road

- Location within Greater London
- OS grid reference: TQ340865
  - Charing Cross: 4.3 mi (6.9 km) SW
- London borough: Hackney
- Ceremonial county: Greater London
- Region: London
- Country: England
- Sovereign state: United Kingdom
- Post town: LONDON
- Postcode district: E5
- Postcode district: N16
- Dialling code: 020
- Police: Metropolitan
- Fire: London
- Ambulance: London
- UK Parliament: Hackney North and Stoke Newington
- London Assembly: North East

West Hackney is a district in the London Borough of Hackney, situated on the eastern side of Ermine Street, the major Roman Road better known as the A10.

The area was part of the Ancient Parish and subsequent Metropolitan Borough of Hackney, but has come to be seen by many as an informal extension of Stoke Newington, as well as a sub-district of Hackney proper.

Rectory Road, the principal railway station, lies 4.3 miles (6.9 km) northeast of Charing Cross.

== History ==
=== Early history ===
The part of Hackney included the hamlet of Newington – entirely distinct from Stoke Newington – which lay between the Roman Road (now known as the A10) and the Common. The hamlet has now been absorbed into the wider urbanised area.

Newington was first recorded in the 1200s and was traditionally one of four Hackney hamlets (together with Dalston, Kingsland and Shacklewell) which were together rated as having, for taxation purposes, the same number of houses as the main 'Hackney Village'.

=== Chapel of ease ===
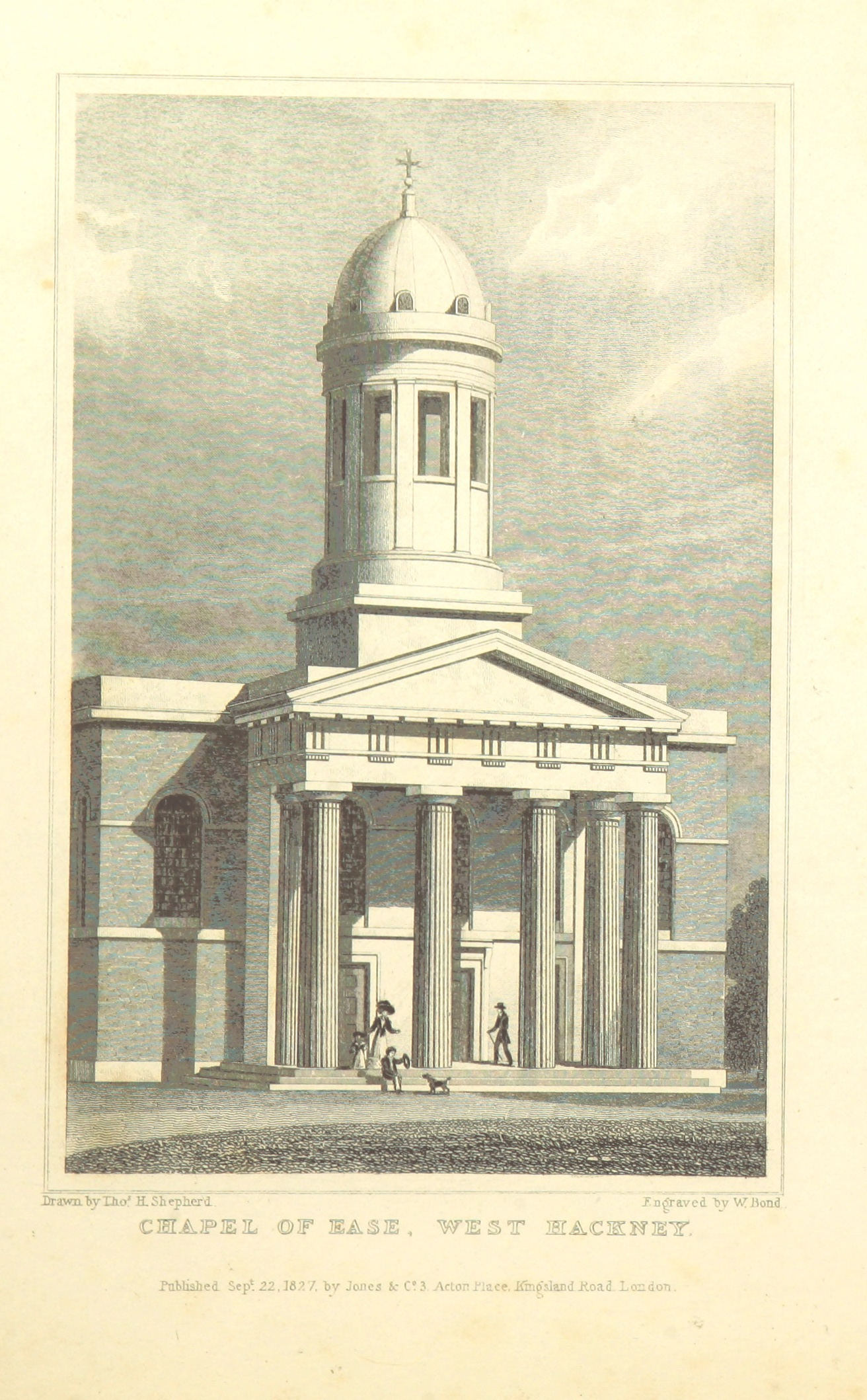
West Hackney Church, on the junction of Amhurst and Stoke Newington Roads

The increasing population of the area saw it gain a chapel of ease in 1814, the church of St. James, designed by Robert Smirke in the Greek Doric style. The 1825 creation of the ecclesiastical parish of West Hackney saw St James elevated to the status of parish church.

=== WWI - London's first air raid ===
The first bomb of the first air raid on London, a 190lb incendiary, fell on 16 Alkham Road on 31 May 1915. The German Army airship LZ 38 had begun the first assault on the capital by a foreign power since 1066. At that time William the Conqueror ravaged Southwark, then crossed the river upstream and ravaged much of the countryside around London in the days after that followed, with the area along Ermine Street (the A10) (including West Hackney) believed to have been badly affected.

The householder, Albert Lovell, had just returned home from posting a letter. The bomb bounced off his chimney and went through his roof, starting a fire on the upper storey. Mr Lovell, his wife, children and houseguests managed to escape the building, but the raid killed seven, including four children, in other parts of London, outraging public opinion.

East London was at particular risk at this time, due to the Kaiser's order, later rescinded, that the raiders limit their attacks to targets east of the Tower of London. An attack by Captain Lanoe Hawker of the Royal Flying Corps destroyed LZ 38 on the ground, at its base in Belgium a week later, but airship raids on London continued until 1917, with attacks from Gotha bombers in 1917-18.

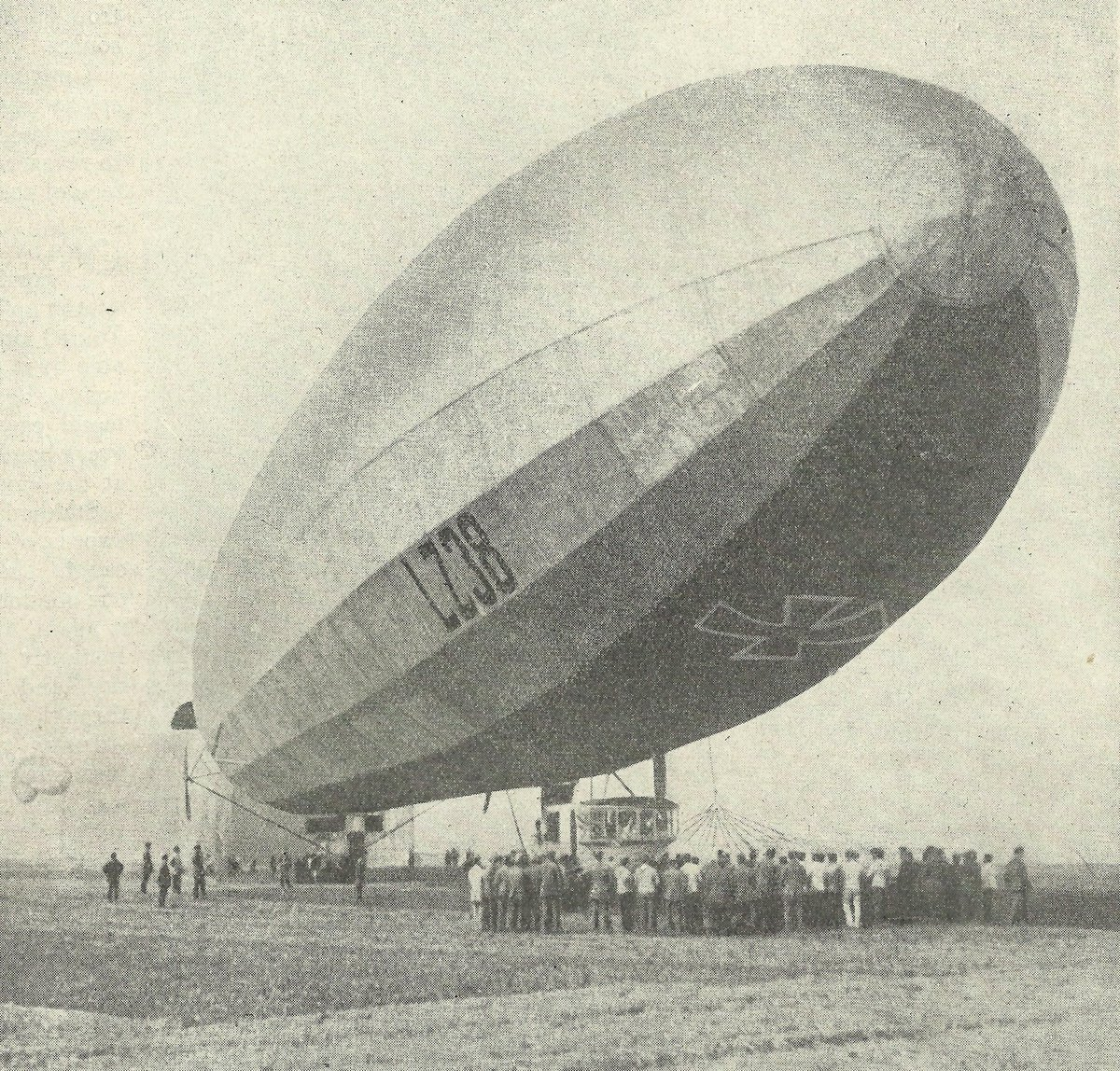
Zeppelin LZ 38 was 164 metres long and had a crew of 18

=== WWII - Blitz ===
West Hackney church was destroyed by enemy action on 19th September 1940, during The Blitz. The remains were cleared away and replaced by a modern building, rededicated to St Paul, in 1960.

The same night the church was destroyed, nearby Benthal Primary School, established in 1876, was badly damaged by a high explosive bomb and temporarily closed as a result. It was rebuilt in 1949 with major extensions added in 1966.

=== 'The Island' redeveloped ===
After the war a number of areas were demolished and redeveloped due to wartime damage or as slum clearance. Among them was an area adjacent to the Benthal School, now known as Stellman Close and then five separate streets, together known as ‘The Island’. The area was not a physical island; it got its name as the impermeable street pattern meant it was largely isolated from neighbouring areas.

This poor, but closely knit community was subject to damp conditions as it was built around the course of the former Hackney Brook and was quarried as a brickfield before being developed.

To avoid long detours Islanders would pay a penny ‘toll’ to people in houses on Evering Road which adjoined the Island, to enable them to take short-cuts by climbing over their back-walls and passing through their gardens. Among the features of the Island was a stable that kept elephants for the nearby Music Hall. On demolition in 1970, the community dispersed to areas such as Essex.

=== Downfall of the Krays ===
In October 1967, the Kray twins and their mother Violet were living in flats at Cedra Court on Cazenove Road. They had been crossed by one of their firm, Jack ‘the Hat’ McVitie and decided to kill him.

Cedra Court on Cazenove Road; home to the Kray twins and their mother in 1967.

On 29th October, the twins and their associates went to the basement flat of a friend Carol Skinner, known as 'Blonde Carol', who lived on Evering Road. McVitie was known to drink in the Regency Club on the junction of Amhurst Road and Rectory Road. Reg Kray sent Tony Lambrianou and his brother Chris to go to the nearby Regency club, see if McVitie was there and if so bring him back to the flat saying that there was a party underway, but without mentioning the presence of the twins, and if possible avoid bringing anyone else back with them.

The twins cousin Ronnie Hart was sent up to the street door to keep watch. About twenty minutes later, just before midnight he came down with the news that Tony and Chris Lambrianou were on there way back with McVitie and two of his friends, Ray and Alan Mills. On arrival Reg stepped out from behind a door, aimed a gun at McVities head which then jammed. McVitie tried to escape, got halfway through the window but was pulled back in and pinned to the floor. Reg Kray grabbed a kitchen knife that had been used to slice lemons for drinks, pinned McVitie to the floor and stabbed him many times in many places in front of a number of witnesses.

The brutal murder of someone those present did not feel deserved death, helped lead to a breakdown of the gangland code of silence, and became a significant factor in their subsequent downfall and imprisonment.

=== Bicentennial of the parish ===
To mark the 200th anniversary of the parish, St Paul's, the parish church installed extensive renewable energy infrastructure including 104 solar panels, four air source heat pumps and energy storage batteries. The government has said that St Paul's is probably the greenest church in Britain.

== Administrative History ==
West Hackney has never been a civil administrative unit in its own right; it has always been an area of Hackney. Hackney was an administrative unit with consistent boundaries from the early Middle Ages to the creation of the larger modern borough in 1965. Hackney was based for many centuries on the Ancient Parish of Hackney. Parishes in Middlesex were grouped into Hundreds, with Hackney part of Ossulstone Hundred. Rapid population growth around London saw the Hundred split into several 'Divisions' during the 1600s, with Hackney part of the Tower Division (aka Tower Hamlets). The Tower Division was noteworthy in that the men of the area owed military service to the Tower of London - and had done even before the creation of the Division.

The Ancient Parishes provided a framework for both civil (administrative) and ecclesiastical (church) functions, but during the nineteenth century there was a divergence into distinct civil and ecclesiastical parish systems. In London the Ecclesiastical Parishes sub-divided to better serve the needs of a growing population, while the Civil Parishes continued to be based on the same Ancient Parish areas.

The ward of West Hackney, with the A10, Roman Ermine Street, used as the western boundary

Under the London Government Act 1899, Hackney became a Metropolitan Borough, with the same boundaries as the pre-existing Civil Parish, with minor rationalisations in places to reflect modern street patterns rather than historic field boundaries and other features. There was a West Hackney electoral ward within that Borough.

The Ecclesiastical Parish (EP) of West Hackney was formed as a sub-division of the Ancient Parish. It merged with the EP of Shacklewell (also a part of Hackney) in 1958 to form the EP of West Hackney St Barnabas.

In 1965, Hackney merged with Shoreditch and Stoke Newington to form the new London Borough of Hackney.

== Geography ==
=== Extent ===
There was formerly a West Hackney electoral ward in the Metropolitan Borough of Hackney, and there is an ecclesiastical parish of West Hackney, a sub-division of the wider Ancient Parish of Hackney. Both the ward and the ecclesiastical parish have used the A10 as the western boundary.

Despite these uses, it has never been an administrative unit in its own right, so lacks formal definition, except in that it has always taken Hackney's western boundary, the originally Roman A10 (in this area named Stoke Newington Road and Stoke Newington High Street - originally High Street, until a name change in 1937) as its own western boundary.

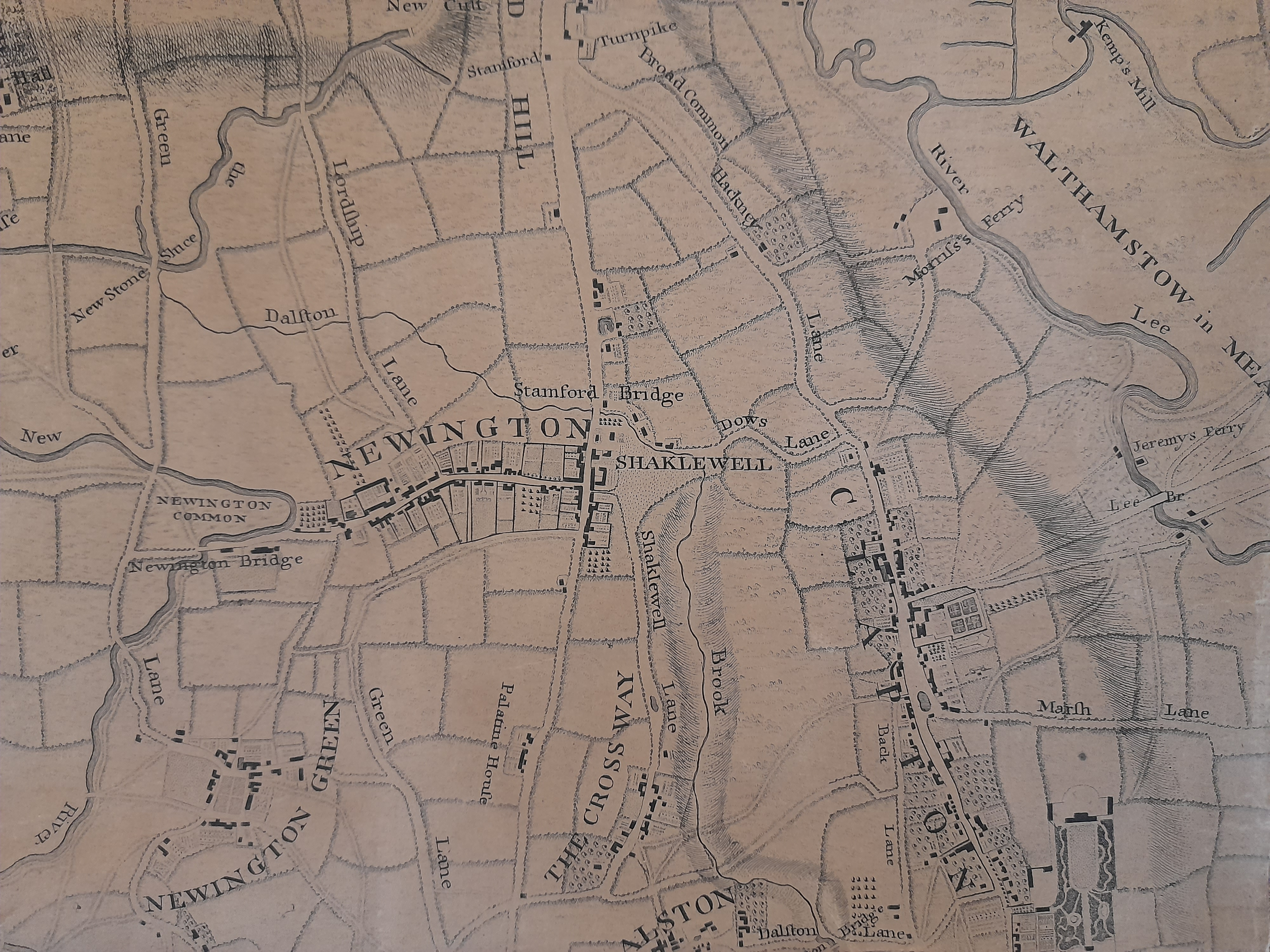
John Rocque 1746 map of London; West Hackney, Newington & Shacklewell

The core of the area lies between the A10 and the railway, but the area as a whole arguably extends further to the north-east.

=== Open Spaces ===
The largest open space in the area is Stoke Newington Common at 2.15 hectares. Originally known as Cockhangar Green it took its current name in the twentieth century.

West Hackney Recreation Ground is one hectare in extent and was originally the burial ground for St James's church (replaced, after bombing, by St Paul's church).

=== Transport ===
West Hackney is served by two railway stations; Rectory Road and Stoke Newington, the latter lying on the ill-defined borders Stoke Newington, West Hackney and Stamford Hill.

== Notable people ==
Marc Feld, better known as Marc Bolan was born at the Eastern Fever Hospital and for his first fifteen years lived in a house facing the common. He attended Northwold School in nearby Upper Clapton.

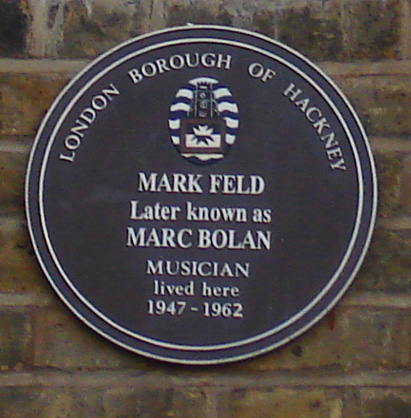
Plaque marking Marc Bolan's childhood home, at 25 Stoke Newington Common, Hackney.
