= Stoke Newington Common =

Open space in Hackney, London, England

Coordinates: 51°33′44″N 0°4′12″W

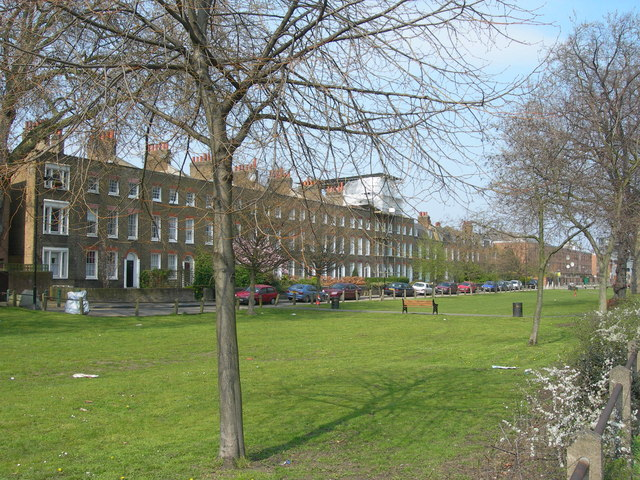
- Interactive map of Stoke Newington Common
- Location: London, England
- OS grid: TQ339865
- Area: 2.15 hectares (5.3 acres)

Stoke Newington Common is an open space in the London Borough of Hackney. It lies between Brooke Road to the south and Northwold Road to the north, straddling a railway line and the busy Rectory Road. The common is 2.15 hectares (5.3 acres) in area.

The common was originally called Cockhanger Green but underwent a series of name changes. The common is part of West Hackney, an area of Hackney that is often informally also described as part of Stoke Newington.

== Name changes ==
The common was originally known as Cockhanger Green. The place name element hanger refers to a wooded slope. The element 'Green' refers to a common, an area where local parishioners had communal rights, such as grazing, to the land.

The name slowly fell out of use as the surrounding areas were being developed in the Victorian era. The name Shacklewell Common was used for a time, as was Newington Common, after a West Hackney hamlet of that name which lay on the west side of the common. The hamlet of Newington was part of Hackney and unconnected with either Stoke Newington or Newington Green. The current name of Stoke Newington Common was in exclusive use in the first half of the twentieth century.

== History ==
This is old common land that came under public ownership in 1872.

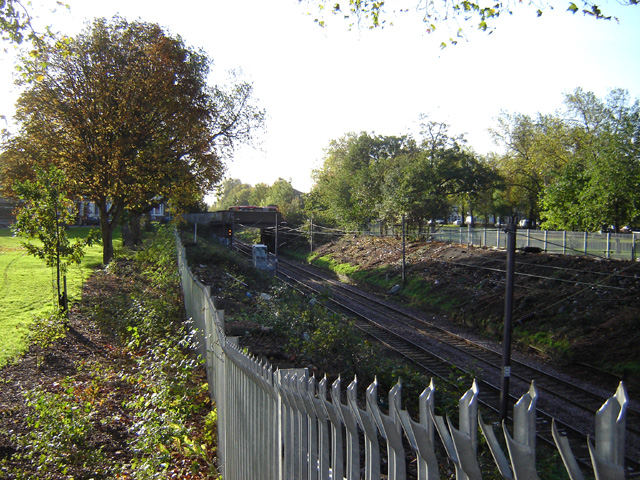
Stoke Newington Common is dissected by this railway cutting and two busy roads. (November 2005)

Not merely the common's name has been mangled by time. Unlike its near neighbour, Hackney Downs, this land has been dissected by London's Victorian transport links. The deep cutting of the railway line between Stoke Newington and Rectory Road railway stations runs straight through the common from north to south, while the parallel Rectory Road making part of the A10 gyratory slices off another strip to the west. Finally the road called Stoke Newington Common carrying a busy bus route chops off a section to the south.

The now buried and lost Hackney Brook once ran across the north of the common, but this has long been replaced by the busy Northwold Road. This was due to the increased population at the time of its burial reducing the brook to no more than an open sewer.

A 400,000-year-old palaeolithic flint axe factory was found by W.G. Smith in 1878 on the south side of the common and in market gardens on the north side of the common. This Palaeolithic floor is associated with an ancient terrace carved by the River Thames called the Upper Taplow Terrace that extends from Stoke Newington past Canonbury as far as Rosemary Branch. It is a remnant of a plain where extensive evidence the earliest human occupation of Britain has been found, notably at Swanscombe in Kent.

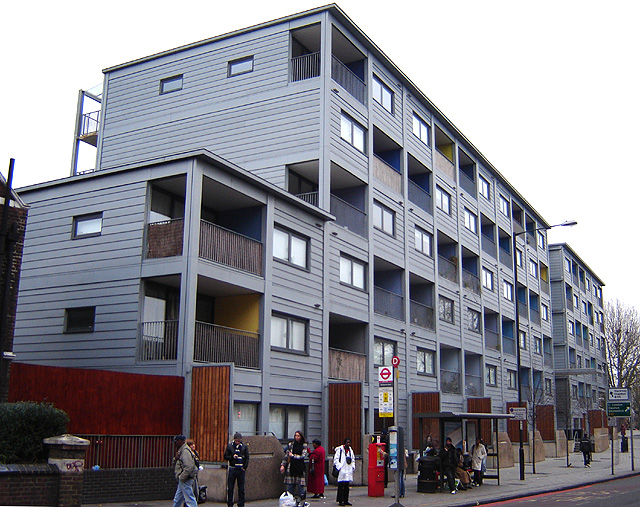
The innovative Raines Court development on Northwold Road. (December 2005)

The north side of the common was overlooked by Gibson Gardens; an early example of quality tenement dwellings for working class people built in 1880 and still unchanged today, some parts are highly desirable for owner-occupiers. Gibson Gardens is now masked from the common by the innovative Raines Court on Northwold Road on the site of the old dairy. Built by the Peabody Trust, this is just the second multi-storey modular housing development to be built in Britain, and offers one approach to the increased demand for housing in the area.

Local residents campaigned unsuccessfully to have Rectory Road closed off over the common and the railway roofed for many years with the prohibitively high cost of the works reducing the possibility of success to zero.

== Nearest stations ==
- Rectory Road railway station
- Stoke Newington railway station

== Notable people ==
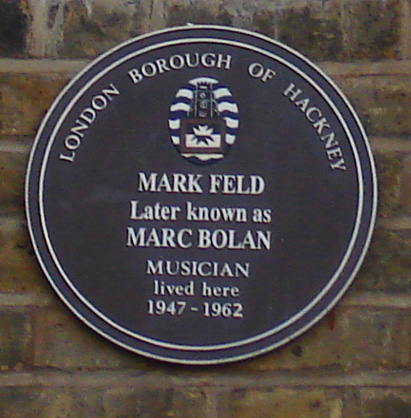
Plaque at 25 Stoke Newington Common commemorating Marc Bolan's childhood. (November 2005)

The common can claim at least one internationally famous resident, Marc Bolan of the band T. Rex, who lived at 25 Stoke Newington Common, on the south side, from birth until the age of 15.

Another more or less famous resident was Frederick Lewis Demuth (1851-1929) who died here at "13 Stoke Newington Common" on 29 January 1929. Demuth was the illegitimate son of Karl Marx and his servant Helena Demuth.
