= Hackney, London =

District in East London, England

Coordinates: 51.543°N 0.059°W

Hackney
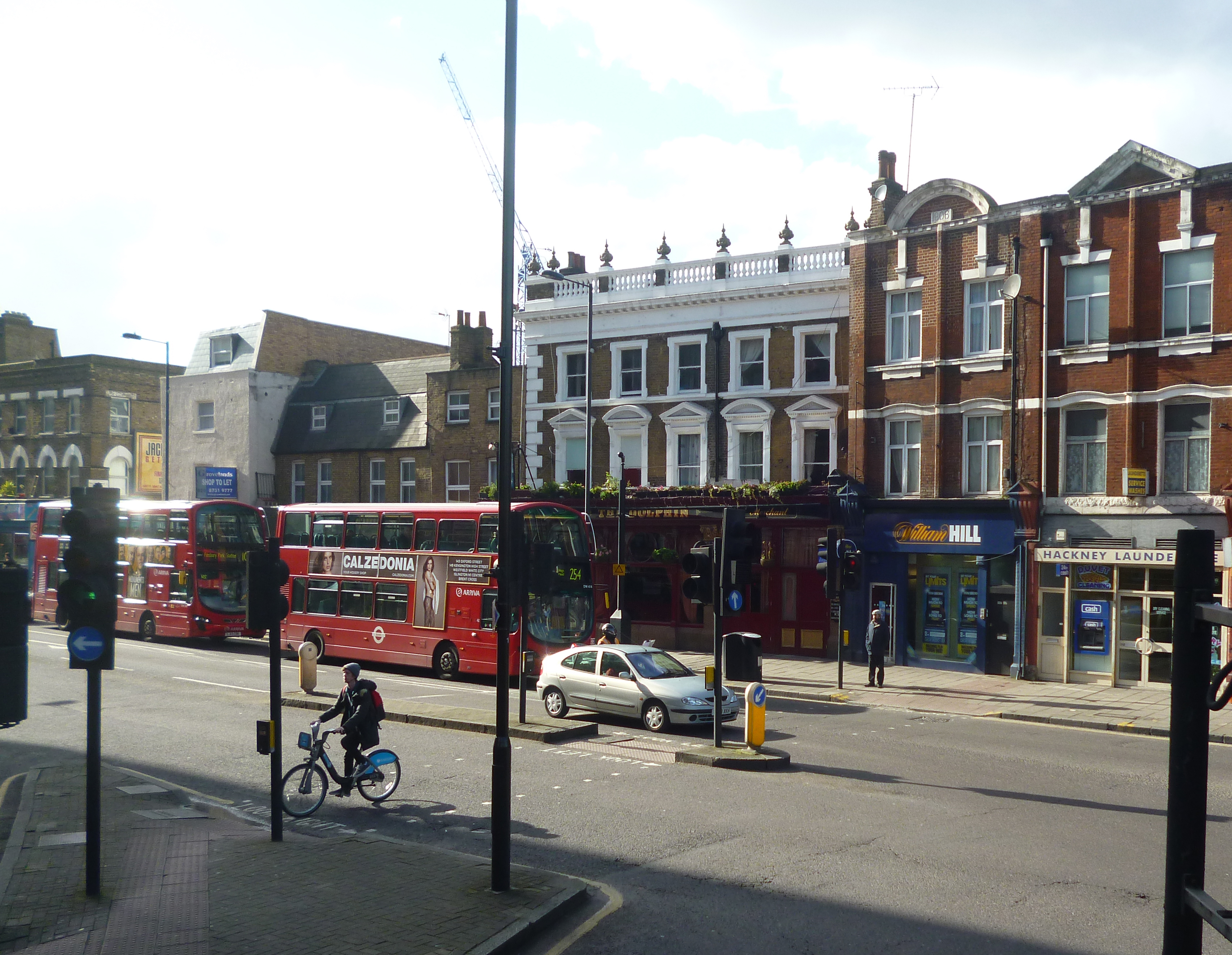
- Mare Street, Hackney, 2014

- Location within Greater London
- Population: 259,956 (2021 census)
- OS grid reference: TQ347845
  - Charing Cross: 4 mi (6.4 km) SW
- London borough: Hackney; Haringey; Tower Hamlets
- Ceremonial county: Greater London
- Region: London
- Country: England
- Sovereign state: United Kingdom
- Post town: LONDON
- Postcode district: E5, E8, E9, E20, N1, N16
- Dialling code: 020
- Police: Metropolitan
- Fire: London
- Ambulance: London
- UK Parliament: Hackney North and Stoke Newington Hackney South and Shoreditch
- London Assembly: North East; Enfield and Haringey; City and East

Hackney is a district in East London, England, forming around two-thirds of the area of the modern London Borough of Hackney, Haringey and Tower Hamlets. It is 4 miles (6.4 km) northeast of Charing Cross and includes part of the Queen Elizabeth Olympic Park. Historically it was within the county of Middlesex.

In the past it was also referred to as Hackney Proper to distinguish it from the village which subsequently developed in the vicinity of Mare Street, the term Hackney Proper being applied to the wider district.

Hackney is a large district, whose long established boundaries encompass the sub-districts of Homerton, Dalston (including Kingsland and Shacklewell), De Beauvoir Town, Upper and Lower Clapton, Stamford Hill, Hackney Central, Cambridge Heath, Hackney Wick, South Hackney and West Hackney.

South Hackney is straddled between the boroughs of Hackney and Haringey, and Cambridge Heath is between Hackney and Tower Hamlets.

== Governance ==
The Parish and Borough of Hackney

Hackney's traditional boundaries, together with electoral wards as of 1916

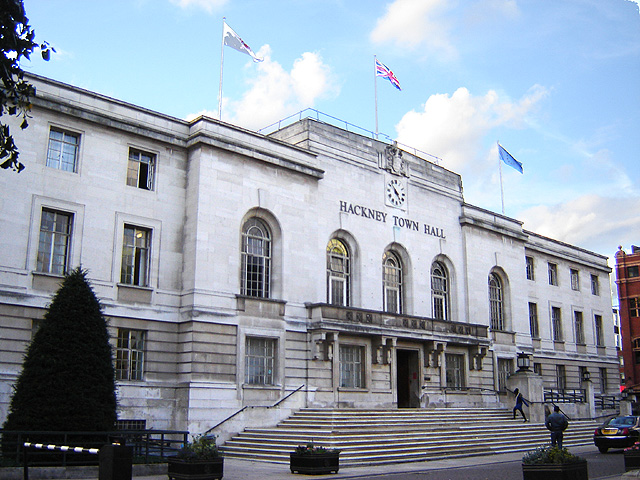
Hackney Town Hall, now used for the modern borough

Hackney was an administrative unit with consistent boundaries from the early Middle Ages to the creation of the larger modern borough in 1965. It was based for many centuries on the Ancient Parish of Hackney, the largest in Middlesex.

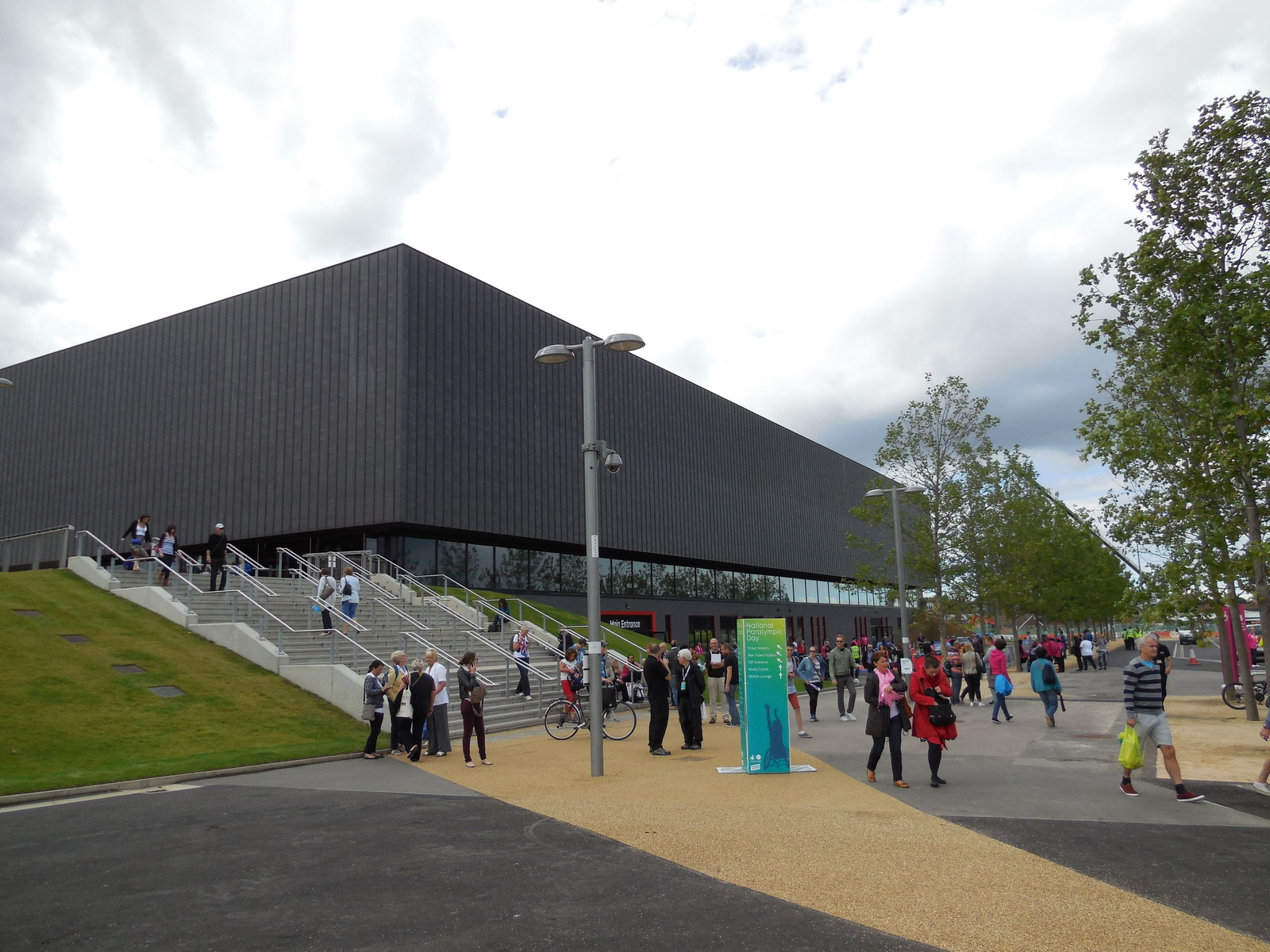
The Copper Box Arena, in the Queen Elizabeth Olympic Park.

Hackney was a sub-manor of the Manor of Stepney, and the ancient parish of Hackney was an early daughter parish of Stepney, though the date the Hackney parish was established is not known. Hackney's church is first recorded around 1275 and Hackney may have been an independent parish by that time. The parish would have been based on the boundaries of the sub-manor of Hackney at the time it was created. Any boundary changes to the manor after around 1180 would not be reflected in changes to the parish boundaries as, across England, they became fixed at around that time, so that boundaries could no longer be changed at all, despite changes to manorial landholdings – though there were examples of sub-division in some parishes. The manorial system in England had largely broken down in England by 1400, with manors fragmenting and their role being much reduced.

The area was part of the historic (or ancient) county of Middlesex, but military and most (or all) civil county functions were managed more locally, by the Tower Division (also known as the Tower Hamlets), a historic 'county within a county', under the leadership of the Lord-Lieutenant of the Tower Hamlets (the post was always filled by the Constable of the Tower of London). The military loyalty to the Tower meant local men served in the Tower garrison and Tower Hamlets Militia, rather than the Middlesex Militia. This arrangement lasted until 1900.

The ancient parishes provided a framework for both civil (administrative) and ecclesiastical (church) functions, but during the nineteenth century, there was a divergence into distinct civil and ecclesiastical parish systems. In London, the ecclesiastical parishes sub-divided to better serve the needs of a growing population, while the civil parishes continued to be based on the same ancient parish areas.

The Metropolis Management Act 1855 merged the civil parishes of Hackney and Stoke Newington under a new Hackney District. This proved unpopular, especially in more affluent Stoke Newington, and after four unsuccessful attempts, the two parishes regained their independence when they were separated by mutual consent under the Metropolis Management (Plumstead and Hackney) Act 1893 (56 & 57 Vict. c. 55).

The London Government Act 1899 converted the parishes into metropolitan boroughs based on the same boundaries, sometimes with minor rationalisations. Neighbouring Stoke Newington was smaller than the desired size for the new boroughs, and there were proposals to re-merge Stoke Newington and Hackney, or to detach the northern part of Hackney and join it with Stoke Newington. These proposals were rejected due to the experience of "intolerable and interminable feuds" between the districts when they were previously "forced together", and because the First Lord of the Treasury, Arthur Balfour recognised that there was "great ill-feeling and mutual ill-will... between the inhabitants of the two districts".

In 1965, Hackney merged with Shoreditch and Stoke Newington to form the new London Borough of Hackney.

Prior to 1994, a small part of Victoria Park was in Hackney, but a minor boundary alteration was made so that the whole park came under the control of Tower Hamlets.

== Place name origin ==
The first surviving records of the place name are Hakney (1231) and Hakeneye (1242 and 1294). The name is Old English, but the meaning is not certain. It seems clear however that the 'ey' element refers to an island or a raised or otherwise dry area in marshland. The term 'island' in this context can also mean land situated between two streams.

The 'island' may have been beside the Lea or perhaps near the confluence of the Hackney Brook and Pigwell Brook in the Hackney Central area.

The Oxford Dictionary of English Place Names examined various interpretations of the place name and favoured the interpretation that Hackney means 'Haka's island', with Haka being a notable local person The Dictionary suggests that the 'Hack' element may also derive from:

- The Old English 'Haecc' meaning a hatch – an entrance to a woodland or common.
- Or alternatively from 'Haca' meaning a hook, and in this context, a bend of the river.
- The Biblical scholar James Rendel Harris theorised that 'Hack' means 'woodpecker'.

== Ecclesiastical parish ==
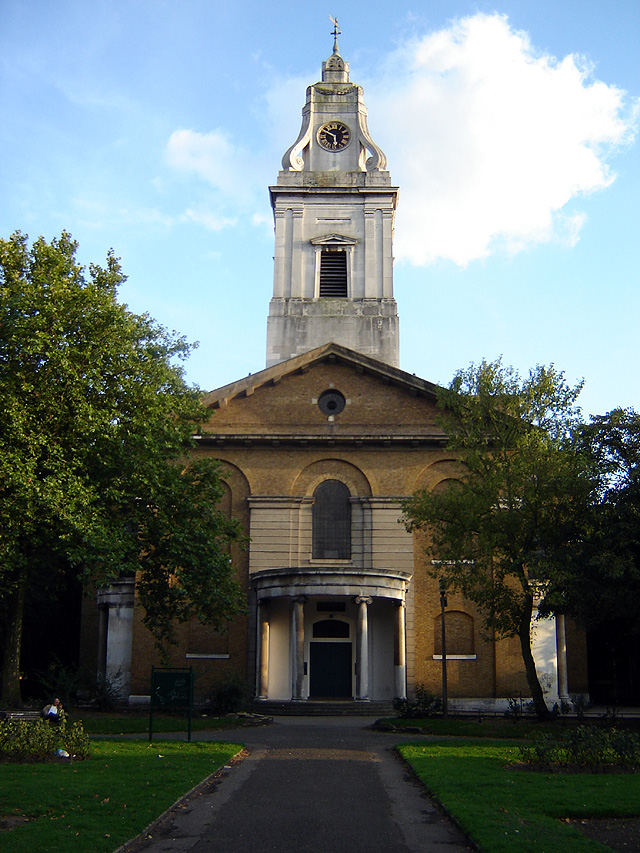
St John's parish church, Hackney. (September 2005)

The ancient parish, was originally dedicated to St Augustine. By c. 1660 it was rededicated to St John the Baptist and usually referred to as St John at Hackney. It and its successors are in the Diocese of London. From 1825, building and the population of Hackney increased rapidly and new parishes were formed, a few of which have since been dissolved:

- St John of Jerusalem, South Hackney in 1825
- St James, West Hackney aka (West Hackney Church) in 1825
- St Thomas the Apostle, Stamford Hill in 1828
- St Philip, Dalston in 1841
- St Peter, De Beauvoir Town in 1841
- St Barnabas, Homerton in 1846
- St James the Greater, Clapton in 1863
- St Augustine of Canterbury, Hackney Wick in 1867
- St Matthew, Upper Clapton in 1866
- Christ Church, Clapton in 1871
- All Saints, Lower Clapton in 1873
- St Luke, Homerton in 1873
- Holy Trinity, Dalston in 1879
- All Souls, Clapton Park in 1884
- St Michael and All Angels, Stoke Newington Common in 1886
- St Paul, Lower Homerton in 1889
- St Mary of Eton, Hackney Wick in 1893
- St Bartholomew, Dalston in 1897

Periphal parts of the ancient parish contributed to three other new parishes as follows:

- St Michael and All Angels, South Hackney London Fields in 1865 — with parts of St Jude, Bethnal Green
- Christ Church, South Hackney in 1871 — with parts of St James the Less, Bethnal Green, St John, Bethnal Green, and St Stephen, Haggerston
- St Mark, Dalston in 1871 — with parts of St Matthias, Stoke Newington

== History ==
=== Pre-Roman ===
Hackney is a mostly low-lying area in proximity to two rivers, the Lea and the Hackney Brook. This would have made the area attractive for pastoral and arable agriculture, meaning most of the area is likely to have been deforested at an early date. There is archaeological evidence for settlement and agriculture as far back as the Stone Age.

During the late Iron Age, the area was part of the territory of the powerful Catuvellauni tribe.

=== Roman ===
There will have been a network of probably minor, local roads in Hackney before the Romans conquered southern Britain after 43AD, but the area's proximity to the provincial capital, Londinium, meant that it was soon crossed by two large long-distance routes. The first was Ermine Street (modern A10) which emerged from Bishopsgate and headed north to Lincoln and York. The second was a route which branched off Ermine Street just outside Bishopsgate and headed SW-NE across Hackney, across the Dalston, Hackney Central and Lower Clapton areas to cross to the Lea on its way to Great Dunmow in Essex. This crossing appears to have crossed the Lea 168 metres south of the Bridge at Mandeville Street near Millfields Road (sometimes known as Pond Lane Bridge). Three Roman sarcophagus burials have been found, two of stone and one of marble. These, particularly the marble example indicate a high-status settlement of some sort. The stone examples had a coin hoard found nearby.

=== Anglo-Saxon ===
The area around Millfields Park, Lower Clapton, is sometimes described as the site of a battle in which Aescwine, having rebelled against Octa, King of Kent, defeats him in battle and became the (reputed) first King of Essex. The ford over the Lea neighbouring Leyton is referred to in the (much later) accounts of the battle. Historical records describing this period are extremely sparse, so the historicity of the battle and even Aescwine himself is disputed.

The place name Hackney is Old English, so was probably first applied in this era.

Hackney was part of the territory of the Middle Saxons, a people who seem to have formed a province of the East Saxons, albeit not part of their core territory. The area was a part of the huge manor of Stepney, an area owned by the Bishop of London, and its great size and proximity to the City means it may have been part of the grant of land made when the Diocese of London (The East Saxon Diocese), was re-established in 604 AD.

Later, the Middle and East Saxon area would become subject to various other Kingdoms, last among them Wessex, which sought to unite England and roll back the partial Viking conquest of the country. A coin of Egbert of Wessex was found on Stamford Hill. The Kings of Wessex divided their kingdom into shires, with Hackney becoming part of the shire of Middlesex, an area named after the Middle Saxons.

=== The Norman Conquest ===
After their victory at Hastings, the Normans needed to secure London. To this end, they burned Southwark, crossed the river upstream and harried much of Middlesex and Hertfordshire. The Manor of Stepney was less badly hit than much of the rest of Middlesex, though the area along Ermine Street (the A10), in Hackney, is believed to have been badly affected.

The Domesday Book of 1086 covered England at manorial level, so Hackney is only assessed as part of Manor of Stepney, of which it was a sub-manor. The landscape at this time was largely agricultural, Domesday returns for Middlesex indicate that it was around 30% wooded (much of it wood-pasture), about double the English average. Hackney would have had a lower proportion than the county as a whole, consisting of mostly lower land, close to rivers that made it more attractive for farming. The proportion of woodland in England decreased sharply between the Conquest and the Black Death due to the pressure of a rapidly increasing population, and the same pressures would have been experienced here.

=== Post-medieval ===
From the Tudor period onwards, the various settlements in Hackney grew as wealthy Londoners moved to what they saw as a pleasant rural alternative to living in London which was, nonetheless, close to the capital; in some ways it was comparable to a modern commuter town. A number of royal courtiers lived in Homerton, while Henry VIII had a palace at Brooke House, Upper Clapton, where Queen Mary took the Oath of Supremacy. Sutton House, the oldest surviving residential building in the district, was built in 1535.

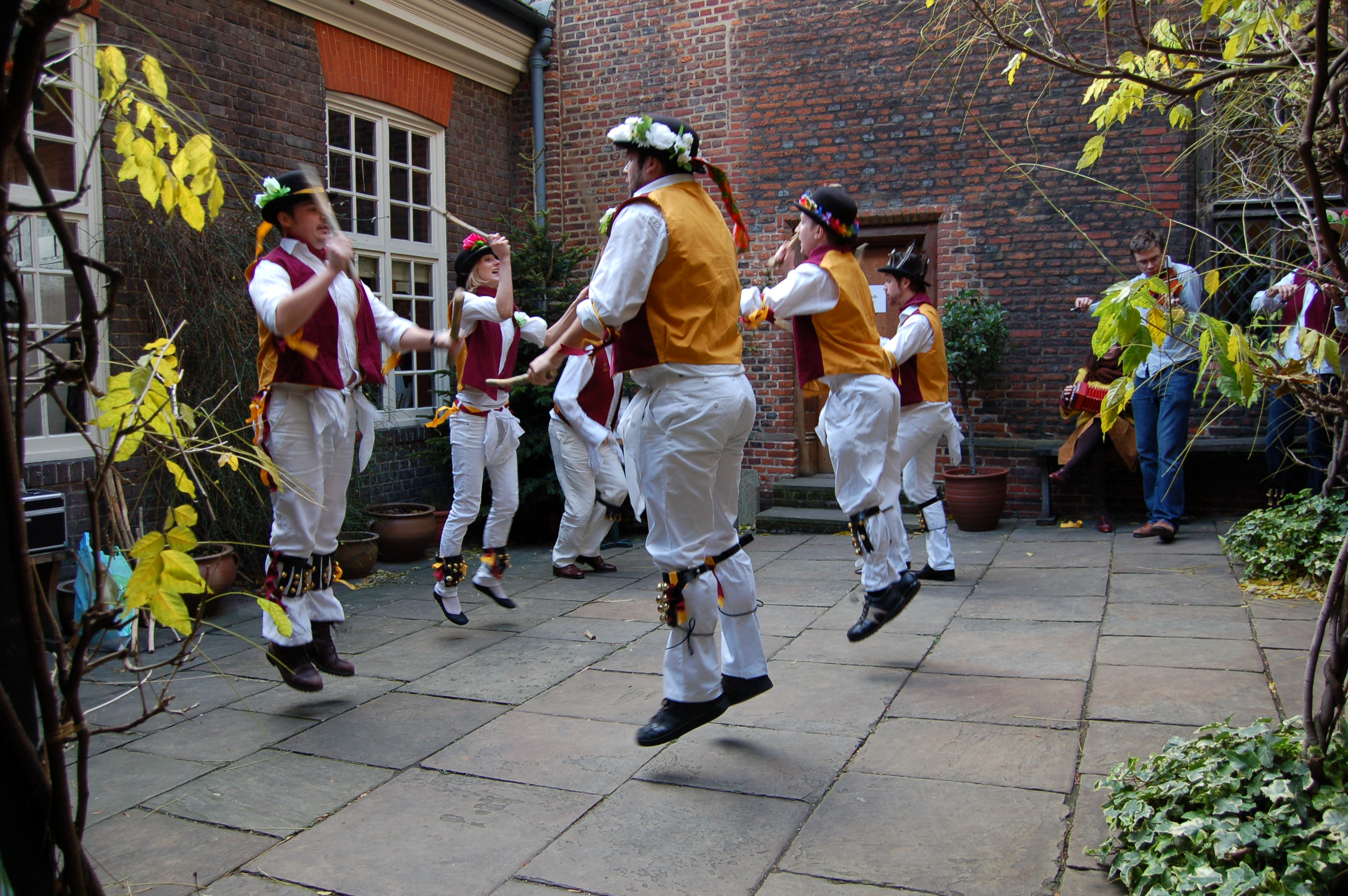
Morris Dancers perform at Sutton House

=== Urbanisation ===
The main ‘Hackney Village’ grew much larger than the others, in 1605 having as many houses as Dalston, Newington (i.e. West Hackney), Kingsland and Shacklewell combined.

In 1727 Daniel Defoe said of the hamlets of Hackney

All these, except the Wyck-house, are within a few years so encreas'd in buildings, and so fully inhabited, that there is no comparison to be made between their present and past state: Every separate hamlet is encreas'd, and some of them more than treble as big as formerly; Indeed as this whole town is included in the bills of mortality, tho' no where joining to London, it is in some respects to be call'd a part of it.

As the population of London and surrounding areas grew, areas such as Hackney became home to market gardens which used new agricultural methods to produce large amounts of fruit and vegetables to help feed the capital. At this time Hackney was particularly famous for a type of turnip grown in the area.

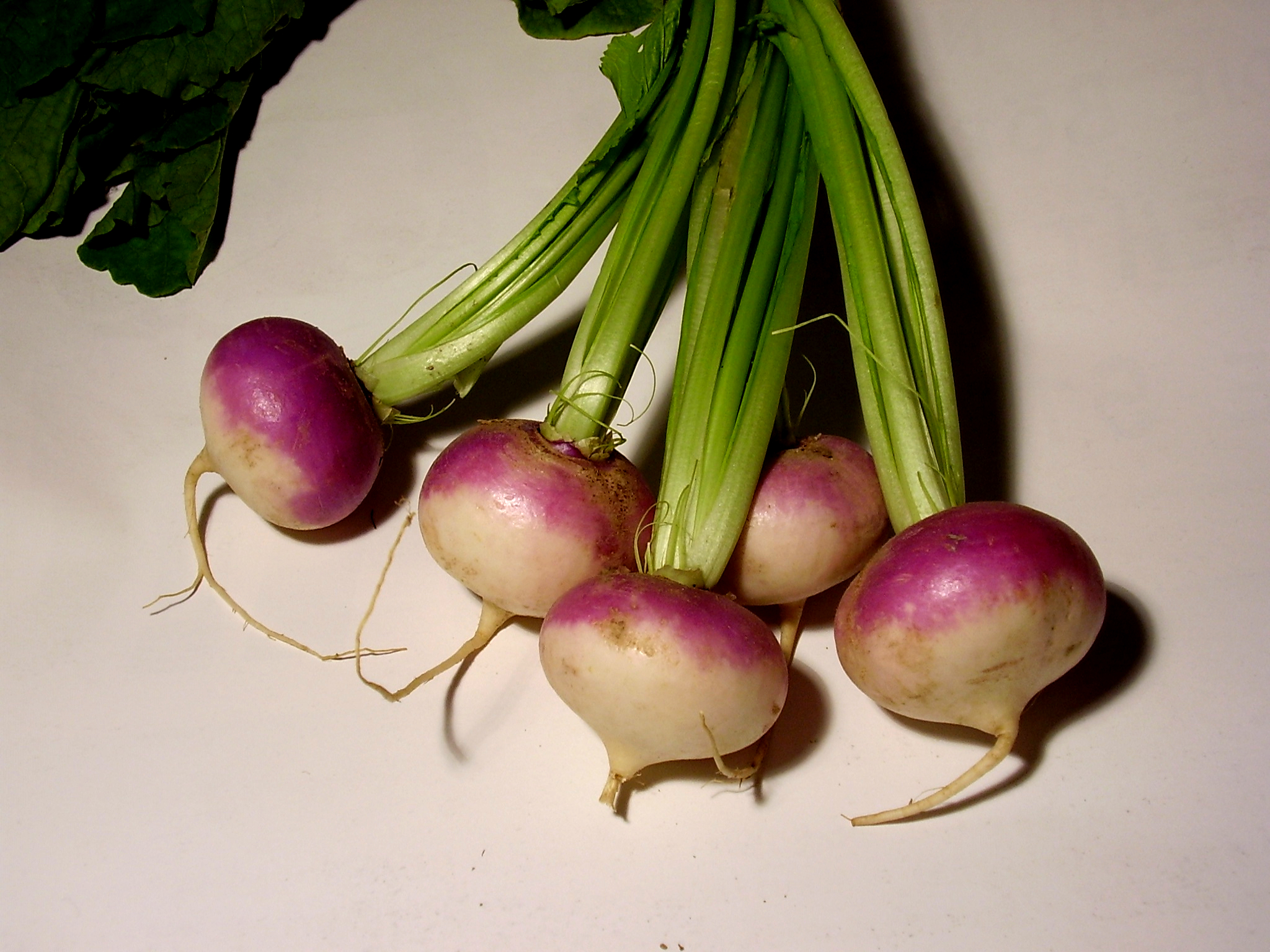
Hackney was famous for the quality of the small, sweet turnips grown in the parish.

In the 1770s Hackney became home to one of the largest and most celebrated plant nurseries in England, Loddiges Paradise Field Nursery, founded by German born Joachim Conrad Loddiges (1738–1826) and continued by his son George Loddiges (1786–1846), and known as The Hackney Botanic Nursery Garden. With its range of heated glasshouses the nursery was famed for displaying newly discovered plants from around the globe including the Americas, the Caribbean, Australia and the far East.

The growth of the East End of London was stimulated by the building of Regent's Canal between 1812 and 1816, with construction work on a new town at De Beauvoir beginning in 1823 and continuing through the 1830s. The arrival of the railways, around 1850, accelerated the spread of London and the expansion of the existing nuclei so that Hackney was almost entirely built up by 1870.

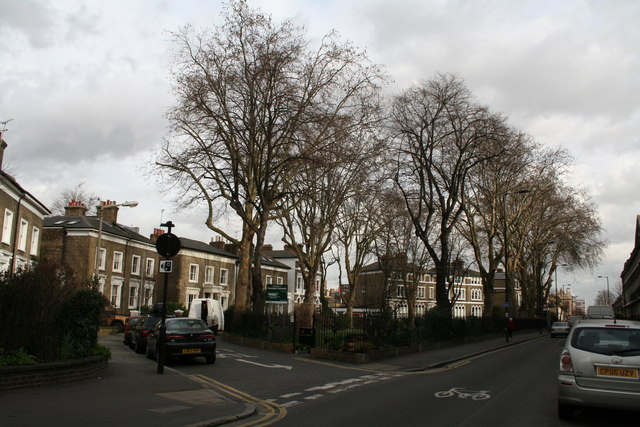
Victorian housing stock at Cassland Road and Cassland Crescent, South Hackney

=== Edwardian ===
In 1907, the Fifth Congress of the Russian Social Democratic Labour Party held at the Brotherhood Church on the east side of Southgate Road. The conference was held in the UK after being banned in other countries.

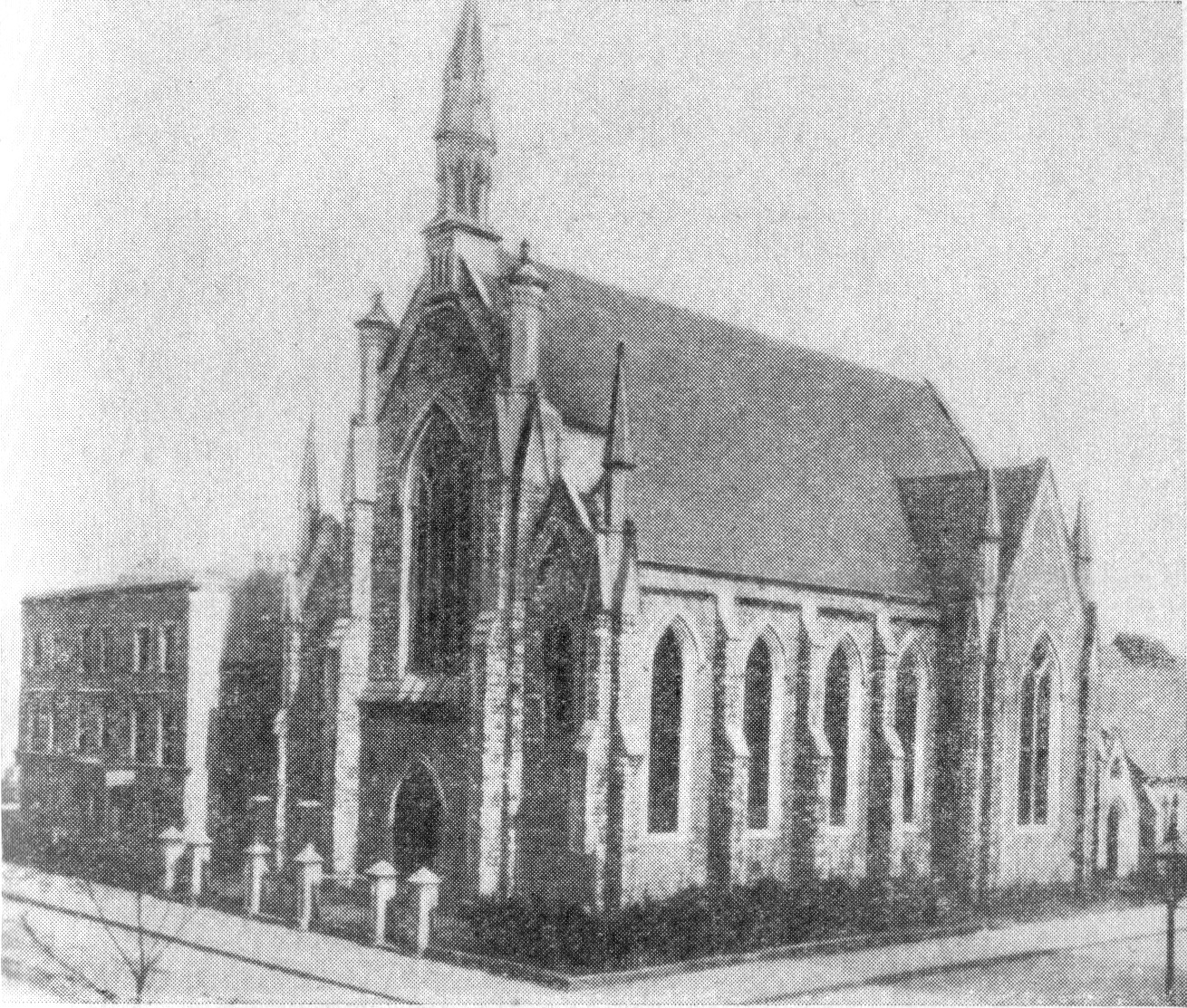
The Christian Socialist Brotherhood Church, on Southgate Road, hosted a congress attended by Lenin, Stalin and other Russian radicals

Attendees included Lenin, Stalin, Maxim Gorky, Rosa Luxemburg and Leon Trotsky. The congress debated strategy for a communist revolution in Russia and strengthened the position of Lenin's Bolshevik.

=== Hackney Gurkhas ===
In 1859, fear of a potential French Invasion led to measures such as the launch of iron-hulled HMS Warrior, and the creation of the Volunteer Force, formed in part from local communities forming Rifle Volunteer Companies (RVC). Several were formed in the Tower Hamlets (or Tower Division) area, including at least three in Hackney. As reserve volunteers from the Tower Hamlets, they were regarded as inheriting the heritage of militia, trained band and other Tower Hamlets forces going back to the War of the Three Kingdoms and beyond.

The RVC needed better co-ordination, so from 1860 to 1912, Hackney was part of the recruiting district of the 7th Battalion of the Essex Regiment. Hackney's companies constituded three of the battalion's eight companies, Leyton and Walthamstow provided two each, and West Ham (with a depot at Silvertown) one. The Essex Regiment's nickname of the Pompadours comes from its unique red-purple "Rose Pompadour" facing colour used in uniforms and regimental flags.

The establishment of a recruitment district spanning the Lower Lea was anomalous in that Hackney (unlike Leyton, Walthamstow and West Ham) was part of the Tower Hamlets of Middlesex, rather than Essex. However the local connections meant the arrangement worked well.

From 1912 onward, Hackney raised its own infantry battalion with the Hackney companies of the 7th Essex transferred over to form the core of the new battalion, which retained some Essex Regiment traditions until at least the 1920s. The 7th Essex struggled to replace their Hackney comrades and were still understrength at the start of WW1. The new battalion focussed recruitment in Hackney, but also attracted men from neighbouring areas such as Stepney and Shoreditch.

The battalions would be nicknamed the Hackney Gurkhas or Cockney Gurkhas. It’s not clear which shared traits gave rise to the nickname - though smart appearance, tenacity and cheerful resourcefulness have all been suggested - but some sources emphasise their short stature, resulting from a malnourished upbringing in some of the country’s poorest districts. Whatever the origin, the Eastenders were flattered by being likened to their tough far eastern counterparts and proudly adopted the term, ensuring it survived through both world wars and beyond. One of the battalions served alongside a Gurkha battalion during WW1 and were gifted a set of their emblematic kukri knives, which were displayed with pride at the Hillman Street headquarters, behind the Town Hall.

The battalion had its own cap badge, depicting Hackney's emblem, St Augustine's Tower, together with the borough's latin motto Justitia Turris Nostra. A direct translation into English is Justice is our tower, but this may be paraphrased as Fairness is our strength.

The battalion was 'duplicated' in WWI, so that Hackney raised two front-line infantry battalions for the London Regiment: the 1/10th (City of London) Battalion (Hackney) and the 2/10th (City of London) Battalion (Hackney).

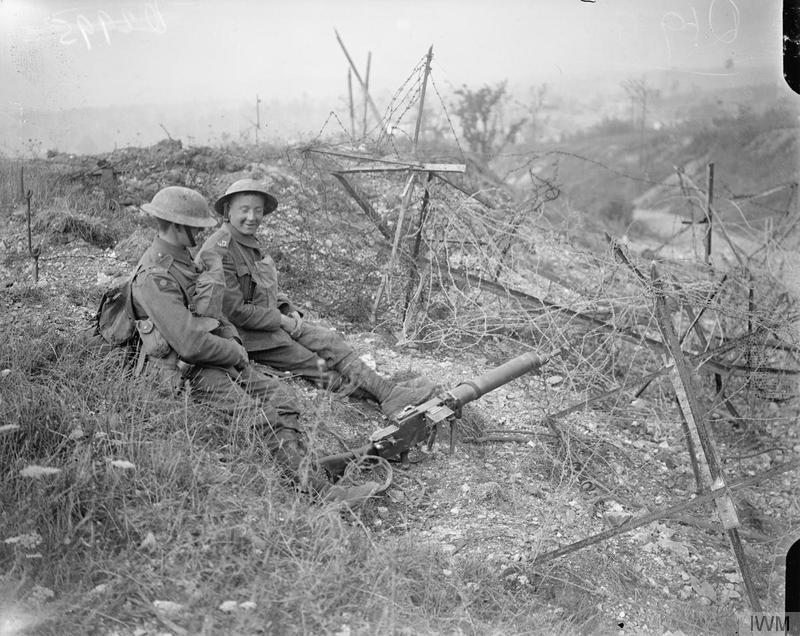
Men of the 2/10th Hackney Battalion with a captured German Machine Gun. On 8th August, the opening day of the Hundred Days Offensive, 1918

The 1/10th was assigned to the 162nd (East Midland) Brigade in the 54th (East Anglian) Infantry Division, seeing service at Gallipoli and the Middle East, finishing the war in Beirut. The 2/10th was assigned to the 175th (2/3rd London) Brigade, in the 58th (2/1st London) Division, fighting on the western front and finishing the war in the Peruwelz area of Belgium. A third Hackney battalion, the 3/10th was based in the UK and used as a training unit, providing reinforcements to the two frontline battalions.

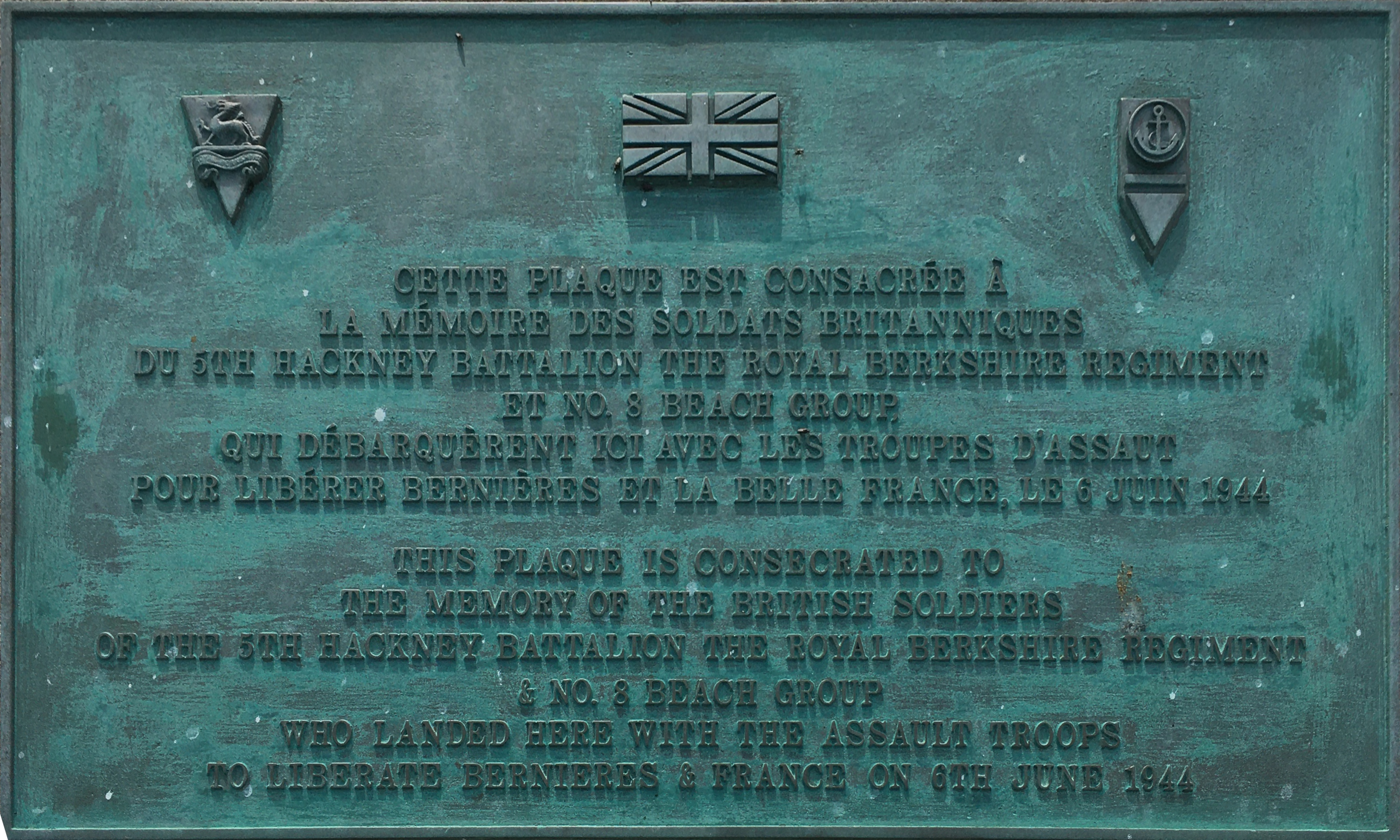
Memorial to the Hackney Battalion at Bernières-sur-Mer

By WW2, Hackney's battalion was organised as the 5th Battalion of the Royal Berkshire Regiment, a very unusual arrangement as Hackney had no connection with Berkshire, and most of the men had never been there.

On 1 September 1939 Germany invaded Poland, and with war expected, the Battalion was mustered to West Ham United's Boleyn Ground. A call for volunteers would lead to some of the Hackney men, together with men from other units, forming No. 3 Independent Company, a precursor to the Commandos. After service in Norway, the Company was disbanded and the men returned to their units. In the early years of the war the Hackneys were deployed to defend the east coast against a potential German invasion.

The Hackney Battalion came ashore under fire, in support of the Canadian 3rd Division, at and around Bernières-sur-Mer, Juno Beach, early on the morning of D-Day, the 6th June 1944. It fought as infantry on D-Day, with a particular focus on mopping up by-passed strongpoints (such as pill-boxes) and other resistance so troops landing later could land unhindered. Some elements pushed forward five miles with the Canadians that night.

After D-Day the focus switched to its Beach Group duties which was mainly stevedore work, but also included marking minefields, processing prisoners, the wounded and the dead. The battalion continued to take casualties through artillery, airstrikes, mines and accidents.

The allies broke out from Normandy in July 1944, at which point the Hackney Battalion was broken up with most troops being re-assigned to battalions which had suffered the highest losses in the campaign. Officers were astonished at the offended parochial pride this caused among the Hackney men. As a concession to their local loyalties, whole intact Hackney platoons were transferred to the depleted battalions receiving them. These platoons fought their way across France, Belgium the Netherlands and into Germany. Some other platoons joined General Slim's 14th Army (known as the Forgotten Army) to campaign against the Japanese in India and Burma.

An undersize rump of the battalion was retained as a 'Bank Group', a similar role to a Beach Group, and deployed in the Battle of the Bulge as a mobile reserve. At 2am on 24 March 1945, two companies of the Hackney Battalion troops, acting in support of 15th (Scottish) Infantry Division as part of Operation Plunder, were among the first British troops to cross the River Rhine, in the Xanten area. The battalion was still in the area when VE-Day came soon after.

It was disbanded in June 1945. The Hackney's were revived as 648th Heavy Anti-Aircraft Regiment, Royal Artillery in 1947, before finally being disbanded in 1955.

=== World War One - Home Front ===
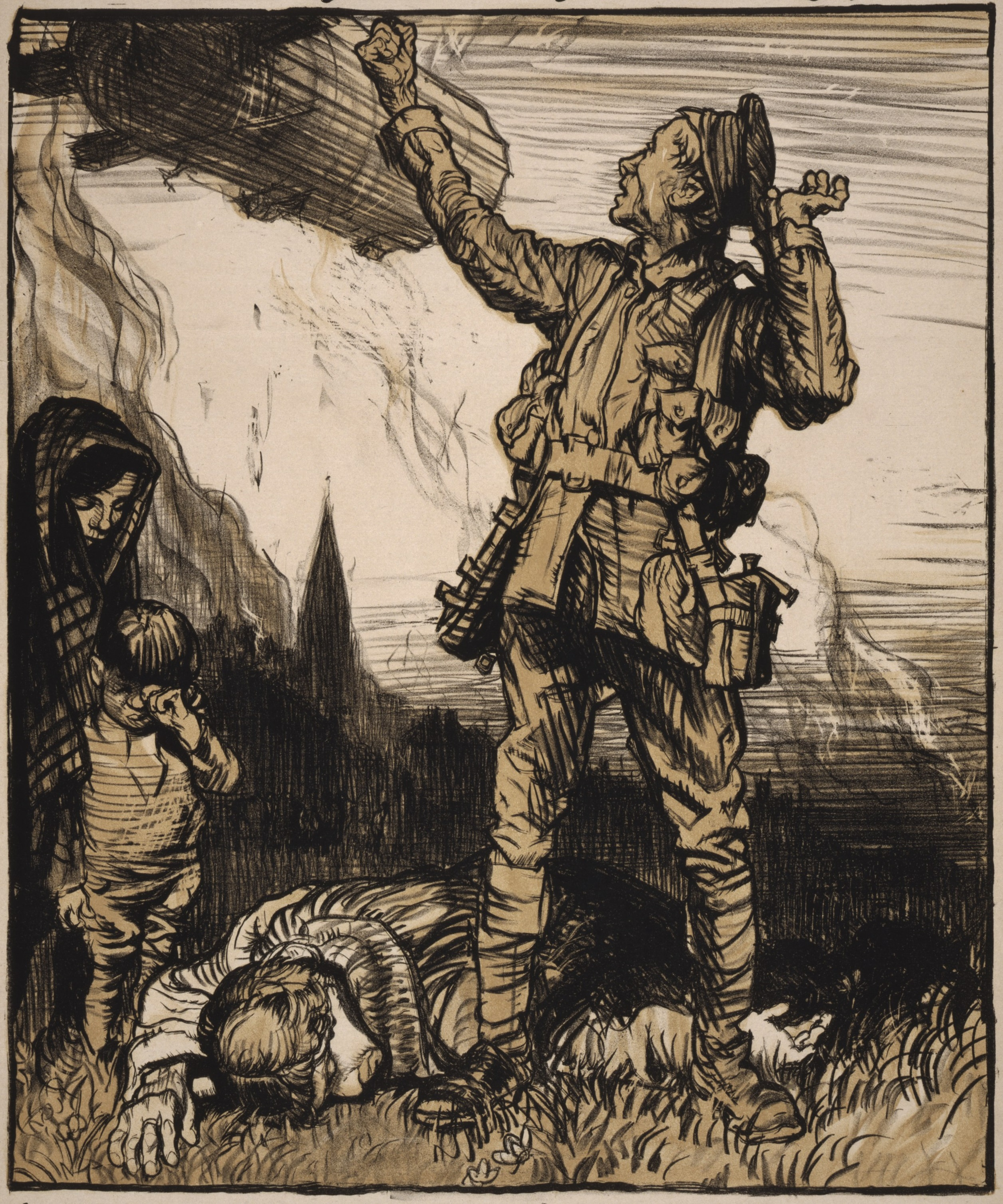
During World War One, deaths of women, children and the elderly in air raids shocked the public. (Daily Chronicle cartoon by Frank Brangwyn)

The first bomb of the first air raid on London, fell on 16 Alkham Road, West Hackney, in May 1915 by the German Army airship LZ 38. No one was seriously hurt at that address but 2 people, Henry Good, a 49 year old labourer, and his wife Caroline were found burnt to death in Balls Pond Road, Hackney. It was widely reported that the couple were found kneeling, as though in prayer and the Henry Good's arm lay round his wife's waist. Five people were killed elsewhere in London, including four children, causing great anger among the public. East London was at particular risk at this time, due to the Kaiser's order, later rescinded, that the raiders limit their attacks to targets east of the Tower of London.

=== World War Two - Home Front ===
During the Second World War, Hackney was badly affected by wartime bombing that left the area with 749 civilian war dead, with many more of its citizens injured or left homeless. Many other Hackney residents were also killed on active service around the world. The number of devices hitting Hackney was upwards of 613 high explosive bombs, 16 parachute mines, 37 V-1 'doodlebugs', 10 V-2 rockets and many thousands of 1 kg incendiary devices.

Notable buildings destroyed by bombing included Tudor-era Brooke House in Upper Clapton and West Hackney church.

=== Post-war and Olympic Games ===
The post-war period saw extensive re-building, and the area became increasingly multi-cultural in character. During the 1930s, 1940s and 1960s the area's large Jewish and other minority populations made it a target for provocative rallies by Oswald Mosley and the far-right organisations he founded. These were actively opposed by many local people, together with organisations such as the 43 Group and this led to a number of violent confrontations, notably in the Ridley Road area of Dalston.

Hackney was one of the host areas when London staged the 2012 Olympic and Paralympic Games, with three venues falling within its part of the Queen Elizabeth Olympic Park:

- Copper Box Arena hosted events including Handball, Modern Pentathlon and Goalball. This 7,000 seat multi-sport venue is still used for community and elite sport.
- The Riverbank Arena was a temporary venue that hosted field hockey during the Olympics, and Football 7-a-side and Football 5-a-side during the Paralympics.
- London Olympics Media Centre. The facility is still in use and now known as Here East.

=== Affordable housing ===
Hackney's solution to affordable housing has been able to put more of it on the market by making use of inclusionary practices. This district built a significant number of affordable units and subsidised them with market-rate units. In Hackney about half of the new units are affordable. In an effort to avoid displacing current residents, construction was completed in phases.

==== Gentrification ====
On the 3rd of April 2025, Trust for London reported that Hackney had one area that was 'gentrified' since 2012 and 2025 with the areas families are having less children and a drop in the black communities. According to Trust for London the average house prices in the 'gentrified areas' searing to 2.5 times than the average house prices during the time between 2012 and 2025 compared to 2 times the average price than the rest of London.

== Geography ==
The outline of Hackney's traditional boundary resembles a right-angled triangle with the right-angle in the SW and the Lower Lea Valley, running NW–SE forming the hypotenuse. The western boundary is based on the N–S axis of the Roman A10, though the sub-district of De Beauvoir Town lies beyond it, as do small areas of Dalston and Stamford Hill.

The district's southern boundary follows the Regents Canal–Hertford Union Canal in part, and for the remainder marches a little to the north of it, with Victoria Park also forming part of the southern boundary.

The highest points around Stamford Hill and Clapton Common are over 30m AOD, with the lowest areas being along the River Lea. The Hackney Brook was the largest natural internal watercourse, entering Hackney in the NW, at the foot of the southern foot of Stamford Hill and exiting in the south-east, however, this watercourse was fully culverted in the 19th century.

The boundaries of Hackney take in the sub-districts of Homerton, Dalston (including Kingsland and Shacklewell), De Beauvoir Town, Upper and Lower Clapton, Stamford Hill, Hackney Central, Hackney Wick, South Hackney and West Hackney.

The Lea and Hackney Marshes are underlain by alluvium soils, and the higher ground between Homerton and Stamford Hill is formed on a widening bed of London Clay. Brickearth deposits are within tongues of clay extending beneath Clapton Common, Stamford Hill and Stoke Newington High Street. The centre and southwestern districts lie on river terrace deposits of Taplow Gravel. The area around Victoria Park and Well Street Common lies on flood plain gravel.

It lies approximately 49 feet (15 m) above sea level.

== Open spaces ==
Open spaces in Hackney include:

- Clapton Common
- Hackney Downs
- Hackney Marshes
- Mabley Green
- London Fields
- Queen Elizabeth Olympic Park (part)
- Springfield Park and Spring Hill Recreation Ground
- Stoke Newington Common, originally known as Cockhangar Green, and part of Hackney rather than Stoke Newington proper
- Victoria Park (outside of Hackney, but forming part of the southern boundary)
- Well Street Common
- West Hackney Recreation Ground
- Millfields Park

== Transport ==
=== Rail ===
Hackney is served by six stations, including by the London Overground at Hackney Central railway station, and it is named after the central area of Hackney, as well as Hackney Downs. Central was open by the North London Railway opened as Hackney on 26 September 1850, to the east of Mare Street. It closed on 1 December 1870 and was replaced the same day by a station to the west of Mare Street, designed by Edwin Henry Horne and also named Hackney. This station passed in due course to the London & North Western Railway and later on to the London, Midland and Scottish Railway, which closed the entire North London Line east of Dalston Junction to passenger traffic in 1944. Downs was opened on 27 May 1872 when the Great Eastern Railway opened the first part of its new line from Enfield Town to Stoke Newington.

A pedestrian link between Hackney Downs and Hackney Central stations was opened in 2015 by London Overground Rail Operations. Until Hackney Central's closure in 1944, a passenger connection had linked the two stations. However, when Hackney Central re-opened in 1985, the footway was not reinstated and passengers transferring between the two stations were obliged to leave one and walk along the street to the other until the link was rebuilt.

Hackney Wick opened on 12 May 1980 by British Rail on the re-routed line which bypassed the site of the former Victoria Park station as part of the Crosstown Linkline.

In 1872, London Fields railway station was opened by the Great Eastern Railway. It closed in 1981 due to a fire, repairs were eventually carried out and the station reopened in 1986.

In February 2006, a Docklands Light Railway (DLR) report called Horizon 2020 was commissioned, which suggested that the DLR be extended to Hackney Central from Bow Church via Old Ford and Homerton, taking over the old parts of the North London Line to link up with Poplar and Canary Wharf.

=== Buses ===
Hackney is served by a large number of London Buses routes, 26, 30, 38, 55, 56, 106, 149, 236, 242, 253, 254, 276, 277, 388, 394, 339, 425 and 488 as well as the D6, and W15. Hackney is also served by the London night bus network with routes N26, N38, N55 and N253 all running in the area. Route N277 also serves here when the 277 route was withdrawn between Dalston and Highbury Corner and the N277 was retained.

== International relations ==
=== Twin towns – sister cities ===
Hackney's twin towns and sister cities include:

==== Active ====
- Suresnes, Île-de-France, France
- St George’s, Grenada

==== Inactive ====
- Bridgetown, Barbados
- Göttingen, Lower Saxony, Germany
- Haifa, Israel
