= Stamford Hill railway station =

London Overground station

Stamford Hill
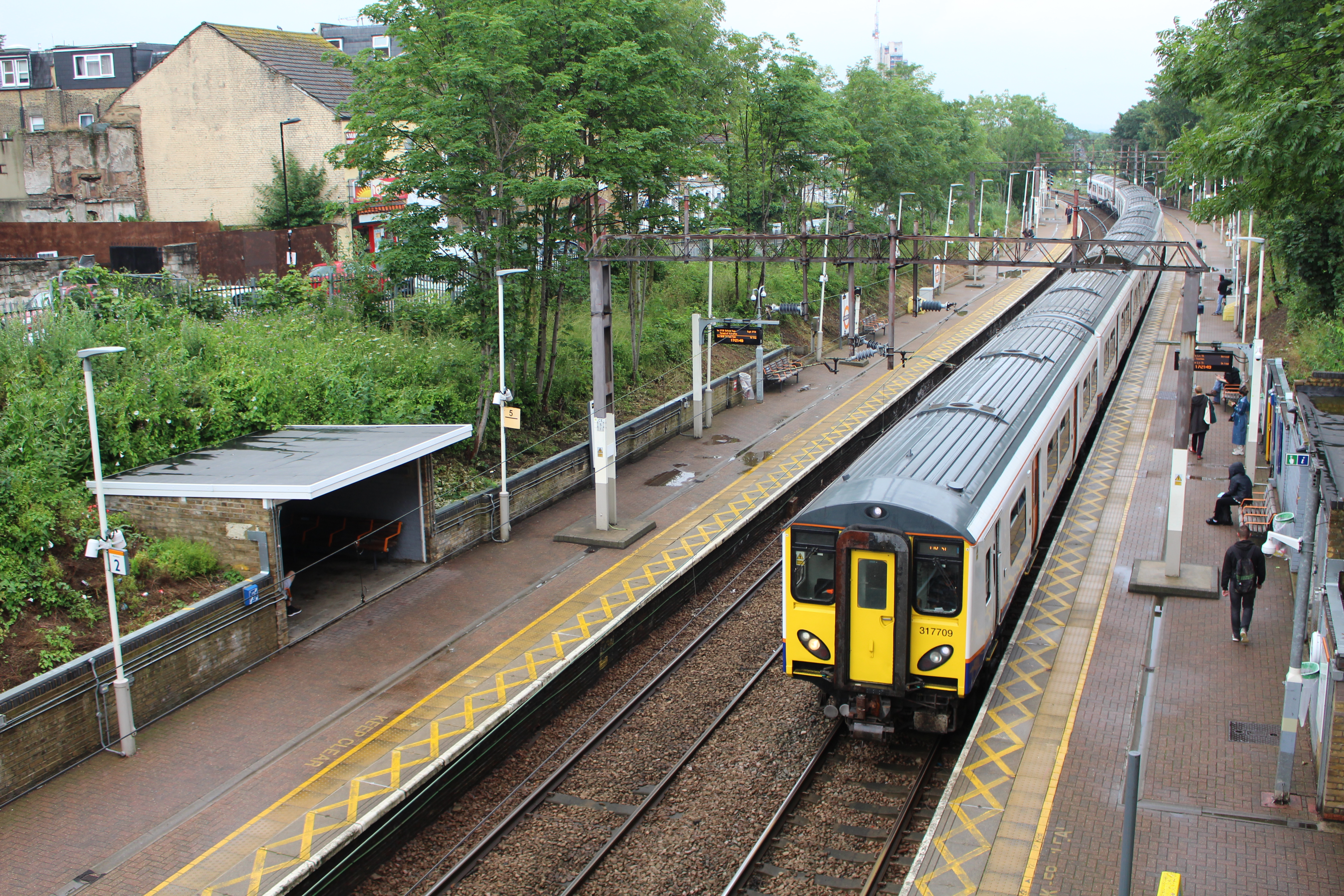
- A Class 317 arrives at Stamford Hill in June 2019
- Interactive map of Stamford Hill

General information
- Location: Stamford Hill
- Local authority: London Borough of Hackney
- Managed by: London Overground
- Station code: SMH
- DfT category: E
- Number of platforms: 2
- Fare zone: 3

National Rail annual entry and exit
- 2020–21: ▼0.218 million
- 2021–22: ▲0.431 million
- 2022–23: ▲0.524 million
- 2023–24: ▲0.696 million
- 2024–25: ▼0.676 million

Other information
- External links: Departures; Facilities
- Coordinates: 51.5742°N 0.0779°W

Stamford Hill is a station on the Weaver line of the London Overground, serving Stamford Hill and neighbouring areas. The entrance hall to the station, on Amhurst Park, lies within the London Borough of Hackney but much of the platform area is in the London Borough of Haringey. It is 5 miles 3 chains (8.1 km) down the line from London Liverpool Street and situated between Stoke Newington and Seven Sisters stations. Its three-letter station code is SMH and it is in London fare zone 3.

== Services ==
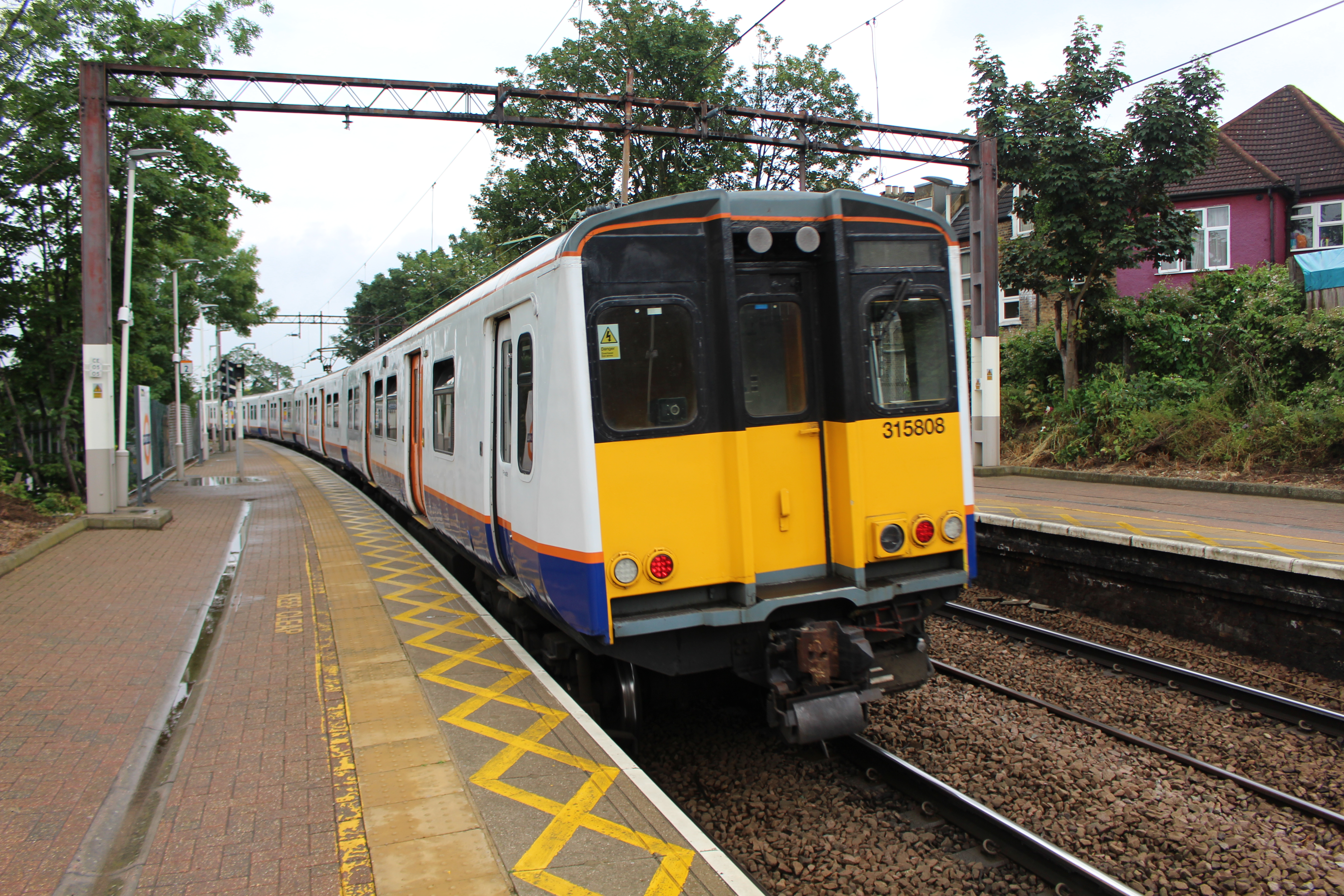
London Overground Class 315 at Stamford Hill in June 2019

All services at Stamford Hill are operated as part of the Weaver line of the London Overground using Class 710 EMUs. The station is on the Seven Sisters branch of the Lea Valley lines, with trains out of Liverpool Street running to either Cheshunt or Enfield Town.

The typical off-peak service in trains per hour is:

- 4 tph to London Liverpool Street
- 2 tph to Cheshunt
- 2 tph to Enfield Town

Additional services call at the station during weekday peak hours, with the Enfield Town service doubling in frequency to 4 tph each way.

Preceding station	London Overground	Following station
Stoke Newington towards Liverpool Street	Weaver line Lea Valley lines	Seven Sisters towards Cheshunt or Enfield Town

== Connections ==
London Buses routes 253, 254, 310 and night route N253 serve the station.
