= Kingsland, London =

Coordinates: 51.543°N 0.079°W

Kingsland
- Location within Greater London
- London borough: Hackney
- Ceremonial county: Greater London
- Region: London
- Country: England
- Sovereign state: United Kingdom
- Post town: LONDON
- Dialling code: 020
- Police: Metropolitan
- Fire: London
- Ambulance: London
- London Assembly: North East

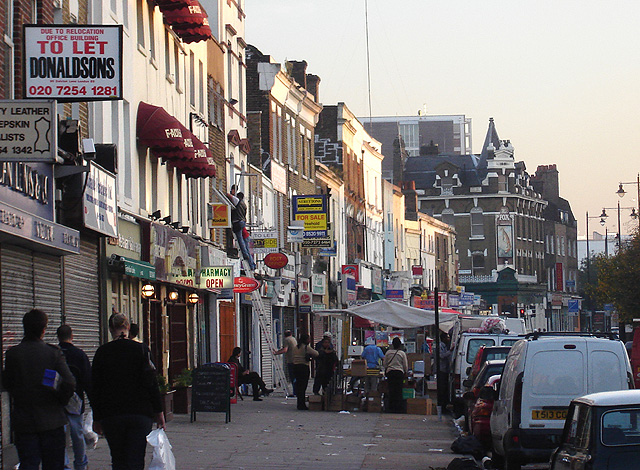
Kingsland Waste.

Kingsland was a small road-side settlement centred on Kingsland High Street on the Old North Road (the present A10), around the junction with Dalston Lane. It is no longer discernable as a separate settlement, though the historic street pattern remains. Since the opening of Dalston Junction station in 1865, the area has become known as Dalston, which was originally a separate hamlet further east. Historically part of the county of Middlesex, the area is within the London Borough of Hackney.

== History ==
=== Origins ===
A map showing Kingsland ward of Shoreditch Metropolitan Borough as it appeared in 1916.

A map showing the Kingsland ward of Hackney Metropolitan Borough as it appeared in 1916.

Kingsland derives its name from being the hunting grounds of a Tudor royal residence at Newington Green – hence King's Lands. At the time, the area was still heavily forested – as part of a forest stretching from Shoreditch to Enfield Chase – and roamed by wild bulls, stags and wild boars. Deforestation occurred quickly as the demands of the nearby City took wood for building and firewood, and the cleared land was quarried for brick clay. There were many wells and springs in the district. The (now lost) Pigwell Brook had its source on Kingsland Green and followed the line of the modern Graham Road, before joining Hackney Brook in the region of Church Street (now the Narroway). Another chalybeate spring beyond Dalston was tapped and its water piped to Aldgate in 1535.

The small villages of Kingsland, Dalston, Newington and Shacklewell were all situated within the Parish of Hackney and were grouped together for assessment purposes. Together they had only as many houses as the village of Hackney. In 1672, Kingsland had 28 householders assessed for hearth tax, but expanded rapidly in the 18th century, along the line of Kingsland Road, north of the junction, and by 1724 had five inns, compared to Dalston's two. The road was heavily trafficked, including goods wagons pulled by six or more horses, and this caused the road surface to deteriorate. The local parishes appealed to Parliament in 1713 for the right to set up a Turnpike Trust, to pay for the necessary maintenance. Gates were installed at Kingsland and Stamford Hill to collect the tolls. The village was still very rural, with market gardens established around the village. Large scale development began in 1807, again by the main road, and a new estate was created on Lamb farm, to the south and west of the junction. By 1831, building began along Dalston Lane, linking the two villages.

In his youth, Samuel Pepys lodged in the village, for a while with his brother Tom and his nurse, Goody Lawrence. Also, it is recorded that Pepys "used to shoot with bow and arrows" here in the 17th century.

Kingsland had a six-penny bath and a leper hospital, south of the green, also known as the 'Lock Hospital'. This was founded in 1280 by the City of London, as one of ten located on the main roads from the city. This continued until 1559 and the last case of leprosy in London. From 1549, the hospital was administered by St Bartholomew's Hospital, and treated other infectious diseases. After the Great Fire, St Bartholomew's no longer had the funds to support the Lock hospital, but patients were accepted if they could fund their own care – this continued until 1680, when again the main hospital was able to resume funding. By 1669, there were six wards, by then for women only – male patients were sent to Southwark. The hospital was rebuilt in 1720, but closed in 1760. The hospital had a chapel, dedicated to St Bartholomew. This was used, informally, as a chapel of ease, saving residents the walk to church at the parish church in Hackney. At the closure of the hospital, local people petitioned to keep the chapel open; it was never repaired and was in poor condition in the 1820s, being demolished in 1846.

=== Disappearing district ===
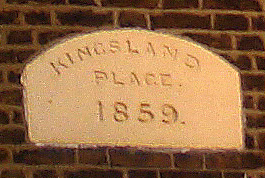
Before the railway came: This plaque, on a block of houses near the top of Kingsland Road, is from a time when the name could still be used with some confidence. (October 2005)

The main part of the village was located near Dalston junction where the road to Hackney left the main road, and today this is only commemorated by the name of Kingsland Shopping centre. However, the name of Kingsland is still seen in street and station names, and on some modern maps, but the district no longer appears on road signs as a destination. The various parts of the original district have now been absorbed into surrounding areas, for instance, the area of Kingsland to the east of Kingsland Road is now the ward of Queensbridge within the Borough of Hackney.

Before the arrival of the railways, in about 1850, Kingsland was the dominant village, which is why the section of the A10 road that is modern Dalston's main shopping centre is Kingsland High Street, and why Kingsland Road, not Dalston Road, extends south from the junction. Dalston was previously the name for a less important settlement situated further east, at the junction of Dalston Lane and Cecilia Road.

The North London Railway was opened in 1865, and adopted Dalston Junction as the name of the junction and new station – one of the most important on the line, since it connected directly with the City. Over time, the area round the junction became known by the name of the station – a common phenomenon in London.

== Transport and locale ==
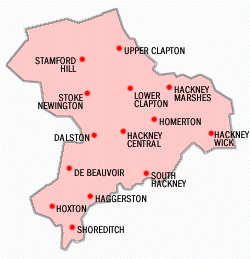
Districts within the London Borough of Hackney.

Opened in June 2010, the nearest London Overground stations are Dalston Junction and Dalston Kingsland

== Bibliography ==
- Bridget Cherry and Nikolaus Pevsner (1998) London 4: North. Penguin: London.
