= Shacklewell =

Coordinates: 51.554°N 0.072°W

- Location within Greater London
- London borough: Hackney
- Ceremonial county: Greater London
- Region: London
- Country: England
- Sovereign state: United Kingdom
- Post town: LONDON
- Dialling code: 020
- Police: Metropolitan
- Fire: London
- Ambulance: London
- UK Parliament: Hackney South and Shoreditch
- London Assembly: North East

Shacklewell is a small locality to the east of Roman Ermine Street (now the A10), in Dalston, Hackney, in the London Borough of Hackney.

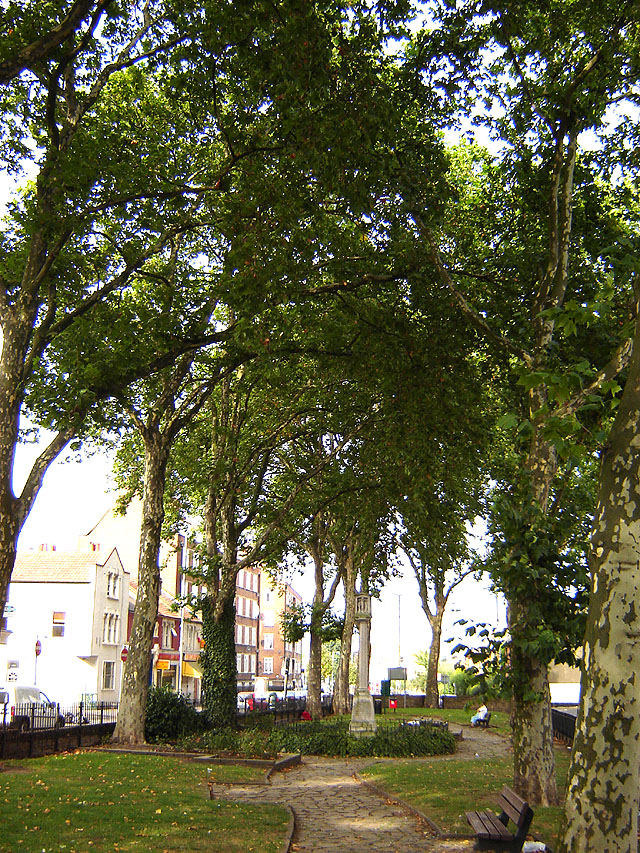
Shacklewell Green, an old village green encircled by modern London.

The area was originally a hamlet that developed on Shacklewell Lane in the Ancient Parish and later Metropolitan Borough of Hackney, now a part of the larger modern London Borough of Hackney. The place name is no longer commonly used, and the areas is now generally regarded as part of Dalston, which was originally a separate hamlet 500 yards to the south, and also part of the Parish and Borough of Hackney.

Shacklewell took its name from "some springs or wells which were of high repute in former days, but the very site of which is now forgotten."

== History ==
The place name was first recorded in 1490, when Thomas Cornish, a London saddler, had a tenant there.

The hamlet was one of four small settlements within the Parish of Hackney, (Dalston, Newington, Shacklewell, and Kingsland), which were all grouped for assessment purposes, together having only as many houses as the village of Hackney. The village of Shacklewell was settled on the eponymous village green, along Shacklewell Lane.

Shacklewell lay a little over 500 yards north of the hamlet of Dalston, which stood on Dalston Lane, with which it was linked by Cecilia Road.

John Heron, reputedly the richest man in Hackney, with extensive land-holding had his manor house at Shacklewell. Cecilia More, the youngest daughter of Sir Thomas More, the Roman Catholic martyr, married into the family in 1525. The house was later occupied by the Tyssen family, who owned large parts of Hackney.

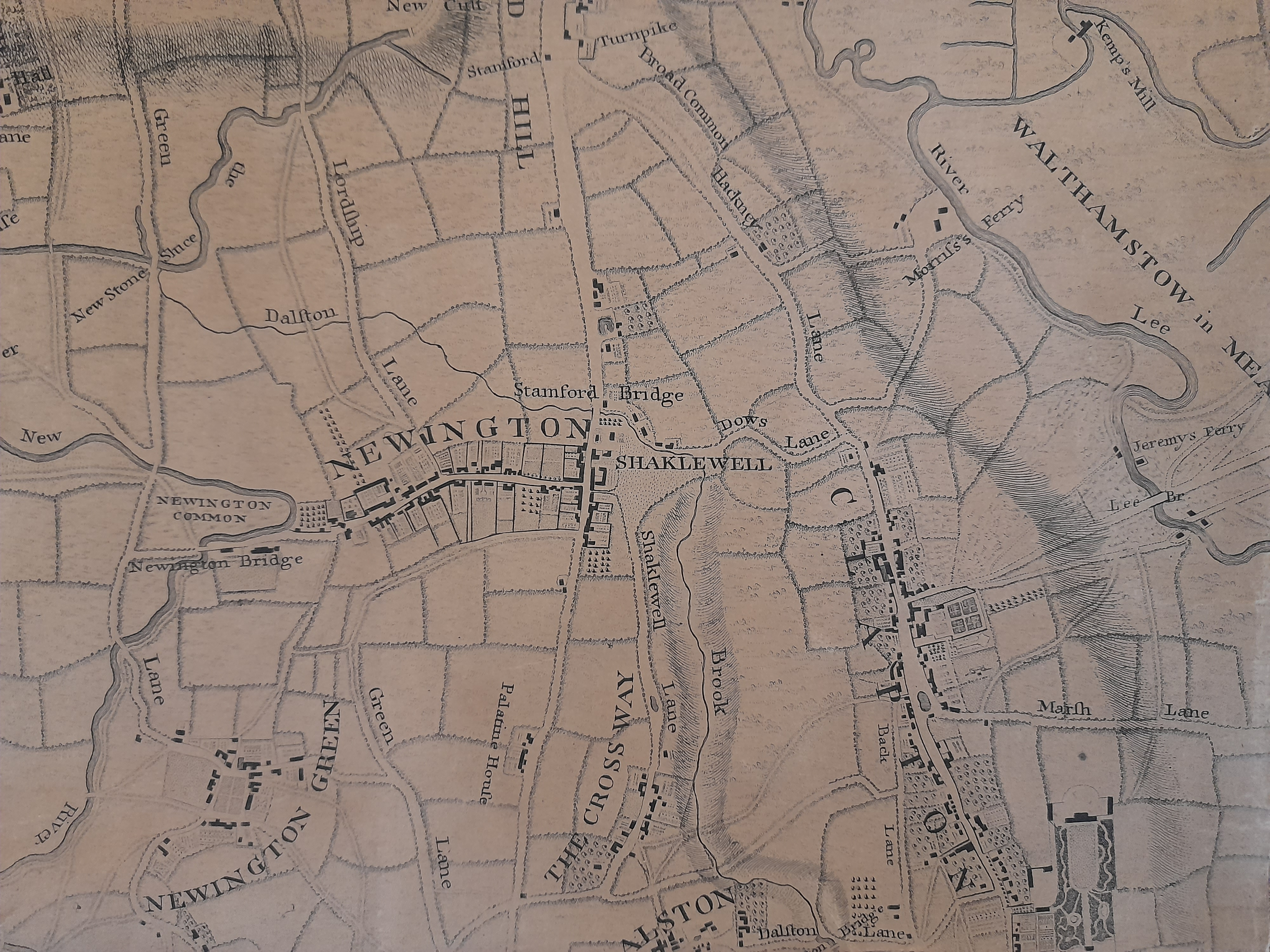
Shacklewell Lane on John Rocque's 1746 map of London.

Shacklewell Lane including its Green appear on John Rocque's 1746 map of London, however now shortened following subsequent development.

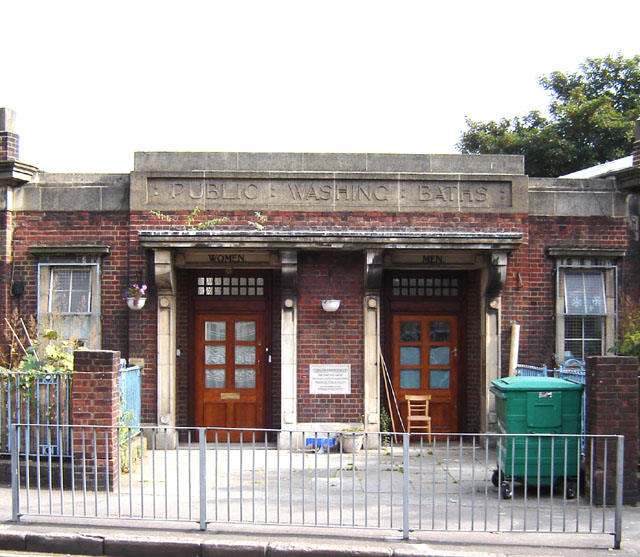
The entrance to Shacklewell Washing Baths, 2005.

One municipal building still standing is the former Shacklewell Washing Baths, opened December in 1931 by Councillor F. W. Snewin, Mayor of Hackney. This was one of a number of public communal bath and washhouses in Hackney. It had 24 baths for men and 16 baths for women, teak wood joinery and was of great importance to people living locally. Even into the 1960s, in some working-class areas of London many dwellings did not have their own bathrooms. It cost £11,127. The boiler rooms were rebuilt following bomb damage in 1940, reopening in March 1942.

Largely residential in the mid-19th Century, the district gained some light industry later on, including Eyre & Spottiswoode's printworks and a saw mill. Lloyd, Attree and Smith established 1857 built their sizeable modern factory at 18-28 Shacklewell Lane in 1899 on moving from the City. With fire doors and fire escapes it was licensed to hold up to 600 employees. The building became multiple occupancy workshops and studios after the company relocated to Londonderry in the 1970s. These were extensively modernised in 2025. Some clothing industry remained in Turkish hands during the 1990s until property prices increased and former workshops were converted to residential use. The area continues to change thus its not possible to assess its significance as a commercial centre.

Although the place name is now little used, the historic street pattern of the original hamlet remains.

Hackney Council's Town Clerk, John Sheffield replying to Home Office circular No.37/1951 regarding civil defence in the event of heavy bomb raids or atomic attack reported Shacklewell Lane's WWII A.R.P. Post 31 on Borough Councils open space behind Shacklewell House was still existent and could be returned to service.

== Growth and loss of sphere of identity. ==
During the 19th century the area was urbanising and local identities were more fluid than before or since. For some of this period, Shacklewell was informally considered to extend north into West Hackney to include Rectory Road and the northern end of Amhurst Road. It was sometimes also seen to extend west of Stoke Newington Road to include the most southern part of Stoke Newington.

That sphere of self-identification has been almost completely lost. It is no longer common for a Londoner to refer to themselves as living in Shacklewell, the only people to do so now living in the immediate vicinity of the village core, and these would normally also consider the area a part of Dalston. In its way the district is an illustration of the mutable nature of place names in the capital. The lack of a railway station using the name Shacklewell and the consequent omission of the name from railway maps of the capital will have contributed to the decline of the name.

== Electoral ward ==
There is a Shacklewell electoral ward for Hackney Council, which, as electoral wards require roughly equal electorates, corresponds only very roughly to the area after which it is named.

The post-2014 ward boundaries straddle Stoke Newington Road, with the village core and its immediate surroundings (now part of Dalston) to the east, while the area west of the road is the southernmost part of Stoke Newington

== Transport ==
The nearest London Overground station is the Dalston Kingsland railway station.

== Education ==
Primary schools in the area include Shacklewell School and Halley House, and the secondary school the Petchey Academy, located on the site of the former Kingsland Secondary School

== Entertainment ==
The Shacklewell Arms is a well known pub and live music venue.

== In popular culture ==
- In the book Career of Evil (2015) a murder in Shacklewell leads to the perpetrator being known as the "Shacklewell Ripper".

== Nearest places ==
- Dalston
- Hackney Central
- Stoke Newington
- West Hackney
