= Rectory Road railway station =

London Overground station

Rectory Road
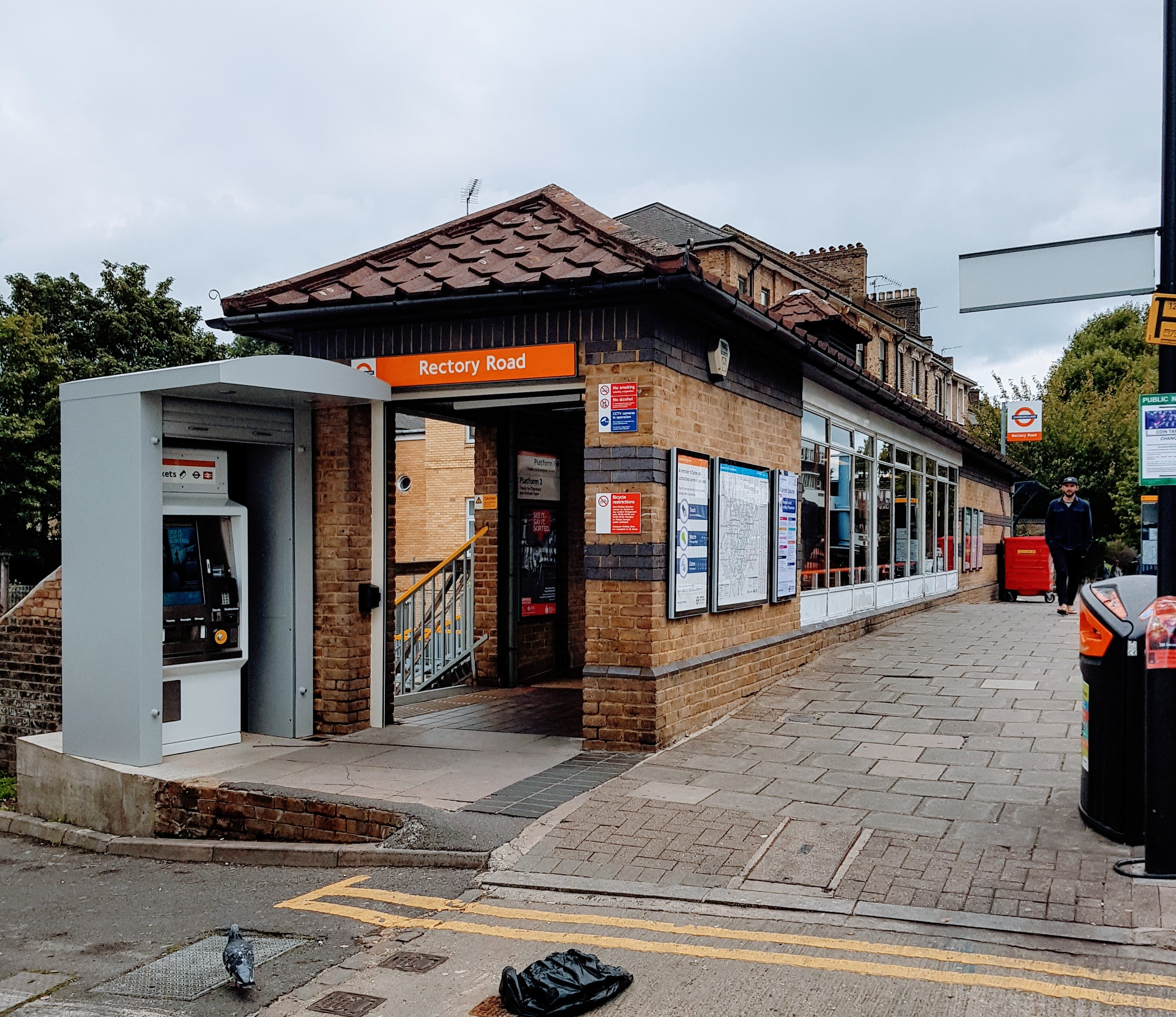
- The station entrance seen in September 2017
- Interactive map of Rectory Road

General information
- Location: West Hackney
- Local authority: London Borough of Hackney
- Managed by: London Overground
- Station code: REC
- DfT category: E
- Number of platforms: 2
- Fare zone: 2

National Rail annual entry and exit
- 2020–21: ▼0.258 million
- 2021–22: ▲0.616 million
- 2022–23: ▲0.900 million
- 2023–24: ▲1.273 million
- 2024–25: ▲1.326 million

Other information
- External links: Departures; Facilities
- Coordinates: 51.559°N 0.068°W

Rectory Road is a station on the Weaver line of the London Overground, located in the West Hackney area of the London Borough of Hackney, east London. It is 3 miles 64 chains (6.1 km) down the line from London Liverpool Street and is between Hackney Downs and Stoke Newington stations. Its three-letter station code is REC and it is in London fare zone 2.

== History ==
The ticket office, street buildings, staircases and platform shelters were all built in the mid-1980s in works funded by the Greater London Council (along with other stations in the "Tube-less" borough of Hackney). These elaborate structures were very different from the low-maintenance changes further up the line at the same time, and feature the British Rail logo worked into the brickwork at street-level.

In May 2015 the station and all services that call there were transferred from Abellio Greater Anglia operation to London Overground. The station was also added to the Tube map.

== Services ==
All services at Rectory Road are operated as part of the Weaver line of the London Overground using Class 710 EMUs.

The typical off-peak service in trains per hour is:

- 4 tph to London Liverpool Street
- 2 tph to Cheshunt
- 2 tph to Enfield Town

Additional services call at the station during the weekday peak hours, when the Enfield Town service is increased to 4tph.

Preceding station	London Overground	Following station
Hackney Downs towards Liverpool Street	Weaver line Lea Valley lines	Stoke Newington towards Cheshunt or Enfield Town
