= Stoke Newington railway station =

London Overground station

Stoke Newington
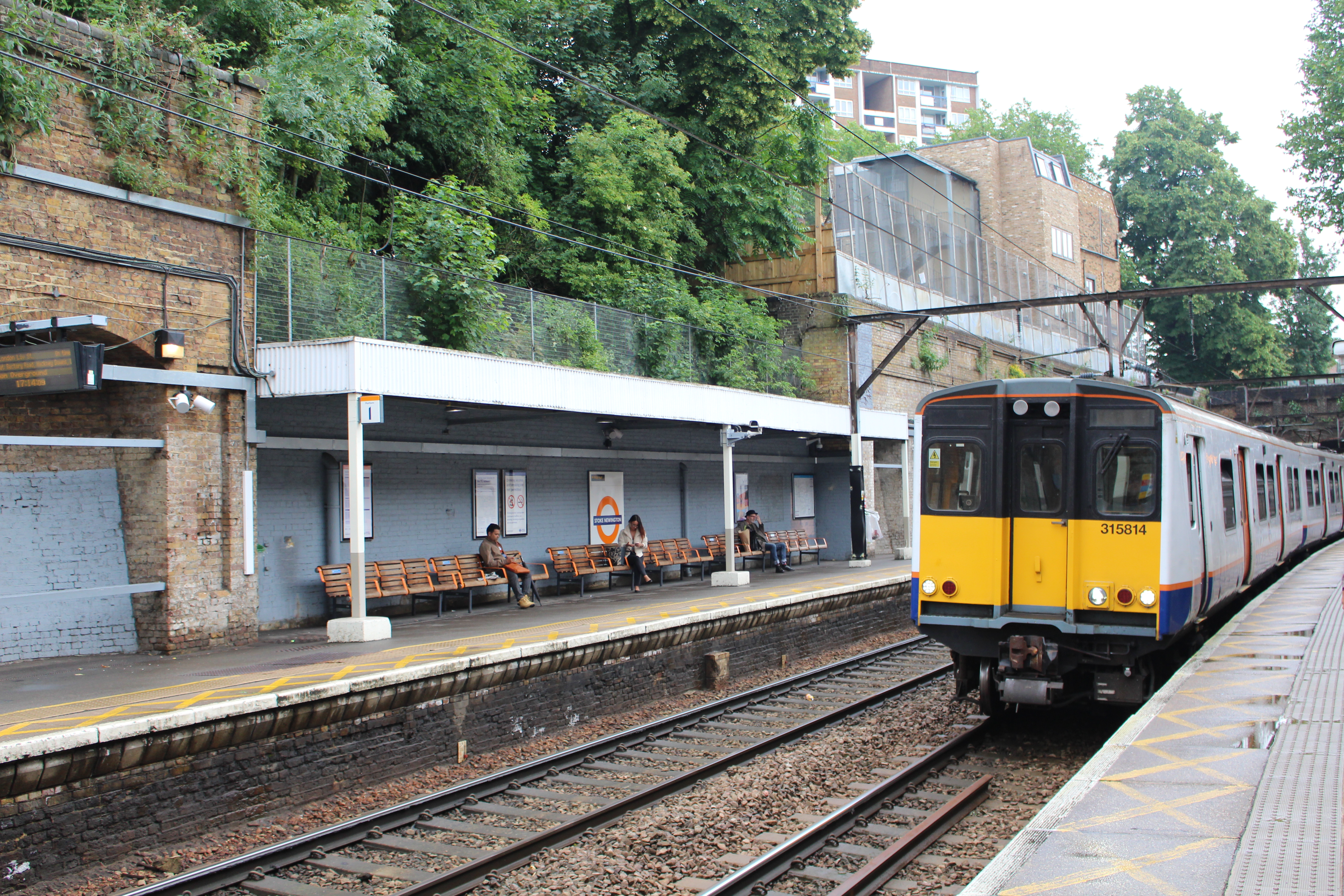
- Stoke Newington railway station in June 2019
- Interactive map of Stoke Newington

General information
- Location: Stoke Newington
- Local authority: London Borough of Hackney
- Managed by: London Overground
- Station code: SKW
- DfT category: E
- Number of platforms: 2
- Fare zone: 2

National Rail annual entry and exit
- 2020–21: ▼0.373 million
- 2021–22: ▲0.843 million
- 2022–23: ▲1.077 million
- 2023–24: ▲1.470 million
- 2024–25: ▼1.466 million

Railway companies
- Original company: Great Eastern Railway
- Pre-grouping: Great Eastern Railway
- Post-grouping: London and North Eastern Railway

Key dates
- 27 May 1872: Station opened

Other information
- External links: Departures; Facilities
- Coordinates: 51.565°N 0.073°W

Stoke Newington is a station on the Weaver line of the London Overground, serving the Stoke Newington area of the London Borough of Hackney. It is 4 miles 16 chains (6.8 km) down the line from London Liverpool Street and is situated between Rectory Road and Stamford Hill. Its three-letter station code is SKW and it is in London fare zone 2.

A smoked glass/steel-framed ticket office was built in the early 1980s to replace the original ticket hall on the same site. The platforms are located in a narrow cutting and are accessed by uncovered concrete staircases also installed at this time. In May 2015 the station transferred to London Overground operation and was added to the Tube map.

== Services ==
All services at Stoke Newington are operated as part of the Weaver line of the London Overground using Class 710 EMUs. The station is on the Seven Sisters branch of the Lea Valley lines, with services out of Liverpool Street running to either Cheshunt or Enfield Town in the north.

The typical off-peak service in trains per hour is:

- 4 tph to London Liverpool Street
- 2 tph to Cheshunt
- 2 tph to Enfield Town

Additional services on the Enfield Town route call at the station during the weekday peak hours.

Preceding station	London Overground	Following station
Rectory Road towards Liverpool Street	Weaver line Lea Valley lines	Stamford Hill towards Cheshunt or Enfield Town

== Connections ==
London Buses routes 67, 76, 106, 149, 243, 393 and 476 and night route N73 serve the station.
