= Zeppelin LZ 38 =

LZ 38
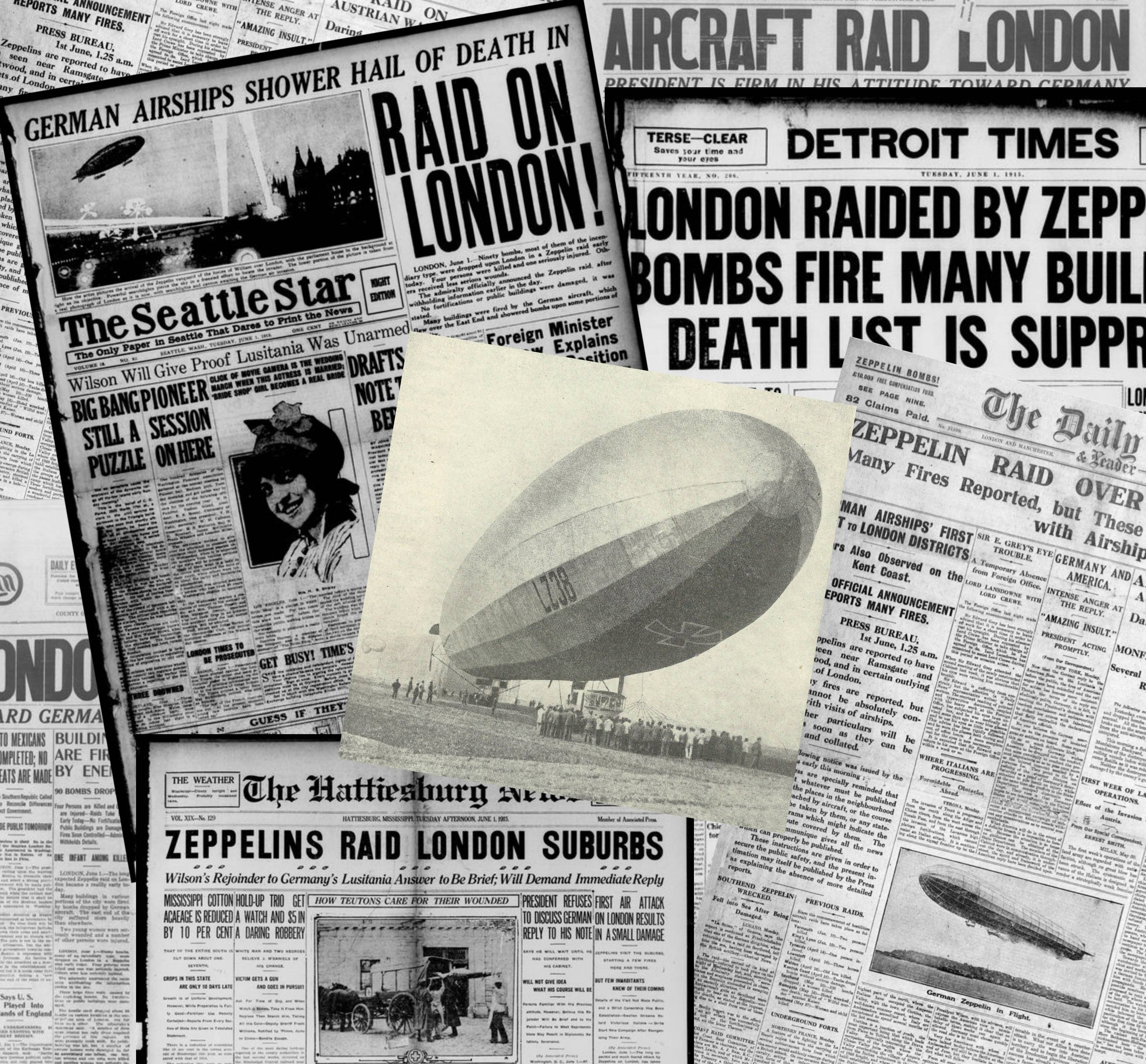
- Media coverage of the May 31 1915 Zeppeling LZ 38 bombing raid on London

General information
- Type: Transport airship, later refitted for bombing
- Manufacturer: Luftschiffbau Zeppelin, Staaken
- Owners: Imperial German Navy

History
- First flight: 3 April 1915
- Fate: 7 June 1915 destroyed in its hangar

Zeppelin LZ 38 (designated LZ 38) was Zeppelin P Class airship of the German Imperial Army. It was the first to bomb London, the capital of the United Kingdom.

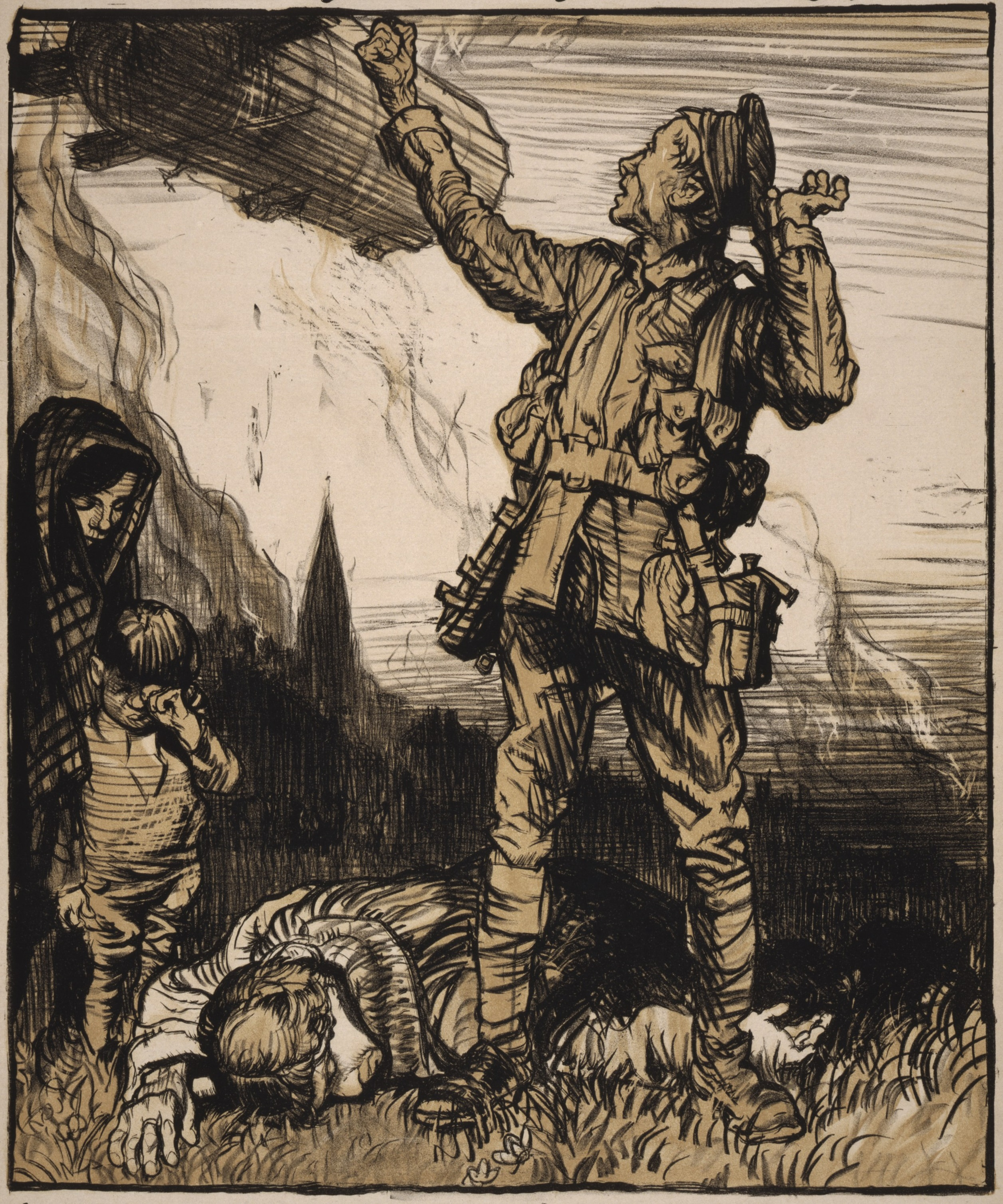
The zeppelin raid caused outrage in London and vows of vengeance as shown for this made for the Daily Chronicle by Frank Brangwyn.

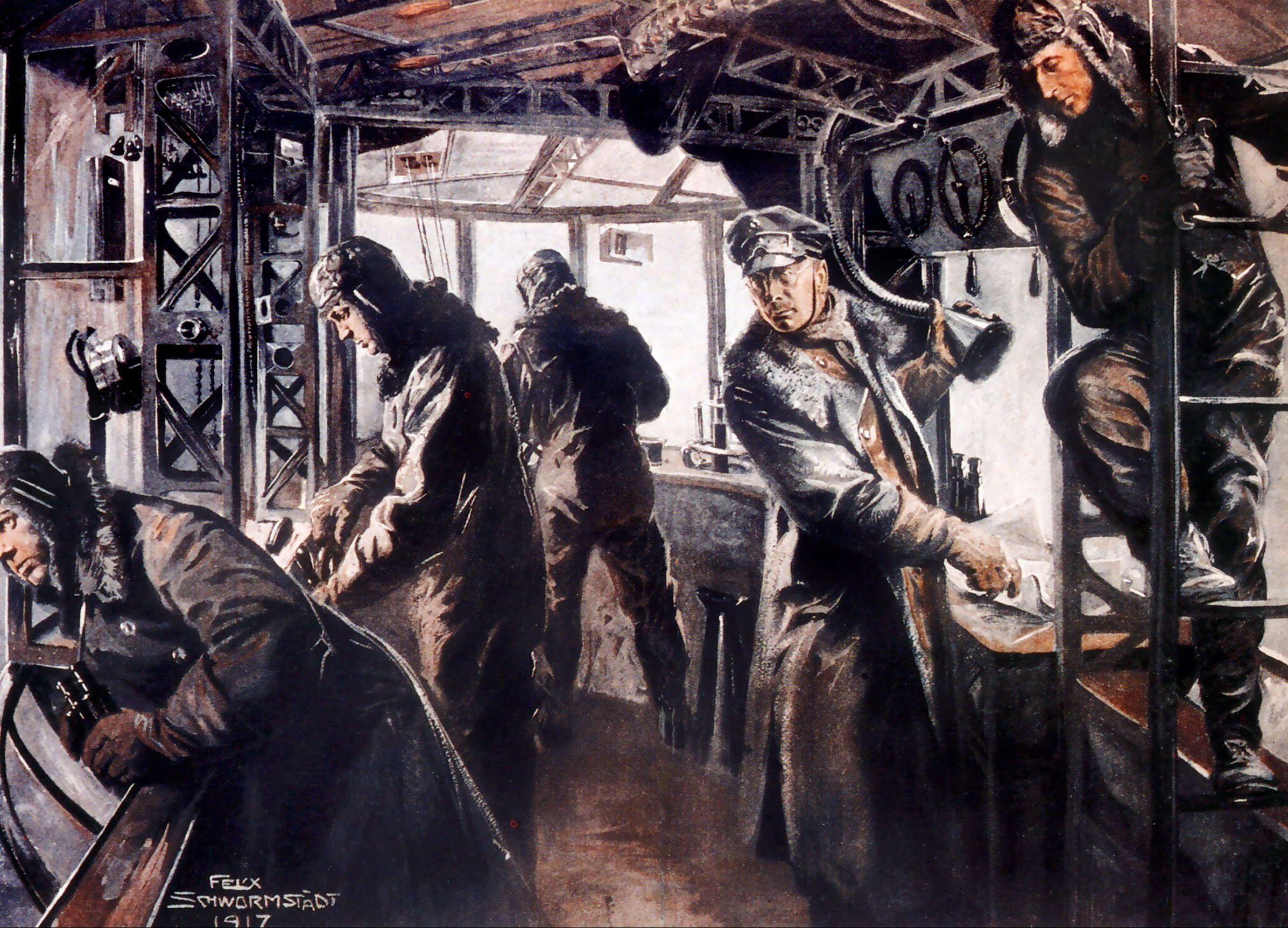
The control room of Zeppelin LZ 38 by Felix Schwormstädt

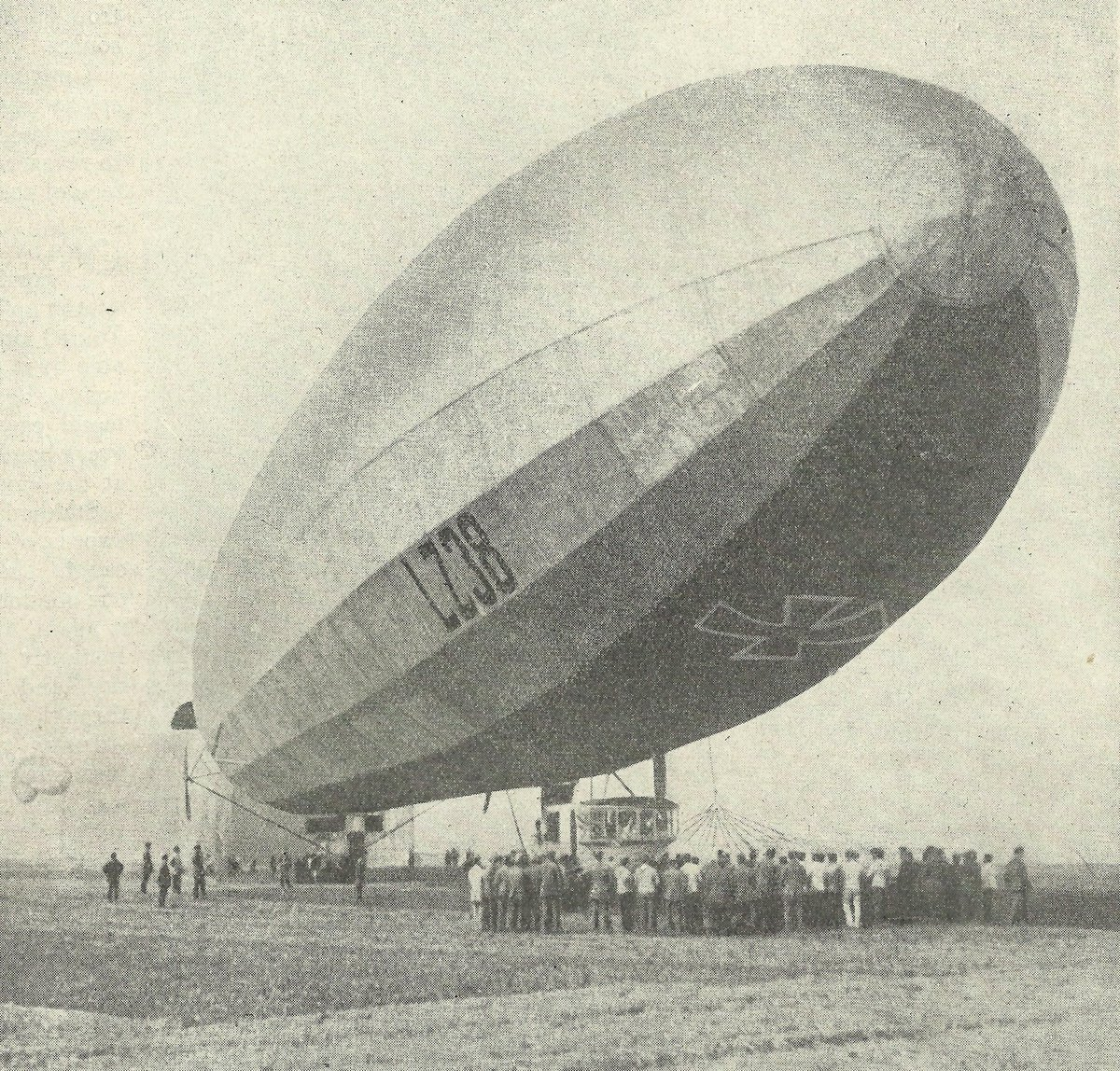
Zeppelin LZ 38 near its hangar

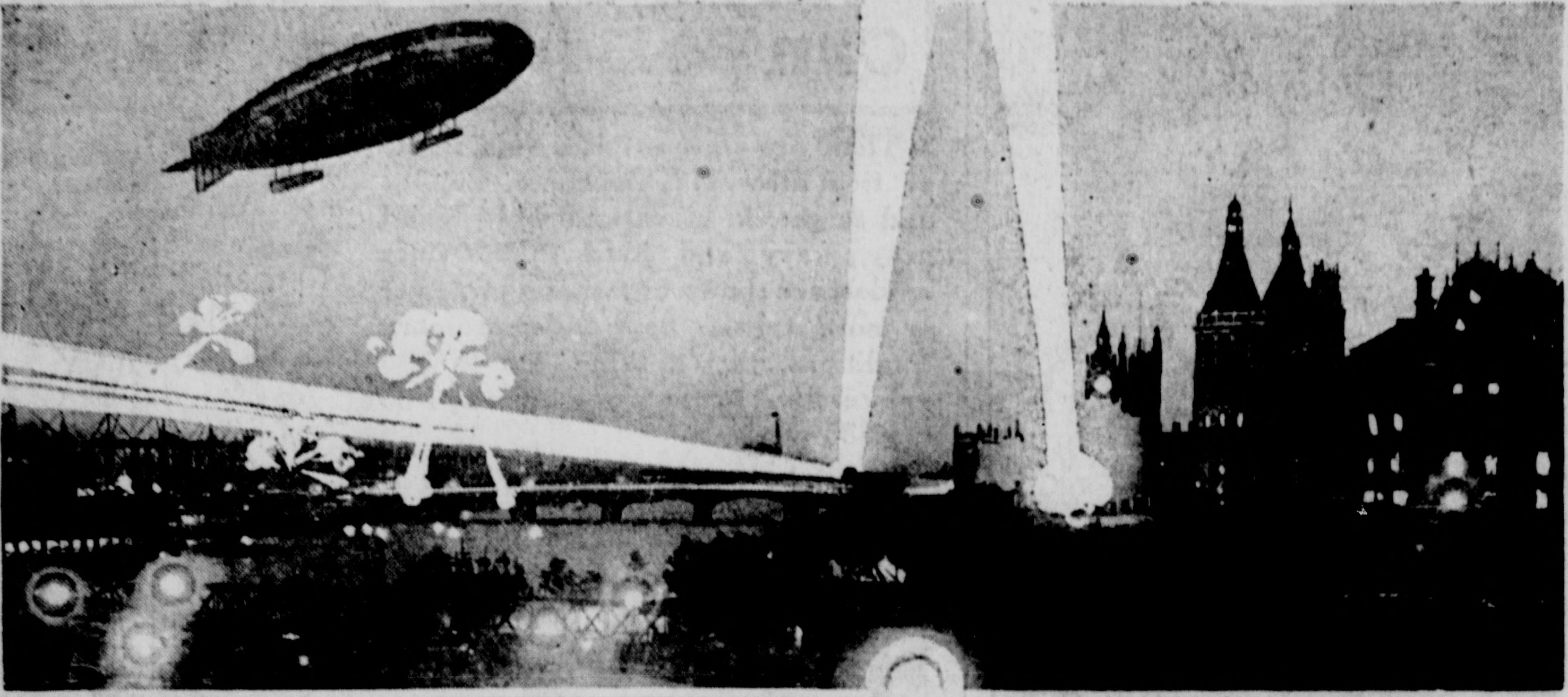
1st Zeppelin raid takes starts 11:00 PM May 31 1915. There is an 8-hour difference between Seattle and London. Yet the Seattle Star received news of the bombing and commissioned this picture for its June 1, 1915, Night edition

== Operational history ==
Airship LZ 38 was the first of the new P class, of which a total of 21 were built for the army and navy by the end of 1915. With a length of 163.5 metres (536 ft), the ships were the longest zeppelins to date. With this increase in size the diameter of the ships and their gas volume lift power also increased considerably. With this added lift the Zeppelin was then equipped with four engines.

The first P class Zeppelin constructed was LZ 38, assigned to the Army and first flown on 3 May 1915. LZ 38 was first used on the Eastern Front with the Königsberg and Schneidemühl locations and then moved to Düsseldorf and Brussels-Evere in early May 1915 for use in the West.

After a series of raids on the East coast of England it attacked London. In total it carried out five raids on England.

== May 31, 1915 Raid ==
LZ 38 became the first airship to bomb London on 31 May 1915, dropping 1,400 kilograms (3,000 lb) of bombs on an eastern suburb of London, killing seven people. A consequence of this raid was that reporting restrictions were introduced in England. Formerly press coverage contained detailed accounts of the location of bombing raids: after this, only generalised locations were published. The first bomb, an incendiary, was dropped on 16 Alkham Road. Moving south it dropped eight more bombs. Its ninth landed on 33 Cowper Road setting the house on fire killed 3-year-old Elsie Leggatt and her 11-year-old sister, Elizabeth May. The next incendiary set fire to 187 Balls Pond Road causing the death of a married couple, Henry and Caroline Good in the resulting flames. Steering away from the Tower of London, and, over Whitechapel LZ 38 dropped another explosive on Christian Street: 8-year-old Samuel Reuben and 16-year-old Leah Lehrman were killed. The seventh and last victim was Eleanor Willis, 67, who died of shock two days later. In total Zeppelin LZ 38 dropped 91 incendiaries, 28 explosive bombs and 2 grenades.

== Destruction ==
It was destroyed when its shed at Evere was bombed on 7 June 1915.

== Specifications (LZ55 / P-class zeppelin) ==
Data from Zeppelin : rigid airships, 1893-1940

General characteristics

- Crew: 18
- Capacity: 16,200 kg (35,715 lb) typical disposable load
- Length: 163.5 m (536 ft 5 in)
- Diameter: 18.7 m (61 ft 4 in) maximum
- Fineness ratio: 8.68
- Volume: 31,900 m^{3} (1,130,000 cu ft) in 15 gas cells
- Empty weight: 20,800 kg (45,856 lb)
- Fuel capacity: 4,800 kg (10,582 lb) maximum
- Useful lift: 37,000 kg (82,000 lb) typically
- Gas loading: 1.16 kg/m^{3} (0.072 lb/cu ft)
- Powerplant: 4 × Maybach HS Lu 6-cylinder water-cooled in-line piston engines, 180 kW (240 hp) each

(initially with 4x 157 kW (210 hp) Maybach C-X engines)

- Propellers: 2-bladed fixed-pitch propellers

Performance

- Maximum speed: 96 km/h (60 mph, 52 kn)
- Cruise speed: 90 km/h (56 mph, 49 kn)
- Range: 4,300 km (2,700 mi, 2,300 nmi) at 90 km/h (56 mph; 49 kn)
- Service ceiling: 2,800 m (9,200 ft) static

Armament
machine guns in hull-top positions and gondolas with provision for bombs

== See also ==
- List of Zeppelins

== Bibliography ==
- Brooks, Peter W. (1992). Zeppelin: rigid airships 1893-1940. Smithsonian Institution Press. ISBN 9781560982289. - Total pages: 221
- Castle, Ian (2020). "31st May 1915". iancastlezeppelin.co.uk. Archived from the original on July 1, 2020.
- Robinson, Douglas H. (1973). Giants in the sky: A history of the rigid airship Hardcover. University of Washington Press. ISBN 9780295952499.
