= Hackney Brook =

Coordinates: 51.5634°N 0.0884°W

The Hackney Brook is one of the subterranean rivers of London. Rising in Islington, it passes through Stoke Newington and Hackney, before emptying into the River Lea at Bow.

In its heyday, until the late 1830s, the brook was a substantial river, 10 metres wide in full flood at Stoke Newington and perhaps 30 metres wide at its junction with the Lea.

== Course of the river ==
Its course can be seen on some old maps .

=== Islington ===
The brook rose in two sources, both close to Holloway Road in Islington, in the vicinity of Arsenal's current and former stadia. It then passed along Riversdale Road immediately to the west of Clissold Park.

=== Stoke Newington ===
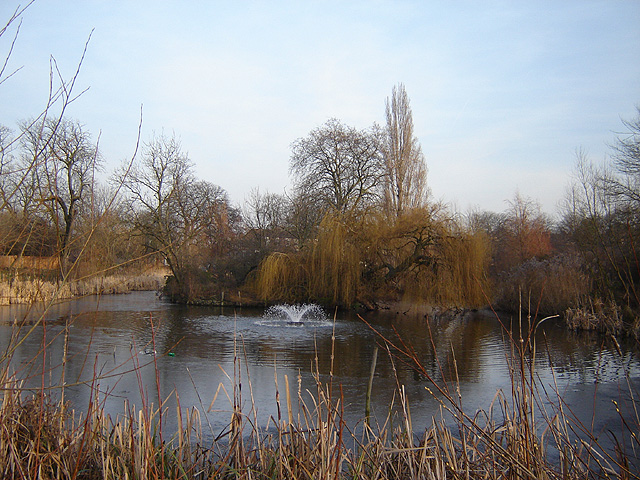
The eastern lake at Clissold Park, Stoke Newington, one of two that mark the original course of the Hackney Brook. It is, however, fed by mains water from the fountain seen here. (January 2006)

In Stoke Newington, the river ran through the northern part of Clissold Park, where its course is now marked by two lakes. It crossed the artificial New River, which flowed at right angles to the brook and left the park to the south (until the 1940s when the New River flow was terminated at the East Reservoir). The two Clissold Park lakes are now fed from the main water supply, not the brook.

It then wandered through Abney Park Cemetery. Isaac Watts used to enjoy spending time observing the island heronry on the Hackney Brook in the grounds of Abney Park, on which Abney Park Cemetery is today sited.

=== Hackney ===
On reaching the Roman Road known as Ermine Street (now known as Stamford Hill to the north of the brook, Stoke Newington High Street to its south) the brook reaches the border of Hackney, entering the Ancient Parish and later Metropolitan Borough that gave it its name.

The brook then runs along the north side of Stoke Newington Common which, despite the name is in the parish of Hackney rather than Stoke Newington; it was originally called 'Cockhangar Green', but this began to be dropped, and replaced with the more marketable current name as the area developed, a process completed in the 20th century. In the 1860s, at this point, builders found very early evidence of human occupation in the form of 200,000-year-old palaeolithic flint axes, which were being made on the banks of the brook. These are among the earliest human artifacts found in Britain.

From here, the brook followed the western side of Hackney Downs, then ran south-east to cross Dalston Lane and Mare Street in Hackney Central near Bohemia Place. Many 18th- and 19th-century illustrations show the ford here, which was at the bend in the road where the North London Railway bridge now crosses Mare Street.

In central Hackney, the brook was joined by the Pigwell Brook which flowed down from Dalston, roughly following the line of Graham Road. From Hackney Central it ran through Homerton, reaching Hackney Wick and turning south towards Bow.

Model of central Hackney in the early modern period, displayed at Sutton House. The brook is shown flowing left to right (west to east).

=== Old Ford, Bow ===
In Bow, the river ran south for a short distance, parallel to the Lea, before reaching Old Ford, where Victorian OS maps show a confluence with the Lea at a point immediately south of where a bridge now carries the Northern Outfall Sewer, and the Greenway footpath on top of it, across the River Lea.

The Northern Outfall Sewer crossing the Lea - looking north. The confluence of the Hackney Brook and Lea was just south of the later Northern Outfall Sewer (the path on top being known as the Greenway), on the left of the picture.

The location of the former confluence is opposite West Ham United's London Stadium on the eastern bank of the Lea (in Stratford, in the London Borough of Newham), and immediately north of Iceland Wharf, the location of the former 'old ford' across the Lea. The Old Ford which gave that area of Bow its name, and which was replaced by Bow Bridge further south which gave the whole of Bow its name.

== Disappearance ==
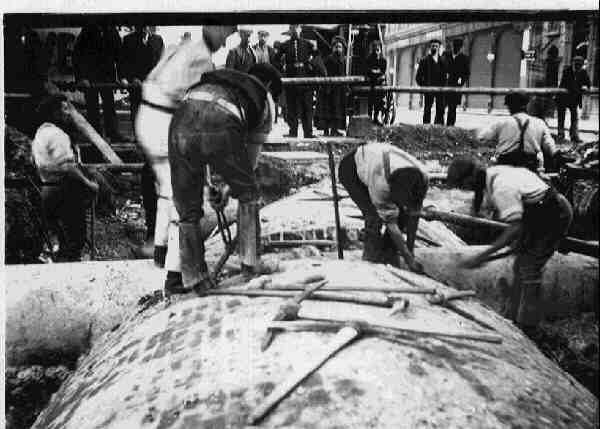
Workmen culverting Hackney Brook in Mare Street (c.1900)

Although much of the Hackney Brook had already been covered over by 1856, local population growth in the area had turned the open portions into little more than an open sewer. In response to this, the Metropolitan Board of Works constructed its northern high-level sewer in 1860 to a design by Sir Joseph Bazalgette to contain the brook and its many tributaries and help flush sewage towards processing plants in the east of London. The sewer followed the course of the brook as far as Hackney Church Street (now Mare Street), but then struck south to cross Victoria Park, joining the larger sewer network at Old Ford.

== Proposed deculverting ==
In 2016, Trevor ApSimon, a local organ-grinder, proposed restoring and deculverting the river from its source in Holloway to the Lea Navigation. Focusing on the reaches below Hackney Central, he called for the creation of a theme route, "encouraging citizens to stroll down from Hackney-on-High to Hackney-on-Sea on a Sunday morning." Hackney Green Party mayoral candidate Samir Jeraj supported the idea, but Tom Bolton, author of a guide to London's lost rivers, said the scheme was a complete non-starter.

== See also ==
- Subterranean rivers of London
