= Syd's coffee stall =

Coffee place in London

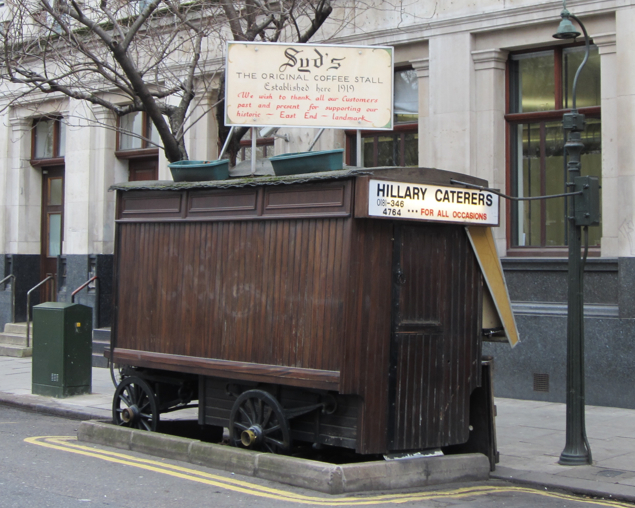
- Interactive map of Syd's coffee stall
- Location: Calvert Avenue, Shoreditch
- Coordinates: 51.5264°N 0.0777°W
- Built: 1919
- Built for: Sydney Edward Tothill
- Owner: Museum of London

Syd's coffee stall is a food cart which was located on Calvert Avenue, Shoreditch, in the London Borough of Hackney, and operated between 1919 and 2019. It was established by First World War veteran Sydney "Syd" Tothill in a specially built carriage and occupied the same site throughout its life. The carriage eventually received connections to the electricity, gas and water mains and, being unable to move, had kerbs erected around it when the road was resurfaced. Three generations of the Tothill family operated the stall before it closed on 20 December 2019. The owner, Jane Tothill, donated the carriage to the Museum of London.

== History ==
=== Early years ===
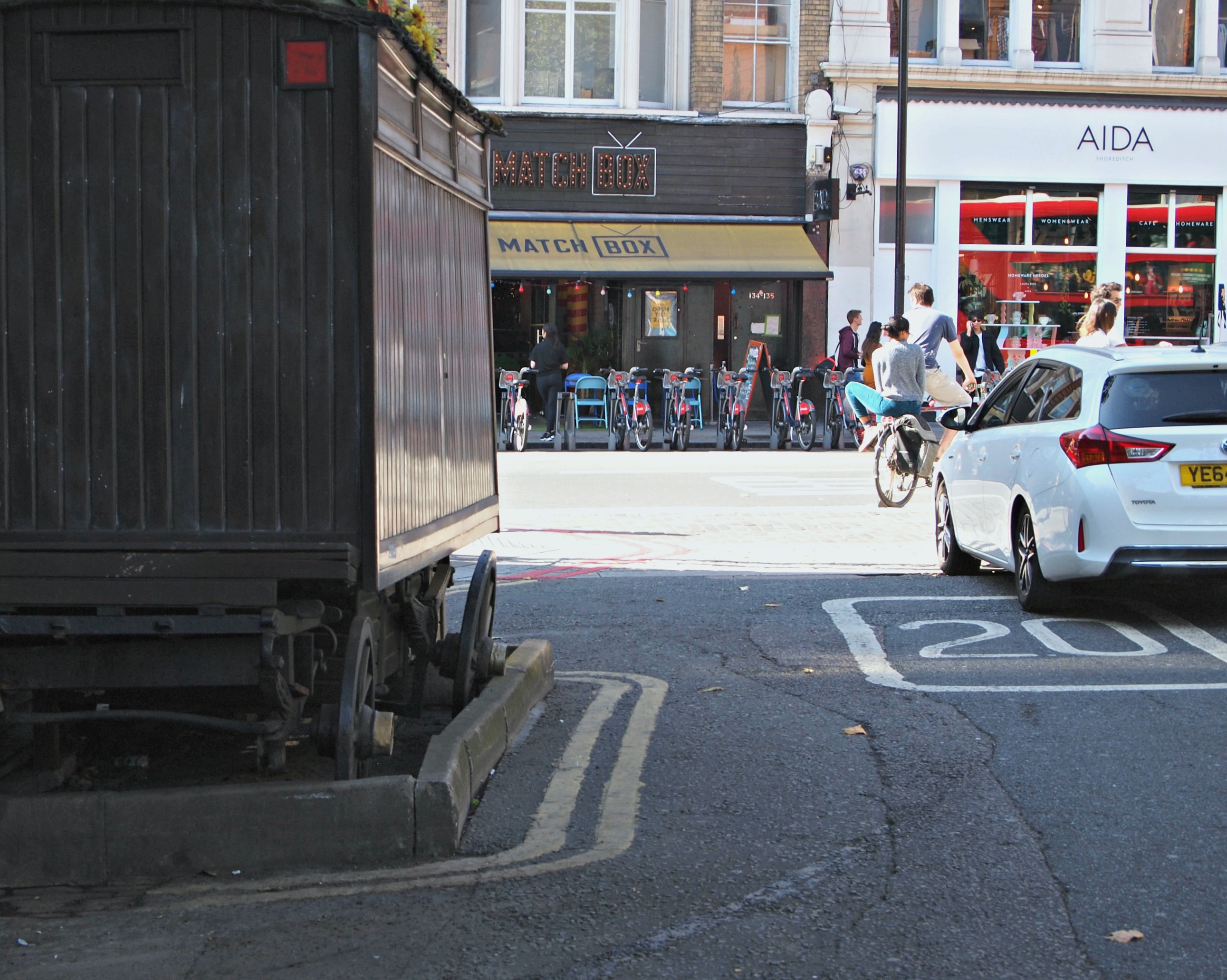
Viewed from Calvert Avenue looking towards the junction with Shoreditch High Street

The stall was established by Sydney Edward Tothill in 1919. Using money from his First World War soldier's disability pension he commissioned a carriage from a coachbuilder on Hackney Road, Shoreditch. The completed vehicle, in mahogany with etched-glass windows and brass fittings, was set up as a coffee stall on Calvert Avenue, near to the corner with Shoreditch High Street.

Although built as a carriage the stall remained in the same location throughout its life. The stall initially sold Camp Coffee, tea, cocoa and Bovex ("a poor man's Bovril") and snacks. The most popular food item was the "sav and a slice": a saveloy sausage (sourced from Wilsons German butchers in Hoxton), sliced bread and mustard.

The stall is said to have been the first of its kind to receive mains electricity when Syd tapped into a nearby lamp post in 1922. The lamp post has since been replaced but the mains feed to the stall remained, under licence from the local council. Gas and water main supplies were later introduced, replacing the original coal fire and water churn. In 1932 the stall featured in the film Ebb Tide, being removed to Elstree Studios briefly in 1931 for filming. It was rumoured that the British king of 1936, Edward VIII, visited the stall in disguise.

=== Second World War ===
During the Second World War Syd's coffee stall received a special licence to remain open during the hours of the blackout to provide refreshment to Air Raid Precaution wardens and emergency service personnel. During The Blitz a bomb fell on Calvert Avenue; the stall was protected from the blast by two London buses which had parked nearby but Syd Tothill's wife, May, was wounded by shrapnel. Owing to May's injuries Syd had a nervous breakdown and the running of the stall fell to their young daughter, Peggy. The Mayor of Shoreditch wrote to the War Office to appeal for the release of Syd's son, Syd Junior, to take over the stall. This was soon granted with Syd Junior being recalled from a secret mission with the Royal Air Force.

=== Later 20th century ===
After the war, Syd Junior continued to operate the stall which he expanded into an external catering business named Hillary Caterers after Sir Edmund Hillary who scaled Mount Everest in 1953. Syd Junior became the youngest ever president of the Hotel and Caterer's Federation and a freeman of the City of London. He was also the only caterer ever granted a licence to sell food on the steps of St Paul's Cathedral. In the 1960s, Calvert Avenue was resurfaced, its original 19th-century cobbles giving way to modern asphalt. Owing to the stall's utility connections it could not be moved and so the council erected kerbs around it and surfaced up to these. The original cobblestones can still be seen under the stall.

Syd Tothill's granddaughter Jane Tothill was the third and final member of the family to run the stall, doing so for the last 30 years of its operation. She claimed the stall was the oldest still operating in the whole of London. During its final years the stall was open five days a week between 5:30 am and 5:00 pm and its most popular snacks were ham or bacon sandwiches.

=== Closure ===
The coffee stall was established in a working-class part of the city but struggled with the gentrification of the area which brought new coffee bars. After the stall celebrated its 100th anniversary Jane Tothill announced that falling trade had forced its closure and it closed for the final time on 20 December 2019. Tothill also announced that she was donating the stall to the Museum of London. Hackney London Borough Council will assist with the relocation of the stall which will have conservation work carried out on it before going on display at the Museum of London's new premises in the former Smithfield Market from 2024. The curator of social and working history at the museum said that the stall is "an invaluable piece of our shared history as Londoners". The carriage was removed from the street on 11 January 2020.
