= Curtain Road Arts =

Studio and art project space in London

Curtain Road Arts was an artist-run project housed in an old furniture warehouse in Shoreditch, London, which functioned as a studio and an art project space. It was established in 1992 and was a centre for a great deal of activity in the 1990s. It included artists such as Glenn Brown, Alex Landrum, Dermot O'Brien, Anya Gallaccio, Cornelia Parker, Angela Bulloch, Stephen Hughes, Dan Hays, Mariele Neudecker, Debbie Curtis, Emma Smith and Michael Stubbs. Curtain Road Arts also housed The Agency Gallery.

Curtain Road Arts ended in 1999, due to rising rents in what was becoming the very fashionable Hoxton area. A number of the artists founded a similar smaller project called Mellow Birds, which ran until 2002.
