= The Clerk's House =

Historic house in Shoreditch, England

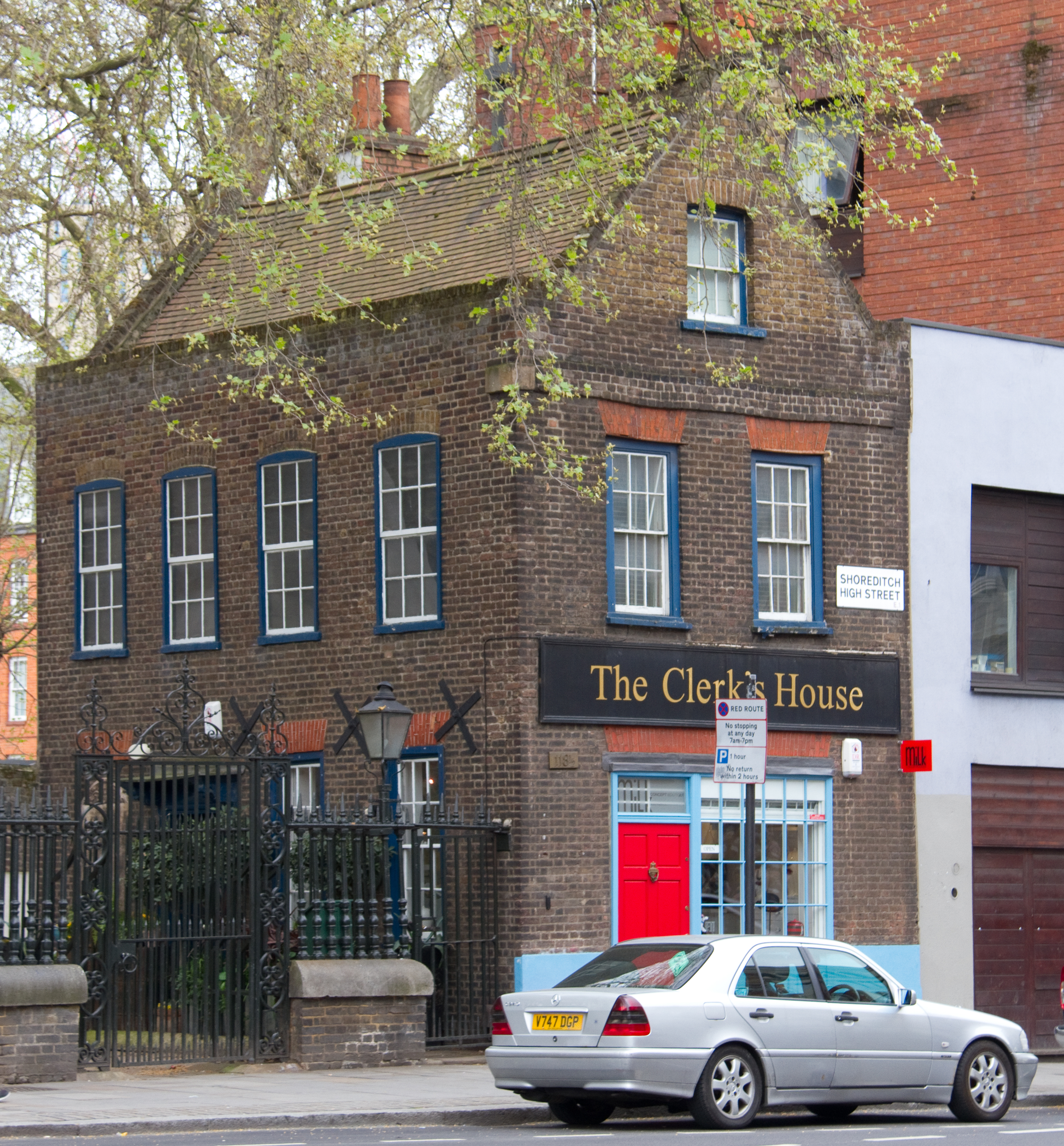
- The building in 2013
- Interactive map of the The Clerk's House area

General information
- Location: Shoreditch, England, United Kingdom, 118½ Shoreditch High Street
- Coordinates: 51.5267793°N 0.077758°W
- Completed: 1735 (291 years ago)

Technical details
- Floor count: 2

The Clerk's House is an historic building in Shoreditch, England. Standing at 118½ Shoreditch High Street, it is a Grade II listed building dating to 1735. It is two storeys, plus an attic and a basement. Part of its interior, such as some wood panelling, dates to the 16th century.

Believed to have formerly been a watch house, from which somebody looked out for body snatchers in the adjacent St Leonard's churchyard, the ground floor is now a business, while the upper floors remain residential.

In 2024, The Clerk's House in London's Shoreditch district became an exhibition space for Emalin, showcasing contemporary work in a historic interior.
