= Shoreditch =

Area of London, England

Coordinates: 51.526°N 0.078°W

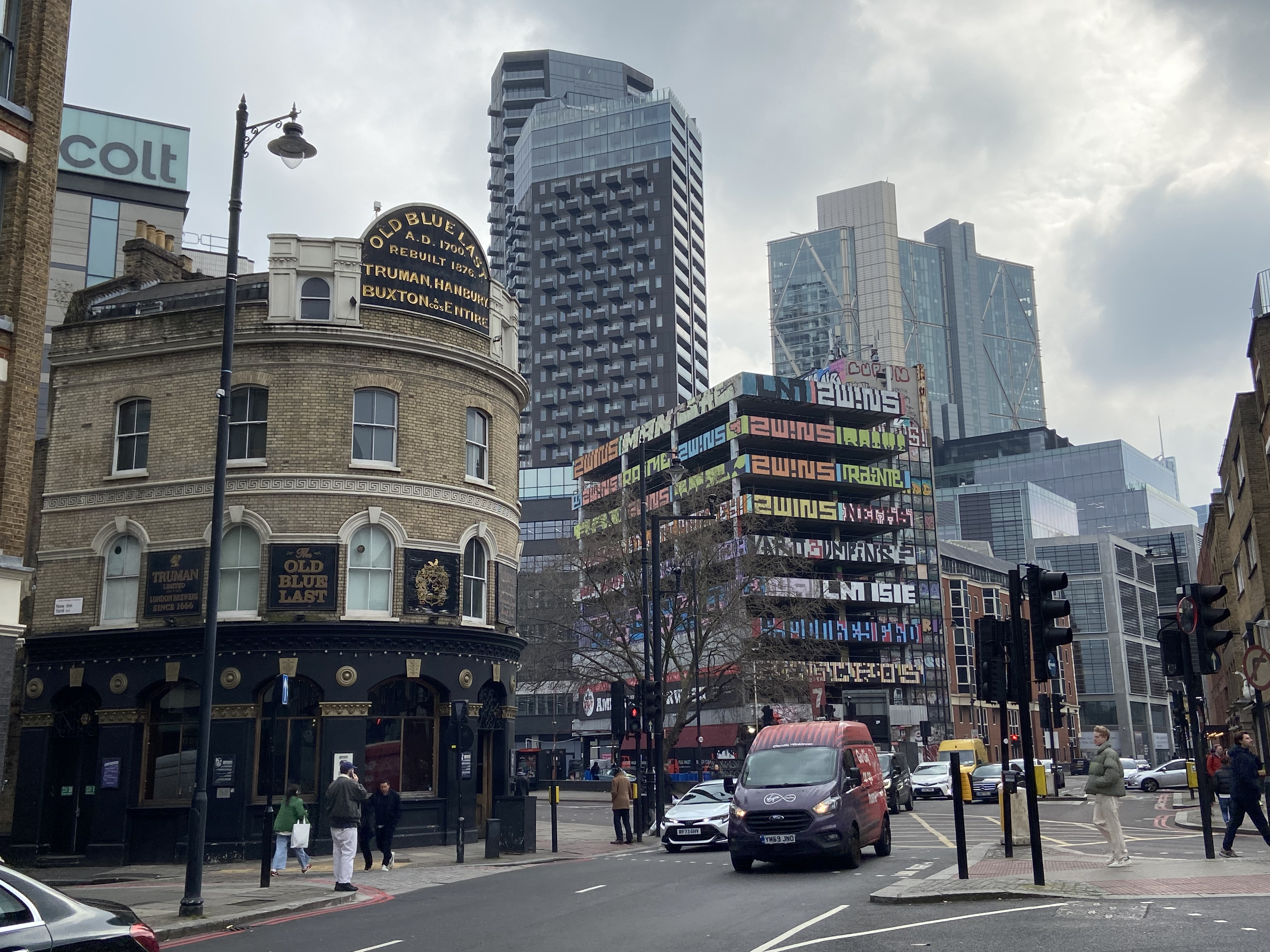
- Looking south on Curtain Road, Shoreditch

- Location within Greater London
- OS grid reference: TQ325825
  - Charing Cross: 2.5 mi (4.0 km) WSW
- London borough: Hackney; Tower Hamlets
- Ceremonial county: Greater London
- Region: London
- Country: England
- Sovereign state: United Kingdom
- Post town: LONDON
- Postcode district: EC1, EC2
- Postcode district: E1, E2
- Postcode district: N1
- Dialling code: 020
- Police: Metropolitan
- Fire: London
- Ambulance: London
- UK Parliament: Hackney South and Shoreditch; Islington South and Finsbury; Bethnal Green and Stepney
- London Assembly: North East; City and East

Shoreditch is an area in London, England and is located in the London Borough of Hackney alongside neighbouring parts of Tower Hamlets, which are also perceived as part of the area due to historic ecclesiastical links. Shoreditch lies just north-east of the border with the City of London and is considered to be a part of London's East End.

In the 16th century, Shoreditch was an important centre of the Elizabethan theatre, and it has been an important entertainment centre since that time. Today, it hosts many pubs, bars and nightclubs. The most commercial areas lie closest to the City of London and along the A10 Road, with the rest mostly residential.

== Toponymy ==
Early spellings of the name include Soredich (c. 1148), Soresdic (1183–1184), Sordig (1204), Schoresdich (1220–1221), and other variants. Toponymists are generally agreed that the name derives from Old English "scoradīc", i.e. "shore-ditch", the shore being a riverbank or prominent slope; but there is disagreement as to the identity of the "shore" in question. A suggestion made by Eilert Ekwall in 1936 that the "ditch" might have been one leading to the "shore" of the Thames continues to enjoy widespread currency. Other scholars, however, have challenged this interpretation on the grounds that the City of London lies between Shoreditch and the Thames. A variant spelling used by John Stow in 1598, Sewers Ditche, raises the possibility that the name might originally have referred to a drain or watercourse. Certainly the area was once boggy, and the name might bear some relation to the main branch of the Walbrook, which rose in Hoxton, ran along what is now Curtain Road, flowing past the former Curtain Theatre. The river was known in this area as the Deepditch, Flood Ditch or just The Ditch.

Folk etymology holds that the place was originally named "Shore's Ditch", after Jane Shore, the mistress of Edward IV, who is supposed to have died or been buried in a ditch in the area. This legend is commemorated today by a large painting, at Haggerston Branch Library, of the body of Shore being retrieved from the ditch, and by a design on glazed tiles in a shop in Shoreditch High Street showing her meeting Edward IV. However, the area was known as Shoreditch long before Jane Shore lived: the Survey of London, for example, lists some 26 deeds dating from between c. 1148 and 1260 which use some version of the name.

In another theory, also now discredited, antiquarian John Weever claimed that the name was derived from Sir John de Soerdich, who was lord of the manor during the reign of Edward III (1327–1377).

== History ==
=== Origins ===
The Parish and Borough of Shoreditch

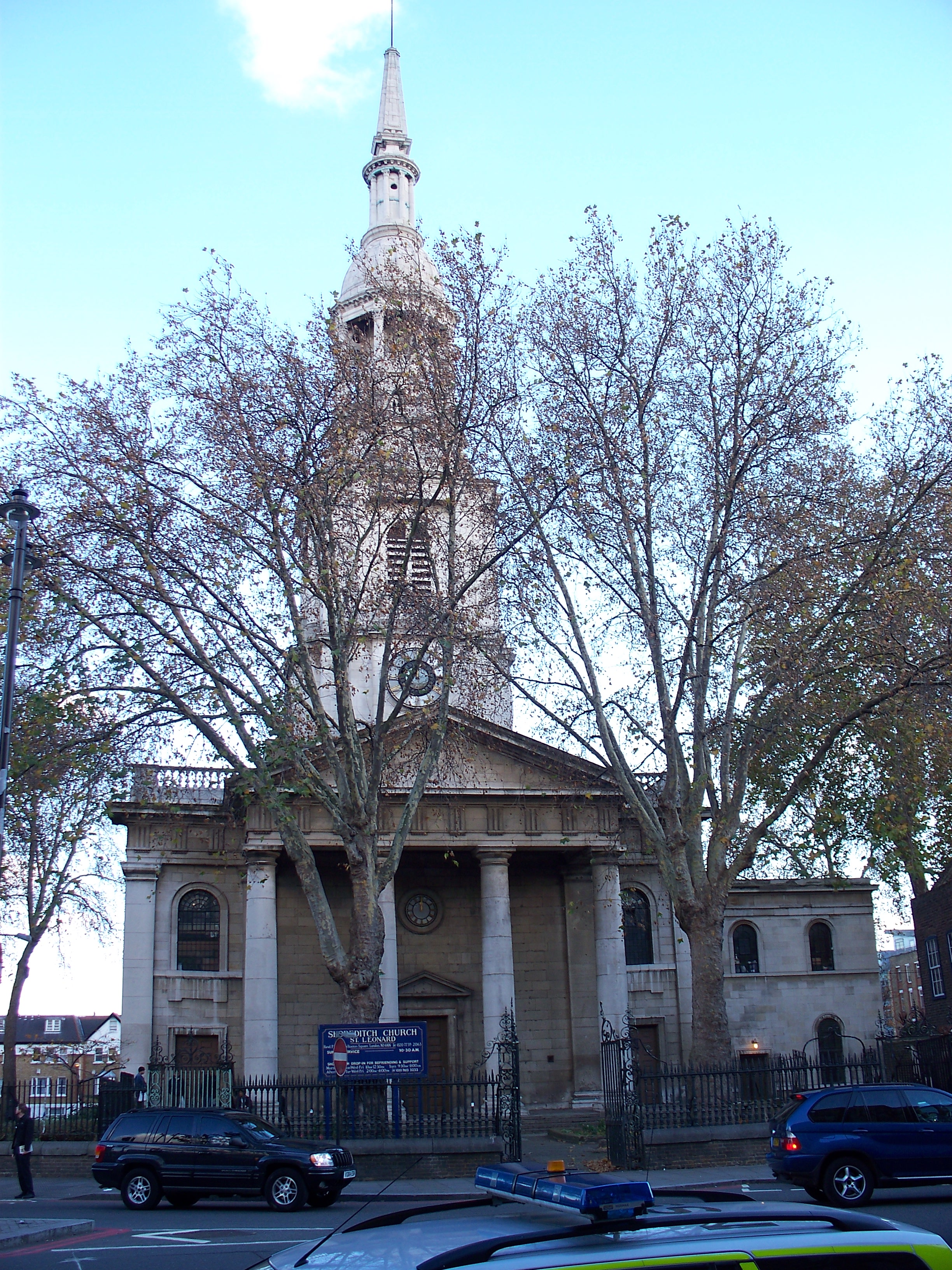
Shoreditch church

Though now part of Inner London, Shoreditch was previously an extramural suburb of the City of London, centred on Shoreditch Church at the old crossroads where Shoreditch High Street and Kingsland Road are crossed by Old Street and Hackney Road.

Shoreditch High Street and Kingsland Road are a small sector of the Roman Ermine Street and modern A10. Known also as the Old North Road, it was a major coaching route to the north, exiting the City at Bishopsgate. The east–west course of Old Street–Hackney Road was also probably originally a Roman Road, connecting Silchester with Colchester, bypassing the City of London to the south.

Shoreditch Church (officially known as St Leonard's, Shoreditch) is of ancient origin. It is featured in the famous line "when I grow rich say the bells of Shoreditch", from the English nursery rhyme "Oranges and Lemons".

Shoreditch was the site of a house of canonesses, the Augustinian Holywell Priory (named after a Holy Well on the site), from the 12th century until its dissolution in 1539. This priory was located between Shoreditch High Street and Curtain Road to east and west, and Batemans Row and Holywell Lane to north and south. Nothing remains of it today.

=== Shakespeare and the Elizabethan theatre ===
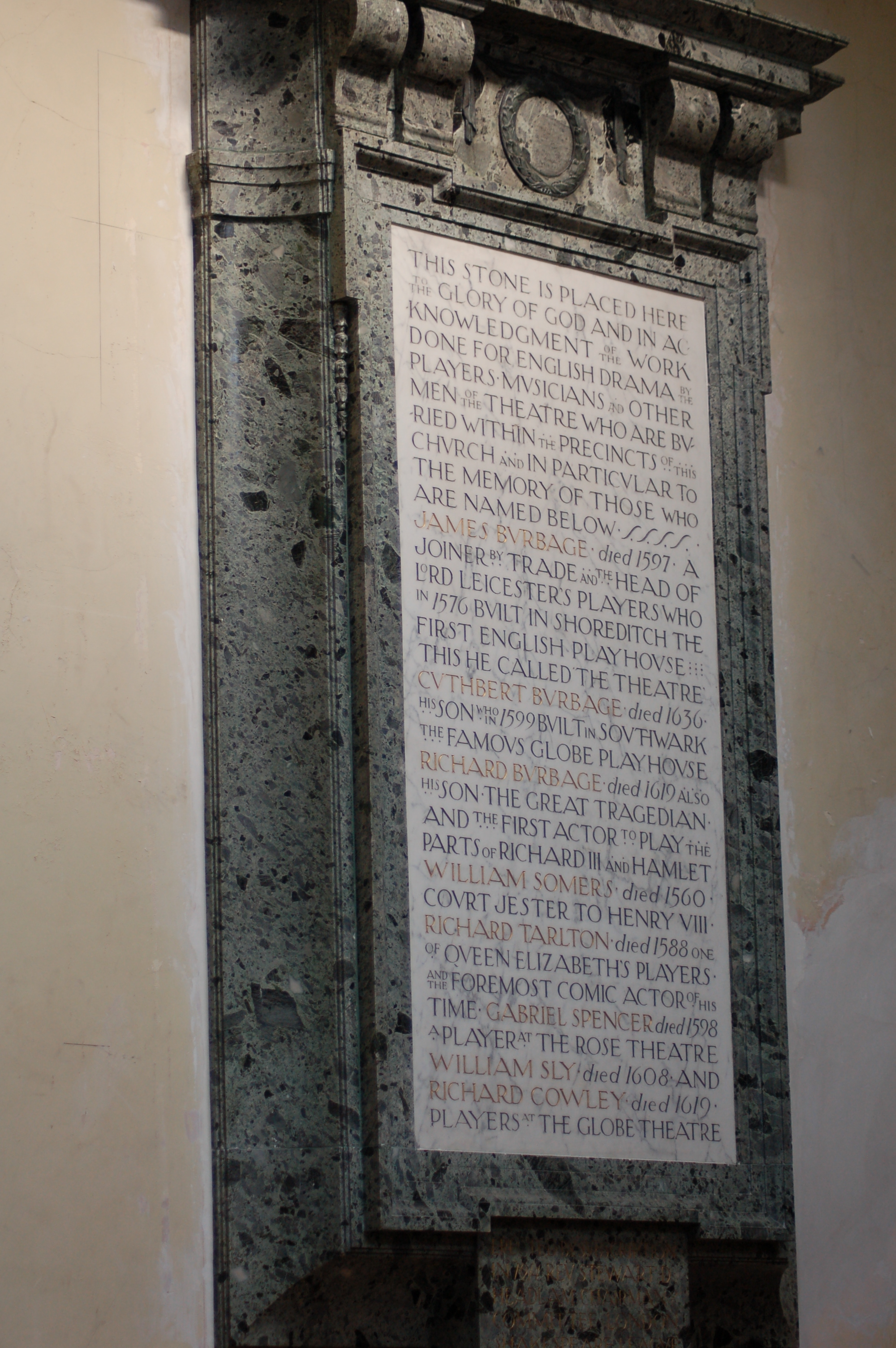
Memorial to Elizabethan actors buried in Shoreditch church

In 1574, the City authorities banned the building of playhouses in the City of London area. Consequently, theatres were built in the suburbs, beyond its jurisdiction.

The first of these came in 1576, when James Burbage built the first playhouse in England, known as "The Theatre", on the site of the Priory (commemorated today by a plaque on Curtain Road, and excavated in 2008, by MoLAS).

William Shakespeare lived nearby in a property overlooking St Helen's churchyard in the Bishopsgate Within area of the City. His early plays were first performed in Shoreditch, at The Theatre and at the nearby Curtain Theatre, built the following year and 200 yards (183 m) to the south (marked by a commemorative plaque in Hewett Street off Curtain Road). Romeo and Juliet was first performed here, gaining "Curtain plaudits", Henry V was performed within "this wooden O" and an early version of Hamlet was also first staged in Shoreditch.

Shakespeare's Company moved the timbers of "The Theatre" to Southwark at the expiration of the lease in 1599, in order to construct the Globe. The Curtain continued performing plays in Shoreditch until at least 1627.

The suburb of Shoreditch was attractive as a location for these early theatres because, like Southwark, it was outside the jurisdiction of the somewhat puritanical City fathers. Even so, they drew the wrath of contemporary moralists, as did the local "base tenements and houses of unlawful and disorderly resort" and the "great number of dissolute, loose, and insolent people harboured in such and the like noisome and disorderly houses, as namely poor cottages, and habitations of beggars and people without trade, stables, inns, alehouses, taverns, garden-houses converted to dwellings, ordinaries, dicing houses, bowling alleys, and brothel houses".

=== 17th and 18th centuries ===
During the 17th century, wealthy traders and French Huguenot silkweavers moved to the area, establishing a textile industry in Shoreditch, Spitalfields and surrounding areas. This industry is now commemorated by the name of the Weaver line railway which serves the area. By the 19th century, Shoreditch was also the locus of the furniture industry, now commemorated in the Museum of the Home on Kingsland Road. These industries declined in the late 19th century.

=== 19th century ===
In 1886, the parish of Holy Trinity, Shoreditch, was created to meet the needs of a growing population; the first vicar was the Anglo-Catholic priest, Arthur Osborne Montgomery Jay, son of William James Jay, chaplain to Duleep Singh. By 1889, Holy Trinity church, with a church hall and school, had opened on Old Nichol Street. Controversially, the church hosted a boxing club and gymnasium, which Father Jay saw as vital to reclaiming local men from street brawls. In 1894, the church opened a lodging house, Trinity Chambers.

In 1893, work began on building the Boundary Estate, as a slum clearance project.

=== Victorian entertainments ===
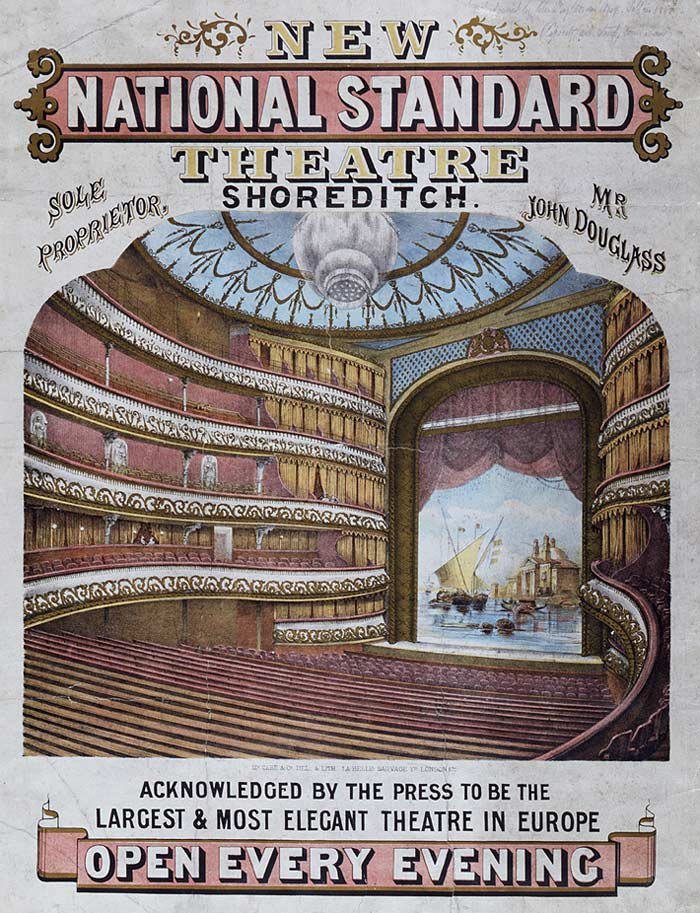
1867 poster from the National Standard Theatre

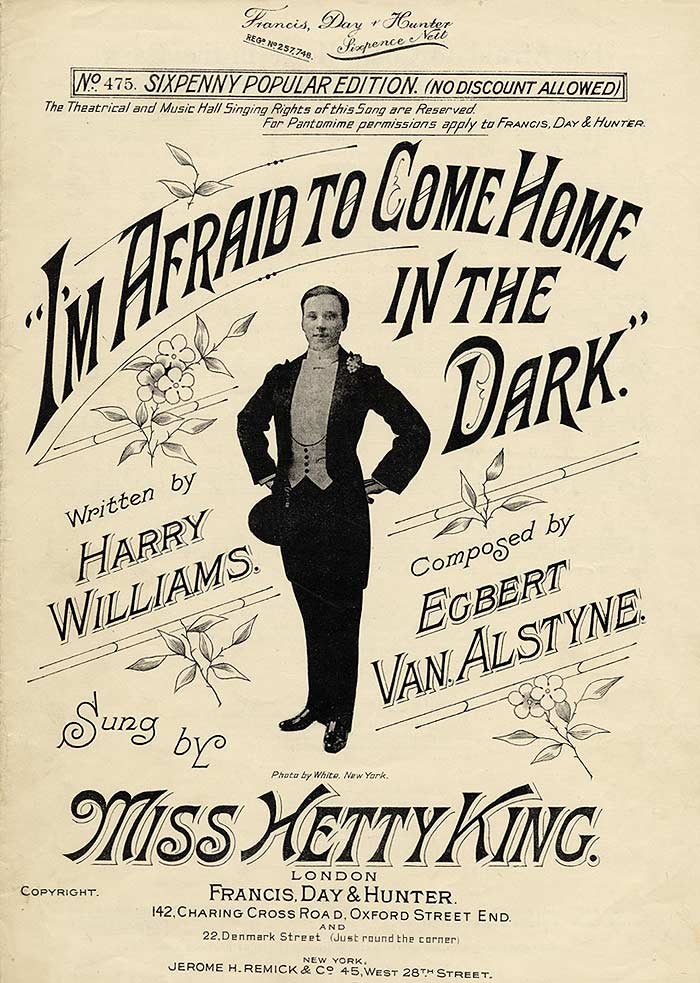
1907 Hetty King sheet music, expressing a concern of modern residents

In the 19th and early 20th centuries, Shoreditch was a centre of entertainment to rival the West End and had many theatres and music halls:

- The National Standard Theatre, 2/3/4 Shoreditch High Street (1837–1940). In the late 19th century this was one of the largest theatres in London. In 1926, it was converted into a cinema called The New Olympia Picturedrome. The building was demolished in 1940. Sims Reeves, Mrs Marriott and James Anderson all appeared here; also performed were programmes of classical opera and even Shakespeare, with actors including Henry Irving. There was considerable rivalry with the West End theatres. John Douglass (the owner, from 1845) wrote a letter to The Era following a Drury Lane first night, in which he commented that "seeing that a hansom cab is used in the new drama at Drury Lane, I beg to state that a hansom cab, drawn by a live horse was used in my drama ... produced at the Standard Theatre ... with real rain, a real flood, and a real balloon."
- The Shoreditch Empire, also known as The London Music Hall, 95–99 Shoreditch High Street (1856–1935). The theatre was rebuilt in 1894 by Frank Matcham, the architect of the Hackney Empire. Charlie Chaplin is recorded as performing here, in his early days, before he achieved fame in America. Purchased in 1934 by adjacent drapery business Jeremiah Rotherham & Co and rebuilt as a warehouse.
- The Royal Cambridge Music Hall, 136 Commercial Street (1864–1936), was destroyed by fire in 1896, then rebuilt in 1897 by Finch Hill, architect of the Britannia Theatre, in nearby Hoxton. The Builder of 4 December 1897 said "The New Cambridge Music Hall in Commercial Street, Bishopsgate, is now nearing completion. The stage will be 41 feet [12.5 m] wide by 30 feet [9.1 m] deep. The premises will be heated throughout by hot water coils, and provision has been made for lighting the house by electric light."

None of these places of entertainment survives today. Music hall was revived for a brief time in Curtain Road by the temporary home of the Brick Lane Music Hall. This too has now moved on.

A number of playbills and posters from these music halls survive in the collections of both the Bishopsgate Institute and the Victoria and Albert Museum.

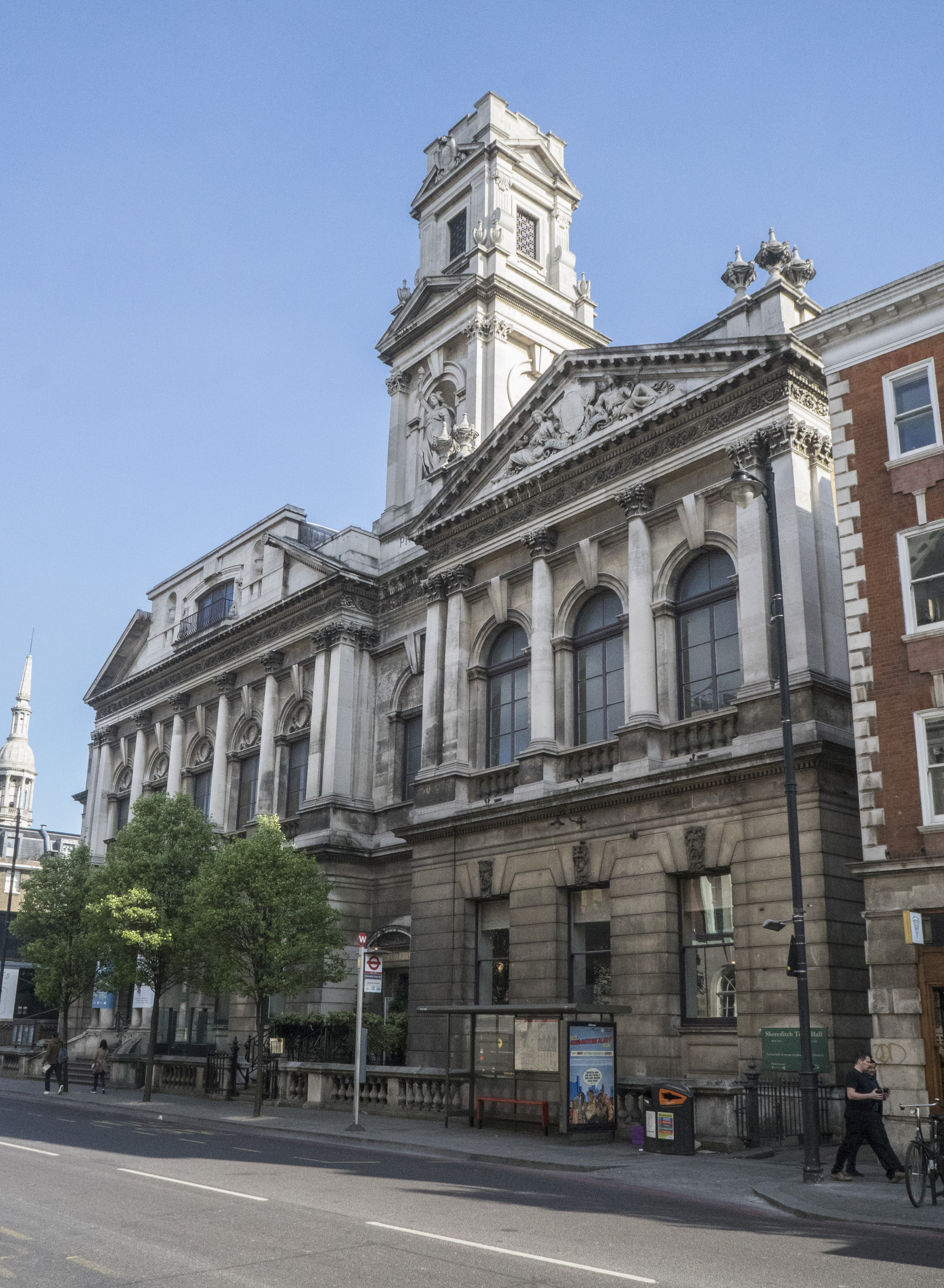
Shoreditch Town Hall

=== First World War ===
In the First World War, the Mayor, Henry Busby Bird, and Borough of Shoreditch raised a pals battalion of volunteers from around the borough who would serve together as the 20th (Service) Battalion, Middlesex Regiment (Shoreditch). The battalion was also known as the 'Boxers' Battalion' (the parent Middlesex Regiment was nicknamed the 'Die-hards'). The volunteers were enlisted at Shoreditch Town Hall and trained at Victoria Park and Columbia Market. The unit served on the Western Front from 1916 to 1918 as part of 121st Brigade of 40th Division, seeing action against the Hindenburg Line and at Bourlon Wood. After the huge casualties it suffered during the German spring offensive of March–April 1918, the battalion returned to England to be reconstituted from men of lower medical category. It then went back to Flanders as part of 14th (Light) Division, and served during the final victorious advance. The battalion's memorial is in St Leonard's Church in Shoreditch High Street.

=== Inter-war years ===
Syd's coffee stall was established in Calvert Avenue in 1919 and operated continuously until 2019.

In the 1930s, Shoreditch, Holy Trinity parish united with that of St Leonard.

=== Second World War ===
Shoreditch was heavily bombed during the Second World War, with around 495 of its civilian residents killed.

The area was hit by at least 279 high explosive bombs, 6 parachute mines 7 V-1 'doodlebugs', 2 V-2 rockets and many thousands of 1 kg incendiary devices. The destruction of housing and industry caused by the two V-2s contributed to the opportunity to create Shoreditch Park and Haggerston Park.

=== Decline ===
Post-war, Shoreditch declined in conditions, as did both textile and furniture industries with competition elsewhere. This situation was exacerbated by the extensive devastation of the housing stock in the Blitz during the Second World War, and by insensitive redevelopment in the post-war period.

A south-west to north-east tube line called the Chelsea–Hackney line was proposed in 1970 by the then London Transport Board's London Rail Study as the next project after the completion of the Victoria line and the Fleet line (now the Jubilee line) but was not carried forward, it would have had a new tube station near Shoreditch Church if it was built.

=== Contemporary ===
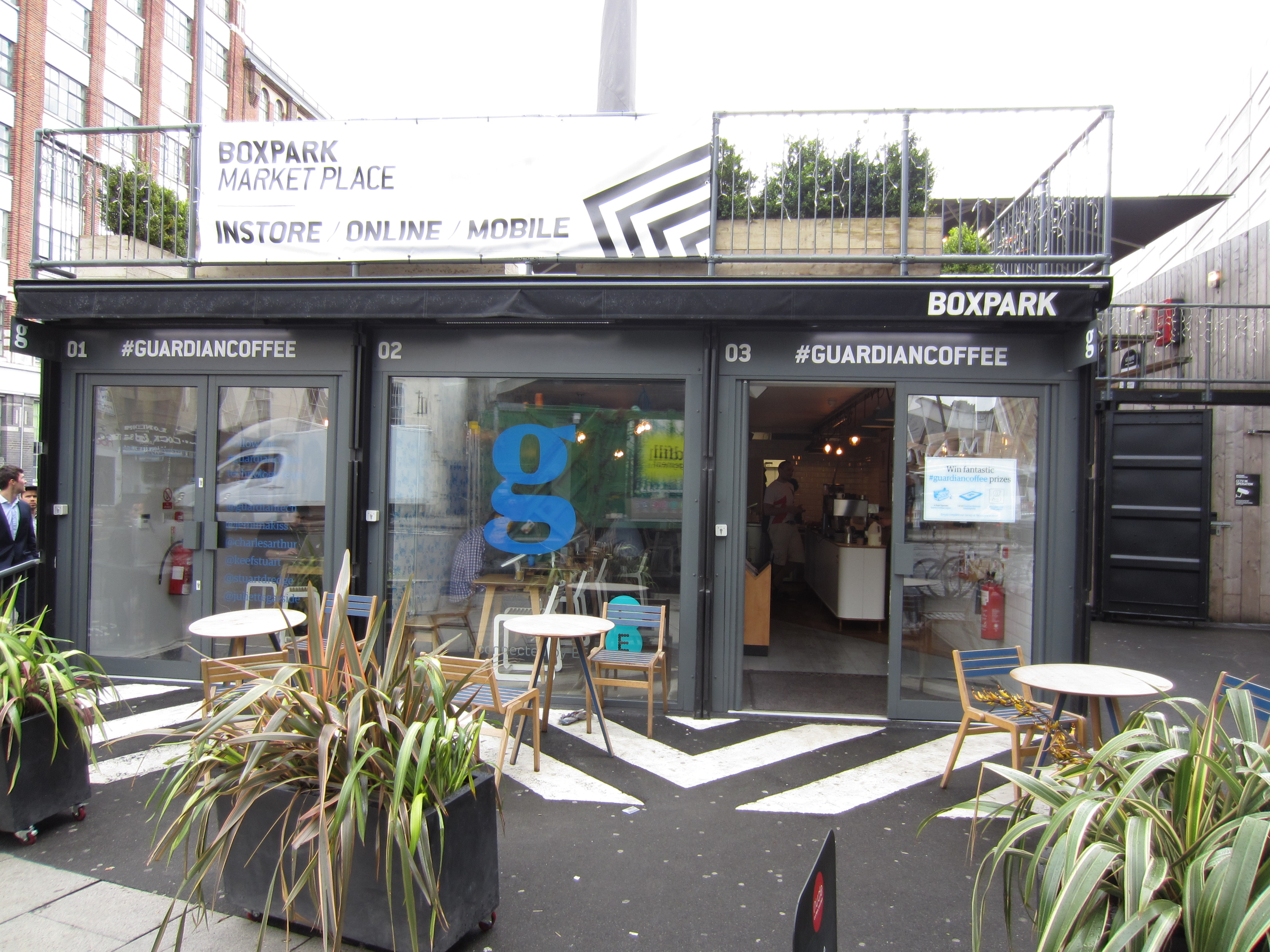
A coffee shop in Boxpark Shoreditch

Formerly a predominantly working-class area, since the 1990s Shoreditch has become a popular and fashionable part of London, particularly associated with the creative industries. Often conflated with its neighbouring sub-district of Hoxton, the area has been subject to considerable gentrification, with accompanying rises in land and property prices.

Former industrial buildings have been converted to offices and flats, while Curtain Road and Old Street are notable for their clubs and pubs which offer a variety of venues to rival those of the West End. Art galleries, bars, restaurants, media businesses and the building of the Hackney Community College campus are features of this transformation.

In the mid-1960s, the main streets of Shoreditch (Old Street, Shoreditch High Street and Curtain Road, Great Eastern Street) were formed into a one-mile-long (1.5-kilometre) one-way system, which became associated with traffic congestion, poor conditions for walking and cycling, high speeds, high collision rates, and delays for bus services. The gyratory system came to be seen as "the main factor holding back the cultural regeneration of South Shoreditch" and "a block to economic recovery". Following a lengthy campaign, the then newly formed Transport for London agreed to revert most of the streets to two-way working, a project which was completed in late 2002.

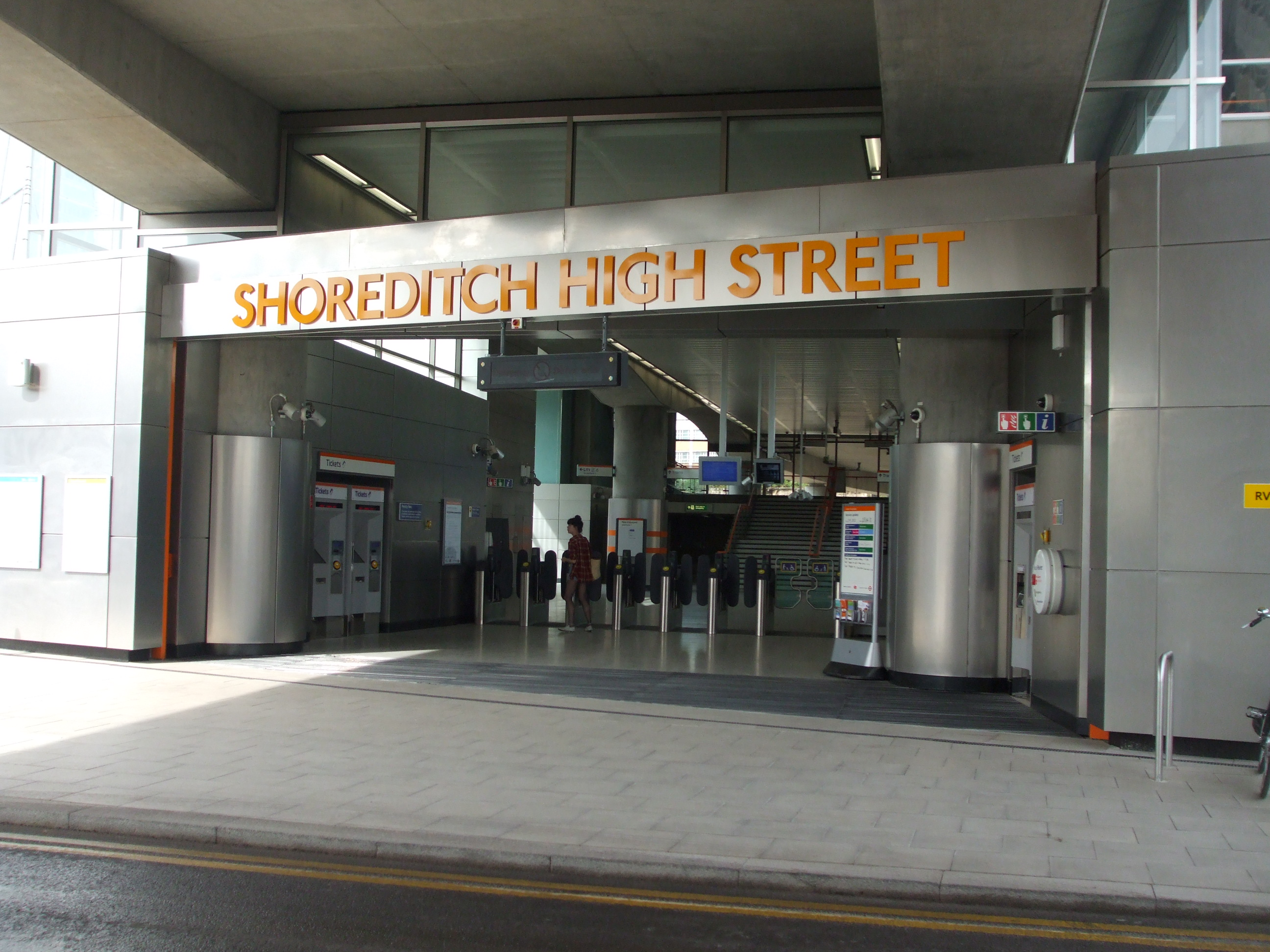
Shoreditch High Street railway station, built as part of the East London Line extension.

In 2005, funding was announced for the East London line extension, to extend the existing tube line from Whitechapel tube station bypassing Shoreditch tube station, and to create a new station named Shoreditch High Street closer to central Shoreditch. This is now served by London Overground services on part of the site of the old Bishopsgate Goods Yard, which was demolished in 2004. The station was built on a viaduct and is fully enclosed in a concrete box structure. This is so that future building works on the remainder of the Bishopsgate site can be undertaken while keeping the station operational.

Tower Hamlets Council made proposals to transfer the Boundary Estate to a housing association and upgrade the accommodation in 2006. A full refurbishment of one of the blocks, Iffley House was carried out by Sprunt Architects to demonstrate how this might be achieved but the proposal was rejected by a ballot of tenants in November of that year.

More recently, during the second "dot-com" boom, both the area and Old Street have become popular with London-based web technology companies who base their head offices around the East London Tech City district. These include Last.fm, Dopplr, Songkick, SocialGO and 7digital. These companies have tended to gravitate towards Old Street Roundabout, giving rise to the term "Silicon Roundabout" to describe the area, as used by Prime Minister David Cameron in a speech in November 2010.

As a result, the name of Shoreditch has become synonymous with the concept of contemporary "hipsterfication" of regenerated urban areas. As a pioneer among similar transformations across the UK, various phrases have been coined, from "Shoreditchification" to "Very Shoreditch".

In 2014, the Boundary Estate and the nearby area came under the East Shoreditch Neighbourhood Forum. Forum status ceased to have effect on 5 February 2019 but the Neighbourhood Area designation is unaffected by the expiry.

The Stag's Head public house was Grade II listed in 2015 by Historic England.

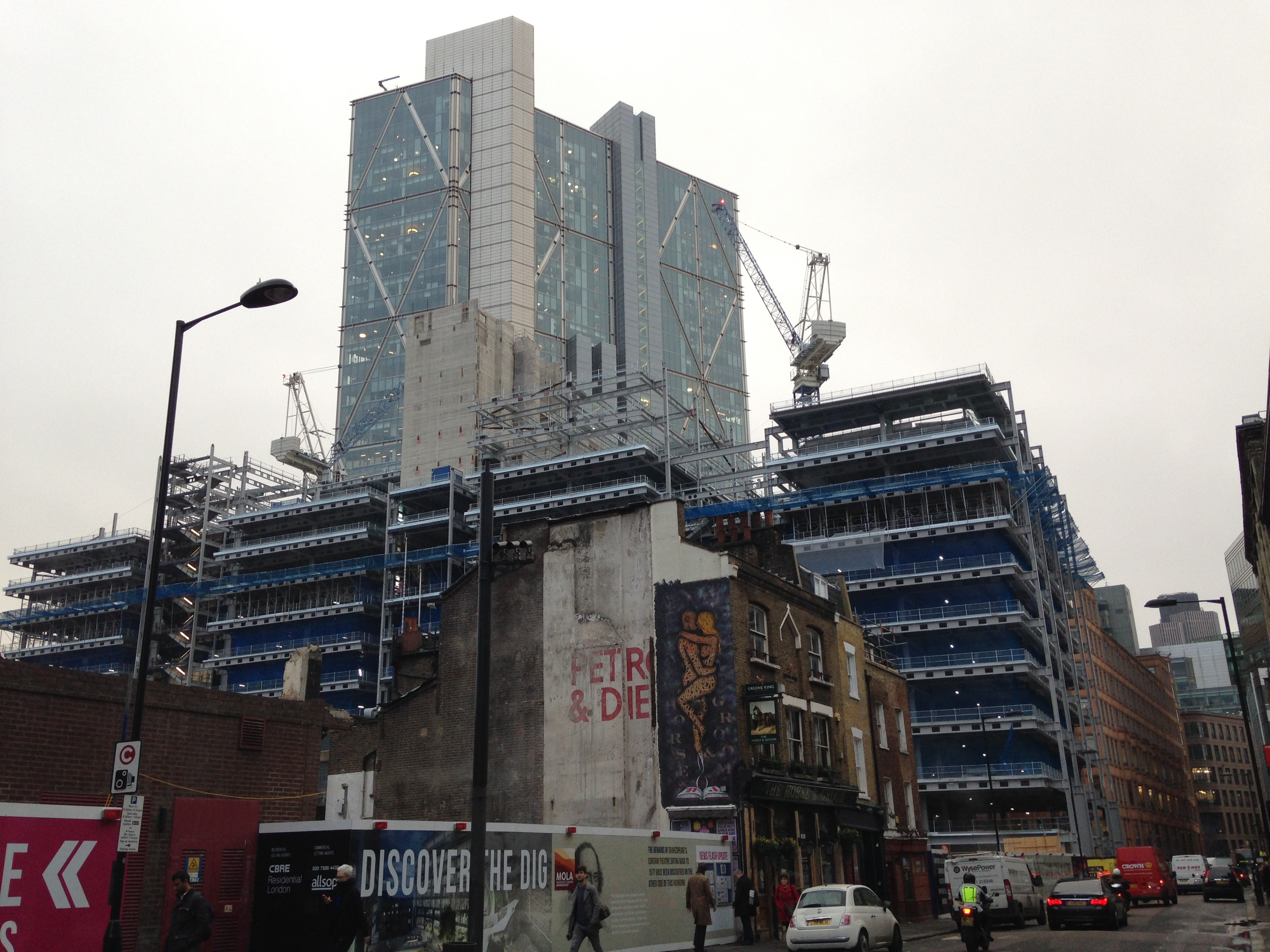
South Shoreditch undergoing reconstruction in 2015

South Shoreditch has undergone an enormous transformation. Several five- or six-storey buildings have been knocked down in the area of Shoreditch that borders the City of London. In their place will be erected a variety of very tall buildings, mirroring the architectural styles in the City. The developments will result in more residential units being available for sale in Shoreditch than were produced by the Olympics athletes' village.

One landmark development is the Principal Tower in Worship Street, designed by the architects Foster and Partners, and next to it is Principal Place, also designed by Foster and Partners. In July 2014, it was reported that the internet retailer Amazon.com was close to signing a lease to move its UK headquarters there. The project had been on hold since January 2012, when the anchor tenant, the law firm CMS Cameron McKenna pulled out. Soon after, the developer Hammerson sold its interest in the scheme to Brookfield.

There has been some consideration of creating an interchange with the Central line between Liverpool Street and Bethnal Green at Shoreditch High Street, where the line runs almost underneath the station. However, this could not be seriously contemplated before the completion of the Crossrail project, owing to extreme crowding on the Central line during peak hours.

London Overground began running 24-hour trains on Friday and Saturday nights between Dalston Junction and New Cross Gate which called at Shoreditch High Street from 15 December 2017. but bypasses Whitechapel and continues on to Shadwell due to ongoing Crossrail construction work for (Elizabeth line) until 2019.

Two Huguenot workers' houses on Club Row on the corner of Redchurch Street, which developers had wished to knock down, were saved from demolition. They were deemed of special historic interest, giving the houses protection from destruction from 2019.

== Geography ==
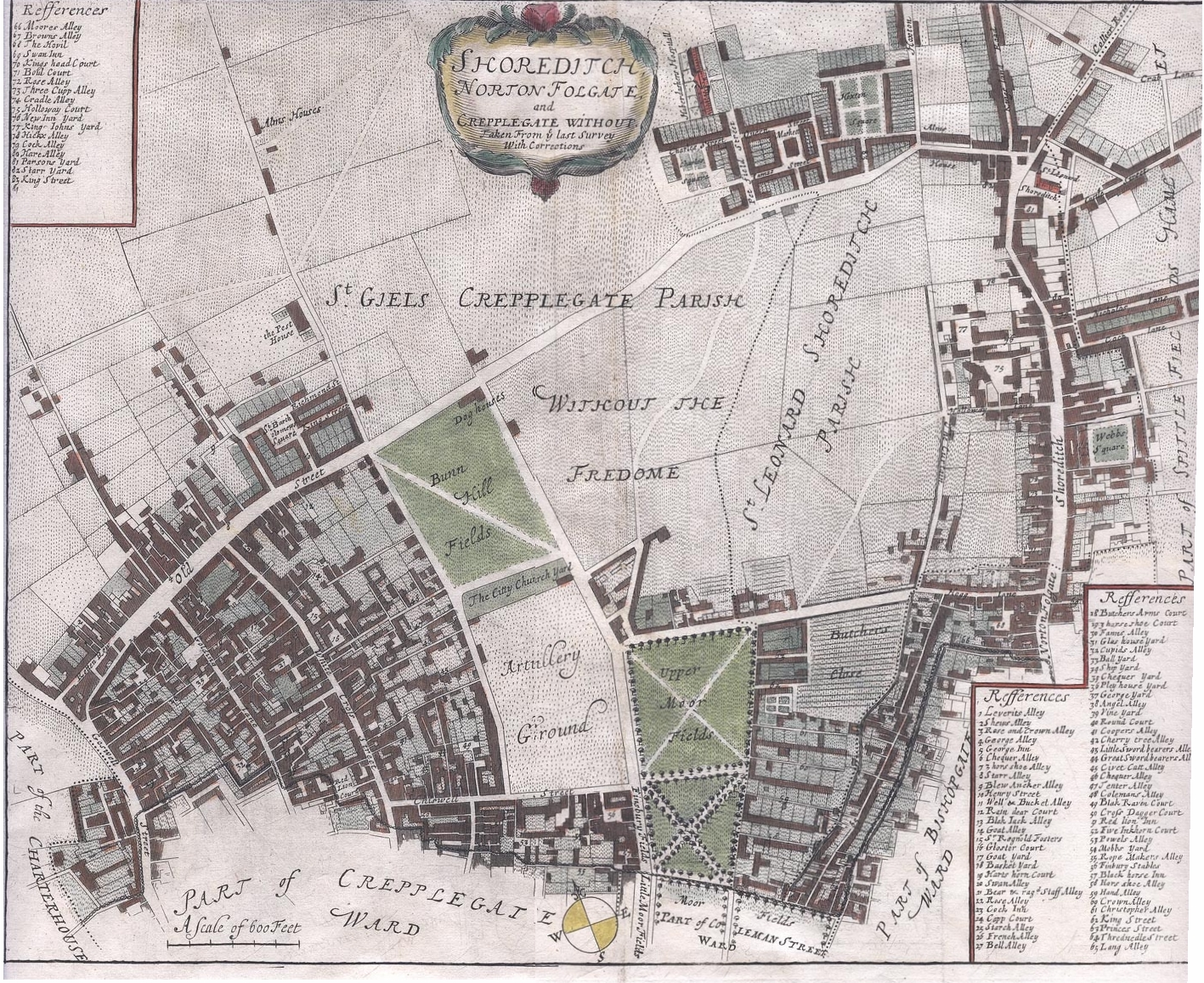
Shoreditch and surrounding area, 1755. The north-eastern part of the map is part of the parish of Shoreditch

Shoreditch covers a wide area, but its historic heart lies south of Old Street, around Shoreditch High Street and Shoreditch Church. The districts of Hoxton and Haggerston have been historically part of Shoreditch since the medieval period and occupy the north-west and north-east of Shoreditch respectively; however, their extent has never been formally defined.

Although Shoreditch has been consistently defined, perceptions have blurred in recent years; something that became possible after the Metropolitan Borough of Shoreditch amalgamated with some of its neighbours to become the southern part of the London Borough of Hackney in 1965.

The location of the former Shoreditch tube station (closed 2006), 400 metres outside Shoreditch proper, in nearby Bethnal Green, Tower Hamlets, influenced this shift. Its replacement, Shoreditch High Street station, straddles the borough boundary.

More significant has been the gentrification of the Shoreditch area since the millennium, leading to a marked increase in the area's prestige, which has led businesses in the Bethnal Green and Spitalfields areas of Tower Hamlets to include the name Shoreditch in their company's name and marketing material. This is also seen to a lesser extent in the St Luke's area of the London Borough of Islington.

== Administration ==
A map showing the wards of Shoreditch Metropolitan Borough as they appeared in 1916.

Shoreditch was an administrative unit with consistent boundaries from the Middle Ages until its merger into the London Borough of Hackney in 1965. Shoreditch was based for many centuries on the Ancient Parish of Shoreditch (St Leonard's), part of the county of Middlesex.

Parishes in Middlesex were grouped into Hundreds, with Shoreditch part of Ossulstone Hundred. Rapid Population growth around London saw the Hundred split into several 'Divisions' during the 1600s, with Shoreditch part of the Tower Division (aka Tower Hamlets). The Tower Division was noteworthy in that the men of the area owed military service to the Tower of London – and had done even before the creation of the Division – an arrangement which continued until 1899.

The Ancient Parishes provided a framework for both civil (administrative) and ecclesiastical (church) functions, but during the nineteenth century there was a divergence into distinct civil and ecclesiastical parish systems. In London the Ecclesiastical Parishes sub-divided to better serve the needs of a growing population, while the Civil Parishes continued to be based on the same Ancient Parish areas.

For civil purposes, the Metropolis Management Act 1855 turned the parish area into a new Shoreditch District of the Metropolis, with the same boundaries as the parish. The London Government Act 1899 converted these areas into Metropolitan Boroughs, again based on the same boundaries, sometimes with minor rationalisations. The Borough's areas of modern Shoreditch, Hoxton and Haggerston were administered from Shoreditch Town Hall, which can still be seen on Old Street. It has been restored and is now run by the Shoreditch Town Hall Trust.

Holy Trinity, Shoreditch in the Old Nichol was for ecclesiastical purposes in Shoreditch from 1866 but was administratively part of Bethnal Green.

In 1965, Shoreditch was merged with Hackney and Stoke Newington to form the new London Borough of Hackney.

=== Governance ===
Shoreditch is home to the Baron Wei of Shoreditch, who lives in the area and sits as a Conservative life peer and Lords Temporal as a member of the House of Lords. He was introduced on 3 June 2010.

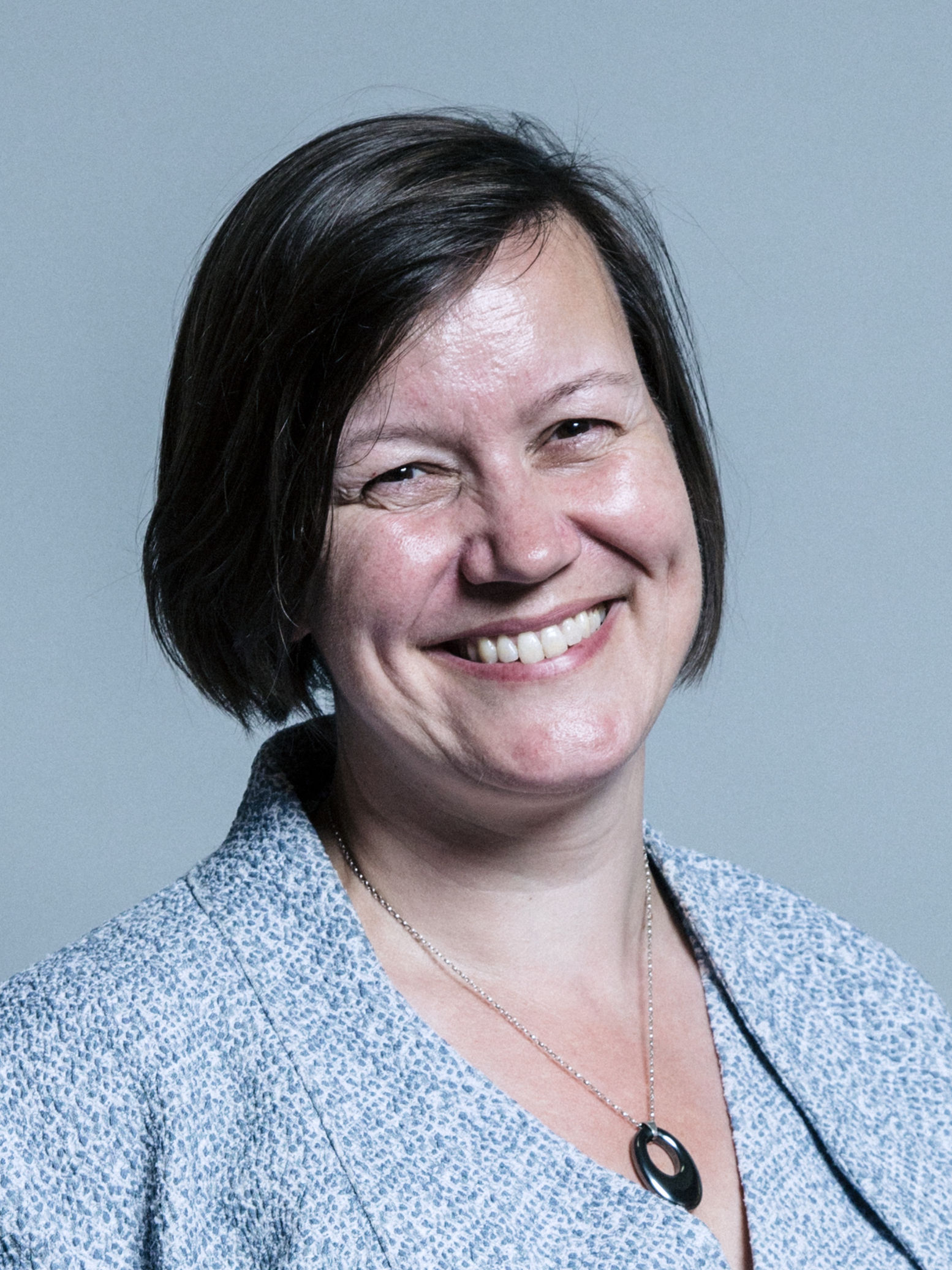
Official portrait of Meg Hillier (MP) of Hackney South and Shoreditch.

The Hackney borough part of Shoreditch is part of the Hackney South and Shoreditch constituency, represented in the House of Commons of the UK Parliament since 2005 by Meg Hillier of the Labour Party and of the Co-operative Party

The eastern part of Shoreditch, in Tower Hamlets, lies within the constituency of Bethnal Green and Bow, represented since 2010 by Rushanara Ali of the Labour Party.

Shoreditch St Leonard
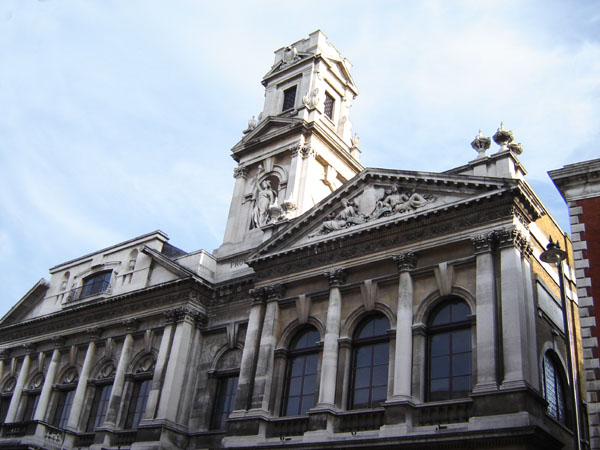
- Area
  - 1881: 648 acres (2.62 km^{2})
  - 1901: 658 acres (2.66 km^{2})
  - 1961: 659 acres (2.67 km^{2})
- Population
  - 1881: 126,591
  - 1901: 118,637
  - 1961: 40,455
- Density
  - 1881: 195/acre
  - 1901: 180/acre
  - 1961: 61/acre
- History
  - Origin: Ancient parish
  - Abolished: 1965
  - Succeeded by: Coterminous with Metropolitan Borough of Shoreditch from 1900; Replaced by London Borough of Hackney
- Status: Civil parish
- Government: Vestry of the Parish of Shoreditch (1855—1900)
  - HQ: Town Hall, Old Street

Shoreditch (St Leonard) was an ancient parish in the county of Middlesex. It was both a civil parish, used for administrative purposes, and an ecclesiastical parish of the Church of England. The parish church is St Leonard's, Shoreditch, often simply called "Shoreditch Church".

=== Civil parish ===
A map showing the wards of Shoreditch Metropolitan Borough as they appeared in 1916.

The civil parish was within the Ossulstone hundred and, from the 17th century, the Tower division. It was entrusted with various administrative functions from the 17th century. The vestry also had responsibility for highways and burials. In 1855 the parish was included in the area of the Metropolitan Board of Works, and the vestry elected two members of the board.

Under the Metropolis Management Act 1855 any parish that exceeded 2,000 ratepayers was to be divided into wards; as such the incorporated vestry of St Leonard Shoreditch was divided into eight wards (electing vestrymen): No. 1 or Moorfields (18), No. 2 or Church (21), No. 3 or Hoxton (21), No. 4 or Wenlock (18), No. 5 or Whitmore (12), No. 6 or Kingsland (12), No. 7 or Haggerstone (9) and No. 8 or Acton (9).

In 1889 the parish was included in the new County of London, and in 1899 the civil vestry were dissolved, and the parish became the Metropolitan Borough of Shoreditch.

The civil parish covered 648 acres (262 ha). The populations recorded in National Censuses were:

Shoreditch St Leonard's Vestry 1801–1899

Year	1801	1811	1821	1831	1841	1851	1861	1871	1881	1891	1901
Population	34,766	43,930	52,966	68,564	83,432	109,257	129,364	127,164	126,591	124,009	118,668

=== Poor law ===
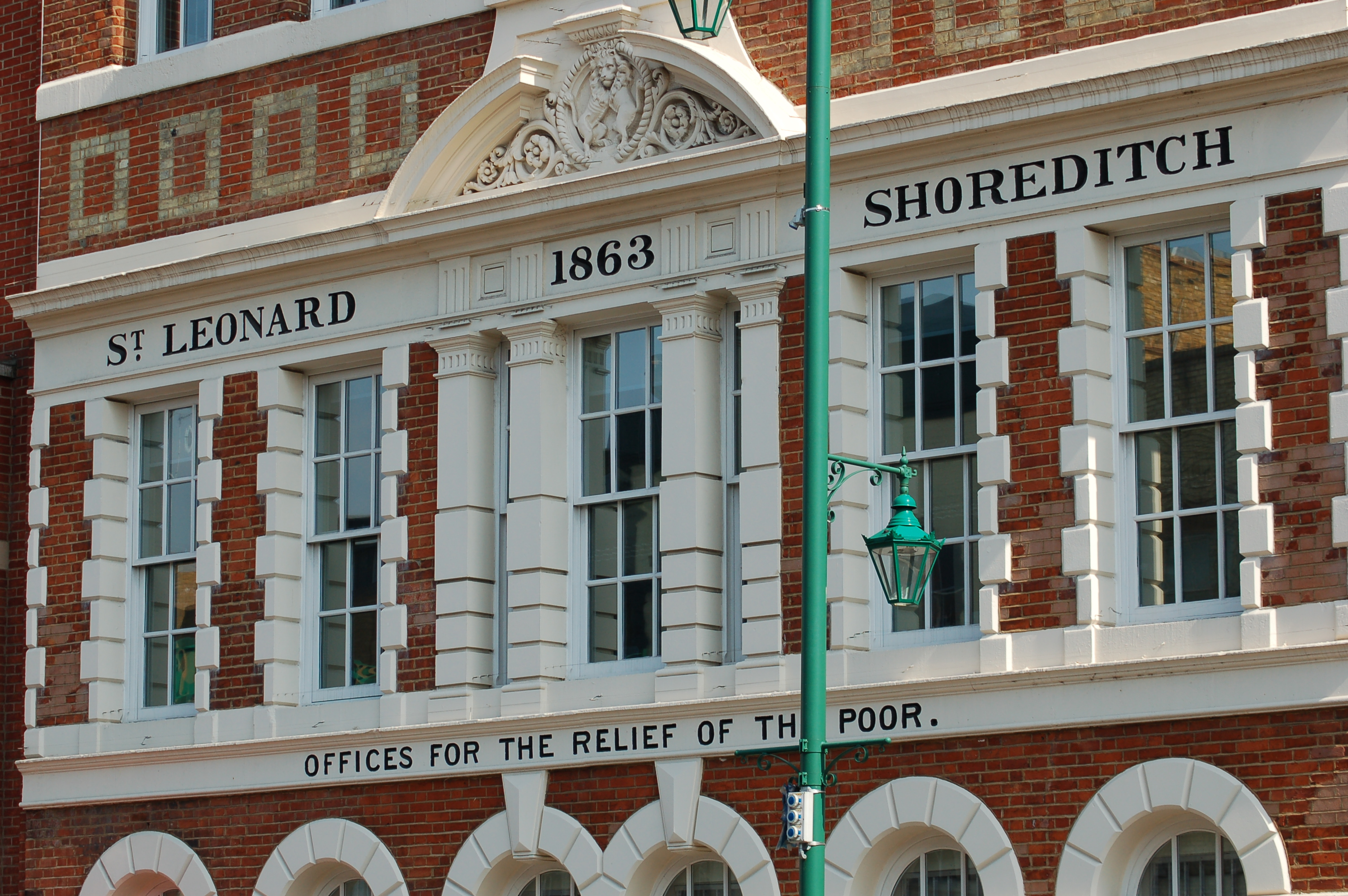
The Hoxton Street façade of the former Shoreditch workhouse. The site stretches to Kingsland Road, where many of the buildings remain as Saint Leonard's hospital.

The precursor of the Saint Leonard's workhouse was housed in several houses in Hoxton. In 1731, that site housed 84 inmates. Saint Leonard's new, three-story workhouse (with infirmary and apothecary) was opened in 1777, thanks to a levy tax passed by an Act of Parliament in 1774. The Shoreditch Vestry built this workhouse on the Parish Poor Trustees' "Land of Promise," on Kingsland Road.

St Leonard's parish circumvented the 1834 Poor Law Amendment Act, because it was administered under its own Act. In 1847, a sub-committee of Parliament found the conditions in the workhouse to be very poor.

=== Ecclesiastical parish ===
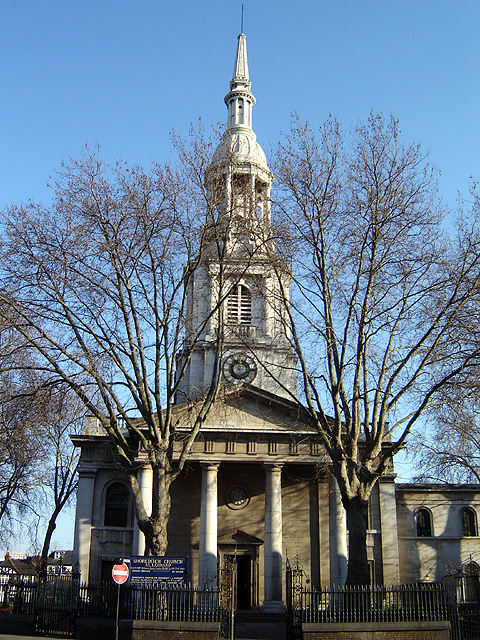
St Leonard's parish church. (January 2006)

St Leonard's parish was within the Diocese of London. As the population increased the parish was divided:

- In 1830 the areas of Haggerston and Hoxton were constituted as separate parishes.
- In 1841 a new parish of "St James, Curtain Road" was created.
- In 1848 part of Saint Leonard's parish helped to form the parish of "St Mark, Old Street".
- In 1862 St Leonard's parish was again divided to create the parish of "Shoreditch, St Michael".
- In 1866 a new parish of "Holy Trinity, Shoreditch" was formed from part of Saint Leonard's and part of neighbouring parish of Bethnal Green.
- In 1872 the parish of "Shoreditch, St Agatha" was created from part of Saint James, Curtain Road.

Later decreases in population led to a number of these parishes being combined in the 20th century. For instance, in 1915 Saint Agatha's parish was absorbed by St James, and in 1972 a merged parish of "Shoreditch, St Leonard with St Michael" was formed.

The names of some of the ecclesiastical parishes were used to give names to wards of the Metropolitan Borough of Shoreditch

== Notable local residents ==
- George Adams (born 1947 in Shoreditch), former professional footballer
- John Appold, FRS (1800–1865), a pioneer of the centrifugal pump
- Russell Brand, actor and comedian
- James Burbage, Tudor actor and impresario: built The Theatre; buried in Shoreditch church
- Richard Burbage, actor in the Lord Chamberlain's Men, Shakespeare's own Company. Renowned for his performance of Shakespeare's greatest roles: Hamlet, Richard III, etc. Buried in the church.
- William James Blacklock, British landscape artist, was born in Shoreditch in 1816
- Joshua Compston, curator & founder of Factual Nonsense; instrumental in the development of the area's art scene in the early 1990s; lived & died in Charlotte Road.
- Luke Evans, Welsh singer, musical performer and film actor lives here
- Thomas Fairchild, gardener, the first person to scientifically produce an artificial hybrid
- Noel Fielding, comedian, film and television actor
- Paul Galvin, Irish fashion designer and former Gaelic footballer
- David Koma, Georgian born fashion designer
- Henry Hate, celebrity tattoo artist; clients include Boy George, Alexander McQueen, Amy Winehouse and Pete Doherty
- Anissa Helou, cookbook author, teacher and chef specialising in the cuisines of the Mediterranean, Middle East and North Africa
- Damien Hirst, artist; instrumental in the development of the area's art scene in the early 1990s
- Dave Kaye, pianist, born in Shoreditch
- Hetty King, a famous male impersonator of the music hall, was born here. Her father, William Emms, was a local comedian known as William King.
- Jon Kortajarena, Spanish model and actor
- Marie Lloyd Jr., actress and composer notable for her impersonations of her mother, Marie Lloyd.
- Christopher Marlowe, Elizabethan dramatist lived in Norton Folgate, the southern continuation of Shoreditch High Street, and wrote plays for the Shoreditch theatres.
- Hoxton Tom McCourt, influential in the late 1970s and early 1980s mod and oi/punk scenes and founder of the band, the 4-Skins, was born in Shoreditch in 1961.
- Bill Meyer, printmaker and artist
- Matt Monro, singer dubbed "the British Sinatra", famous for singing On Days Like These from the film The Italian Job and the title songs of the films Born Free and From Russia with Love
- Miquita Oliver, T4 presenter
- James Parkinson, surgeon, apothecary, geologist, paleontologist and political activist who worked on what would later be named Parkinson's disease
- Jem Smith, bare knuckle prize fighter
- William Sommers, Henry VIII's jester; buried in Shoreditch church.
- Szabotage, graffiti artist and designer
- Richard Tarleton, Elizabethan comedian. Shakespeare's Yorick is believed to be a homage to his memory. Buried in Shoreditch church.
- Russell Tovey, English actor
- Andrew Weatherall, DJ, producer, and remixer
- Nat Wei, Baron Wei, youngest non-hereditary peer ever upon entry to the House of Lords and government advisor on Big Society
- Barbara Windsor, comedian, film and television actress was born there.

== Transport ==
=== Rail ===
Shoreditch High Street station is near Boxpark, on Bethnal Green Road. The station is served by London Overground trains on the East London line, and is in London fare zone 1. Trains link the area directly to Dalston and Highbury & Islington to the northwest, whilst to the south, trains travel directly to major destinations like Canada Water, Clapham Junction, West Croydon, Crystal Palace, New Cross, Peckham and Whitechapel. Hoxton station is to the north of Shoreditch, on the same line.

There is a nearby Overground station at Bethnal Green, with services towards Hackney Downs, Seven Sisters, Chingford, Enfield, and Cheshunt.

Liverpool Street and Old Street tube stations are also nearby. Both stations are also on the National Rail network.

Until 2006, Shoreditch tube station was served by London Underground East London line trains. The line and station closed to make way for the London Overground.

=== Buses ===
London Buses provides all local bus services across the district: routes 8, 135, 205, 388, N8 and N205 on Great Eastern Street and Bishopsgate; routes 26, 35, 47, 48, 67, 78 and N26 on Shoreditch High Street; and routes 55, 149, 242, 243 and N55 on Old Street.

=== Cycling ===
Two Transport for London (TfL) Cycleways pass through Shoreditch.

Cycle Superhighway 1 runs north–south along the western perimeter of the area, through the Old Street junction. The route is signposted, and links the area to Moorgate and Finsbury southbound, and to Dalston, Stoke Newington, and Seven Sisters to the north.

Quietway 13 runs east–west through Shoreditch, primarily on quiet streets. The route is signposted, and runs from Finsbury in the City to the Regent's Canal near Cambridge Heath.

The Regent's Canal towpath runs along the northernmost edge of the district, close to Shoreditch Park. The towpath is a shared-use path for pedestrians and cyclists and runs unbroken from Angel in Islington to Limehouse near Canary Wharf. Eastbound, the path links the area to Victoria Park and Mile End.

The London Cycle Hire Scheme operates in Shoreditch.

== See also ==
- Curtain Road Arts
- East London Line
- Hackney College
- Hackney Community College Basketball Academy
- London United Basketball
- Shoreditch Park

== Bibliography ==
- Ackroyd, Peter (2000). London: The Biography. London: Chatto & Windus. ISBN 1856197166.
- Clifton, Lara, ed. (2002). Baby Oil and Ice: Striptease in East London. London: Do-Not Press. ISBN 1899344853.
- Harrison, Paul (1983). Inside the Inner City: Life Under the Cutting Edge. Harmondsworth: Penguin. ISBN 014022419X.
- Mander, David (1996). More Light, More Power: An Illustrated History of Shoreditch. Stroud: Sutton. ISBN 0750912170.
- Schoenbaum, Samuel (1987). William Shakespeare: a Compact Documentary Life. Oxford: Oxford University Press. ISBN 0195051610.
- Shapiro, James S. (2005). 1599: A Year in the Life of William Shakespeare. London: Faber. ISBN 0571214800.
- Sugden, Keith (2002). Under Hackney: The Archaeological Story. London: Friends of Hackney Archives.
- Taylor, William (2001). This Bright Field:a travel book in one place. London: Methuen. ISBN 0413746801.
- Wood, Michael (2003). In Search of Shakespeare. London: BBC. ISBN 056353477X.

== Sources ==
- Guide to the Local Administrative Units of England, Vol.1, Frederic Youngs, London, 1979
