= St Leonard's, Shoreditch =

Church in Shoreditch, London

Coordinates: 51°31′36.30″N 00°04′37.92″W

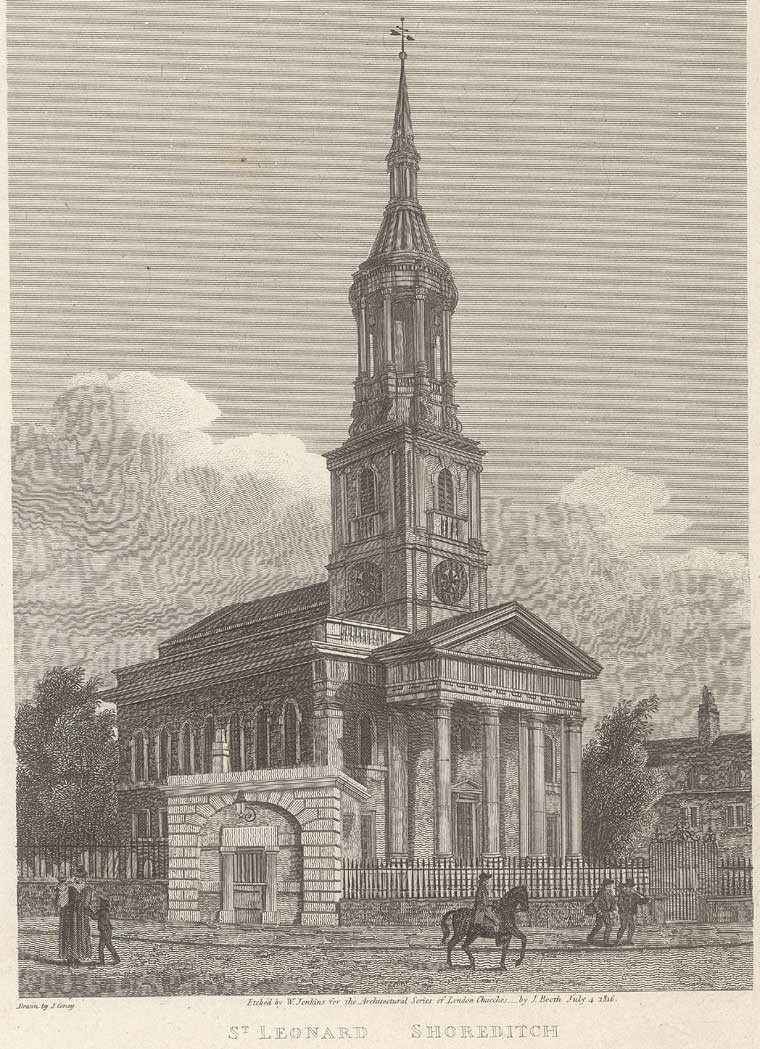
- 18th-century print of St Leonard's
- St Leonard's, Shoreditch
- Location: London Borough of Hackney
- Country: England
- Denomination: Church of England

Architecture
- Architect: George Dance the Elder
- Style: Palladian
- Years built: 1740

Administration
- Diocese: London

Clergy
- Vicar: Paul Turp

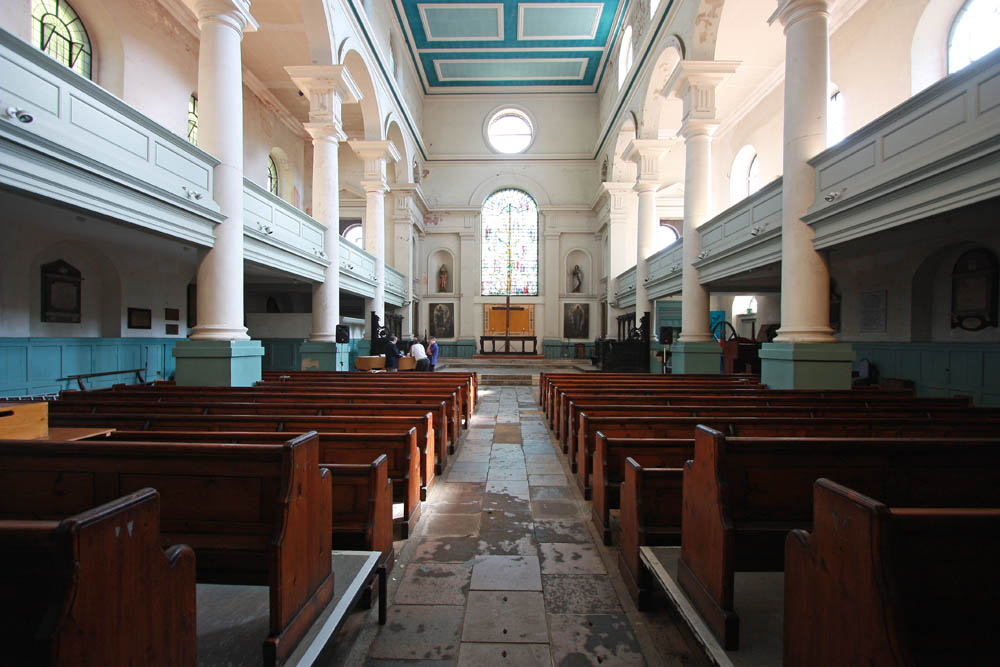
Looking towards the east end

St Leonard's, Shoreditch, is the old parish church of Shoreditch, often known simply as Shoreditch Church. It is located at the intersection of Shoreditch High Street with Hackney Road, within the London Borough of Hackney in East London. The current building dates from about 1740 and is Grade I listed. The church is mentioned in the line "'When I grow rich', say the bells of Shoreditch" from the nursery rhyme Oranges and Lemons.

The crypt beneath the church is the final resting place of many actors from the Tudor period.

== Origins ==
The original church is possibly Anglo-Saxon in origin, and is thought to be built on the site of an Anglo-Saxon predecessor. The first historical reference to it occurs in the 12th century.

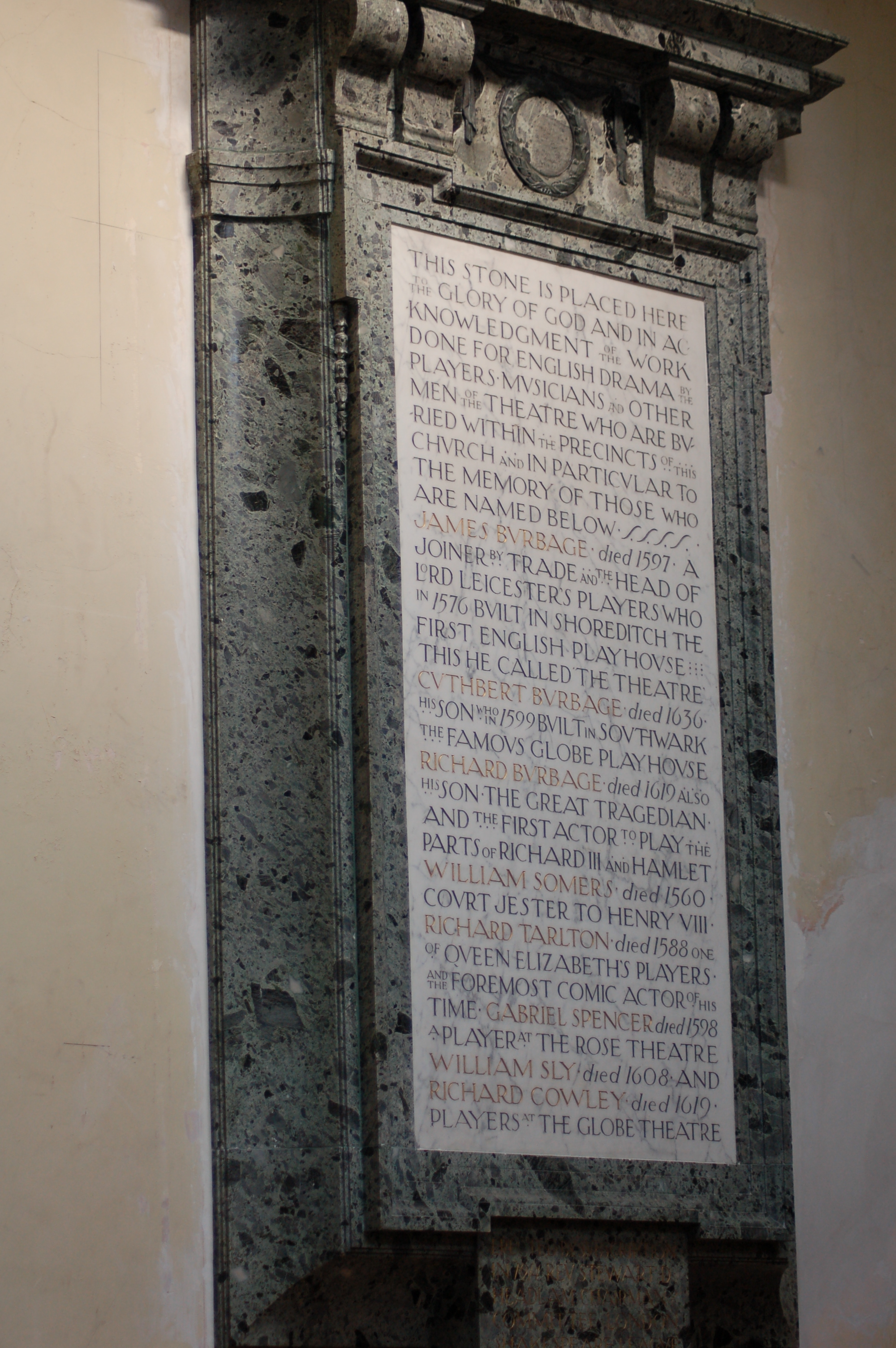
Memorial to Tudor actors buried in the church

The church was situated near The Theatre, England's first purpose-built playhouse, built in Shoreditch in 1576, and the Curtain Theatre (built in 1577). Several members of the theatrical profession from the Elizabethan period are buried in the church, including:

- James Burbage, the founder of The Theatre, England's first playhouse.
- His son Richard, who was the leading man in many of Shakespeare's plays, which were first performed in the contemporary Shoreditch theatres.
- The comedian Richard Tarlton, who was a stalwart of the pre-Shakespearian stage.
- The actor Gabriel Spenser, who was killed by Ben Jonson in a duel.

These, with others of their profession from the period, are commemorated by a large classical memorial erected by the London Shakespeare League in 1913, inside the church, which serves as a reminder of Shoreditch's Shakespearian heritage.

The Shoreditch Vestry levied a special poor rate in 1774 for the purpose of setting up a workhouse for the parish of St Leonard's, which highlights the level of poverty in the area.

== Current building ==
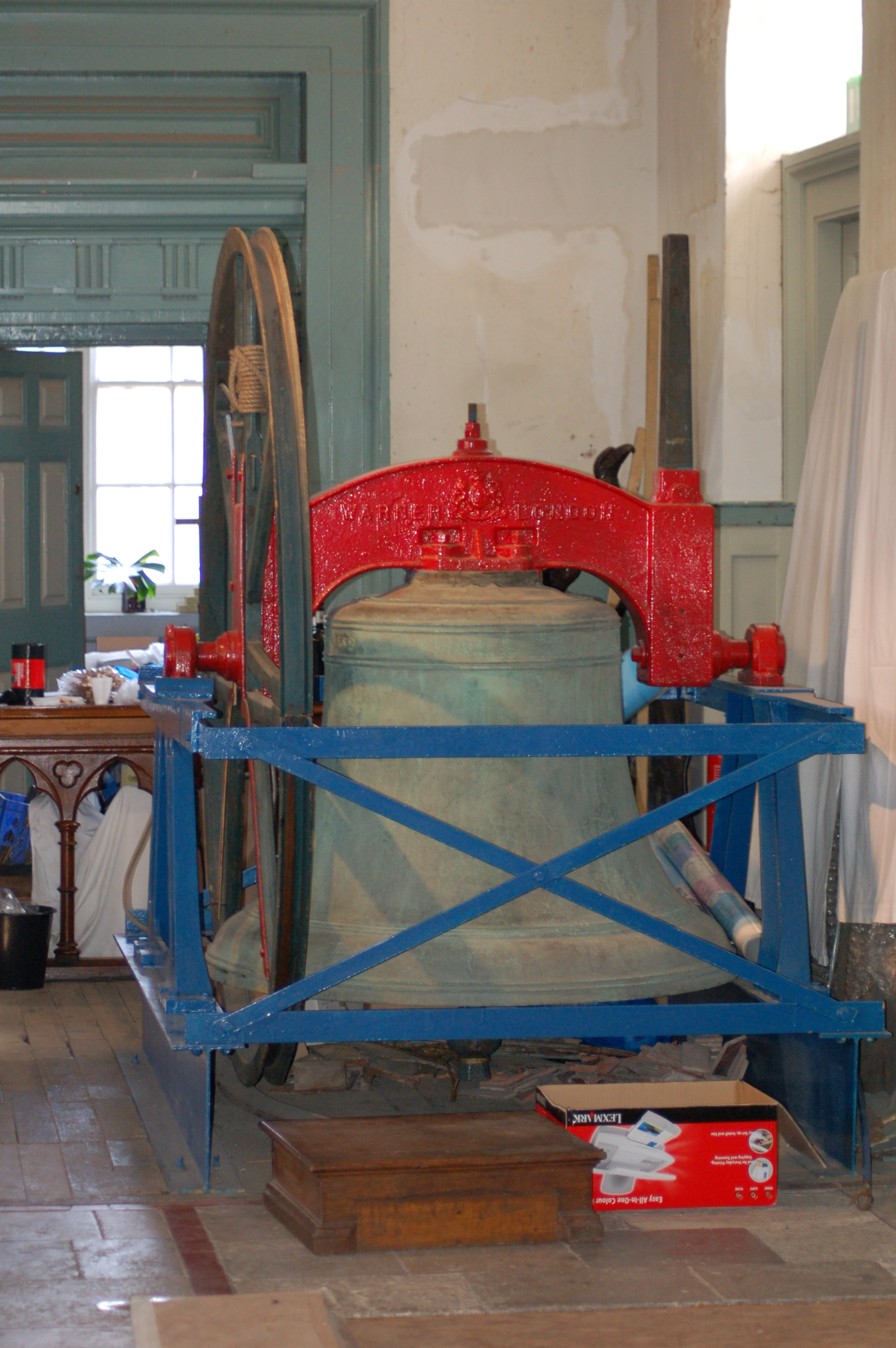
One of the bells, removed for maintenance

Following a partial collapse of the tower in 1716, the medieval church was rebuilt in Palladian style by George Dance the Elder during 1736–40, with a soaring steeple 192 feet tall—an imitation of Christopher Wren's magnificent steeple on St Mary-le-Bow in Cheapside—and a giant four-columned, pedimented Tuscan portico. Inside the church, the entablature is supported by giant Doric columns. Dance was also architect of the Mansion House. Many original 18th-century fixtures and fittings remain, including the font, the pulpit, the communion table, clock, organ case, bread cupboards and commandment boards. It was lit with gaslight in 1817, the first in London.

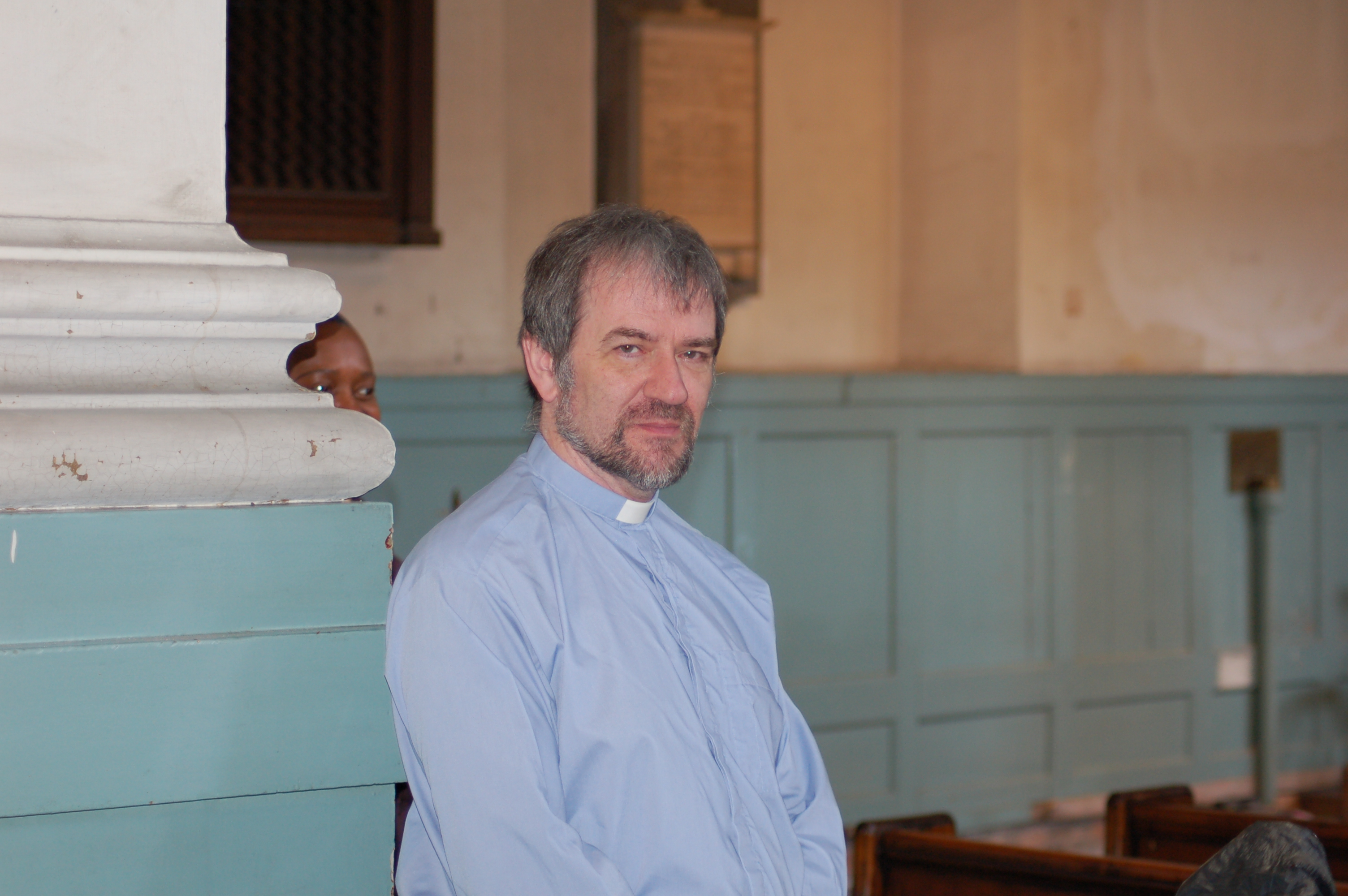
The Rev'd Paul Turp, Vicar of Shoreditch

The parish stocks and whipping post stand in the porch of the church, and the Shoreditch parish pump is in the churchyard.

=== Bells ===
Whilst the church has had bells for many centuries, as evidenced by its inclusion in the Oranges and Lemons nursery rhyme, the current ring of 12 bells (plus a "sharp second" to allow a lighter ring of eight bells using 1, sharp second and 3–8 to ring a true octave), hung for change ringing, dates from 1994 when the bells were cast by John Taylor & Co, bellfounders of Loughborough.

The bells in the coat of arms of the London Borough of Hackney represent the bells of this church.

=== Tracker organ ===
The organ was built by Richard Bridge in 1756, and retains all the original wooden pipes. It is one of the few surviving examples of a tracker organ without pedals. It is in need of restoration.

=== Church organ ===
The church is equipped with a modern electric organ that is used regularly for church services, worship, concerts, and recording. It was the organ used in the Serafina Steer album The Moths Are Real, produced by Jarvis Cocker.

=== Media use ===
Between 2010 and 2014, the church was used in the BBC TV comedy series Rev., as a fictional Shoreditch church named St Saviour in the Marshes.

In 2011 the church featured in series two of Luther.

== Distinguished parishioners ==
James Parkinson (1755–1824), after whom Parkinson's disease is named, and who lived at Hoxton Square nearby, is commemorated with a stone tablet inside the church; his grave is in the churchyard.

William Lewin, an Elizabethan churchman, tutor, and member of parliament, was buried in the church in 1598.

John George Appold, FRS (1800–65), a pioneer of the centrifugal pump, is commemorated with a stone tablet inside the church.

The Rev. Samuel Annesley (1620–96), the prominent nonconformist minister and father of Susanna Wesley (thus grandfather of John and Charles Wesley), is buried in an unmarked plot in the churchyard.

Thomas Fairchild (1667–1724), a pioneer gardener and the author of The City Gardener, endowed an annual Whitsun sermon at the church on either The Wonderful World of God in the Creation or On the Certainty of the Resurrection of the Dead proved by Certain Change of the Animal and Vegetable Parts of the Creation. These sermons became locally known as "The Vegetable Sermon", and continued into the 1990s.

The Tudor diplomat Thomas Legh (?1511-1545) is also buried here.

Katherine Stafford, wife of Ralph Neville, 4th Earl of Westmorland, is buried here.

Johannes Banfi Hunyades, Hungarian alchemist and metallurgist, attended the church and two of his children, Johannes (1621–1696) and Elizabeth (1620–1710), have monumental graves in the crypt of the church.

== See also ==
- List of churches in London
- The Clerk's House, former watch house for the church's cemetery
