= Mariele Neudecker =

German artist (born 1965)

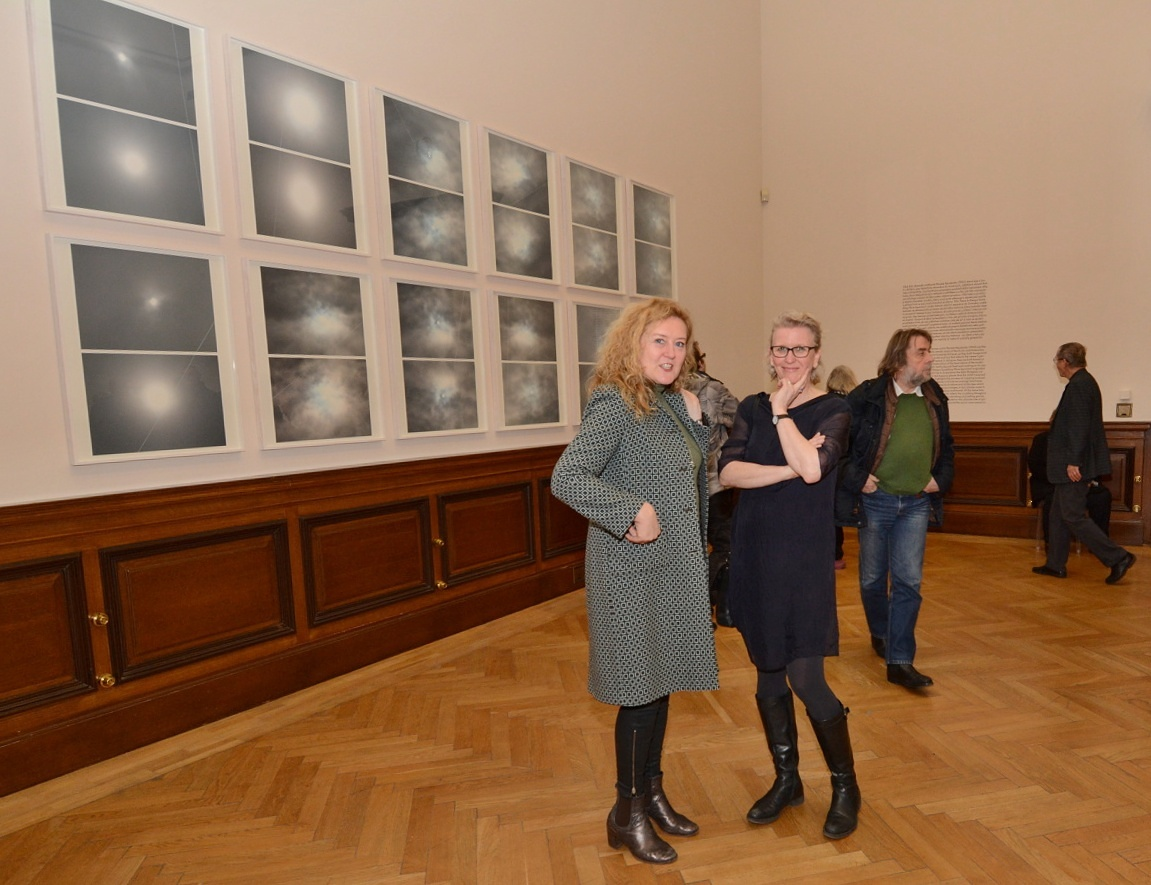
Neudecker at the opening of the exhibition Model, Galerie Rudolfinum, Prague, 2015

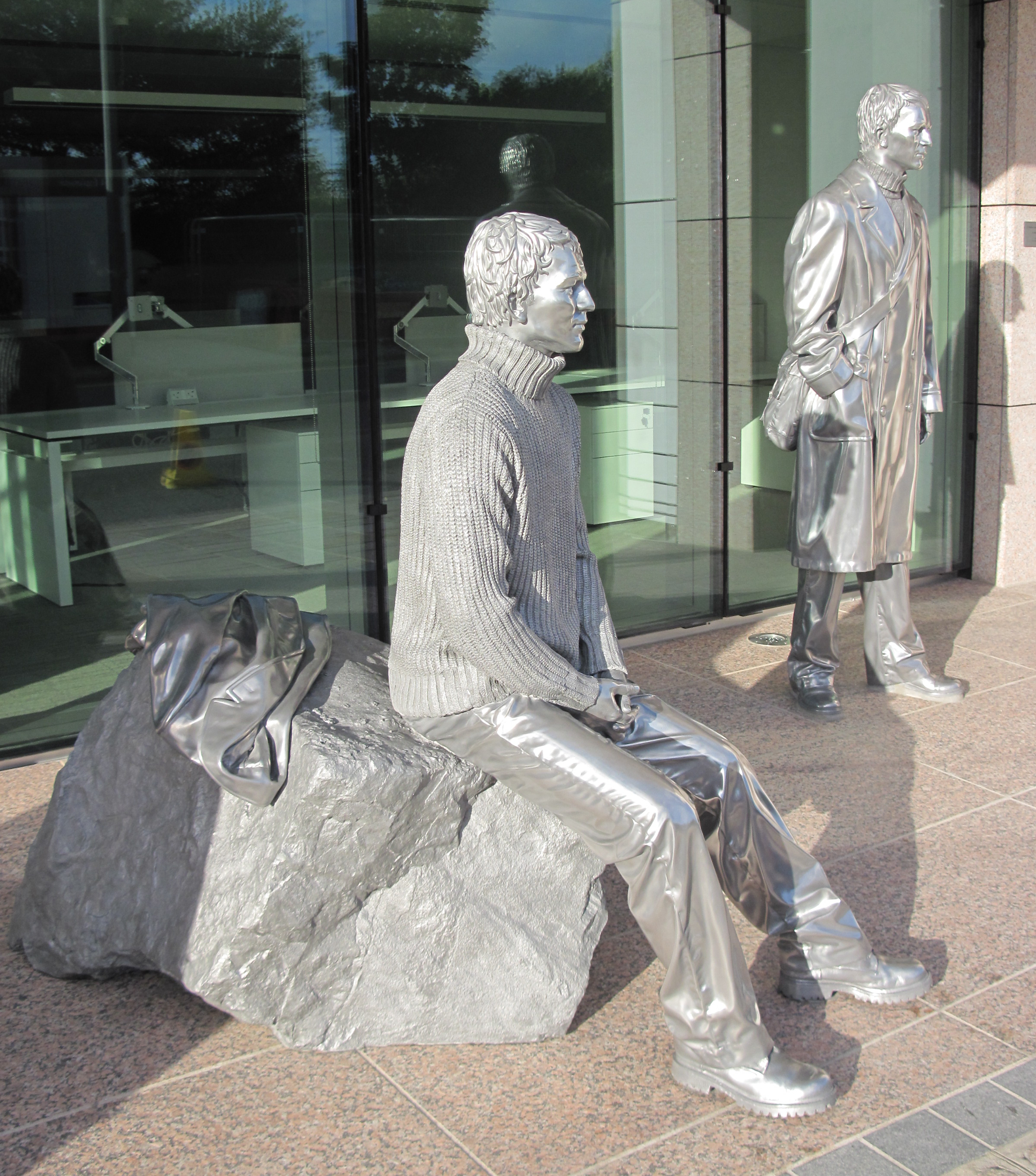
"2.5 Million Light Years and Doppelgänger", in cast aluminium - unveiled in Saint Helier, Jersey, 28 July 2010 by Treasury Minister, Senator Philip Ozouf.

Mariele Neudecker (born 1965) is a German artist who lives and works in Bristol, England. Neudecker uses a broad range of media including sculpture, installation, film and photography. Her practice investigates the formation and historical dissemination of cultural constructs around the natural world, focusing particularly on landscape representations within the Northern European Romantic tradition and today's notions of the Sublime. Central to the work is the human interest and relationship to landscape and its images used metaphorically for human psychology.

Neudecker has shown widely internationally, notably in Biennales in Japan, Australia and Singapore, also solo shows in Ikon Gallery, Tate St Ives and Tate Britain. In 2010 she presented a solo exhibition at Galerie Barbara Thumm, Berlin, won the Ludwig Gies Preis for her participation at Triennale Fellbach 2010 (Germany), made a new commission for Extraordinary Measures, Belsay Hall, Castle and Gardens, Newcastle upon Tyne, England and was invited to spend three month at the Headlands Center for the Arts, San Francisco, US. She was a guest artist at the physics laboratory CERN in 2017 and 2019.

She was born in Düsseldorf, Germany.

== Education ==
- 1985–1987: Crawford College of Art and Design, Cork, Ireland
- 1987–1990: Goldsmiths' College (BA Hons Degree), London
- 1991–1992: Chelsea College of Art and Design (MA Sculpture), London
- 1996–1997: Tower Hamlets College (Digital Image Creation/Manipulation), London

== Exhibitions ==
=== Solo exhibitions ===
- 2000 Until Now, Ikon Gallery, Birmingham, UK
- 2000 Until Now, 1stSite at the Minories, Colchester, UK
- 2001 Until Now, Künstlerhaus Bethanien & Galerie Barbara Thumm, Berlin
- 2002 Between Us, Chapter, Cardiff, Wales, (cat.)
- 2003 Frozen, Site Gallery, Sheffield
- 2003 Winterreise, Opera North Touring Project
- 2003 Between Us, Chapter Touring (Glynn Vivian Art Gallery, Swansea, Leeds City art Gallery, Bluecoat - Liverpool), UK
- 2004 Winterreise, Opera North Project (various venues), UK
- 2004 Between Us, Tullie House, Carlisle, GB, Laing Gallery, Newcastle, UK
- 2004 Over and Over, Again and Again, Tate St Ives, Cornwall, UK, (cat.)
- 2004 Much Was Decided Before You Were Born, Galerie Barbara Thumm, Berlin
- 2005 Kindertotenlieder, Impressions Gallery, York, UK (DVD-cat.)
- 2005 Over and Over, Again and Again, Tate Britain, London Winterreise, Opera North Project (various venues), UK
- 2006 Kindertotenlieder (Songs on the Death of Children), Salts Mill, Saltaire, Colston Hall Bristol; Bonnington Gallery, Nottingham, UK
- 2006 Ambassador, Republic Tower Billboard Project, Centre for Contemporary Art in Association with Visible Art Foundation, Melbourne, Australia
- 2007 Afterlife (2 permanent video works), Egyptian Collection, Bristol's City Museum and Art Gallery, Bristol
- 2008 2.5 million light years, commission for the NewArtCentre, Roche Court, Salisbury, UK
- 2008 Mariele Neudecker, Gallery Barbara Thumm, Berlin
- 2008 This Thing Called Darkness, Arts Towada, Towada, Japan (cat.)
- 2009 Winterreise, full length screening at Prince Charles Cinema, London, UK
- 2009 Winterreise, live performances Leicester, Leeds and Lancaster
- 2009 Mariele Neudecker - New Works, ROOM, London
- 2009 Mariele Neudecker, Stay Forever and Never Come Back, The Dovecote Studio, Aldeburgh Music, Snape Maltings, Suffolk, UK
- 2010 Mariele Neudecker, Galerie Barbara Thumm, Berlin (leparello publication)
- 2011 Kindertotenlieder, Mariele Neudecker, Howard Assembly Hall, Opera North, Leeds, UK
- 2012 Mariele Neudecker, Parhelion, Thomas Rehbein Gallery, Cologne, Germany

=== Commissions ===
- 2019: And Then the World Changed Colour: Breathing Yellow, sculptural installation, Dulwich Picture Gallery, Dulwich, South London, 2019

=== Group exhibitions ===
- 2015 Model, Galerie Rudolfinum, Prague
