= Shoreditch High Street =

Street in Shoreditch

Coordinates: 51°31′27″N 0°04′39″W

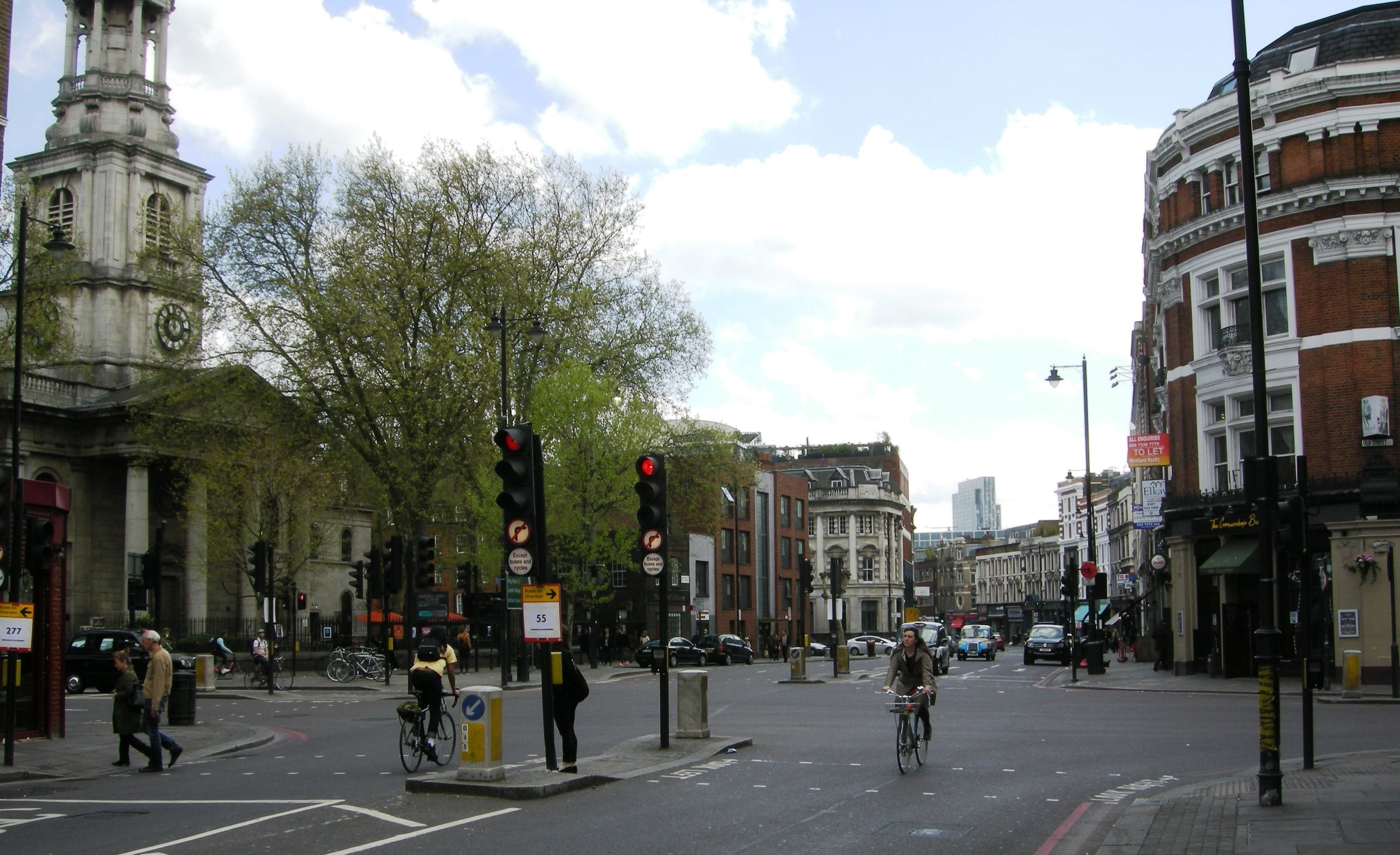
Northern end of Shoreditch High Street, viewed from Kingsland Road. St Leonard's Church is to the left.

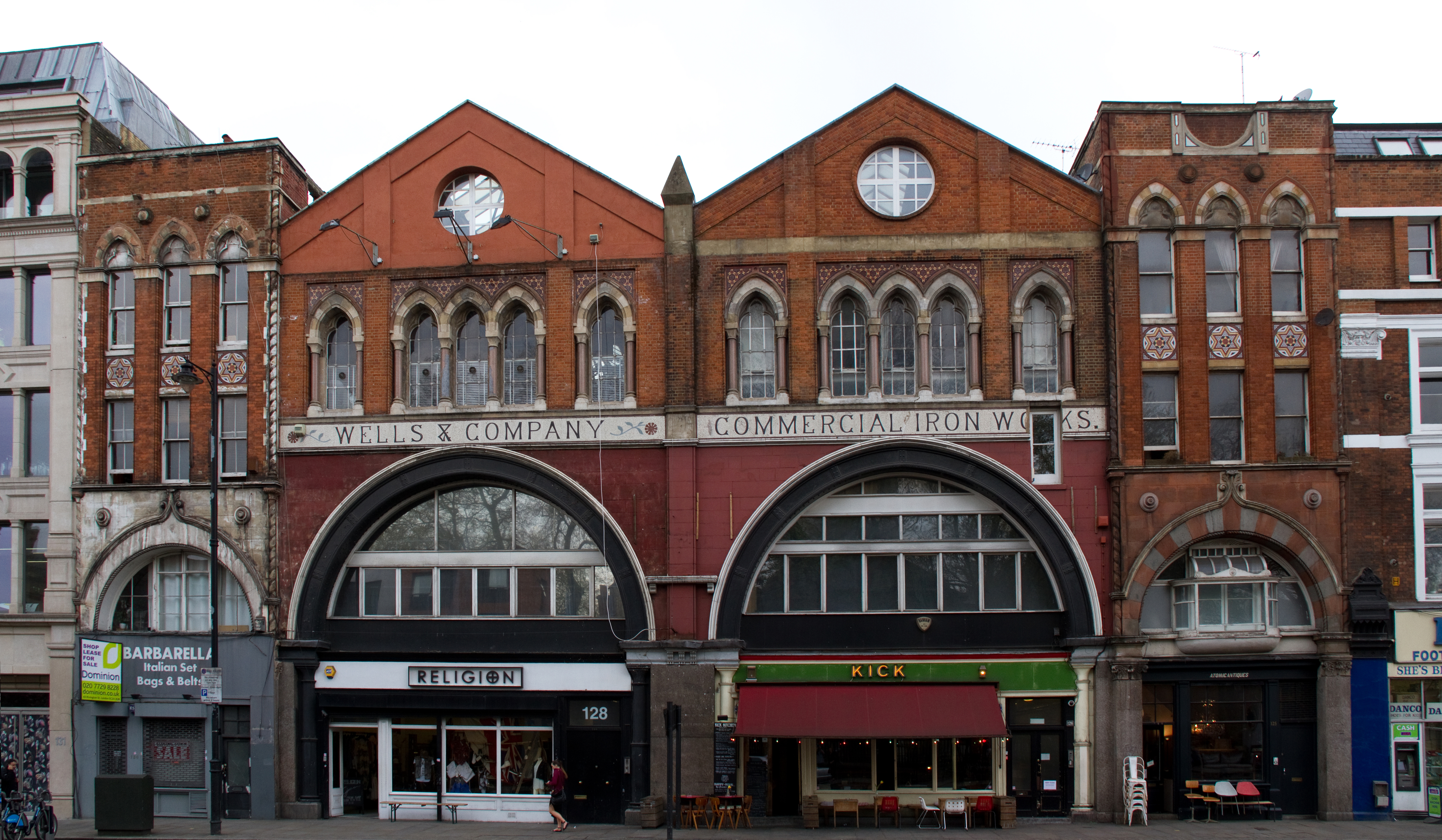
Former Wells & Company Ironworks building, Shoreditch High Street

Shoreditch High Street is the old main street of Shoreditch, London. It is part of the A10 road and connects Norton Folgate to the south with Kingsland Road to the north. It constitutes a segment of the Roman Ermine Street, which ran directly north from London to Lincoln and York. The parish church of St Leonard's, Shoreditch is situated at the north-east end of the road, at the crossroads where it meets with Hackney Road.

In the past, Shoreditch High Street boasted both a prestigious theatre and a music hall, though these are now long gone; no trace survives.

The National Standard Theatre at 2/3/4 Shoreditch High Street opened in 1837. By the late 19th century it was one of the largest theatres in London. In 1926, it was converted into a cinema called the New Olympia Picturedrome. The building was demolished in 1940. Sims Reeves, Mrs Marriott and James Robertson Anderson all performed there; the theatre also hosted programmes of classical opera and even Shakespeare, sometimes featuring well-known actors including Henry Irving.

The Shoreditch Empire, also known as the London Music Hall, which opened in 1856, was situated at 95–99 Shoreditch High Street. It lasted longer than most East End halls, but finally closed in 1934 and was demolished the following year.

As it traverses modern-day inner city Shoreditch, the road is lined with (sometimes derelict) commercial premises. To the east is the Boundary Estate, formerly the infamous "Jago" of Arthur Morrison's 1896 novel A Child of the Jago. The concentration of striptease pubs located along the road continues the local low-life tradition, though the recent opening of some trendy bars that cater to the affluent residents of nearby Hoxton indicates the arrival of gentrification in the area.

A large department drapery store called Jeremiah Rotherham & Co once existed in the High Street, taking up the frontage from 80 to 91. The store also purchased the adjacent Shoreditch Empire Theatre in 1934 and built a warehouse on the site. When the main store was destroyed by bombing during the Blitz the company transferred to the new warehouse and reopened.

The Clerk's House stands at number 118½. Dating to the early 18th century, it is believed to have formerly been a watch house, from which somebody looked out for body snatchers in the adjacent St Leonard's churchyard. It is now a business.
