= Szabotage =

British artist and interior designer

- Born: Gustav Szabo
- Occupations: artist and designer

Szabotage is a British artist and interior designer.

== Early life ==
Szabotage is from Hove in East Sussex and his original name is Gustav Szabo. He received university education in architecture before becoming a professional artist.

== Career ==
After producing street art in London, in 2013 the artist moved to Hong Kong and began producing graffiti pieces both publicly and privately. In 2014 he was named a finalist in the city's Secret Walls street art competition. His work is found in Hong Kong neighbourhoods including Sai Ying Pun, Big Wave Bay, and Yuen Long. Szabotage has also produced metal sculptures in the city.

The artist held his first exhibition in the city in 2014. He held his fourth solo exhibition in Hong Kong entitled Gone Fishing, featuring a series of paintings including a "koi" theme. The koi image used is the same that Szabotage has painted around the city as a part of his works. The show exhibited about thirty different installations, and was held at California Tower's Loft 22. He has also held solo exhibitions in London. Szabotage has also produced public work in Thailand and the UK.

He has continued to work as an interior designer in London and Hong Kong while working as an artist. He worked with Virgin Atlantic and Yoo in London and Hong Kong, associate designer director at Steve Leung and a Director of OSE & R & D for the Sands Hotel Group in Hong Kong. He is now a full-time artist based in Hong Kong.
