= 1925 London local elections =

Local elections in England

- 2 November 1925

All 1,366 councillors in all 28 metropolitan boroughs
	First party	Second party
Party	Municipal Reform	Labour
Councils	19	8
Councils +/–	▼4	▲4
Councillors	364	979

Local elections were held in London on 2 November 1925.

== Electoral arrangements ==
The County of London, outside of the City of London, was divided into 28 metropolitan boroughs. Each borough was divided into a number of multi-member electoral wards.

Councillors were elected to serve a three-year term, to go out of office in 1928. Polling took place on 2 November 1925.

== Results ==
The results for each borough were as follows:

Borough	Previous control	New control	Municipal Reform (Note: Includes all Conservative Party-aligned candidates who stood as Municipal Reform or another name.)	Labour	Others	Total	Details
Battersea	Labour	Labour	25	29		54	
Bermondsey	Labour	Labour	6	48		54	
Bethnal Green	No overall control	Labour	9	17	4 (Note: 4 Progressive)	30	
Camberwell	Municipal Reform	Municipal Reform	39	21		60	
Chelsea	Municipal Reform	Municipal Reform	36			36	
Deptford	No overall control	Labour	15	21		36	
Finsbury	Municipal Reform	Municipal Reform	39	15		54	
Fulham	Municipal Reform	Municipal Reform	37	3		40	
Greenwich	Municipal Reform	No overall control	15	15		30	
Hackney	Municipal Reform	Municipal Reform	60			60	
Hammersmith	Municipal Reform	Municipal Reform	33	3		36	
Hampstead	Municipal Reform	Municipal Reform	42			42	
Holborn	Municipal Reform	Municipal Reform	42			42	
Islington	Municipal Reform	Municipal Reform	53	7		60	
Kensington	Municipal Reform	Municipal Reform	54	6		60	
Lambeth	Municipal Reform	Municipal Reform	45	9	6 (Note: 6 Progressive)	60	
Lewisham	Municipal Reform	Municipal Reform	42			42	
Paddington	Municipal Reform	Municipal Reform	55	5		60	
Poplar	Labour	Labour	5	37		42	
Shoreditch	Municipal Reform	Labour	6	26	10 (Note: 10 Progressive)	42	
Southwark	Municipal Reform	Municipal Reform	44	16		60	Details
Stepney	Municipal Reform	Labour	17	40	3 (Note: 3 Independent)	60	
St Marylebone	Municipal Reform	Municipal Reform	51	9		60	
Stoke Newington	Municipal Reform	Municipal Reform	30			30	
St Pancras	Municipal Reform	Municipal Reform	47	13		60	
Wandsworth	Municipal Reform	Municipal Reform	60			60	
Westminster	Municipal Reform	Municipal Reform	60			60	
Woolwich	Labour	Labour	12	24		36	
Total			979	364	23	1,366	
