= 1953 London local elections =

Local elections in England

- 7 May 1953

All 1,356 councillors in all 28 metropolitan boroughs
	First party	Second party
Party	Labour	Conservative
Councils	19	9
Councils +/–	▲2	▼2
Councillors	876	470

Local elections were held in London on 7 May 1953.

== Electoral arrangements ==
The County of London, outside of the City of London, was divided into 28 metropolitan boroughs. Each borough was divided into a number of multi-member electoral wards.

Councillors were elected to serve a three-year term, to go out of office in 1956.

Ward boundaries were changed in Bermondsey (54 councillors reduced to 45), Bethnal Green, Camberwell, Finsbury (56 to 34), Greenwich (30 increased to 35), Hackney, Lambeth, St Marylebone, Stoke Newington and Woolwich (45 to 54). Total councillors were reduced by 17 from 1,373 to 1,356.

== Results ==
Two councils changed control, Stoke Newington and St Pancras, from Conservative to Labour.

The results for each borough were as follows:

Borough	Previous control	New control	Labour	Conservative	Ind. Labour	Total	Details
Battersea	Labour	Labour	37	18		55	
Bermondsey	Labour	Labour	45			45	Details
Bethnal Green	Labour	Labour	30			30	
Camberwell	Labour	Labour	46	14		60	
Chelsea	Conservative	Conservative	4	32		36	
Deptford	Labour	Labour	31	5		36	
Finsbury	Labour	Labour	29	5		34	
Fulham	Labour	Labour	27	13		40	
Greenwich	Labour	Labour	29	6		35	
Hackney	Labour	Labour	48			48	
Hammersmith	Labour	Labour	33	6		39	
Hampstead	Conservative	Conservative	6	36		42	
Holborn	Conservative	Conservative	4	38		42	
Islington	Labour	Labour	60			60	
Kensington	Conservative	Conservative	18	42		60	
Lambeth	Labour	Labour	51	9		60	
Lewisham	Conservative	Conservative	22	33		55	
Paddington	Conservative	Conservative	24	36		60	
Poplar	Labour	Labour	42			42	
Shoreditch	Labour	Labour	33			33	
Southwark	Labour	Labour	60			60	Details
Stepney	Labour	Labour	59		1	60	
St Marylebone	Conservative	Conservative	10	50		60	
Stoke Newington	Conservative	Labour	24	6		30	
St Pancras	Conservative	Labour	42	18		60	
Wandsworth	Conservative	Conservative	21	39		60	
Westminster	Conservative	Conservative		60		60	
Woolwich	Labour	Labour	41	13		54	
Total			876	470	1	1,356	
