= Norton Folgate (disambiguation) =

Norton Folgate or Liberty of Norton Folgate may refer to:

- Norton Folgate, a street in central London
- Liberty of Norton Folgate, an ancient administrative area in central London
- The Liberty of Norton Folgate, a music album by the British ska band Madness; a song in that album
