= Borough of Hackney =

Borough of Hackney could refer to:

- London Borough of Hackney
- Metropolitan Borough of Hackney (1900–1965)
