= South Hornsey =

Local government area in England,1865–1900

Coordinates: 51°34.2′N 0°5.5′W

- Area
  - 1894: 230 acres (0.93 km^{2})
- Population
  - 1891: 16,892
  - 1901: 16,703
- History
  - Origin: Part of Hornsey parish
  - Created: 1865
  - Abolished: 1900
  - Succeeded by: Metropolitan Borough of Stoke Newington
- Status: Local government district (1865—1894); Urban district (1894—1900); Civil parish (1894—1900)
- Government: South Hornsey Urban District Council
  - HQ: Council Offices, Milton Grove

A map showing the South Hornsey ward of Stoke Newington Metropolitan Borough as it appeared in 1916.

South Hornsey was a local government district in Middlesex, England from 1865 to 1900.

The district was formed in 1865 when the Local Government Act 1858 was adopted in the southern part of the parish of Hornsey. South Hornsey Local Board was formed to govern the area.

The majority of the district (172 acres) consisted of the Brownswood Park area south east of Finsbury Park. There were also two detached portions with a total area of 60 acres (240,000 m^{2}) which were surrounded by the parishes of Stoke Newington and Islington. Under the Local Government Act 1888, Islington and Stoke Newington became part of the County of London, and the outlying parts of South Hornsey became exclaves of Middlesex within the new county.

The Local Government Act 1894 reconstituted the area as an urban district, and South Hornsey Urban District Council replaced the local board. South Hornsey became a civil parish on 26 March 1896, being formed from the part of the parish of Hornsey in South Hornsey Urban District, on 1 April 1900 the parish was abolished and merged with Stoke Newington and Islington.

The London Government Act 1899 divided the County of London into metropolitan boroughs and provided for boundary revisions to provide more effective administration. Accordingly, South Hornsey Urban District was abolished in 1900, with the bulk of its area included in the Metropolitan Borough of Stoke Newington (with a population of 16,703), and a small unpopulated part to the neighbouring Borough of Islington. South Hornsey became a ward in the new metropolitan borough, electing nine of the thirty council members.

The records of South Hornsey Local Board and Urban District are held by the archives department of the London Borough of Hackney.

== See also ==
- South Hornsey (ward), an electoral ward in Haringey corresponding to a distinct area
