= Coat of arms of the London Borough of Hackney =

- Armiger: London Borough of Hackney
- Adopted: 1969
- Crest: On a wreath Argent and Gules on a mount Vert a representation of the tower of the ancient parish church of St. Augustine Hackney Proper.
- Shield: Per fess in chief per fess Sable and Argent a Maltese cross per fess Argent and Gules between two oak trees eradicated Or fructed Gules and in the base Gules three bells Or the whole within a bordure barruly wavy Argent and Azure

The coat of arms of the London Borough of Hackney is the official heraldic arms of the London Borough of Hackney, England. The coat of arms were granted on 25 July 1969.

The present arms is mainly based on the arms of the former Metropolitan Borough of Hackney, from which the cross and the horizontal partition ("per fess", as it is called in blazons) in the upper field of the shield is taken. The eight-pointed Maltese cross is for the Orders of the Knights Templar and Knights of St. John; the Knights Templar wore a red Maltese Cross on white surcoats and mantles and the Knights of St. John wore black surcoats and mantles with a white Maltese Cross on them. Both orders have at different times in history been the owner of the Hackney manor. The bordure of the shield has waves representing the waterways, rivers and canals around the borough; heraldic waves like this were also prominent in the coat of arms of the former Metropolitan Borough of Hackney, where they made up the lower half of the shield.

The oak trees comes from the coat of arms of the former Metropolitan Borough of Stoke Newington, symbols of the formerly forested area in the north of the borough. The oak trees are "fructed gules", which means their fruits (i.e. acorns for an oak tree) are visible and should be coloured red.

The former Metropolitan Borough of Shoreditch had no official coat of arms, so in the arms of the London borough, Shoreditch is represented by the three bells in the lower field. They in turn represent the church bells of St. Leonard's Church, Shoreditch (these Shoreditch bells are known from the nursery rhyme "Oranges and Lemons"), but their number of three stands for the three metropolitan boroughs which were merged to form the present London borough.

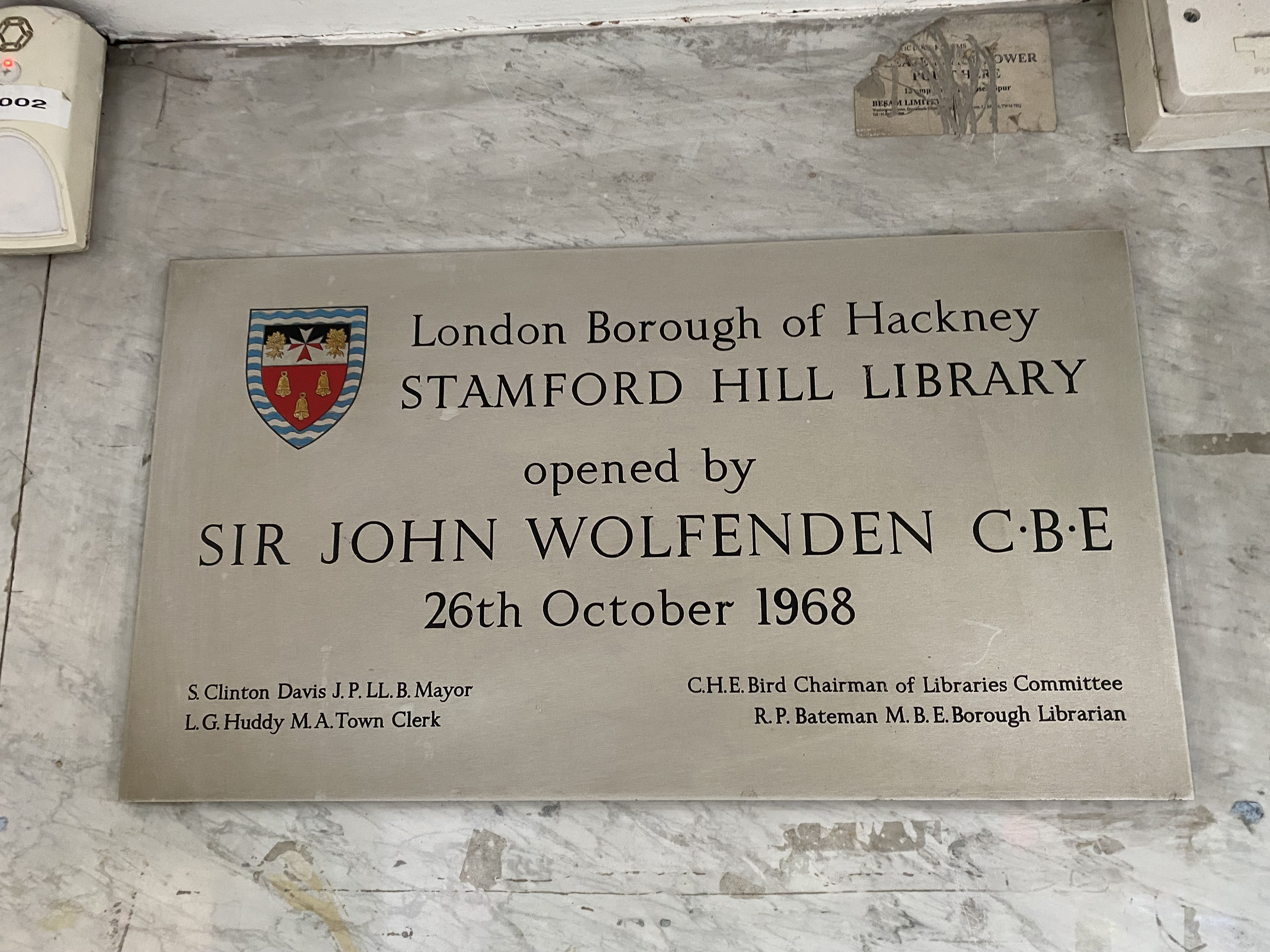
The shield of the London Borough of Hackney's coat of arms displayed on a plaque at Stamford Hill Library

The crest is almost the same as for the former Metropolitan Borough of Hackney, the only difference is that it stands on a small hill in the current arms. It is a representation of the remaining tower of St. Augustine's Church, part of Hackney's ancient parish church located in the historical centre of Hackney. The image is a representation of it, it is not a picture of it, because heraldic arms are symbols and never depicts actual buildings or other actual things. The green hill on which the tower stands, represents the island in the river Lea, where Hackney was founded, the island is supposed to have had the name Hacon's Eyot, from which the name Hackney is thought by some to be derived. The tower was also present in a field on the shield in the coat of arms of the former Metropolitan Borough of Hackney.

The motto is Justitia turris nostra, Latin for "Justice is our Tower" "

== Blazon ==
Arms: Per fess in chief per fess Sable and Argent a Maltese Cross per fess Argent and Gules between two Oak Trees eradicated Or fructed Gules and in the base Gules three Bells Or the whole within a Bordure barruly wavy Argent and Azure. Crest: On a Wreath Argent and Gules on a Mount Vert a representation of the Tower of the Ancient Parish Church of St. Augustine Hackney proper.

== Badge ==
On an Ellipse barruly wavy Argent and Azure a Delf per fess Sable and Argent fimbriated Or charged with a Maltese Cross per fess Argent and Gules ensigned by a representation of the Tower of the Ancient Parish Church of St. Augustine Hackney proper.

== See also ==
- Armorial of London
