= Lonsdale Road Reservoir =

Reservoir in Barnes, London, England

Coordinates: 51.4824°N 0.2473°W

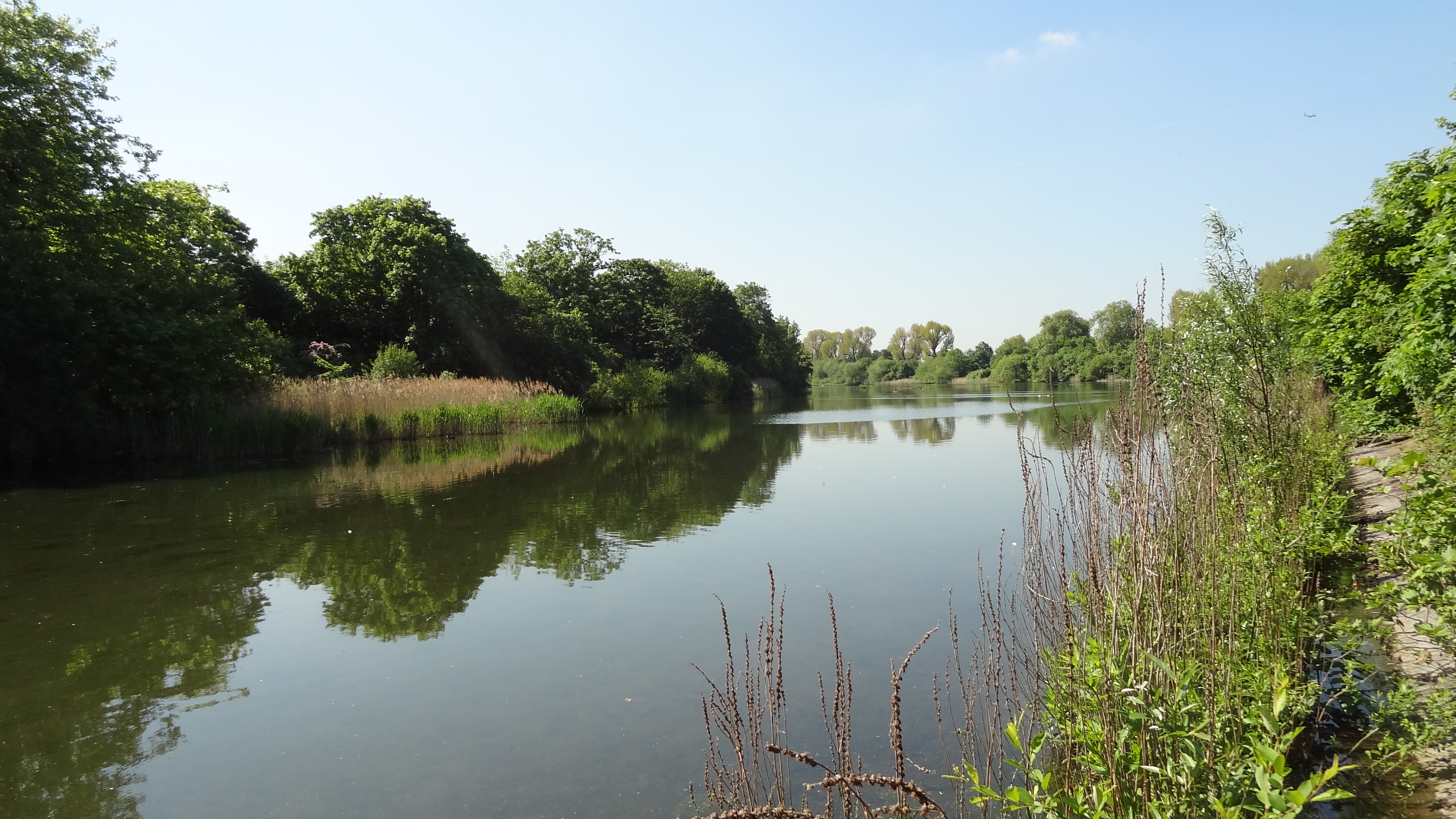

Lonsdale Road Reservoir (also the Leg of Mutton Reservoir or Leg o' Mutton Reservoir) is a disused reservoir in Barnes in the London Borough of Richmond upon Thames. It is an 8.2-hectare (20-acre) local nature reserve and Site of Borough Importance for Nature Conservation, Grade 1, owned and managed by Richmond upon Thames London Borough Council.

== History ==
Putney detached and the reservoir in 1898

Prior to construction of the reservoir it was meadowland by the riverside, known as Westmead or Lotmead, as it was divided into 'lots' of land. It formed a parish exclave of Putney, surrounded by the parish of Barnes. It was also known as Putney detached. The land was purchased by the West Middlesex Waterworks Company and the reservoir was built in 1838. Putney became part of the County of London in 1889 which caused the detached part to become a county exclave surrounded by Surrey. The London Government Act 1899 made provision for this and Putney detached was transferred to the parish of Barnes on 1 April 1901.

The reservoir was decommissioned in 1960. Developers proposed to build housing and a shopping centre on the site, but this was strongly opposed by local residents. They suggested that it should become a nature reserve instead, and their proposal was accepted. Richmond upon Thames London Borough Council purchased the area from Thames Water in 1970 and in 1990 it was designated a local nature reserve.

== Ecology ==
Breeding birds include pochards, which are nationally scarce, mute swans, great crested grebe and grey herons. There are many more waterfowl in the winter. The site is also important for bats, and amphibians include the protected great crested newt. Aquatic plants include bogbean and frogbit, both of which are rare in London.

== Access ==
There is a mile-long perimeter path round the reservoir, which can be accessed from the Thames Path, Ferry Lane and Lonsdale Road.
