= Liberty of Norton Folgate =

Land area in Middlesex, England

Coordinates: 51.5211°N 0.0788°W

Norton Folgate
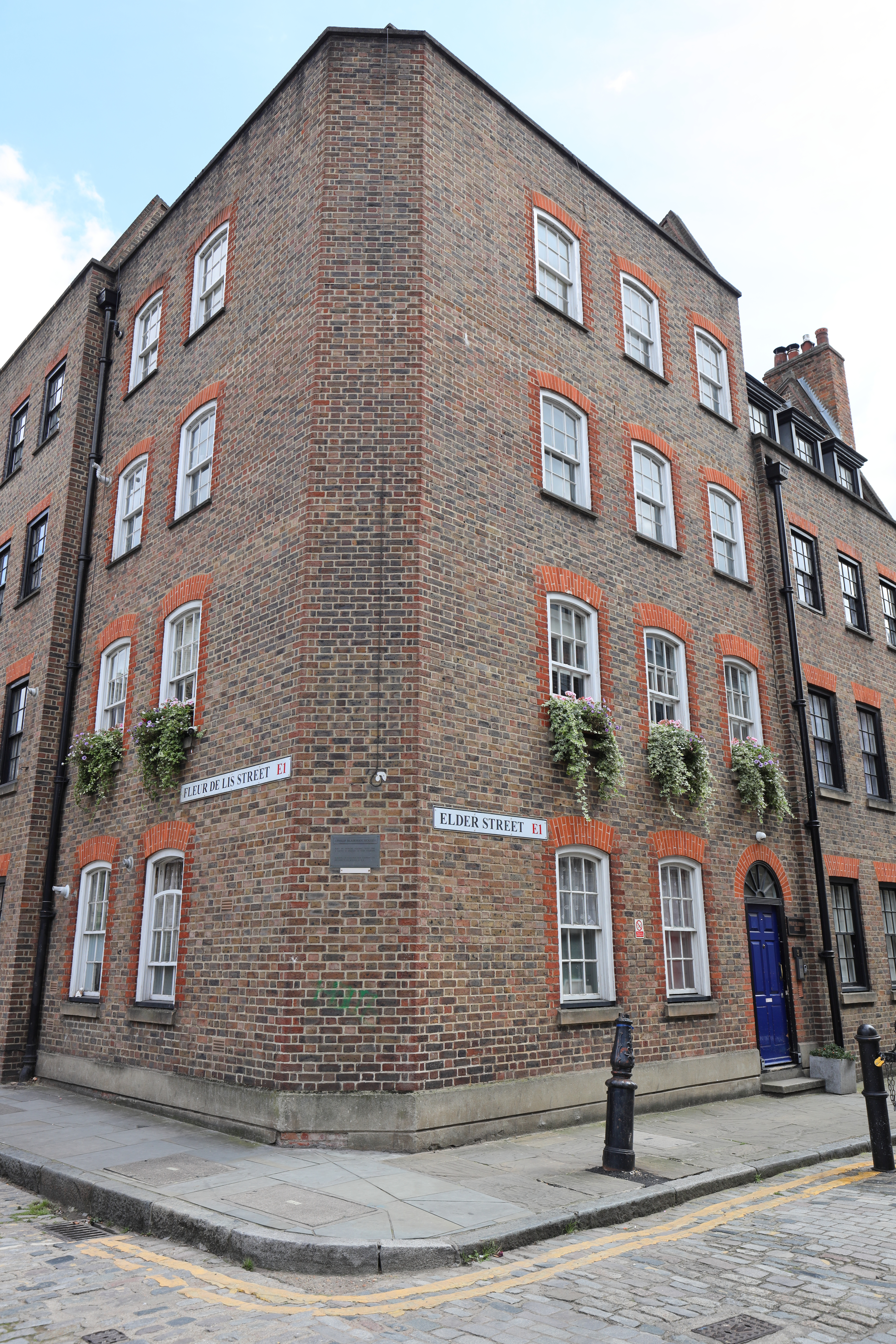

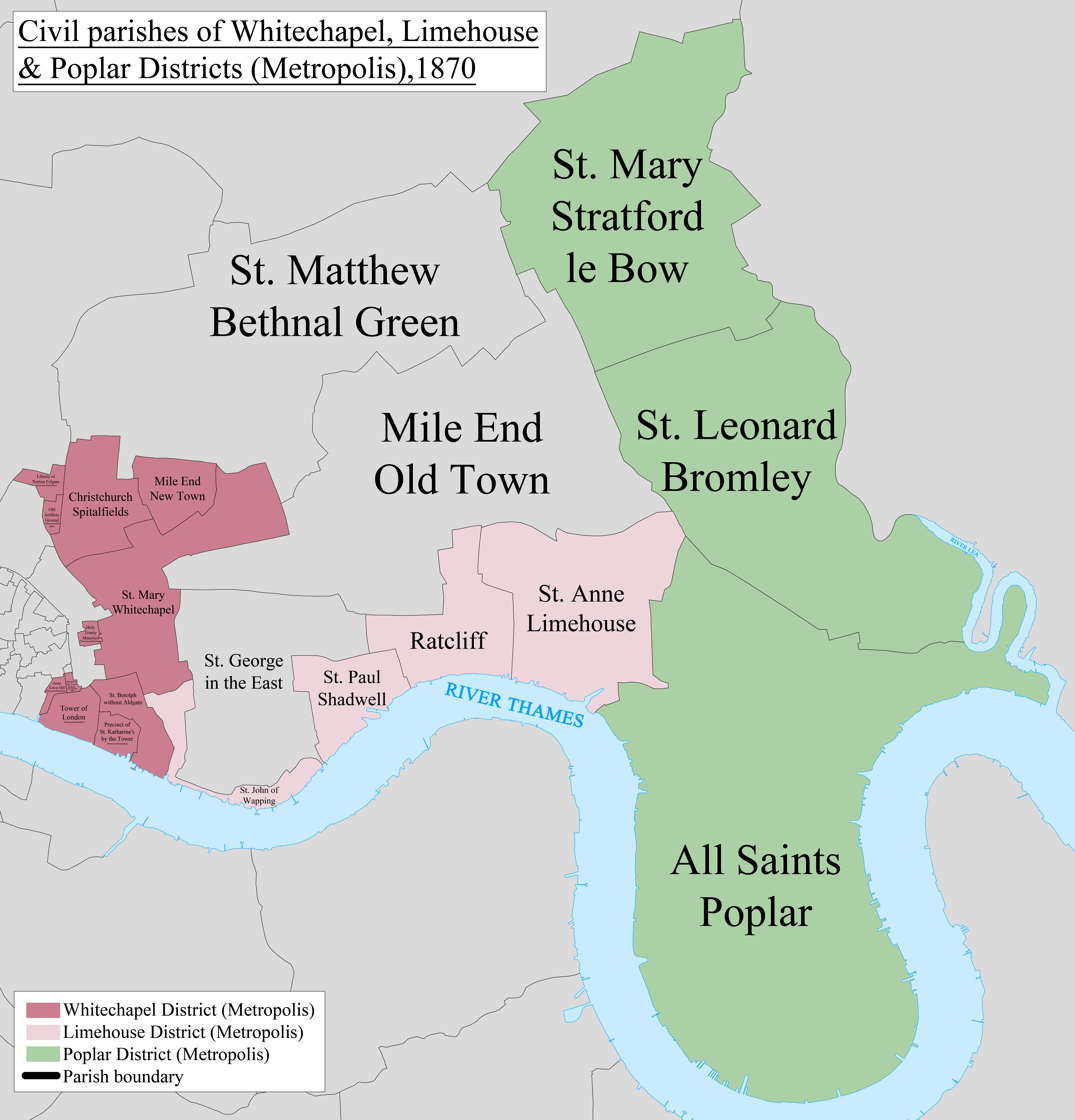
- Norton Folgate in 1681
- Area
  - 1901: 8 acres (0.032 km^{2})
- Population
  - 1801: 1,752
  - 1851: 1,771
  - 1901: 1,663
- Density
  - 1901: 208/acre
- History
  - Abolished: 1900 (liberty); 1921 (civil parish)
  - Succeeded by: Metropolitan Borough of Shoreditch; Metropolitan Borough of Stepney
- Status: Liberty (until 1900); Extra-parochial area (until 1858); Civil parish (1858—1921)
  - HQ: Norton Folgate Street (c.1544-1744); White Lion Street (1744-1901)

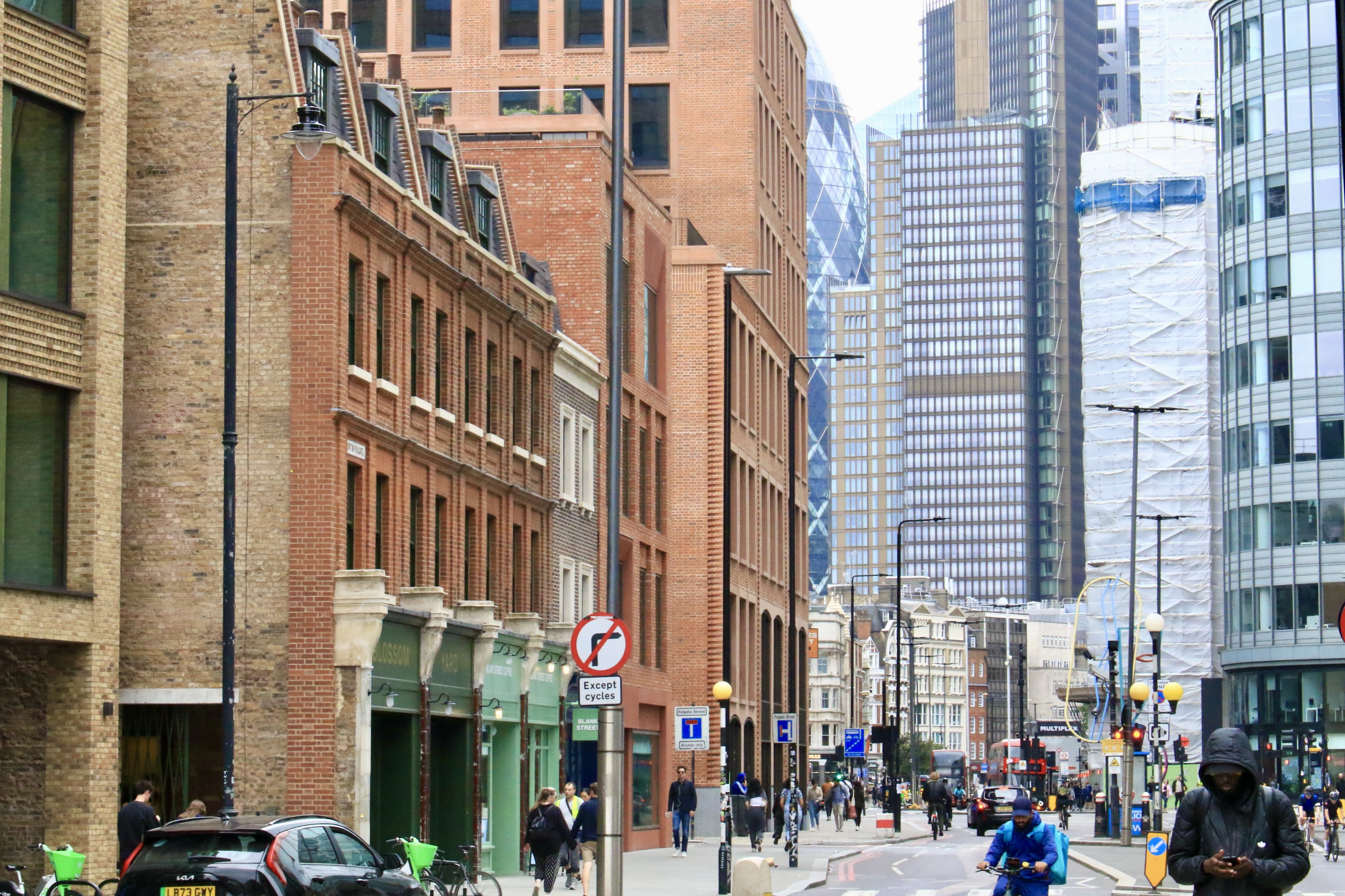
Looking south along Norton Folgate street in 2024.

Norton Folgate was a liberty in Middlesex, England; adjacent to the City of London in what would become the East End of London. At the 1911 census (one of the last before the abolition of the parish), Norton Folgate had a population of 1476.

It was located between the Bishopsgate ward of the City of London to the south, the parish of St Leonard, Shoreditch to the north and the parish of Spitalfields to the east.

The district, which was a component of the Tower Division, also known as the Tower Hamlets, ceased to exist when it merged into the Metropolitan Borough of Stepney in 1900. Following boundary changes in the 1990s, its former area is now divided between the City of London and the London Borough of Tower Hamlets.

== Toponymy ==
The name is recorded c. 1110 as Nortune and means 'north farmstead'. It is formed from the Old English norþ and tūn, with the affix "Folgate" perhaps derived from the manorial family name Foliot. This possibly refers to Gilbert Foliot, Bishop of London or Richard Foliot, a canon of St Paul's Cathedral. An alternative explanation found in The National Gazetteer from 1868 describes Folgate as derived "from the Saxon word Foldweg, a highway, in allusion to the old Roman Road (Ermine Street) which passed through this place". It is remembered in the street of Norton Folgate and the 2009 album by the band Madness, called The Liberty of Norton Folgate.

== History ==
Norton Folgate originated as the land occupied by the inner precinct of the Priory and Hospital of St. Mary Spital. The priory was dissolved during the Reformation, but the land, which reverted to the Crown, retained its status as an extra-parochial liberty. Within the 8.7 acres (35,000 m^{2}) of the former liberty are Folgate Street (formerly White Lyon Yard or White Lion Street), Spital Square, Elder Street, Fleur de Lis Street and Blossom Street.

Maps from the 18th century indicate that an area to the west of Bishopsgate was also part of Norton Folgate but was probably part of the broader manor and not part of the liberty. Its original extent was from what is now Worship Street (then called Hog Lane) in a narrow corridor that ran parallel to Bishopsgate as far south as Liverpool Street Station. By the 19th century it had been reduced to a small plot between Primrose Street and Worship Street. It has been suggested that Norton Folgate can be identified as the nine acres which the canons of St Paul's held at Bishopsgate (ad portam Episcopi) at the time of the Domesday Survey and was held similarly during the time of Edward the Confessor.

In the 18th century breweries in Hog Lane and White Lion Street produced porter. The Gas Light and Coke Company established works, also known as the 'Curtain Road Works' from about 1812 when it was contracted to light Bishopsgate and supply the surrounding area with gas. The site was cramped, and riddled with springs. The company applied novel chemistry (devised by Fredrick Winsor) on an industrial scale. The works operated from about 1820 to 1871, when Beckton Gas Works took over the supply for much of London. The site was then used as a coal siding – for coaling trains at Broad Street and Liverpool Street. After that it was used as a yard for taxis before it was redeveloped in about 2000.

Norton Folgate was once the residence of the playwright Christopher Marlowe. The theatrical association continued, with the construction in 1837 of the City of London Theatre by the architect Samuel Beazley. The theatre specialised in "domestic" and temperance drama, and closed in 1868. Performances included The Pickwick Papers between March and April 1837; and Nicholas Nickleby in November and December 1838.

The liberty existed until October 1900, although it continued to have nominal existence as a civil parish until 1921. The area to the west of Bishopsgate was removed and became part of the parish and borough of Shoreditch (which in turn became part of the London Borough of Hackney in 1965). Since a revision of boundaries in the 1990s this area is now part of the City of London. The remaining parish to the east of Bishopsgate formed part of the Metropolitan Borough of Stepney until it was abolished on 1 April 1921, absorbed by the parish of Whitechapel.

In 2008, in opposition to a plan to demolish the Light Bar (built as a power station for the Great Eastern Railway) in order to build an office block, local activists claimed that documents in the council archives showed that the abolition of the Liberty of Norton Folgate in 1900 was technically invalid and that it still existed.

== Government ==
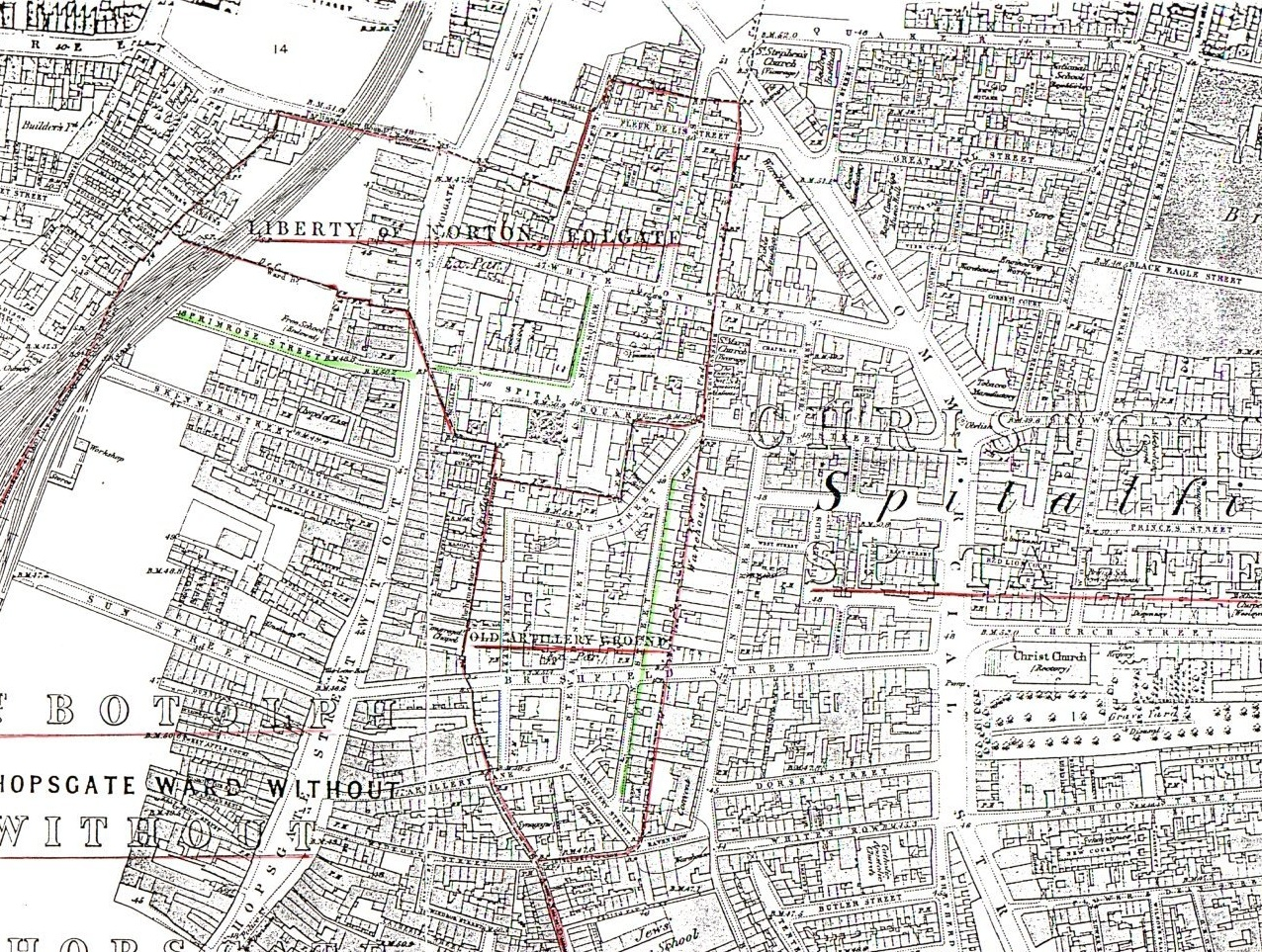
Liberty of Norton Folgate marked on an Ordnance Survey sheet, 1873

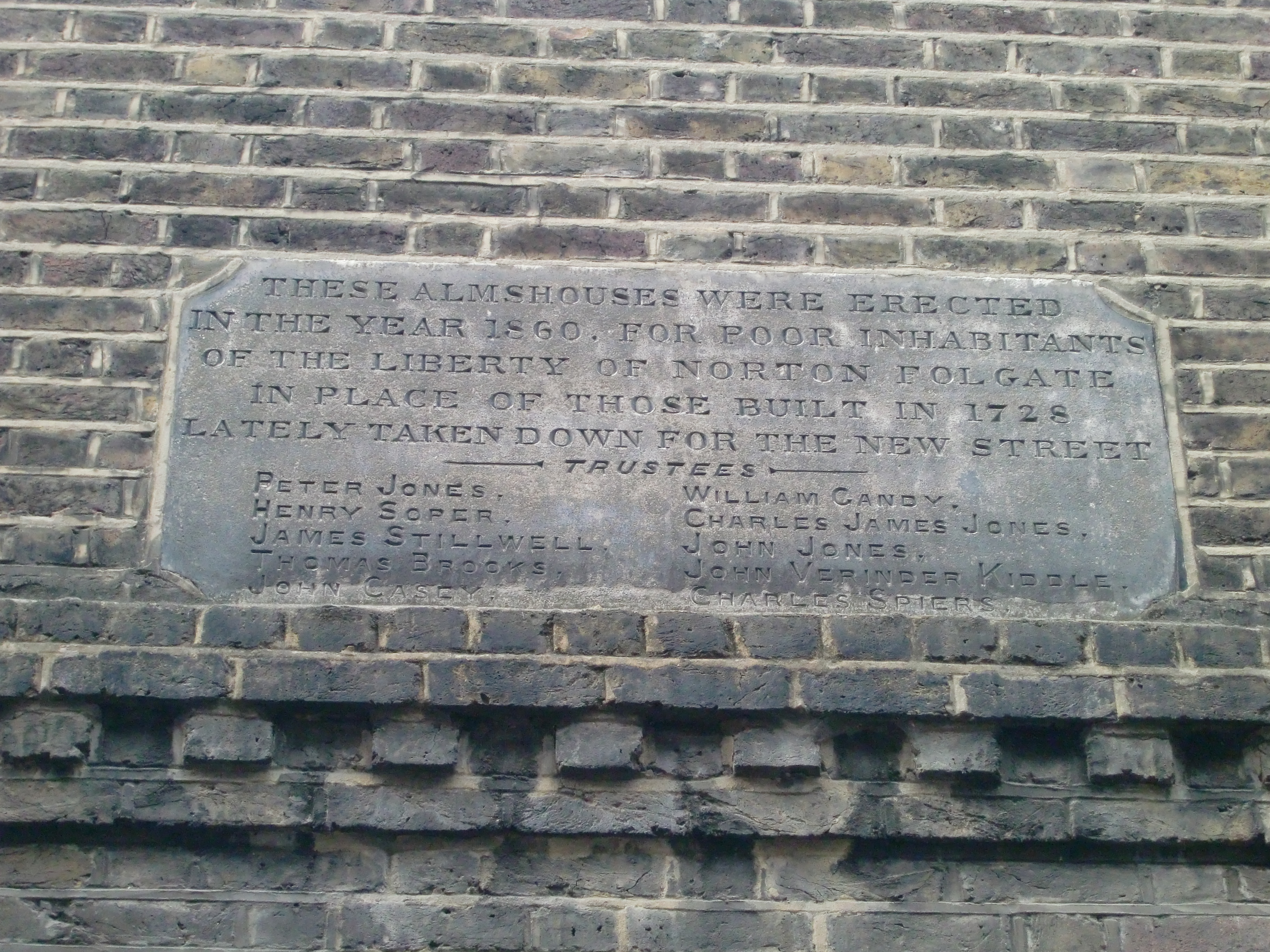
Plaque on Norton Folgate Almshouses, opened 1860, listing ten trustees. The buildings replaced earlier almshouses of 1728, and stand in Puma Court (formerly Red Lion Court), on the east side of Commercial Street, and therefore outside the boundaries of the Liberty.

In 1732 the Parish Clerks of Shoreditch said that "All the Affairs of the Liberty are managed by the Ancients, who are in the Nature of a Vestry". These "ancients" or "ancient inhabitants" may have originally been clerics but after the reformation were probably established landowners. Later records indicate that these "ancient inhabitants" took turns to occupy various offices including:

- Headborough (a sort of Mayor)
- 2 x Overseers of the Poor (who managed rents)
- Constable (supervising three Beadles)
- Scavenger (who managed street cleaning)

The ten "ancient inhabitants" were obliged to fill these offices unless they paid a fine excusing themselves. The Ancient Inhabitants appear to have replaced their numbers through co-opting residents of the Liberty. After a Local Act these ancient offices were replaced by a more democratic Board of Trustees who administered the Liberty from the Court House located in the centre of Norton Folgate Street (now called Norton Folgate). These twenty trustees were responsible for establishing and maintaining civic amenities such as sewerage, lighting and the maintenance of pavements. In 1743 the ancient Court House was pulled down and the courts of the manor were later held in a building on the north side of White Lion Street (later No. 1 Folgate Street) leased by the inhabitants and overseers of the liberty from 1744 onwards. This building was also used for meetings of the trustees until 1900; it was demolished in the 1960s.

The liberty was one of the components of the Tower Division, also known as the Tower Hamlets, an area best known for its military association with the Tower of London, but which also had a civil role.

In 1855 the liberty became part of the Whitechapel District. In 1897 the trustees contemplated agitating, together with the neighbouring Liberty of the Old Artillery Ground, for inclusion in the City of London, but did not do so. In 1900 the liberty became merged in the Metropolitan Borough of Stepney and the last meeting of the trustees took place on 24 October of that year. The last chairman of the Board of Trustees of the Liberty was William Chillingworth.

== Population and area ==
The liberty of Norton Folgate covered 8 acres (3 ha). The population as recorded in the Census was:

Liberty of Norton Folgate 1801-1901

Year	1801	1811	1821	1831	1841	1851	1861	1871	1881	1891	1901
Population	1,752	1,716	1,896	1,918	1,674	1,771	1,873	1,550	1,528	1,449	1,663

== See also ==
- Stepney Historical Trust
