= Norton Folgate =

Street in the City of London

Coordinates: 51.5211°N 0.0788°W

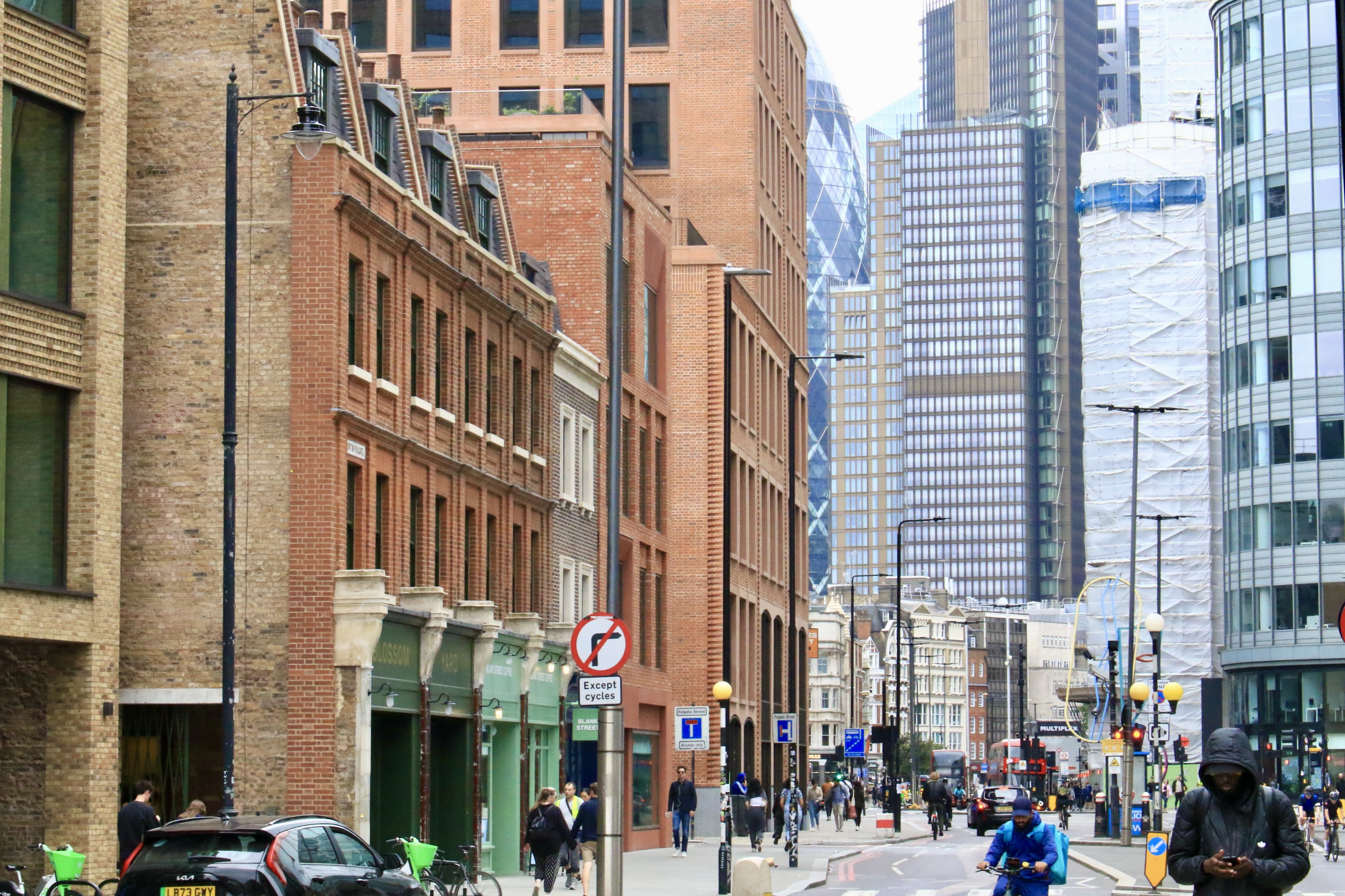
Looking south along Norton Folgate, 2024.

Norton Folgate is a short length of street in London, connecting Bishopsgate with Shoreditch High Street, on the northern edge of the City of London.

It constitutes a short section of the A10 road, the former Roman Ermine Street. Its name is a reminder of the tiny ancient Liberty of Norton Folgate situated in and around the area.

The nearest London Underground station is Liverpool Street, also a National Rail mainline railway station. The nearest London Overground station is Shoreditch High Street.

It lends its name to a character played by Samuel Barnett in the ongoing Big Finish Productions Torchwood audio drama series.

In July 2015, more than 500 people protested against the demolition of the old buildings in historic Norton Folgate neighbourhood to make way for new developments. People travelled from across the country to ask for the restoration of the old structures rather than offering them to the international property investment market.
