= Metropolitan Borough of Islington =

Former local authority of London, England

Coordinates: 51.5416°N 0.1022°W

Islington St Mary
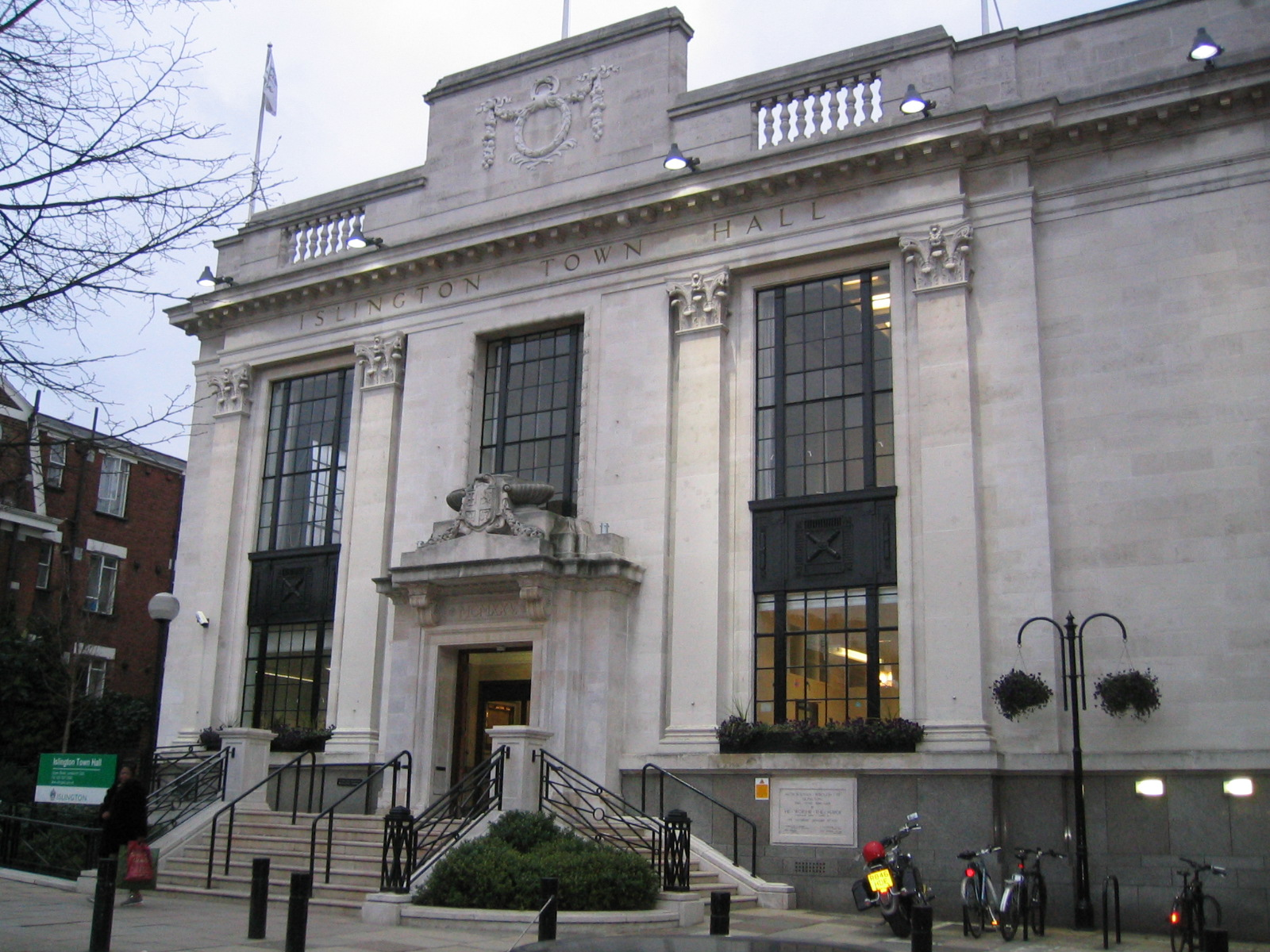
- Islington Town Hall

- Islington within the County of London
- Population
  - 1961: 235,632
- History
  - Origin: Ancient parish
  - Abolished: 1965
  - Succeeded by: London Borough of Islington
- Status: Civil parish (until 1965); Metropolitan borough (1900–1965)
- Government: Vestry of the Parish of Islington (until 1900); Islington Borough Council (1900–1965)
  - HQ: Town Hall, Upper Street (1923–1965)
  - Motto: Deus Per Omnia (God pervades all things)
- Coat of arms of the borough council
- Map of borough boundary

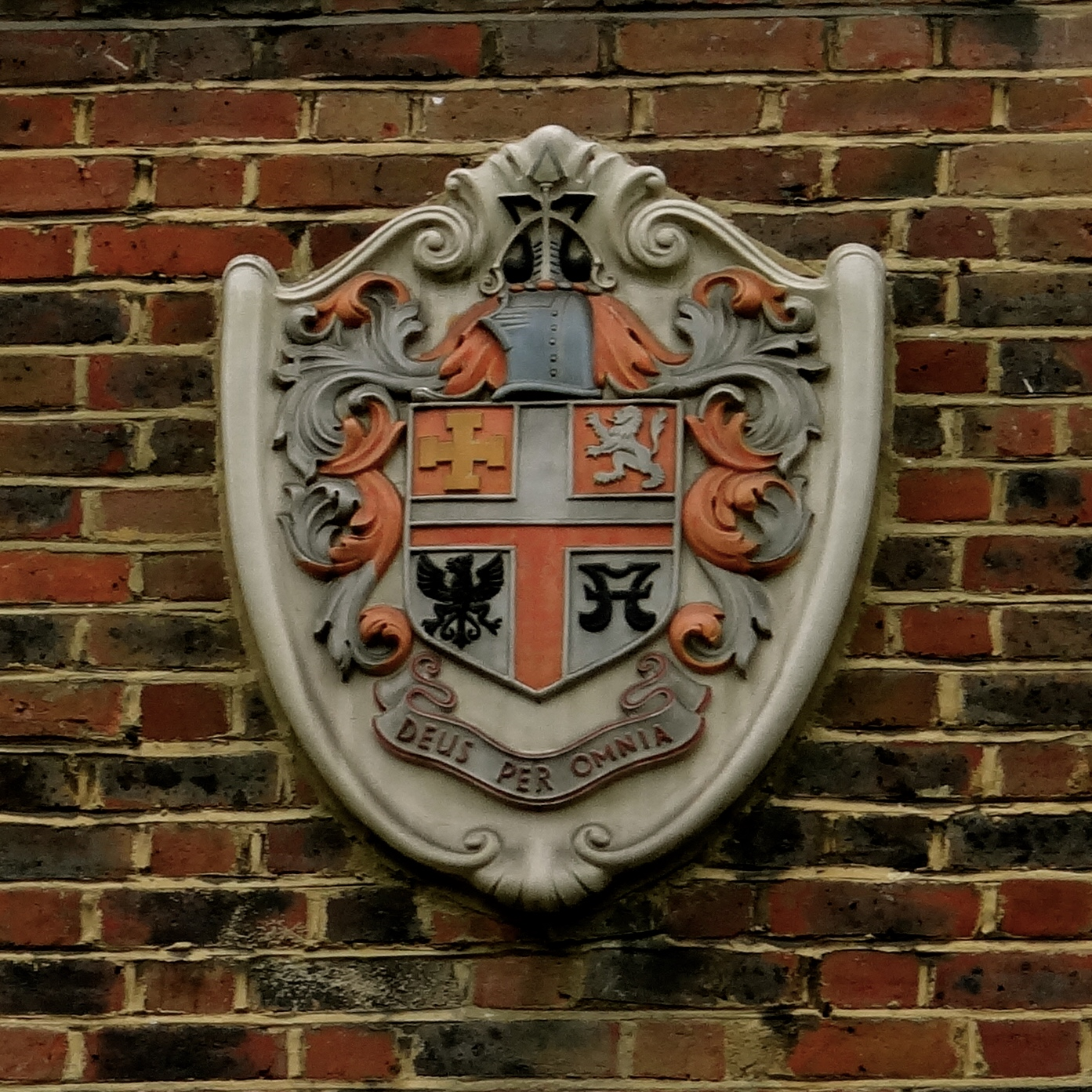
Coat of arms shown affixed to Orwell Court, municipal housing in Petherton Road

Islington was a civil parish and metropolitan borough in London, England. It was an ancient parish within the county of Middlesex, and formed part of The Metropolis from 1855. The parish was transferred to the County of London in 1889 and became a metropolitan borough in 1900. It was amalgamated with the Metropolitan Borough of Finsbury to form the London Borough of Islington in Greater London in 1965.

== Geography ==
The borough comprised the districts of Pentonville (also partly in Clerkenwell/Finsbury), Islington (also partly in Clerkenwell/Finsbury), Barnsbury, Lower Holloway, Holloway, Tufnell Park (also partly in St Pancras), Archway, Highbury, and Canonbury.

The neighbouring boroughs were Finsbury, Hackney, Stoke Newington, Shoreditch, St Pancras.

== Governance ==
The parish of St Mary Islington operated as an open vestry. It was added to the bills of mortality area in 1636. The vestry was incorporated by the Metropolis Management Act 1855 as an administrative vestry in the metropolitan area managed by Metropolitan Board of Works. On 21 March 1889 the MBW was abolished and the parish was transferred from the County of Middlesex to the newly formed County of London. Because of the reforms directed by the London Government Act 1899, on 1 November 1900 the vestry was abolished and replaced by the Islington Metropolitan Borough Council. The act allowed for the London County Council (1889-1965) and the metropolitan boroughs to transfer powers to and from each other, if both the county council and a majority of the boroughs agreed. Unlike municipal boroughs which received a grant of a charter of incorporation, the London metropolitan boroughs had no charters, being created by act of parliament.

The first election of councillors was set for 1 November 1900, with a third of the councillors going out of office each year. The borough was divided into wards, with three councillors for each ward. There were aldermen at a ratio of one to every six councillors. The chairman of the council received the title of mayor.

== Services ==
The vestry started work on an electricity supply service at Eden Grove in 1894, which became operational in 1896. New streets were lit with electric light from 1906. In 1936 electricity showrooms were opened at the corner of Holloway Road and Camden Road. The electric supply service became part of the London Electricity Board following the Electricity Act 1947.

== Poor law ==
Islington (Poor Relief, etc.) Act 1776
- Act of Parliament
- Parliament of Great Britain
- Long title: An Act for the better Relief and Employment of the Poor of the Parish of Saint Mary, Islington, in the County of Middlesex; and for building a Workhouse for the said Parish.
- Citation: 17 Geo. 3. c. 5
- Territorial extent: Great Britain

Dates
- Royal assent: 3 March 1777
- Commencement: 31 October 1776 (Note: Start of session.)
- Repealed: 17 June 1824
Other legislation
Amended by	St. Mary Islington Poor Relief Act 1802
Repealed by	St. Mary Islington Poor Relief and Workhouse Act 1813; St. Mary Islington Improvement Act 1824

Status: Repealed

Text of statute as originally enacted

St. Mary Islington Poor Relief Act 1802
- Act of Parliament
- Parliament of the United Kingdom
- Long title: An Act to amend and render more effectual an Act, made in the Seventeenth Year of His present Majesty's Reign, for the better Relief and Employment of the Poor of the Parish of St Mary Islington, in the County of Middlesex.
- Citation: 42 Geo. 3. c. xxviii
- Territorial extent: United Kingdom

Dates
- Royal assent: 15 April 1802
- Commencement: 15 April 1802 (Note: The Acts of Parliament (Commencement) Act 1793.)
- Repealed: 17 June 1824
Other legislation
Amends	Islington (Poor Relief, etc.) Act 1776
Repealed by	St. Mary Islington Improvement Act 1824

Status: Repealed

Text of statute as originally enacted

It was a local act parish so it did not come under the Poor Law Amendment Act 1834 (4 & 5 Will. 4. c. 76) and the vestry continued to be responsible for poor relief, instead of a separately elected board of guardians. This anomaly was rectified by the Metropolitan Poor Act 1867 (30 & 31 Vict. c. 6). The parish was large enough in terms of population to avoid being grouped into a poor law union and remained a single parish for this purpose.

== Town Hall ==
Islington Town Hall on Upper Street was the headquarters of Metropolitan Borough of Islington and remains the headquarters of its successor body, Islington London Borough Council.

== Population and area ==
The metropolitan borough was conterminous with the Vestry authority, when it was formed in 1900. Statistics compiled by the London County Council, in 1901 show the population growth in London, over the preceding century.

The area of the borough in 1901 was 3,091 acres (12.5 km^{2}). The populations recorded in National Censuses were:

Islington Vestry 1801–1899

Year	1801	1811	1821	1831	1841	1851	1861	1871	1881	1891
Population	10,212	15,065	22,417	37,316	55,690	95,329	155,341	213,778	282,865	319,143

Metropolitan Borough 1900–1961

Year	1901	1911	1921	1931	1941	1951	1961
Population	334,981	327,403	330,737	321,795		235,632	228,345

By comparison, after amalgamation with Finsbury, to form the modern London Borough of Islington, the combined area became 3,672 acres (14.9 km^{2}); in 2005, this had a population of 182,600, or a population density of 12,288/km^{2}. In 1901 Islington the population density was 26,778/km^{2}.

== Archival records ==
Islington Local History Centre holds records of the Metropolitan Borough of Islington, including council and committee minutes, rate books and publications.

== Politics ==
A map showing the wards of Islington Metropolitan Borough as they appeared in 1916.

Under the Metropolis Management Act 1855 any parish that exceeded 2,000 ratepayers was to be divided into wards; as such the incorporated vestry of St Mary Islington was divided into six wards (electing vestrymen): No. 1 or Upper Holloway (9), No. 2 or Lower Holloway (12), No. 3 or Highbury (15), No. 4 or Thornhill (18), No. 5 or Barnsbury (18), No. 6 or St Mary's (15), No. 7 or Canonbury (15) and No. 8 or St Peter's (18).

In 1896 as its population had increased the incorporated vestry was re-divided into eleven wards (electing vestrymen): No. 1 or Tufnell (12), No. 2 or Upper Holloway (12), No. 3 or Tollington (9), No. 4 or Lower Holloway (15), No. 5 or West Highbury (15), No. 6 or East Highbury (12), No. 7 or Thornhill (9), No. 8 or Barnsbury (6), No. 9 or St Mary's (9), No. 10 or Canonbury (9) and No. 11 or St Peter's (12).

The metropolitan borough was divided into eleven wards for elections: Barnsbury, Canonbury, Highbury, Lower Holloway, Mildmay, St Mary, St Peter, Thornhill, Tollington, Tufnell and Upper Holloway.

=== Parliament constituency ===
For elections to Parliament, the borough was divided into four constituencies:

- Islington East
- Islington North
- Islington South
- Islington West

In 1950 the borough's representation was reduced to three seats:

- Islington East
- Islington North
- Islington South West

== See also ==
- Finsbury Town Hall
- Metropolis Management Act 1855
- London Government Act 1899
- London Government Act 1963
- London Borough of Islington
