= London Borough of Hackney =

Coordinates: 51°33′00″N 0°03′30″W

Hackney
- London borough
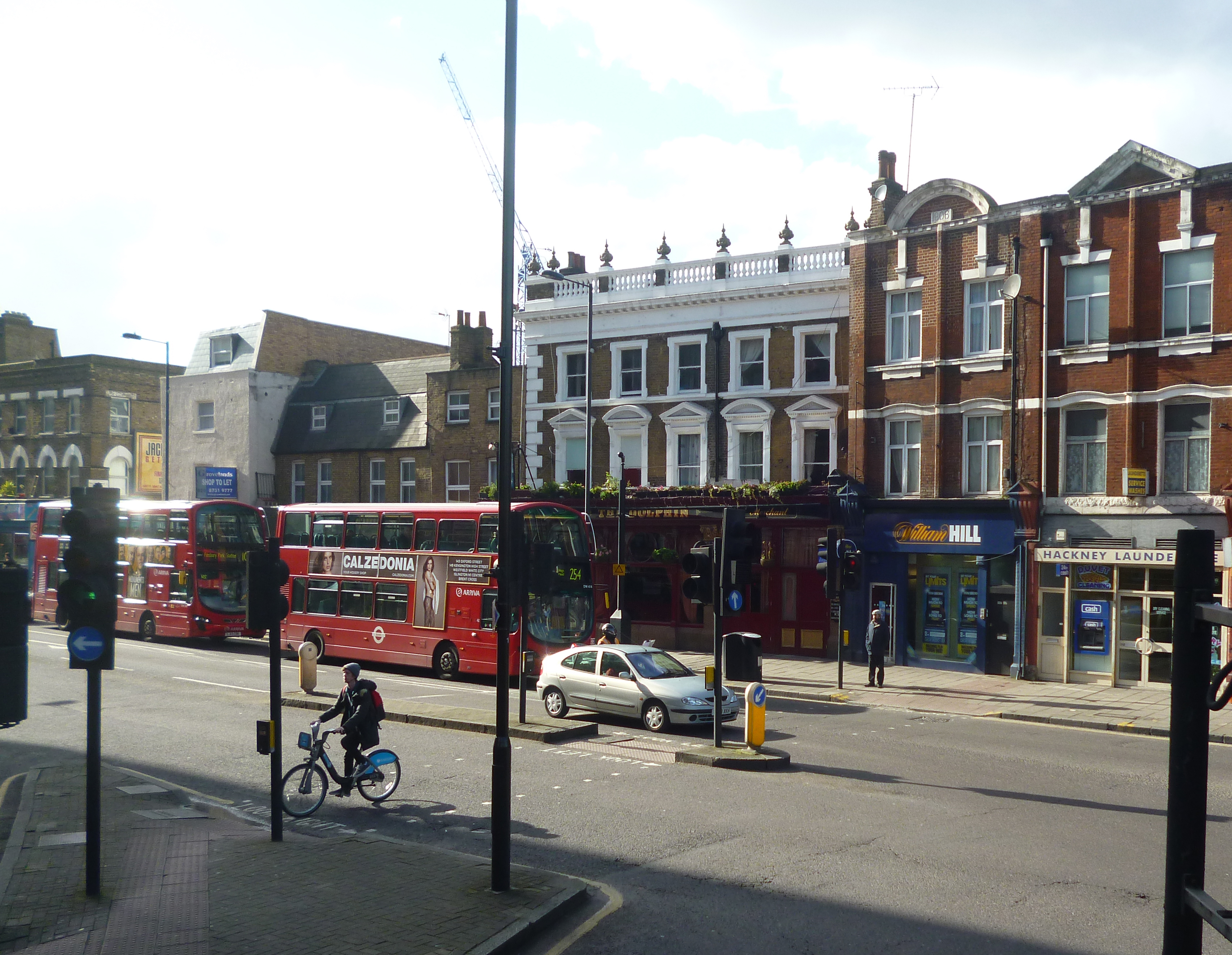
- Mare Street in Hackney

- Flag Coat of arms Council logo

- Hackney shown within Greater London
- Sovereign state: United Kingdom
- Constituent country: England
- Region: London
- Ceremonial county: Greater London
- Created: 1 April 1965
- Admin HQ: Mare Street, Hackney

Government
  - Type: London borough council
  - Body: Hackney London Borough Council
  - Mayor: Zoë Garbett (Green)
  - London Assembly: Sem Moema (Labour) AM for North East
  - MPs: Diane Abbott (Labour); Meg Hillier (Labour); David Lammy (Labour); Emily Thornberry (Labour)

Area
  - Total: 7.36 sq mi (19.06 km^{2})
  - Rank: 291st (of 296)

Population (2025)
  - Total: 266,241
  - Rank: 71st (of 296)
  - Density: 36,180/sq mi (13,970/km^{2})
- Time zone: UTC (GMT)
  - Summer (DST): UTC+1 (BST)
- Postcodes: E, EC, N
- ISO 3166 code: GB-HCK
- ONS code: 00AM
- GSS code: E09000012
- Police: Metropolitan Police
- Website: hackney.gov.uk

The London Borough of Hackney (/ˈhækni/ HAK-nee) is a London borough in Inner London, England. The historical and administrative heart of Hackney is Mare Street. The borough is named after Hackney, its principal district. Southern and eastern parts of the borough are popularly regarded as being part of east London that spans some of the traditional East End of London with the northwest belonging to north London.

The London Plan issued by the Greater London Authority assigns whole boroughs to sub-regions for statutory monitoring, engagement and resource allocation purposes. The 2011 iteration of this plan assigned Hackney to the 'East' sub-region, while the 2008 and 2004 versions assigned the borough to "North" and "East" sub-regions respectively. The modern borough was formed in 1965 by the merger of the Metropolitan Borough of Hackney with the much smaller Metropolitan Boroughs of Stoke Newington and Shoreditch.

Hackney is bounded by Islington to the west, Haringey to the north, Waltham Forest to the north-east, Newham to the east, Tower Hamlets to the south-east and the City of London to the south-west. Hackney was one of the host boroughs of the London Olympics in 2012, with several of the Queen Elizabeth Olympic Park venues falling within its boundaries.

== History ==
=== Place name origin ===
In the 13th century the name appears as Hackenaye or Hacquenye, but no certain derivation is advanced. The Concise Oxford Dictionary of Place Names (fourth edition) discusses the origin of the name. The first surviving records of the place name are as Hakney (1231) and Hakeneye (1242 and 1294). The "ey" suffix almost certainly refers to an island; the dictionary favours the interpretation that Hackney means "Haka's island", with Haka being a notable local person and the island (or inaccessible place surrounded by marshes) lying close to the River Lea. This was once a much wilder place than today.

The dictionary suggests that the Hack element may also derive from:

- The Old English "Haecc", meaning a hatch – an entrance to a woodland or common.
- Or alternatively from "Haca", meaning a hook, and in this context, a bend of the river.

Given the island context, the "hatch" option is unlikely to be correct, so the favoured "Haka's Island" or the "Island on the bend" seem more likely.

The place name will have originally referred to just the island or possibly both the island and the manor of the same name based around it. Subsequently, the name Hackney was applied to the whole ancient parish of Hackney.

=== Iron Age to Anglo-Saxon period ===
In the Iron Age and probably until after the Roman period (as the Romans used tribal territories as administrative sub-divisions), the River Lea was considered to separate the territories of the Catuvellauni to the west of the river from the Trinovantes to the east.

The Romans built the Roman road, Ermine Street, which runs through the modern borough under the names Shoreditch High Street and Kingsland Road, among others.

In the Anglo-Saxon period, the River Lea separated the core territories of the East Saxons (on the east side) from the Middle Saxons (on the western, Hackney side) they often controlled. This continuity of this natural boundary from pre-Roman period may be a result of the differing Saxon groups taking control of pre-defined territories.

After both areas were brought under the control of Alfred the Great, the river became the boundary between the historic counties of Middlesex (Hackney) and Essex (modern Newham, Waltham Forest and Redbridge).

=== Later history ===
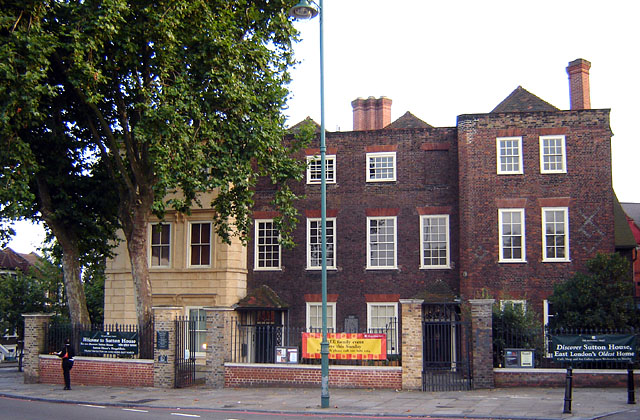
Sutton House was built in 1535.

In the Tudor period, the lands of religious orders were seized by the Crown and put up for sale. Thus Hackney became a retreat for the nobility around Hackney Central and Homerton. Henry VIII's Palace was by Lea Bridge roundabout, where BSix Sixth Form College stands today. Sutton House, on Homerton High Street, is the oldest surviving dwelling in Hackney, originally built in 1535 as Bryck Place for Sir Ralph Sadleir, a diplomat. The village of Hackney flourished from the Tudor to late Georgian periods as a rural retreat.

The first documented "hackney coach"—the forerunner of the more generic "hackney carriage"—operated in London in 1621. Current opinion is that the name "hackney", to refer to a London taxi, is derived from the village name. (Hackney, associated with high-stepping horses and horse-drawn carriages, is the root of the French word haquenée, a term used for a small breed of horse, and the Sardinian achetta horse.) Construction of the railway in the 1850s ended Hackney's rural reputation by connecting it to other parts of the city and stimulating development.

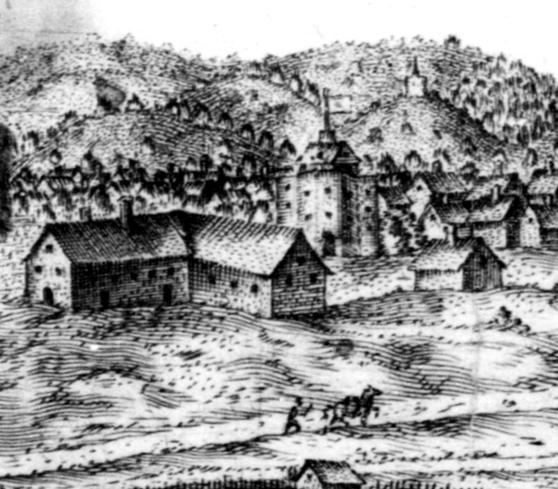
Curtain Theatre circa 1600 print. Note: some authorities believe this to be a depiction of the Theatre – the other Elizabethan theatre in Shoreditch.

London's first Tudor theatres were built at Shoreditch. The Gunpowder Plot was first exposed nearby in Hoxton.

In 1727 Daniel Defoe said of the villages of Hackney

All these, except the Wyck-house, are within a few years so encreas'd in buildings, and so fully inhabited, that there is no comparison to be made between their present and past state: Every separate hamlet is encreas'd, and some of them more than treble as big as formerly; Indeed as this whole town is included in the bills of mortality, tho' no where joining to London, it is in some respects to be call'd a part of it.

This town is so remarkable for the retreat of wealthy citizens, that there is at this time near a hundred coaches kept in it; tho' I will not join with a certain satyrical author, who said of Hackney, that there were more coaches than Christians in it.

The parish church of St John-at-Hackney was built in 1792, replacing the nearby former 16th-century parish church dedicated to St Augustine (pulled down in 1798).

Notable residents from the 17th, 18th and 19th centuries included Robert Aske, William Cecil, Samuel Courtauld, Samuel Hoare, Joseph Priestley and Thomas Sutton.

Many grand houses stood in Stoke Newington and Stamford Hill; the latter neighbourhood became a center of Hackney's many Orthodox Jewish residents from the 1930s. Alfred Hitchcock made many of his first films in Hoxton at the Gainsborough Studios in Poole Street.

The interwar era saw the building of social housing by the LCC and the borough council in the area including the Kingsmead Estate, Morningside Estate, Banister House and Nisbet House. The borough also includes housing projects developed by high-profile postwar architects including The Beckers (1958) by Sir Frederick Gibberd, Granard House (1959) by Colin St John Wilson and Pitcairn House (1962) by Eric Lyons. Following extensive post-war development and immigration since the late 20th century, population pressure has increased and the area's many Georgian and Victorian terraces are being gentrified, warehouses are being converted to housing, and new flats are being built.

In the 1980s and beyond, Hackney was described as the poorest borough in Britain - although it has been questioned whether this may have in fact been Glasgow, at the time. The council used the phrase 'Britain's Poorest Borough' in official materials. It was described in this way as late as 2001 and in Parliament in 2010. This picture has now changed: the 2019 Indices of Multiple Deprivation found that Hackney was the 22nd most deprived borough in England, down from 11th in 2015 and 2nd in 2010, whilst Hackney has also featured prominently in discussions of gentrification.

There are 58 parks and green spaces in Hackney, that cover an area of 282 hectares. As of 2008, seven Hackney parks had achieved Green Flag status. By 2025, that figure had increased to 33. Abney Park Cemetery, had been placed on Historic England’s at risk register since the inception of this list in 1998, but has since been restored and is no longer at risk. Hackney Marshes play host to the largest collection of football pitches in Europe. Part of it was used as a site for events of the 2012 Summer Olympics.

=== Listed buildings and conservation areas ===
There are hundreds of listed buildings in Hackney, including the Hackney Empire, Tudor Sutton House, and the Grade I medieval St Augustine's Tower, the borough's oldest building. The borough contains many conservation areas including Clapton Square and urban open-spaces including Clapton Common and Clissold Park. Conservation areas also protect large areas of Georgian and Victorian housing, and areas of industrial heritage.

=== Administrative history ===
The area of the modern borough broadly corresponds to the three ancient parishes of Hackney, Shoreditch and Stoke Newington, which had all historically been part of the Ossulstone hundred of the county of Middlesex. For some administrative functions, Ossulstone was divided into four divisions. Stoke Newington was part of the Finsbury division. Hackney and Shoreditch were both part of the Tower division, which was noteworthy in that the men of the area owed military service to the Tower of London.

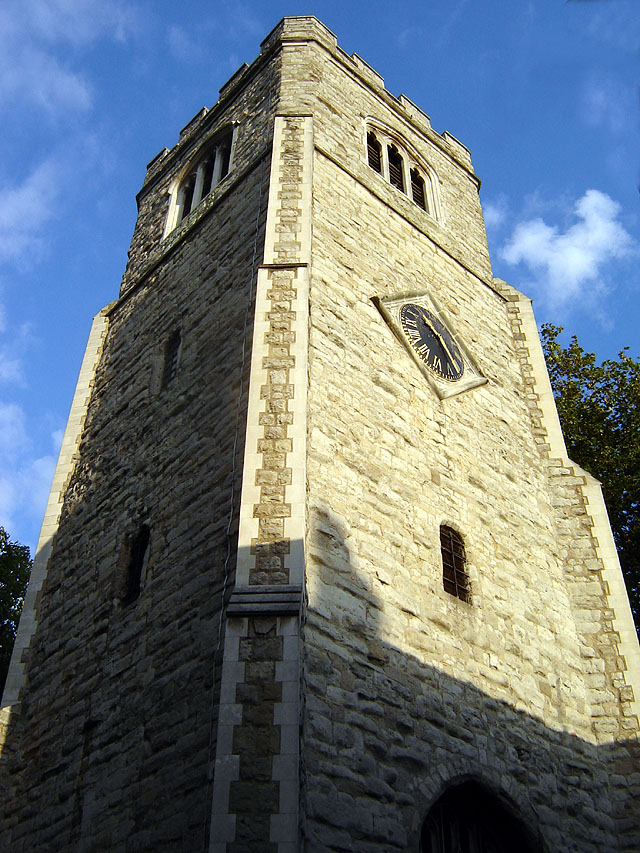
St Augustine's Tower, Hackney. A former property of the Knights of St John dating from the 13th century, St Augustine's Tower is Hackney's oldest building. The tower is all that remains of the medieval parish church, which was demolished in 1798.

The ancient parishes provided a framework for both civil (administrative) and ecclesiastical (church) functions, but during the 19th century there was a divergence into distinct civil and ecclesiastical parish systems. The ecclesiastical parishes were gradually sub-divided to better serve the needs of a growing population, while the civil parishes continued to be based on the same ancient parish areas.

From 1856 the area was governed by the Metropolitan Board of Works, which was established to provide services across the metropolis of London. In 1889 the Metropolitan Board of Works' area was made the County of London. From 1856 until 1900 the lower tier of local government within the metropolis comprised various parish vestries and district boards. Shoreditch was governed by its vestry, whilst Hackney and Stoke Newington were initially grouped into the Hackney District with a single board covering the two parishes. This proved unpopular, especially in more affluent Stoke Newington. After four unsuccessful attempts, the Hackney District was dissolved in 1894 under the Metropolis Management (Plumstead and Hackney) Act 1893, and its two parishes were then each governed separately by their own vestries.

In 1900 the lower tier was reorganised into metropolitan boroughs. In this area the three parishes each became a borough: Hackney, Shoreditch and Stoke Newington. There were some rationalisations to boundaries, notably that Shoreditch absorbed part of the tiny Liberty of Norton Folgate (with the rest going to neighbouring Stepney).

Stoke Newington was smaller than the desired size for the new boroughs, and there were proposals to re-merge Stoke Newington and Hackney, or to detach the northern part of Hackney and join it with Stoke Newington. These proposals were rejected due to the experience of "intolerable and interminable feuds" between the districts when they were previously "forced together". The First Lord of the Treasury, Arthur Balfour recognised that there was "great ill-feeling and mutual ill-will... between the inhabitants of the two districts". It was therefore decided to merge the South Hornsey exclaves of Hornsey, with a population about 20,000, with Stoke Newington. While this still created a borough of only about 50,000 inhabitants, and thus "the smallest borough in London, the anomaly would be a gradually diminishing one, because the population in this district was rapidly increasing. When dividing London up into boroughs they could not avoid creating some anomalies as to size."

The modern London Borough of Hackney was created in 1965 under the London Government Act 1963. It covered the combined area of the three metropolitan boroughs of Hackney, Shoreditch and Stoke Newington.

== Governance ==
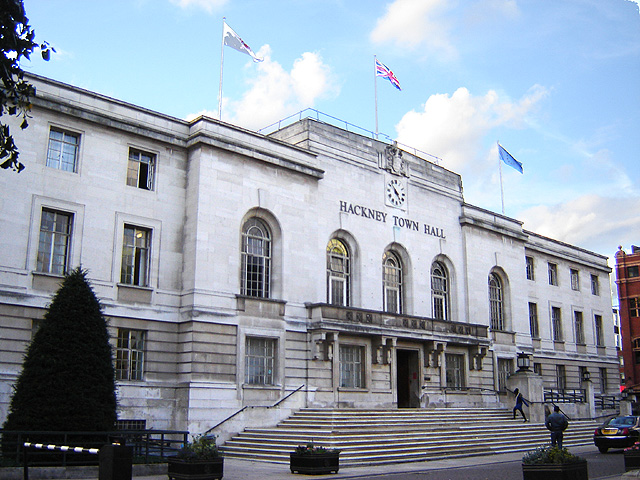
Hackney Town Hall was built in the 1930s for the former Metropolitan Borough of Hackney.

The local authority is Hackney Council, which meets at Hackney Town Hall and has its main offices in the adjoining Hackney Service Centre. Since 2002 the council has been led by the directly elected Mayor of Hackney. A speaker fulfils the civic and ceremonial duties previously undertaken by the (non-political) mayor prior to 2002.

=== Greater London representation ===
Since 2000, for elections to the London Assembly, the borough forms part of the North East constituency. The constituency returned Sem Moema AM as the directly elected Assembly Member in 2021.

=== UK Parliament ===
The borough comprises two parliamentary constituencies: Hackney North and Stoke Newington (represented by Diane Abbott MP) and Hackney South and Shoreditch (represented by Meg Hillier MP); both are Privy Counsellors and Labour Party Members of Parliament. Final recommendations for a change to the boundaries of these two constituencies were published by the Boundary Commission in July 2023.

== Geography ==
=== Sub-districts ===
The borough was formed by the merger of the metropolitan boroughs of Hackney, Shoreditch and Stoke Newington, with the boundaries of these very closely based on the Ancient Parishes of the same name; these areas have been consistently defined for many centuries. Historically, the River Lea formed the boundary between the predecessor counties of Middlesex and Essex.

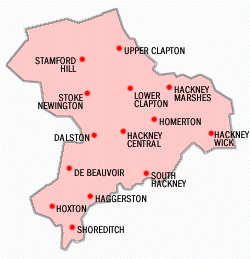
Localities in the London Borough of Hackney

Within these parish areas are a large number of sub-districts, some of which have sub-districts of their own. These sub-districts are generally based on former hamlets that expanded and merged as the area urbanised. These sub-districts have never been administrative units so have never had any formal boundaries, however a degree of informal definition has developed.

The sub-districts typically take Metropolitan Borough\Ancient Parish boundaries where available, and can also have informal customary boundaries such as road and railways. Despite this, many areas have only a weakly or partially understood extent and it is not unusual for perceptions of place to overlap or change over time.

The area of the former parish and borough of Stoke Newington includes the Woodberry Down area, while the former parish and borough of Shoreditch includes Hoxton and Haggerston.

The former parish and borough of Hackney is much larger and includes Hackney Central, Dalston, De Beauvoir Town, Shacklewell, Stamford Hill, Cambridge Heath, West Hackney, Upper and Lower Clapton, Hackney Wick and Homerton.

=== Topography and Landscape history ===
The London Borough of Hackney covers an area of 19.06 km^{2} (7.36 sq mi), rising westward from the Lea to reach 30 m (98 ft) above sea level at Clapton Common and Stamford Hill. The area around Victoria Park, in the south of the borough lies about 15 metres (49 feet) above sea level.

After the Norman Conquest the area became part of the Forest of Middlesex, which covered much of the county, but this gives rise to misunderstanding, as in this context "Forest" is a legal term referring to royal hunting rights and had a weak correlation with woodland cover, especially in the early post-Conquest Period.

By the time of the earliest reliable maps, in the 18th century, the area covered by the modern borough was an agricultural area characterised by enclosed farmland with small hamlets and very little woodland. There were a number of commons, most of which survived to become the basis of modern parks. Many of the major roads were present by this time, the road now known as the A10 was Roman, and others, like many in England, may be older.

With the obvious exception of the urbanisation of the area, the greatest changes have been to the waterways and wetlands of the area. The River Lea, the area's primary geographic feature, has lost its grazing marshes and seen the River Lee Navigation created in 1770. This is an artificial channel of the river, passing through Hackney Cut and across the Hackney Marshes to straighten a meander of the natural river. In Roman times and for a long time after, the River Lea was an estuary, tidal as far as Hackney Wick.

At Hackney Wick the Hackney Brook met the Lea; the confluence was very wide when flooded. Hackney Brook was fully culverted in 1860 by the Metropolitan Board of Works.

The New River was opened in 1613, diverting water from the Lea catchment to create a source of drinking water for London. The New River still passes through the borough, close to Finsbury Park and flows towards Islington. Another man-made feature, the Regents Canal also crosses the borough to the south of De Beauvoir Town in the west, joining the Hertford Union Canal below Victoria Park.

=== Housing and industry ===
Much of Hackney retains an inner-city character, but in such places as Dalston large housing estates have been joined by newly developed gated communities. In South Hackney, near Victoria Park, terraced Georgian, Victorian and Edwardian housing still survives.

Light industries in the area around the River Lea employ over 3,000 people.

=== Geology ===
The Lea and Hackney Marshes are underlain by alluvium soils; and the higher ground between Homerton and Stamford Hill is formed on a widening bed of London Clay. Brickearth deposits are within tongues of clay extending beneath Clapton Common, Stamford Hill and Stoke Newington High Street. The centre and south-western districts lie on river terrace deposits of Taplow Gravel. Victoria Park and Well Street Common lie on flood plain gravel.

=== Climate ===
This data was taken between 1971 and 2000 at the nearest national weather station in Greenwich; around 7 miles (11.3 km) south of Hackney Town Hall:

Climate data for Greenwich Park, elevation: 47 m (154 ft), 1991–2020 normals, extremes 1948–2004
Month	Jan	Feb	Mar	Apr	May	Jun	Jul	Aug	Sep	Oct	Nov	Dec	Year
Record high °C (°F)	16.8 (62.2)	19.7 (67.5)	23.3 (73.9)	25.3 (77.5)	29.0 (84.2)	34.5 (94.1)	35.3 (95.5)	37.5 (99.5)	30.2 (86.4)	26.1 (79.0)	18.9 (66.0)	16.4 (61.5)	37.5 (99.5)
Mean daily maximum °C (°F)	8.5 (47.3)	9.2 (48.6)	12.1 (53.8)	15.4 (59.7)	18.6 (65.5)	21.4 (70.5)	23.8 (74.8)	23.3 (73.9)	20.3 (68.5)	15.8 (60.4)	11.6 (52.9)	8.9 (48.0)	15.8 (60.4)
Daily mean °C (°F)	5.9 (42.6)	6.2 (43.2)	8.4 (47.1)	10.7 (51.3)	13.8 (56.8)	16.7 (62.1)	18.8 (65.8)	18.7 (65.7)	15.9 (60.6)	12.4 (54.3)	8.8 (47.8)	6.3 (43.3)	11.9 (53.4)
Mean daily minimum °C (°F)	3.4 (38.1)	3.2 (37.8)	4.7 (40.5)	6.0 (42.8)	9.1 (48.4)	12.0 (53.6)	13.9 (57.0)	14.1 (57.4)	11.6 (52.9)	9.0 (48.2)	6.1 (43.0)	3.8 (38.8)	8.1 (46.6)
Record low °C (°F)	−12.7 (9.1)	−9.4 (15.1)	−6.7 (19.9)	−4.8 (23.4)	−1.0 (30.2)	1.1 (34.0)	5.0 (41.0)	5.3 (41.5)	1.1 (34.0)	−2.1 (28.2)	−8.0 (17.6)	−10.5 (13.1)	−12.7 (9.1)
Average precipitation mm (inches)	43.9 (1.73)	39.9 (1.57)	36.5 (1.44)	38.6 (1.52)	44.0 (1.73)	49.3 (1.94)	36.3 (1.43)	53.0 (2.09)	52.4 (2.06)	58.3 (2.30)	59.9 (2.36)	50.7 (2.00)	562.9 (22.16)
Average precipitation days (≥ 1.0 mm)	10.5	9.2	7.9	8.1	7.9	7.8	7.1	8.2	7.9	10.3	10.6	10.2	105.6
Mean monthly sunshine hours	44.4	66.1	109.7	152.9	198.7	198.6	209.2	198.0	140.6	99.7	58.5	50.1	1,526.4
Source 1: Met Office
Source 2: Starlings Roost Weather

== Demography ==
Population pyramid of the Borough of Hackney in 2021

Population
Year	Pop.	±%
1801	14,609	—
1811	19,523	+33.6%
1821	25,342	+29.8%
1831	35,482	+40.0%
1841	68,246	+92.3%
1851	94,961	+39.1%
1861	172,385	+81.5%
1871	249,810	+44.9%
1881	327,234	+31.0%
1891	369,209	+12.8%
1901	374,132	+1.3%
1911	379,120	+1.3%
1921	368,469	−2.8%
1931	358,117	−2.8%
1941	305,501	−14.7%
1951	260,626	−14.7%
1961	240,521	−7.7%
1971	221,975	−7.7%
1981	179,536	−19.1%
1991	187,792	+4.6%
2001	202,819	+8.0%
2011	246,270	+21.4%
2021	259,147	+5.2%
2024 estimate	266,758	+2.9%
Source: A Vision of Britain through time 2024 estimate

In 1801, the civil parishes that form the modern borough had a total population of 14,609. This rose steadily throughout the 19th century, as the district became built up; reaching 95,000 in the middle of that century. When the railways arrived the rate of population growth increased — reaching nearly 374,000 by the turn of the century. This increase in population peaked before World War I, falling slowly in the aftermath until World War II began an exodus from London towards the new towns under the Abercrombie Plan for London (1944). The population is now rising again, and the 2001 census gives Hackney a population of 202,824.

The population is ethnically diverse. Of the resident population, 89,490 (44%) people describe themselves as White British. 24,861 (12%) are in other White ethnic groups, 50,009 (24%) are Black or Black British, 19,791 (9%) are Asian or Asian British, 8,501 (4%) describe themselves as 'Mixed', and 6,432 (3%) as Chinese or Other.

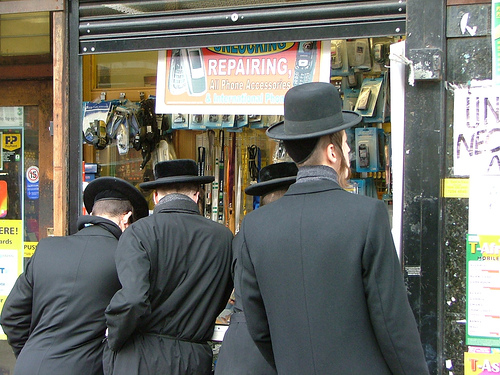
Stamford Hill, along with neighbouring West Hackney, Clapton and Stoke Newington, has a large Hasidic Jewish population.

There is also a large Turkish and Kurdish population resident in Hackney. Turkish and Kurdish communities are located in all parts of the borough, though there is a greater concentration in north and central Hackney.

132,931 (66%) of the resident population were British born. A further 10,095 (5%) were born in other parts of Europe, and the remaining 59,798 (29%) born elsewhere in the world.

2018 estimates are that Christianity is the biggest religion in Hackney, with 31% of residents identifying Christian; 13% identified as Muslim, 10% Jewish, and 7% belonged to other religions. A further 38% either have no religion, or did not submit a response. In numerical terms, Hackney has the second largest Jewish population of any local authority in the United Kingdom, after the London Borough of Barnet (and in percentage terms, third after Barnet and the Hertsmere borough of Hertfordshire).

32% of households are owner–occupied.

The largest rise of ethnic groups between 2001 and 2011 was "Other", which increased by 222%. This was followed by "Mixed", which rose by 84%.

According to the GLA Population Estimate for 2018, 36.4% of the borough's population are White British, 18.1% are "Other White", 10.3% are of Black African heritage, and 6.4% are of Black Caribbean heritage. Hackney is also home to several smaller Asian communities.

=== Ethnicity ===
Ethnic Group	Year													
Ethnic Group	1966 estimations		1971 estimations		1981 estimations		1991 census		2001 census		2011 census		2021 census	
Ethnic Group	Number	%	Number	%	Number	%	Number	%	Number	%	Number	%	Number	%
White: Total	–	92.9%	–	85.1%	131,797	73.2%	124,090	66%	120,468	59.4%	134,617	54.7%	137,709	53.1%
White: British	–	–	–	–	–	–	–	–	89,490	44.1%	89,030	36.2%	87,927	33.9%
White: Irish	–	–	–	–	–	–	–	–	6,117	3.0%	5,216	2.1%	5,582	2.2%
White: Gypsy or Irish Traveller	–	–	–	–	–	–	–	–	–	–	474	0.2%	248	0.1%
White: Roma	–	–	–	–	–	–	–	–	–	–	–	–	865	0.3%
White: Other	–	–	–	–	–	–	–	–	24,861	12.3%	39,897	16.2%	43,087	16.6%
Black or Black British: Total	–	–	–	–	33,171	18.4%	41,903	22.3%	50,009	24.7%	56,858	23.1%	54,645	21.1%
Black or Black British: African	–	–	–	–	7,701	4.3%	12,886	6.9%	24,290	12.0%	27,976	11.4%	29,478	11.4%
Black or Black British: Caribbean	–	–	–	–	19,330	10.7%	21,321	11.3%	20,879	10.3%	19,168	7.8%	17,903	6.9%
Black or Black British: Other Black	–	–	–	–	6,140		7,696		4,840	2.4%	9,714	3.9%	7,264	2.8%
Asian or Asian British: Total	–	–	–	–	11,411	6.3%	16,550	8.8%	19,791	9.8%	25,867	10.5%	26,885	10.3%
Asian or Asian British: Indian	–	–	–	–	5,405		6,629		7,624	3.8%	7,599	3.1%	8,832	3.4%
Asian or Asian British: Pakistani	–	–	–	–	1,489		1,845		2,165	1.1%	1,905	0.8%	2,461	0.9%
Asian or Asian British: Bangladeshi	–	–	–	–	1,824		3,446		5,970	2.9%	6,180	2.5%	6,554	2.5%
Asian or Asian British: Chinese	–	–	–	–	1,308		2,016		2,377	1.2%	3,436	1.4%	3,459	1.3%
Asian or Asian British: Other Asian	–	–	–	–	1,385		2,614		1,655	0.8%	6,747	2.7%	5,579	2.2%
Mixed or British Mixed: Total	–	–	–	–	–	–	–	–	8,501	4.2%	15,869	6.4%	17,487	6.7%
Mixed: White and Black Caribbean	–	–	–	–	–	–	–	–	3,075	1.5%	4,989	2.0%	4,749	1.8%
Mixed: White and Black African	–	–	–	–	–	–	–	–	1,599	0.8%	2,866	1.2%	2,735	1.1%
Mixed: White and Asian	–	–	–	–	–	–	–	–	1,576	0.8%	3,020	1.2%	3,691	1.4%
Mixed: Other Mixed	–	–	–	–	–	–	–	–	2,251	1.1%	4,994	2.0%	6,312	2.4%
Other: Total	–	–	–	–	3,764		5,357		4,055	2.0%	13,059	5.3%	22,421	8.6%
Other: Arab	–	–	–	–	–	–	–	–	–	–	1,721	0.7%	2,342	0.9%
Other: Any other ethnic group	–	–	–	–	–	–	–	–	4,055	2.0%	11,338	4.6%	20,079	7.7%
Ethnic minority: Total	–	7.1%	–	14.9%	48,348	26.8%	63,810	33%	82,356	40.7%	111,653	45.3%	121,438	46.9%
Total	–	100%	–	100%	180,145	100%	187,900	100%	202,824	100%	246,270	100%	259,147	100%

=== Religion ===
The following shows the religious identity of residents residing in Hackney according to the census results.

Religion	1971 estimates		1995 estimates		2001 census		2011 census		2021 census	
Religion	Number	%	Number	%	Number	%	Number	%	Number	%
Holds religious beliefs	–	–	–	–	139,902	69.0	153,170	62.2	142,592	55.0
Christian	–	–	–	–	94,431	46.6	95,131	38.6	79,499	30.7
Muslim	–	–	–	–	27,908	13.8	34,727	14.1	34,578	13.3
Sikh	–	–	–	–	1,725	0.9	1,872	0.8	1,867	0.7
Hindu	–	–	–	–	1,637	0.8	1,577	0.6	1,998	0.8
Buddhist	–	–	–	–	2,321	1.1	3,075	1.2	2,343	0.9
Jewish	30,000	14%	17,900	9.9%	10,732	5.3	15,477	6.3	17,426	6.7
Other religion	–	–	–	–	1,148	0.6	1,311	0.5	4,879	1.9
No religion	–	–	–	–	38,607	19.0	69,454	28.2	94,113	36.3
Religion not stated	–	–	–	–	24,315	12.0	23,646	9.6	22,442	8.7
Total population	–	100%	–	100%	202,824	100%	246,270	100%	259,147	100%

In 2021 the Interlink Foundation estimated the borough's Haredi Jewish population to be between 27,405 and 29,460. This would be between 11.7 and 12.5% of residents.

=== Other statistics ===
In a 2007 report, every ward of Hackney was among the 10% most deprived in the country, with 47% of children living in low-income households.

Hackney had a reputation as one of the most crime-ridden London boroughs, and some of its streets were even referred to as "Murder Mile", but cooperation between local police and council resulted in the borough experiencing a bigger drop in crime than in any other London borough in the four-year period up to 2007 (28% reduction).

In the 2011 census, Hackney had the highest rate of commuters travelling by bicycle in London.

=== Immigration ===
This list includes top-15 sources of immigration to Borough of Hackney for 2021 census:

#	Country	Number
1	Turkiye	8,674
2	Nigeria	5,239
3	Italy	4,378
4	France	3,926
5	United States	3,735
6	Poland	3,529
7	Ireland	3,311
8	Jamaica	3,250
9	Australia	3,188
10	India	3,126
11	Ghana	3,088
12	Spain	2,876
13	Bangladesh	2,511
14	Israel	2,386
15	Germany	2,230

== Education ==
In 2002, the borough entered into a 10-year contract with the Learning Trust, an independent collaborative body that organises education for Hackney's 27,000 pupils in over 70 schools, nurseries and play centres. The trust was set up in response to an OFSTED report that identified failings in the then existing system. Two of London's most successful City Academies are in Hackney with another two in development and plans to rebuild or renovate every other Hackney school by 2016. LBH regained responsibility for education in 2012, absorbing the Learning Trust under the new name "Hackney Learning Trust".

=== Public libraries ===
The London Borough of Hackney has eight public libraries:

- Clapton Library
- Dalston CLR James Library
- Hackney Central Library
- Homerton Library
- Shoreditch Library
- Stamford Hill Library
- Stoke Newington Library
- Woodberry Down Library

== Transport ==
Three London Overground lines serve Hackney: the North London Line crosses from west to east while the East London Line runs from Highbury & Islington and passes through Dalston Junction and on south through Haggerston, Hoxton, Shoreditch towards destinations south of the River Thames, including Clapham Junction, Crystal Palace, Croydon, and New Cross. Local services on the Lea Valley Lines passed into London Overground on 31 May 2015. Trains originate at London Liverpool Street and head towards either Enfield Town (via Bush Hill Park), Cheshunt (via Turkey Street) or Chingford (via Clapton).

It is proposed that Crossrail 2 will provide Hackney a new station at Dalston with the potential of the future 'eastern branch' with stops at Hackney Central and Hackney Wick.

=== London Overground ===
North London Line Travelling west to east — Dalston Kingsland, Hackney Central, Homerton and Hackney Wick

East London Line Travelling north to south — Dalston Junction, Haggerston, Hoxton and Shoreditch High Street

Lea Valley Lines Travelling south to north – London Fields, Hackney Downs, Rectory Road, Stoke Newington and Stamford Hill.

=== Travel to work ===
In March 2011, the main forms of transport that residents used to travel to work were: bus, minibus or coach, 16.9% of all residents aged 16–74; underground, metro, light rail, tram, 9.2%; bicycle, 9.2%; on foot, 7.5%; driving a car or van, 7.1%; train, 4.6%; work mainly at or from home, 3.5%. 65% of households in Hackney were car free.

== Media ==
The Hackney Gazette and Hackney Citizen provide local news.

== Attractions and institutions ==
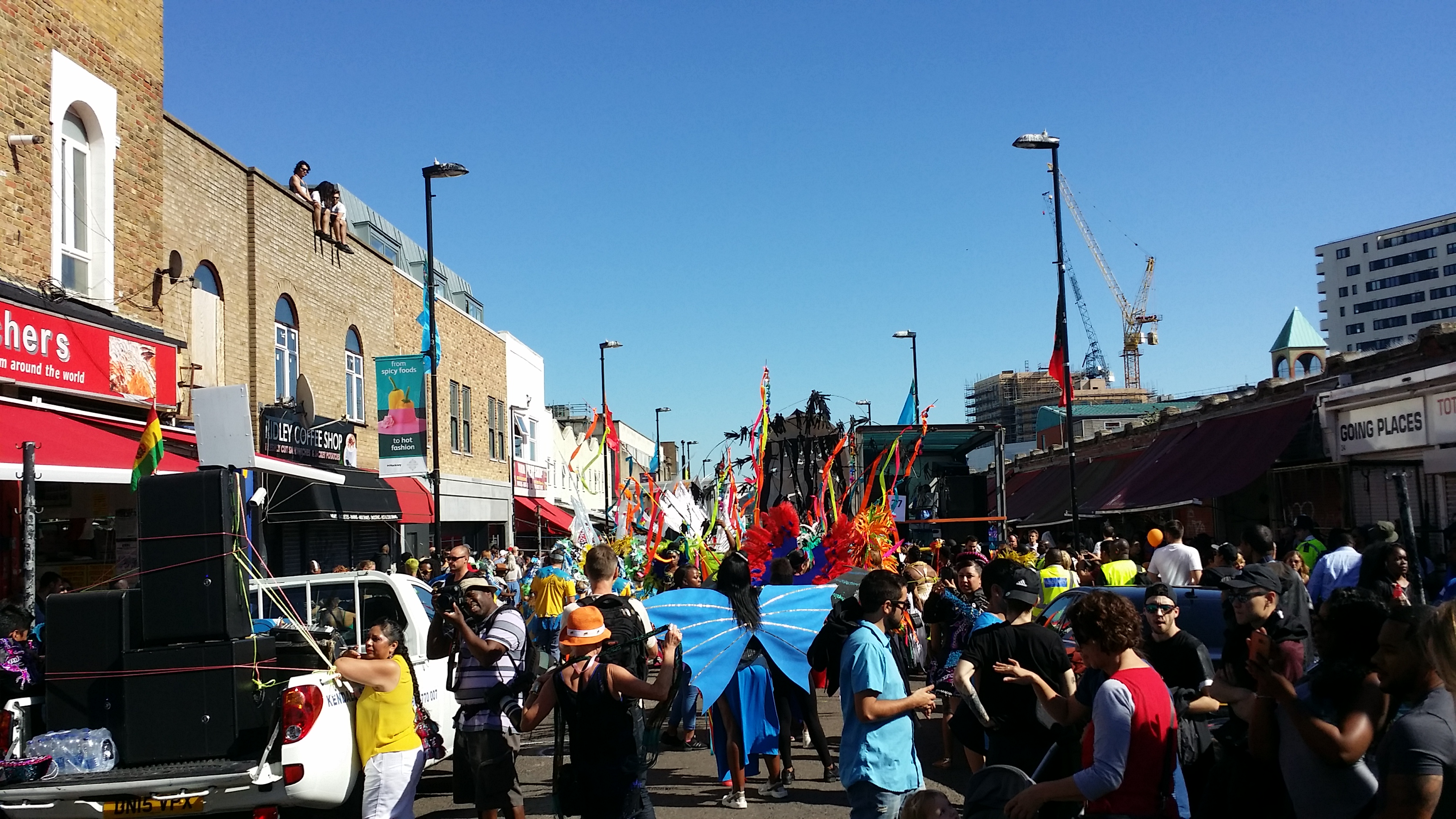
Hackney One Carnival on Ridley road (2016)

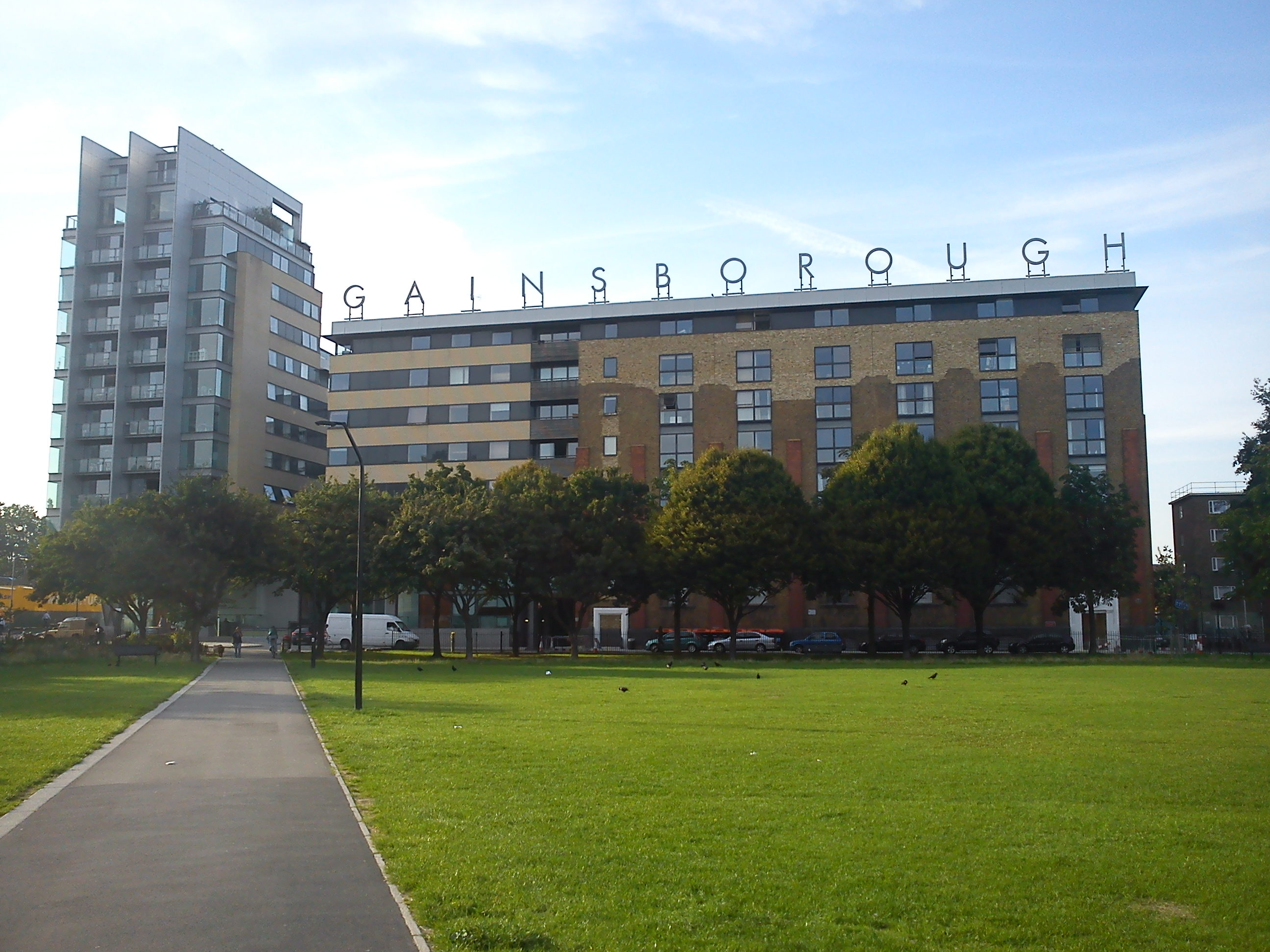
Flats built in the site of Gainsborough Studios in Hoxton

- Abney Park Cemetery – overgrown Victorian cemetery and Nature Reserve
- Arcola Theatre – studio theatre
- Broadway Market – popular outdoor market
- Cafe Oto – music club and daytime café
- Castle Climbing Centre
- Hackney Carnival – carnival street parade
- Hackney City Farm
- Hackney Empire – theatre
- Hackney Wick Stadium (closed 1997)
- Happy Man Tree - England's Tree of the Year 2020
- Hoxton Hall – community centre and performance space
- Museum of the Home – decorative arts museum
- National Centre of Circus Arts – circus school
- Newington Green Unitarian Church – London's oldest nonconformist place of worship
- Rio Cinema – Grade II listed independent Art Deco cinema
- Shoreditch Town Hall
- St John's Hoxton – Anglican church (where "Amazing Grace" was written)
- St Leonard's Hospital, Hackney - Local Hospital
- Sutton House – heritage house and museum
- The Dolphin - Grade II listed public house and venue
- The Towers of Hackney
- Victoria Miro Gallery – contemporary art gallery
- Vortex Jazz Club – live jazz venue
- Woodberry Wetlands – nature reserve

== Coat of arms ==
Coat of Arms of the London Borough of Hackney

The borough's coat of arms includes elements representing its three predecessor boroughs:

- The shield is surmounted by a representation of Hackney's St. Augustine's Tower.
- An eight-pointed Maltese Cross, for Hackney, which derives from the symbols of the Orders of the Knights Templar and Knights of St. John, both of whom held the Manor of Hackney.
- Bells representing Shoreditch, these are the bells in the nursery rhyme Oranges and Lemons.
- Oaks for Stoke Newington, representing its origins in the Forest of Middlesex.

== Twin towns – sister cities ==
Hackney's twin towns and sister cities include:

=== Active ===
- Suresnes, Île-de-France, France
- St George’s, Grenada

=== Inactive ===
- Bridgetown, Barbados
- Göttingen, Lower Saxony, Germany
- Haifa, Israel

== Freedom of the Borough ==
The following people, military units, and organisations and groups have received the Freedom of the Borough of Hackney.

=== Individuals ===
- John Hillman: 1928
- Theodore Chapman: 1931
- Henry Charles Rawll 1931
- Sir William Ray Knight: 1931
- Captain Sir Oscar Warburg: 1931
- Walter Ernest Loweth: 1934
- Henry Edwin Goodrich: 1941
- Giles Charles Burton: 1947
- Herbert William Butler: 1947
- Florence Helena Du Vergier: 1947
- Walter Thomas Wayman: 1947
- Albert Cullington: 1955
- The Honourable Arthur George Child-Villiers: 1955
- Monsieur Marcel Legras, Mayor of Suresnes Seine: 1958
- William Nichols: 1960
- Clarissa Gooch: 1960
- Mary Omerod: 1964
- Charles Richard Halerow: 1964
- George Ernest Silver: 1964
- George Leonard Alfred Downing: 1965
- Ernest Henderson: 1965
- Sir Louis Sherman: 1978
- Lady Sherman: 1978
- Gladys M. Shanagher: 1978
- Lilian Karpin: 1978
- Arthur Super: 1978
- Alfred Alexander: 1978
- Max Marcus Feldman: 1986
- John Kotz: 1986
- Robert William Masters: 1986
- Edward George Henry Millen: 1986
- Martin Ottolangui: 1986
- Robert Edward Owen: 1986
- Matilda Anne Owen: 1990
- Dr. Alexander Engelhardt, Chief Executive of Goettingen District Council: 1995
- Joe Lobenstein: 1997
- Gerry Ross: 1997
- Gordon Bell: 19 April 2001
- Saleem Siddiqui: 30 October 2013
- Lt Col Roderick Morriss: 25 February 2015

=== Military units ===
- 3 Military Intelligence Battalion (Volunteers) Intelligence Corps: 2008

=== Organisations and groups ===
- Volunteer Centre Hackney: 21 July 2021
- Medics at the Homerton University Hospital: 28 July 2021
