= Metropolitan Borough of Stoke Newington =

Former London borough, United Kingdom

Coordinates: 51.562°N 0.082°W

Stoke Newington
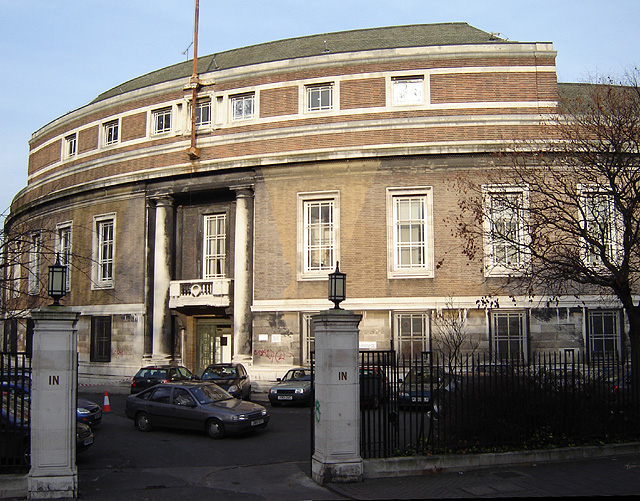
- Stoke Newington Town Hall

- Stoke Newington within the County of London
- History
  - Origin: Stoke Newington parish
  - Created: 1900
  - Abolished: 1965
  - Succeeded by: London Borough of Hackney
- Status: Metropolitan borough
- Government: Stoke Newington Borough Council
  - HQ: Stoke Newington Church Street
  - Motto: Respice Prospice {Look to the past and the future}
- Coat of arms of the borough council
- Map of borough boundary

The Metropolitan Borough of Stoke Newington was a metropolitan borough in the County of London between 1900 and 1965 when it became part of the London Borough of Hackney.

== Formation and boundaries ==
=== Predecessor authorities ===
The borough was the successor to two local authorities: the vestry of Stoke Newington parish in the County of London and the South Hornsey Urban District Council in Middlesex.

Under the Metropolis Management Act 1855 Stoke Newington had been grouped with the neighbouring parish of Hackney under the administration of the Hackney District Board of Works. The union with Hackney was very unpopular with the inhabitants of Stoke Newington, and following unsuccessful attempts to end it in 1864, 1880 and 1890, the parish regained independence in 1894. Stoke Newington Vestry consisted of 60 vestrymen, elected from five wards.

South Hornsey formed the southern part of the parish of Hornsey, consisting of the Brownswood Park area south of Finsbury Park, 29 acres (0.1 km^{2}) of Clissold Park and two detached areas entirely surrounded by the parish of Stoke Newington. The exclaves of South Hornsey effectively cut off the south-eastern section of Stoke Newington from the rest of the parish. A local board was formed to govern the area in 1867, becoming an urban district under the Local Government Act 1894.

=== Formation ===
The London Government Act 1899 provided that the County of London should be divided into metropolitan boroughs. The new authorities were to based on existing parishes with simplified boundaries. It was intended that each borough would have a population of between 100,000 and 400,000 inhabitants. Where an area fell below the threshold of 100,000 inhabitants, it might still be constituted a borough if it had a rateable value exceeding 500,000 pounds.

Stoke Newington presented a problem, as its population fell well below the prescribed limits. It was recognised that there were three possibilities: to recombine the parishes of Hackney and Stoke Newington into a single borough; to divide the existing parish of Hackney and combine the wealthier northern section with Stoke Newington to form a municipality with the boundaries of the Hackney North parliamentary constituency; or to add neighbouring areas of Middlesex to increase the population.

The first two options were rejected due to the experience of "intolerable and interminable feuds" between the districts when they were previously "forced together", and because the First Lord of the Treasury, Arthur Balfour recognised that there was "great ill-feeling and mutual ill-will... between the inhabitants of the two districts"; it was therefore decided to merge the bulk of South Hornsey, with a population about 20,000, with Stoke Newington. While this still created a borough of only about 50,000 inhabitants, and thus "the smallest borough in London, the anomaly would be a gradually diminishing one, because the population in this district was rapidly increasing. When dividing London up into boroughs they could not avoid creating some anomalies as to size."

=== Boundaries ===
Under the 1899 legislation, boundary commissioners were appointed to set the boundaries of the new boroughs. The existing parish boundaries frequently divided houses or related to field boundaries that had disappeared with the urbanisation of the area. The commissioners realigned the boundary lines so that for the most part they ran down the centre of roads, railways or watercourses.

To the north, the borough had a boundary with Middlesex, marked by the course of the New River and the Seven Sisters Road. Stoke Newington's boundaries with the two neighbouring metropolitan boroughs within the County of London were as follows:

- Islington to the west and south: the centres of Blackstock Road, Mountgrove Roads, Green Lanes, (diverting to take in Petherton Road and Leconfield Road) Matthias Road and Boleyn Road.
- Hackney to the east and north east: the centre of the ancient Ermine Street, known here as Kingsland High Street, Stoke Newington Road and Stoke Newington High Street, then following the North London Railway from Stoke Newington railway station to Bethune Road. (The area to the east of the main road, including Stoke Newington Common, never formed part of Stoke Newington administratively, lying within the parish of Hackney).

== Coat of arms ==
Unofficial arms used 1900 – 1934

The long association with the dean and chapter of St Paul's Cathedral is represented by the red background and crossed swords. The cross is from the arms of William Patten, first lord of the manor and rebuilder of the church of St Mary, in 1550. The trees represent the ancient forest, and the green lion, that of John Dudley. The griffin refers to Daniel Defoe, and the banner, the arms of Sir Thomas Abney.

The Latin motto translates as Look to the past and the future, the arms were granted on 12 June 1934.

When merged to found the London Borough of Hackney in 1965, oaks from these arms were put in the new coat of arms of the London Borough of Hackney.

The coat of arms of 1934 replaced an unofficial device adopted by the council on incorporation in 1900. At the top of the shield was a representation of the parish church. The lower part of the shield featured the arms of the cities of London and Westminster on the left, and the attributed arms of the Kingdom of Essex representing Middlesex on the right. These armorial devices were chosen to represent the union of Stoke Newington in the County of London and South Hornsey in Middlesex. The crest was formed by a tree, recalling Stoke Newington's origin as a village in the Middlesex Forest.

== Population and area ==
Constituent parishes 1801-1900
Statistics compiled by the London County Council, in 1901 show the population growth in London, over the preceding century. The figures compiled by the council for 1891 do not agree with those that appear in the census reports, however which gave a population of 47,988 for the area.

Year	1801	1811	1821	1831	1841	1851	1861	1871	1881	1891
Population	1,984	2,758	3,360	4,192	5,522	6,134	11,297	17,452	37,561	47,828

Metropolitan Borough 1900-1961
The area of the parish of Stoke Newington was 639 acres (2.6 km^{2}) in 1891. Following the addition of most of South Hornsey and the boundary adjustments with Hackney and Islington, the area of the borough in 1901 was 863 acres (3.5 km^{2}). The populations recorded in National Censuses were:

Year	1901	1911	1921	1931	1941	1951	1961
Population	51,247	50,659	52,172	51,208		49,136	52,301

== Politics ==
A map showing the wards of Stoke Newington Metropolitan Borough as they appeared in 1916.

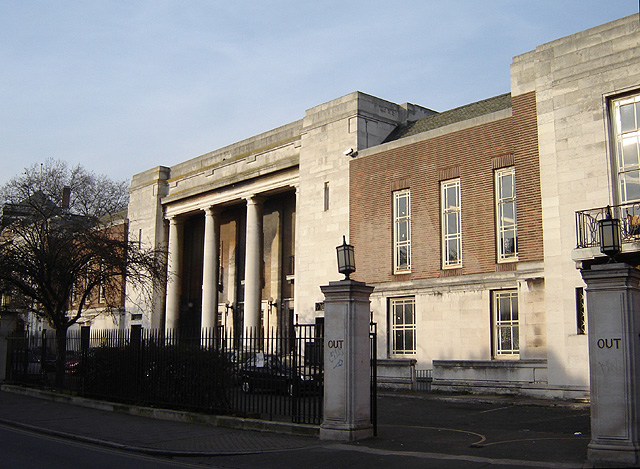
Stoke Newington Town Hall. An austere building (perhaps reflecting local nonconformist traditions) compared with those of nearby boroughs like Shoreditch. (January 2006)

=== Incorporated vestry ===
In 1891 as its population had increased the parish of St Mary Stoke Newington was divided into five wards (electing vestrymen): Lordship (15), Church (15), Manor (12), Clissold (9) and Palatine (9).

=== Borough council ===
The borough council consisted of 30 councillors and 5 aldermen. In 1900 the boundary commissioners divided the borough into six wards for the election of councillors:

Ward	No. of councillors	Area	Population 1901	Population 1931
Church	6	88 acres (0.4 km^{2})	11,248	9,993
Clissold	3	79 acres (0.3 km^{2})	6,170	6,651
Lordship	6	278 acres (1.1 km^{2})	5,774	6,023
Manor	3	146 acres (0.6 km^{2})	5,321	5,146
Palatine	3	40 acres (0.2 km^{2})	5,766	5,338
South Hornsey	9	232 acres (0.9 km^{2})	16,968	18,057

The first council elected consisted entirely of "Non-Party" candidates, although The Times noted that they were "Conservative in character". The entire council continued to be described as Independent or Non-Party until the 1934 election when the Labour Party gained 13 seats to the Independents' 17. Labour gained control of the council in 1945, taking all of the seats on the council. The Conservative Party first ran in the 1949 election, winning control from Labour by 23 seats to 7.

The wards of the borough were redrawn in 1953, with the area divided into ten wards, each electing three councillors. This reflected the change in settlement in the area, in particular the construction of new estates of council flats, including the London County Council's large Woodberry Down development which housed about a seventh of the borough's population. The names of the wards, a number of which were named after famous residents of Stoke Newington, were as follows:

- Brownswood
- Church
- Clissold
- Defoe
- Lordship
- Manor
- Milton
- Palatine
- Wilberforce
- Woodberry

Labour regained power at the 1953 election with 24 seats to 6 Conservatives. They held control at subsequent elections, taking all the seats in 1959. The final election of the council on 10 May 1962 saw four Liberal Party councillors elected to form an opposition group to the 26 Labour members.

=== Parliamentary constituency ===
Until 1918 the area formed part of the constituency of Hackney North. In 1918 a new constituency of Stoke Newington identical with the metropolitan borough was created. Due to loss of population, the two constituencies were merged in 1950 as Hackney North and Stoke Newington.

== See also ==
- London Government Act 1899
- Metropolis Management Act 1855
