= Metropolitan Borough of Shoreditch =

Borough of London, England

Coordinates: 51.525°N 0.077°W

Shoreditch
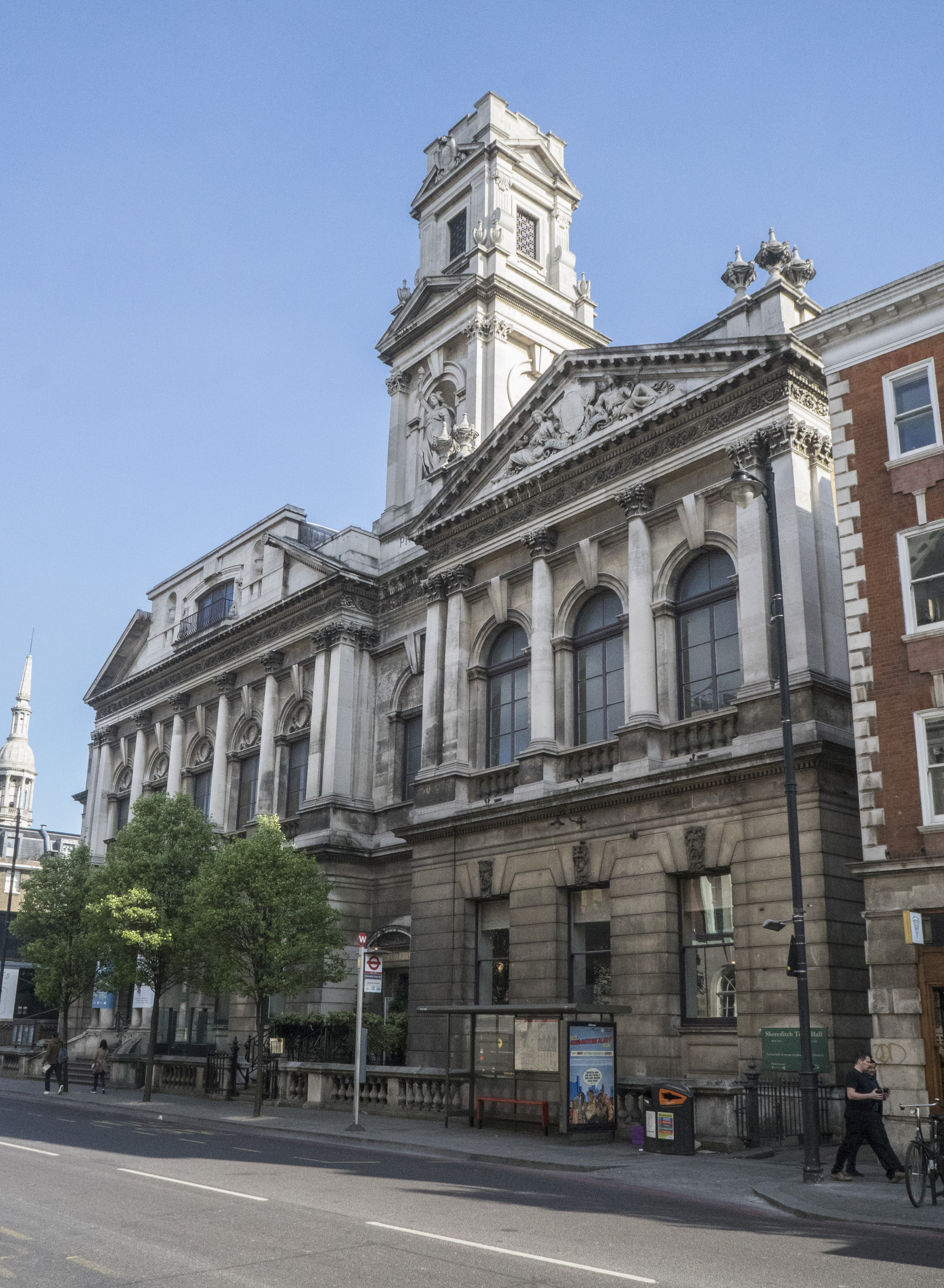
- Shoreditch Town Hall

- Shoreditch shown within the County of London
- Area
  - 1911/1931: 658 acres (2.66 km^{2})
  - 1961: 659 acres (2.67 km^{2})
- Population
  - 1911: 111,390
  - 1931: 97,042
  - 1961: 40,455
- Density
  - 1911: 169/acre
  - 1931: 147/acre
  - 1961: 61/acre
- History
  - Origin: Shoreditch and Norton Folgate
  - Created: 1899
  - Abolished: 1965
  - Succeeded by: London Borough of Hackney
- Status: Metropolitan borough
- Government: Shoreditch Borough Council
  - HQ: Old Street
  - Motto: More Light, More Power
- Coat of Arms adopted by the Borough Council
- Map of borough boundary

The Metropolitan Borough of Shoreditch was a metropolitan borough of the County of London between 1899 and 1965, when it was merged with the Metropolitan Borough of Stoke Newington and the Metropolitan Borough of Hackney to form the London Borough of Hackney.

The borough was made up of three main districts, Shoreditch, Hoxton and Haggerston, and covered some of the traditional East End of London. An individual coat of arms was never granted to the metropolitan borough council; they adopted the arms of the second lord of the manor of Shoreditch, John de Northampton.

== Boundaries ==
The borough comprised the area of the ancient parish of Shoreditch (St Leonard's) plus part of the ancient liberty of Norton Folgate to the south The parish vestry had taken on local administration from the 17th century onwards.

== Civic buildings ==
The civic buildings of the borough included the Town Hall (originally the Vestry Hall) in Old Street with the Magistrates Court (derelict in 2007), the Coroner's Court in Boundary St and other civic offices nearby.

== Motto ==
The borough motto commemorates the provision of electric power to the borough from the Vestry of St Leonard Shoreditch Electric Light Station later known as the Shoreditch Borough Refuse Destructor and Generating Station on Coronet Street. The building on Coronet Street is embellished with the motto E PULVERE LUX ET VIS (Out of the dust, light and power). It was built in 1896 and burned rubbish, to provide steam for the electricity generator. The waste heat was used to heat the public baths next door (and now demolished). The building is now home to the National Centre for Circus Arts.

== Population and area ==
The metropolitan borough was conterminous with the Vestry authority, when it was formed in 1900. Statistics compiled by the London County Council, in 1901 show the population growth in London, over the preceding century.

The area of the borough in 1901 was 658 acres (2.7 km^{2}). The populations recorded in National Censuses were:

Shoreditch Vestry 1801-1899

Year	1801	1811	1821	1831	1841	1851	1861	1871	1881	1891
Population	34,766	43,930	52,966	68,564	83,432	109,257	129,364	127,164	126,591	124,009

Metropolitan Borough 1900-1961

Year	1901	1911	1921	1931	1941	1951	1961
Population	118,668	111,390	104,248	104,248		44,871	40,455

By comparison, after amalgamation with Hackney and Stoke Newington, to form the modern London Borough of Hackney, the combined area became 19.06 km² - approximately 4,710 acres (19.1 km^{2}); in 2005, this had a population of 207,700, or a population density of 10,900/km². In 1901 Shoreditch the population density was 44,600/km².

== Coat of arms ==
The borough used coat of arms, but these were never formally granted and, therefore, not official. When the borough was merged to found the London Borough of Hackney, other charges were used to represent Shoreditch in the new coat of arms of the London Borough of Hackney.

== Politics ==
A map showing the wards of Shoreditch Metropolitan Borough as they appeared in 1916.

Under the Metropolis Management Act 1855 any parish that exceeded 2,000 ratepayers was to be divided into wards; as such the incorporated vestry of St Leonard Shoreditch was divided into eight wards (electing vestrymen): No. 1 or Moorfields (18), No. 2 or Church (21), No. 3 or Hoxton (21), No. 4 or Wenlock (18), No. 5 or Whitmore (12), No. 6 or Kingsland (12), No. 7 or Haggerstone (9) and No. 8 or Acton (9).

The metropolitan borough inherited these eight wards for elections: Acton, Church, Haggerston, Hoxton, Kingsland, Moorfields, Wenlock and Whitmore.

=== Parliament constituency ===
For elections to Parliament, the borough was divided into two constituencies:

- Haggerston
- Hoxton

In 1918 the borough's representation was reduced to one seat:

- Shoreditch

In 1950 the borough's representation was reduced to half a seat, when it was merged with Finsbury:

- Shoreditch and Finsbury

== Gallery ==
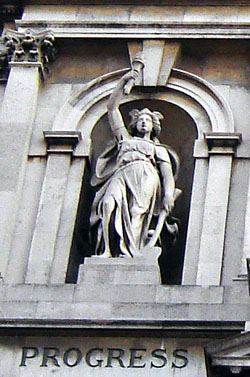
Detail of the town hall facade. Note that the imposing figure representing Progress carries an axe to clear the way to the future. (September 2005)

== See also ==
- London Government Act 1899
- Metropolis Management Act 1855
