= Metropolitan Borough of Hackney =

Borough of the County of London from 1900 to 1965

Coordinates: 51.5451°N 0.0564°W

Hackney
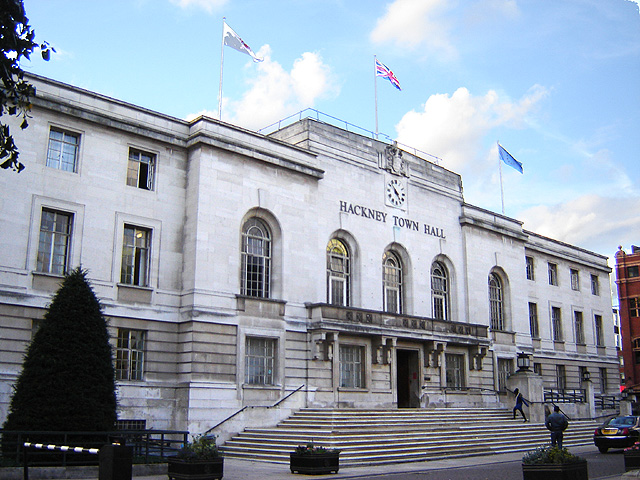
- Hackney Town Hall

- Hackney within the historic County of London
- History
  - Origin: Hackney parish
  - Created: 1900
  - Abolished: 1965
  - Succeeded by: London Borough of Hackney
- Status: Metropolitan borough
- Government: Hackney Borough Council
  - HQ: Mare Street
  - Motto: Justitia Turris Nostra (Justice is our tower)
- Arms of the borough council
- Map of borough boundary

The Metropolitan Borough of Hackney was a metropolitan borough of the County of London from 1900 to 1965. Its area became part of the London Borough of Hackney.

== Formation and boundaries ==
The borough was one of twenty-eight metropolitan boroughs created by the London Government Act 1899. It was the successor to the vestry of the parish of Hackney, which had been the local authority since 1894. Between 1855 and 1894 the parish had been administered with Stoke Newington as the Hackney District.

The boundaries of Hackney with the neighbouring boroughs were adjusted slightly in 1900: Hackney gained the east side of Bethune Road from Stoke Newington and the south side of Balls Pond Road from Islington; it lost the west side of Southgate Road to Islington. The boundary with Shoreditch was altered to run along the Regents Canal, Albion Road and Brougham Road, while the boundary with Bethnal Green, which had formed a straight line, was changed to follow the line of Gore Road. A further adjustment was made in 1908, when areas were exchanged with Tottenham Urban District, Middlesex. It had a border with Leyton Urban District (a municipal borough from 1926) in Essex to the east and to the north, from which it was divided by Hackney Marshes.

The metropolitan borough was coterminous with the ancient parish of Hackney and included the districts of Hackney Central, Clapton, Stamford Hill, Homerton, Dalston and Kingsland. It also included Stoke Newington Common, and the entire eastern side of Stoke Newington High Street.

== Population and area ==
The metropolitan borough was almost coterminous with the ancient parish of Hackney. Statistics were compiled by the London County Council in 1901 to show population growth in London over the preceding century.

The area of the borough in 1901 was 3,289 acres (13.3 km^{2}). The populations recorded in National Censuses were:

Hackney Vestry 1801–1899

Year	1801	1811	1821	1831	1841	1851	1861	1871	1881	1891
Population	12,730	16,771	22,494	31,047	37,771	53,589	76,687	115,110	163,681	198,606

Metropolitan Borough 1900–1961

Year	1901	1911	1921	1931	1941	1951	1961
Population	219,272	222,533	222,142	215,333		171,342	171,342

By comparison, after amalgamation with Shoreditch and Stoke Newington, to form the modern London Borough of Hackney, the combined area became 19.06 km² - approximately 4,710 acres (19.1 km^{2}); in 2005, this had a population of 207,700, or a population density of 10,900/km². In 1901 Hackney the population density was 16,475/km².

== Politics ==
=== Incorporated vestry ===
A map showing the wards of Hackney Metropolitan Borough as they appeared in 1916.

Under the Metropolis Management Act 1855 any parish that exceeded 2,000 ratepayers was to be divided into wards; as such the parish of St John at Hackney within the Hackney District Board of Works was divided into seven wards (electing vestrymen): No. 1 or Stamford Hill (15), No. 2 or West (18), No. 3 or De Beauvoir Town (18), No. 4 or Dalston (18), No. 5 or Hackney (18), No. 6 or Homerton (15) and No. 7 or South (18).

The Hackney Vestry was controlled by the Progressive Party, the grouping linked with the parliamentary Liberal Party. Opposition on the body was provided by the Conservative-backed Moderate Party. The vestry had 119 members, with one third elected annually.

In 1894 as its population had increased the incorporated vestry was re-divided into eight wards (electing vestrymen): Stamford Hill (15), West (18), Kingsland (12), Hackney (12), Mare Street (15), South (15), Clapton (12) and Homerton (21).

=== Borough council ===
The London Government Act 1899 replaced the incorporated vestries with borough councils consisting of a mayor, aldermen and councillors. All councillors were to be elected every three years. There was one alderman for every six councillors, and these were elected by the council itself.

Boundary commissioners were appointed under the London Government Act 1899 to divide the new boroughs into wards, and to apportion councillors to each ward. It was decided to continue to use the eight vestry wards. The Moderates claimed that Stamford Hill and West Hackney wards were under-represented and should be given nine councillors, with the remaining six wards having six each. In the event, the commissioners apportioned 60 councillors between the eight wards: Clapton Park, Hackney, Homerton and Stamford Hill having nine councillors and Downs, Kingsland, South and West wards having six a piece. With 10 aldermen, the borough council thus had 70 members.

==== 1900–1919 ====
The boundary changes seem to have favoured the Moderates, as at the first elections to the council on 1 November 1900 they won a majority with 37 seats to 18 won by the Liberal Party and Progressives, with 3 independent Conservative and 2 independent councillors also returned. At the next election in 1903 the Progressives won control with 49 seats to 11 Conservatives. Three years later the Conservatives ran under the Municipal Reform label. Municipal Reformers won 18 seats and independents supported by them won 20, giving them a majority over the Progressives with 22 seats. The Progressives regained the council in 1909 with a narrow majority, losing power to the Municipal Reform party again in 1912.

==== 1919–1937 ====
The next elections, postponed until 1919 due to the First World War, were won by the Labour Party: Labour won 32 seats, Municipal Reform 15 and Progressives 13. At the next elections in 1922 a "Progressive Reform" anti-Labour alliance won all seats on the council, and held them at the subsequent polls in 1925. The 1928 election was partly run on party lines: the Municipal Reform party won control with 31 seats, other Anti-Labour candidates won 15, Labour won 12 and Progressives 1. In 1931 Municipal Reformers won all but one seat, which was held by Labour. Labour gained control of the borough council in 1934, and held power for the rest of the borough's existence. In 1934 they won 45 seats to 15 won by Municipal Reformers.

==== 1937–1965 ====
In 1937 the borough's ward boundaries were redrawn: sixteen wards were created (Chatham, Culford, Dalston, Downs, Graham, Leaside, Marsh, Maury, Park, Ridley, Southwold, Springfield, Stamford, Town Hall, Tudor and Wick), each represented by three councillors. To the forty-eight councillors thus elected were added 8 aldermen. Labour won 41 seats in 1937 to Municipal Reform's 7. Local elections were postponed due to the Second World War, and from 1945 the only non-Labour councillors were Communists: 1 was elected in 1945, and 2 in 1949. At the last four elections to the council in 1953, 1956, 1959 and 1962 Labour won all the seats.

=== Parliament constituency ===
For elections to Parliament, the borough was divided into three constituencies:

- Hackney Central
- Hackney North
- Hackney South

In 1950 the borough's representation was reduced to one and a half seats, when part of it was merged with Stoke Newington:

- Hackney North and Stoke Newington
- Hackney South

In 1955 the borough's representation was reduced to one and two half seats, when another part of it was merged with Bethnal Green:

- Hackney Central
- Hackney North and Stoke Newington
- Bethnal Green

== Coat of arms ==
The seal of the Hackney Vestry bore a representation of St Augustine's Tower, the remains of the 13th-century parish church. When the metropolitan borough was formed in 1900, the vestry seal was altered by the addition of the Latin motto Justitia Turris Nostra or Justice is our tower, which can be paraphrased as meaning Fairness is our strength.

In January 1924 the borough council resolved to seek a formal grant of armorial bearings from the College of Arms. These were duly made by letters patent dated 31 May 1924. The arms were blazoned as follows:

Per fesse, the chief per pale gules and per fesse Sable and Argent, and the base barry wavy of six Argent and Azure, in the dexter chief a representation of the Hackney Tower proper and in the sinister chief a Maltese Cross per fesse Argent and Gules.
Crest: On a Wreath of the Colours a representation of the Hackney Tower Or.

The "Hackney Tower" appeared in the upper portion of the shield, and formed the crest, placed on a helm and mantling. The 1900 motto was also retained. The Maltese Cross represented the Knights Templar and the Knights Hospitaller. These orders successively held the manor of Hackney, until the Reformation. The Templars wore red crosses on white mantles, and the Hospitallers white crosses on black: these were combined in the design. The wavy white and blue bars at the base of the shield represented the River Lea and the many canals crossing the borough.

These arms gave much inspiration to the coat of arms of the London Borough of Hackney when the London borough was created in 1965.

== Town hall ==
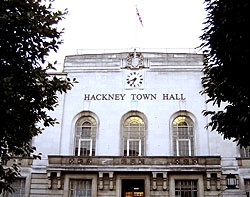
Hackney Town Hall. Headquarters of the Metropolitan borough, still used by the London borough (October 2005)

The borough council was initially based in a "French-Italian" style town hall in Hackney Grove, dating from 1866. The building was extended in 1898. A new Art Deco town hall in Mare Street was begun in 1934, and opened in 1937. It is now the headquarters of the London Borough of Hackney.

== See also ==
- London Government Act 1899
- Metropolis Management Act 1855
