= List of members of the Metropolitan Board of Works =

This is a list of the members of the Metropolitan Board of Works, London, 1855-1889.

Members of the board were not elected by the general public, but were chosen by the City of London Corporation and by the Vestries and District Boards of the Metropolis from among their members.

The first members were elected in December 1855, coming into office in January 1856. From May 1857 one third of the board retired annually, the seats becoming vacant being chosen by ballot. Where casual vacancies occurred these were filled for the remainder of the term these are annotated and explained in the adjoining column..

Over 1885–86 the membership was enlarged: 11 members were added for populous parts of the city. A further Battersea-specific member was added in 1888. These additions are table-coloured lime green.

The board also had a salaried chairman:

- John Thwaites was elected by Greenwich and St Saviours Districts in 1855. He resigned both seats on becoming chairman on 22 December 1855. He was knighted in 1865.
- James Hogg, who had been elected to represent St George Hanover square, succeeded Thwaites on 18 November 1870. He assumed the surname of McGarel Hogg in 1877 and was created Baron Magheramorne in 1887.

Electing authority	Members	Notes
City of London (3)	Henry Lowman Taylor (1855–1883) (a) William Burnham Garrett (1883–1888) (b); George Manners (1888–1889) (c)	(a) Taylor died 7 July 1883. (b) Garrett elected by Common Council 26 July 1883. (c) Garrett resigned, Manners elected 12 July 1888
City of London (3)	Thomas Henry Hall (1855–1856) (a); Alderman William Cubitt (1856–1860) (b); Alderman William Lawrence (1860–1863) (c); Alderman Thomas Quested Finnis (1863–1866) (d); Alderman David Henry Stone (1866–1868) (e); Alderman Sills John Gibbons (1868–1871) (f); Alderman David Henry Stone (1871–1874)(g); Alderman Thomas Sidney (1874–1875) (h); Alderman Sir Francis Wyatt Truscott (1875–1879) (h); Alderman James Figgins (1879–1881) (i); Alderman Simeon Charles Hadley (1881–1883) (j); Alderman Sir Charles Whetham (1884) (k); Alderman John Staples (1884–1885) (k); Alderman Sir Robert Norman Fowler (1885–1886) (l); Alderman Sir John Staples (1886–1888) (m); Alderman Sir Francis Wyatt Truscott (1888–1889) (n)	(a) Hall died 2 October 1856 (b) Cubitt took seat 17 October 1856 He resigned in 1860. (c) Lawrence took his seat on 19 October 1860. (d)Finnis elected 19 November 1863 (e) Finnis resigned, Stone elected May 1866 (f) Stone resigned, Gibbons chosen by Common Council 11 June 1868 (g) Stone resigned on being elected Lord Mayor of London November 1874. (h) Sidney resigned, Truscott elected 3 December 1875. (i) Truscott resigned on becoming Lord Mayor November 1879. Figgins elected 20 November 1879. (j) Figgins resigned, Hadley appointed 1881. (k) Whetham resigned 17 October 1884, Staples elected 30 October 1884. (l) Staples resigned on becoming Lord Mayor, Fowler elected 19 November 1885 (m) Staples died 16 January 1888. (n) Truscott elected 16 February 1888.
City of London (3)	Deputy Edward Harrison (1855–1863) (a) James Ebenezer Saunders (1863–1885)(a); George Shaw (1885–1889)	(a) Harrison resigned, Saunders chosen by Common Council 23 July 1863.
Bermondsey Vestry	Beriah Drew (1855–1858) (a) Cyrus Legg (1858–1881) (b); William Shepherd	(a) Resigned 17 September 1858 (b) Chosen by Bermondsey Vestry 28 September 1858 Resigned 21 January 1881.
Bethnal Green Vestry	Thomas B Beven (1855–1879); Alfred Ewin (1879–1889)(a)	(a) Ewin took seat 14 November 1879
Camberwell Vestry; Representation increased to 2 members in 1885.	Alexander Lodwick Irvine (1855–1858) James Pew (1858–1868); Edward Dresser Rogers (1868–1889)	
Camberwell Vestry; Representation increased to 2 members in 1885.	Andrew Middlemass (1885–1889)(a)	(a) Middlemass died January 1889, seat remained vacant until abolition of board on 21 March 1889.
Chelsea Vestry	Francis Chalmer (1855–1858) (a) William Tite MP (1858–1873) (b); Edward Kingsbury (1873–1885)(c); Charles Mossop (1885–1889)	(a) Chalmer resigned November 1858 (b) Tite took his seat 26 November 1858 He died 20 April 1873. (c) Kingsbury elected by Chelsea Vestry 13 May 1873.
St. James & St. John Clerkenwell Vestry	James Pascall (1855–1861); Denis McDonnell (1861–66) Edward John Thompson (1864–1883) (a); William Robson (1883–1889) (a)	(a) Thompson resigned, Robson chosen by Clerkenwell Vestry 20 September 1883.
Fulham Vestry; From 1886. Previously part of Fulham District.	William Henry Lammin (1886–1887); Philip Pethick Perry (1887–1889)	
Hammersmith Vestry; From 1886. Previously part of Fulham District.	George Brown (1886–1889)	
Fulham District; Fulham District dissolved 1886, see parish vestries: Fulham; Hammersmith	Valentine Stevens (1855–1862 ) (a); William Henry Lammin (1862–1881); George Brown (1881–1886)	(a) Stevens died 30 November 1862.
Greenwich District; Representation increased to 2 members in 1885.	John Thwaites (1855–1856) (a) Alfred Rhodes Bristow (1856–1862) (b); Guildford Barker Richardson (1862–1889)	(a) Thwaites was also elected for St Saviours District. He resigned both seats on being elected chairman 22 December 1855. (b) Bristow took seat 7 January 1856
Greenwich District; Representation increased to 2 members in 1885.	William Andrews (1885–1889)	
Hackney District; Representation increased to 2 members in 1885.	George Offor (1855–1862); John Joseph Tanner (1862–1866); Frederick Clarke (1866-1867) John Runtz (1867–1889)	
Hackney District; Representation increased to 2 members in 1885.	Frederick Cox (1885–1888) (a)	(a) Cox resigned December 1888. Seat remained vacant until dissolution of board.
Hampstead Vestry	Thomas Turner (1855–1859) Philip Hemery Le Breton (1859–1879) (a); Simeon Stone (1879-1880)(a) (b); Henry Harben (1880–1889)(b)	(a) Le Breton resigned 26 September 1879. Stone took his seat 21 November 1879. (b) Stone resigned October 1880. Harben took seat 29 October 1880.
Holborn District	Robert Benton Seeley (1855–1857) (a) John Orde Hall (1857–1880) (b); George Phillips (1880–1889)	(a) Seeley resigned September 1857 (b) Hall elected 23 September 1857
Islington St Mary Vestry (2); Representation increased to 3 members in 1885.	William Dennis (1855–1858) George Peckett (1858–1866) (a); Charles Henry Elt(1866–1882) (b); John Edwin Bradfield (1882–1888) (c); Henry Samuel Friend (1888–1889)	(a) Peckett resigned in October 1866 and died 30 November 1866. (b) Elt took seat 19 October 1866, died 19 May 1882 (c) Bradfield died 16 October 1888.
Islington St Mary Vestry (2); Representation increased to 3 members in 1885.	John Savage(1855–1875)(a); Robert Stephens Cufflin (1875–1878) (a) (b); John Reddish (1878–1887)(b); John Spencer Furlong (1887–1889)	(a) Savage died, Cufflin took seat 10 December 1875. (b) Cufflin died 5 October 1878. Reddish took his seat 25 October 1878.
Islington St Mary Vestry (2); Representation increased to 3 members in 1885.	Samuel Price (1885–1888)(a); Frederick Murray (1888) (b); William Adams (1888–1889)	(a) Price resigned, Murray took seat 24 February 1888. (b) Murray died April 1888.
St Mary Abbott Kensington Vestry; Representation increased to 3 members in 1885.	William Hawkes (1855–1858) (a) Robert Freeman (1858–1887) (b); Jubal Webb (1887–1889)	(a) Hawkes retired 1858 (b) Freeman held the seat from 1858 until his death on 19 January 1887
St Mary Abbott Kensington Vestry; Representation increased to 3 members in 1885.	William A Lindsay (1885–1889)	
St Mary Abbott Kensington Vestry; Representation increased to 3 members in 1885.	William Boutcher (1885–1888); Frederick Charlwood Frye (1888–1889)	
Lambeth Vestry (2); Representation increased to 3 members in 1885.	Frederick Doulton (1855–1868) (a); Francis Hayman Fowler (1868–1888); Captain Charles William Andrew (1888–1889) (b)	(a) Doulton resigned 18 February 1868 (b) Andrew took seat on 22 June 1888 in place of Fowler, resigned.
Lambeth Vestry (2); Representation increased to 3 members in 1885.	Robert Taylor (1855–1881) (a); George Hill (1881–1889)	(a) Taylor died 19 October 1881.
Lambeth Vestry (2); Representation increased to 3 members in 1885.	Peter William Funnell (1885–1889)	
Lewisham District with Plumstead District; Ceased to elect a joint member from 1886, with District Boards of Lewisham and Plumstead each electing a member thereafter.	Charles Atkins (1855–1857) (a) James Brooker (1857–1870) (b); James Richard Lloyd (1870–1885); Edwin Hughes (1885–1886)	(a) Atkins resigned 24 April 1857 (b) Brooker elected May 1857
Lewisham District; From 1886	Theophilus William Williams (1886–1889)	
Plumstead District; From 1886	Colonel Edwin Hughes MP (1886–1889)	
Limehouse District	Benjamin Dixon (1855–1872); William Nathan (1872–1880) (a); John Abbott (1880–1889)	(a) Nathan took his seat following Dixon's resignation, 14 April 1872. He died in January 1880.
Hamlet of Mile End Old Town Vestry	William Ephraim Snow (1855-1862); William Newton (1862–1876) (a); Robert Jones (1876–1879); Theodore Moore (1879–1880); Robert Jones (1880 -1886); Francis John Wood (1886–1887); Henry Cushen (1887–1889)	(a) Newton died 9 March 1876
St Mary Newington Vestry	Ambrose Boyson (1855–1860); Edward Conduitt Dermer (1860–1864); Benjamin Evans (1864–1869); Charles Stuart Barker (1869–1873)(a); William Robbins Selway (1873–1889) (a)	(a) Barker resigned January 1873. Selway took seat 24 January 1873.
Paddington Vestry; Representation increased to 2 members in 1885.	Henry Burslem (1855–1860); Charles Mills Roche (1860–1881); William Urquhart (1881–1884) Thomas George Fardell (1884–1889)	
Paddington Vestry; Representation increased to 2 members in 1885.	William Urquhart (1885–1888); Mark Hayler Judge (1888–1889)(a)	(a) Judge took seat on 22 June 1888 in place of Urquhart, resigned.
Poplar District Representation increased to 2 members in 1885.	Simon Knight (1855–1861); Joseph d'Aguilar Samuda (1861–1865); Edward Rider Cook (1865–1889)	
Poplar District Representation increased to 2 members in 1885.	John Lenanton (1885–1889)	
Rotherhithe Vestry with St Olave District	William Misken (1855–1857) Alderman John Humphery (1857–1863) (a); Benjamin Lucas Judkins (1863–1866); Thomas Turner (1866–1875) (b); John Tolhurst (1875–1889)	(a) Humphery died 28 September 1863 (b) Turner resigned, Tolhurst took seat 26 November 1875.
St George Hanover Square Vestry (2)	Henry Arthur Hunt (1855–1856) (a) John Leslie (1856–1861) (b); Henry George Robinson (1861–1864); Charles Westerton (1864–1872); General Sir William Codrington (1872–1877) (c); Dr. William Brewer MP (1878–1881)(d); Hon. Alan de Tatton Egerton (1881–1889)	(a) Hunt resigned 7 March 1856 on appointment to a government post (b) Leslie took seat 16 March 1856 He died in December 1879. (c) Codrington took seat following death of Westerton 17 May 1872. (d) Codrington resigned and Brewer took seat 18 January 1878. (d) Brewer died 3 November 1881. (e) Hogg gave up his seat on being elected chairman in November 1870. (f) Fitzroy took his seat 16 January 1880. (g) Fitzroy resigned and Webster took his seat 19 June 1885.
St George Hanover Square Vestry (2)	Major William Lyon (1855–1858); Joseph Bennett (1858–1864); Major William Lyon (1864–1867); Colonel James Hogg (1867–1870)(e); Dr. William Brewer MP (1870–1873)(e); John Leslie (1873–1879) (b); Lord Frederick John Fitzroy (1880–1885)(f); Robert Grant Webster (1885–1888)(g); Colonel Howard Vincent MP (1888–1889)	(a) Hunt resigned 7 March 1856 on appointment to a government post (b) Leslie took seat 16 March 1856 He died in December 1879. (c) Codrington took seat following death of Westerton 17 May 1872. (d) Codrington resigned and Brewer took seat 18 January 1878. (d) Brewer died 3 November 1881. (e) Hogg gave up his seat on being elected chairman in November 1870. (f) Fitzroy took his seat 16 January 1880. (g) Fitzroy resigned and Webster took his seat 19 June 1885.
St George in the East Vestry	Philip Crellin (1855–1865); William Clark (1865–1876)(a); Thomas W Fairclough (1876–1888)(a); Richard Stevens Sly (1888–1889)	(a) Fairclough took his seat 14 January 1876 following the death of Clark on 19 December 1875.
St Giles District	Captain Edward Barnett, RN (1855–1857) Lieutenant Colonel John Pitt Kennedy (1857–1860) (a); Borlase Hill Adams (1860–1885) (b); William Henry Hewitt (1885-1888)(c); Lieutenant-Colonel Edward James Gardiner (1888–1889) (d)	(a) Kennedy resigned 27 April 1860 (b) Adams died 29 April 1885 (c) Hewitt took his seat 8 May 1885. (d) Gardiner took his seat 8 May 1888 following Hewitt's resignation
St Luke Middlesex Vestry	Joseph Moreland (1855–1875) (a); Alfred J Walker (1875–1878) (a); Joseph Storey (1878–1879) (b); Sir Edmund Hay Currie (1879) (b) (c); Dr. Frederick Ingoldby (1879–1887)(c); George Berry (1887–1889)	(a) Moreland died July 1875. Walker took his seat 8 August 1875. (b) Storey resigned June 1879, Currie took his seat 20 June 1879. (c) Currie resigned, Ingoldby took seat 21 November 1879.
St Martin in the Fields Vestry	William Henry Dalton (1855–1884) (a); George James (1884–1889)	(a) Dalton died June 1884. James took his seat 20 July 1884.
St Marylebone Vestry (2)	John Augustus Nicholay (1855–1873) (a); George Edwards (1873–1889)(b)	(a) Nicholay died 21 November 1873. (b) Edwards took his seat 19 December 1873
St Marylebone Vestry (2)	Thomas D’Iffanger junior (1855–1865) (a); Alexander Nesbitt Shaw (1865–1872) (b); Charles Carr (1872–1881) (c); George Arthur Poland (1881–1882) (d); William Debenham (1882–1889)	(a) D'Iffanger died 1865. (b) Shaw died 1872. (c) Carr was elected by St Marylebone Vestry 11 October 1872. He died in January 1881. (d) Poland took his seat on 21 January 1881. He resigned on 29 September 1882.
St Pancras Vestry (2); Representation increased to 3 members in 1885.	William Corrie (1855–1856)(a) Johnathon Rashleigh (1856–1858)(c); Rev. Robert Eckett (1858–1862); Francis Healey (1862–1872) (b); James Watkins (1873–1882); William James Wetenhall (1882–1889)	(a) Corrie resigned seat. (b) Healey died 6 December 1872. (c) Rashleigh took seat 5 December 1856
St Pancras Vestry (2); Representation increased to 3 members in 1885.	Josiah Wilkinson (1855–1863); Silas Taylor (1863–1871)(a); Robert Furniss (1871–1889)(b)	(a) Taylor died March 1871. (b) Furniss was elected by St Pancras Vestry 5 April 1871.
St Pancras Vestry (2); Representation increased to 3 members in 1885.	Frederick George Baker (1885–1889)	
St Saviour's District	John Thwaites (1855)(a) Charles Harris (1856–1886)(b); Thomas Francis Rider (1886–1889)	(a) Thwaites was also elected for Greenwich District. He resigned both seats on being elected chairman 22 December 1855. (b) Harris took his seat 7 January 1856 He died on 18 November 1886.
Shoreditch St Leonard Vestry (2)	John Ware (1855–1862) (a); Jeremiah Long (1862–1869) (b); Henry Dodd (1869–1872) (b); George Rooke (1872–1878) (c) (d); Thomas Turner (1878–1886) (e); Edwin Lawrence (1886–1889)	(a) Ware resigned 5 December 1862 (b)Long resigned and Dodd took his seat 5 February 1869. (c) Rooke took his seat following Dodd's resignation, 14 April 1872. (d) Rooke resigned 1 November 1878. (e) Turner died February 1886, Lawrence took his seat 19 March 1886.
Shoreditch St Leonard Vestry (2)	William Arnold Hadden Hows (1855–1859); Edward Shepherd (1859–1865); William Arnold Hadden Hows (1865–1871)(a); Alfred Lawrence (1871–1875)(a); William Halford Fell (1875–1885)(b); Major Frederick Moore Wenborn (1885–1889) (c)	(a) Lawrence took seat 19 May 1871 following resignation of Hows. (b) Fell resigned 23 October 1885 (c) Wenborn took his seat 3 November 1885.
Southwark St George the Martyr Vestry	Edward Collinson (1855–1857); Edward Palmer (1857–1862) (a); Edward Collinson (1862–1871) (b); Alfred Redman (1871–1875) (b) (c); Alfred Pocock (1875–1887) (d); Alexander Hawkins (1887–1888) (e)	(a) Palmer died 23 April 1862. (b) Collinson resigned and Redman took his seat 21 April 1871. (c) Redman resigned and Pocock took his seat 18 June 1875. (d) Pocock died 17 May 1887. (e) Hawkins resigned 19 October 1888. The seat remained vacant until the dissolution of the board.
Strand District	Charles Few (1855–1857) John Samuel Phillips (1857–1879) (a); John Jones (1879–1889)	(a) Phillips died 4 January 1879.
Wandsworth District; Representation increased to 3 members in 1885.	William Carpmael (1855–1867) (a); George Pitney Meaden (1867–1889)	(a) Carpmael died 9 July 1867.
Wandsworth District; Representation increased to 3 members in 1885.	Benjamin Weir (1885–1889)	
Wandsworth District; Representation increased to 3 members in 1885.	Andrew Cameron (1885–1886); Edward Wood (1886-1887); Andrew Cameron (1887-1889)	
Battersea Vestry in Wandsworth District until April 1888; member added:	Nathaniel Purdy (1888-1889)	
Westminster District	Alexander Wright (1855–1859); Samuel Hughes (1859–1862); Taverner John Miller (1862-1868); Thomas J White (1868–1889)	
Westminster St James Vestry	Sir John Villiers Shelley MP (1855–)(a) Henry Bidgood (1856–1877)(b); Thomas Henry Elam (1877–1886)(c); John Bonthron (1886–1889)	(a) Shelley resigned 1 January 1856 before the first meeting of the board (b) Bidgood took his seat 14 January 1856 (c) Elam took his seat following Bidgood's resignation 26 January 1877. He resigned due to ill health in January 1886.
Whitechapel District	George Starkins Wallis (1855–1864) (a); Thomas Brushfield (1864–1875) (a); Colonel Donald Munro (1875–1888) (b); George Ilsley (1888–1889) (c)	(a) Wallis died 10 October 1864, Brushfield nominated in his place 4 November 1864 (b) Munro took seat following death of Brushfield, 8 October 1875. (c) Munro died May 1888.
Woolwich Local Board of Health	Lewis Davis (1855–1857) George Hudson (1857–1878); William Parry Jackson (1878–1881); John Robert Jolly (1881–1889)	
