= 1819 in architecture =

The year 1819 in architecture involved some significant architectural events and new buildings.

== Events ==
- Construction of Karlsborg Fortress in Sweden begins.
- Construction of Mikhailovsky Palace in Saint Petersburg begins.
- Sculptural work begins at the Schauspielhaus in Berlin (the modern-day Konzerthaus Berlin), designed by Karl Friedrich Schinkel.

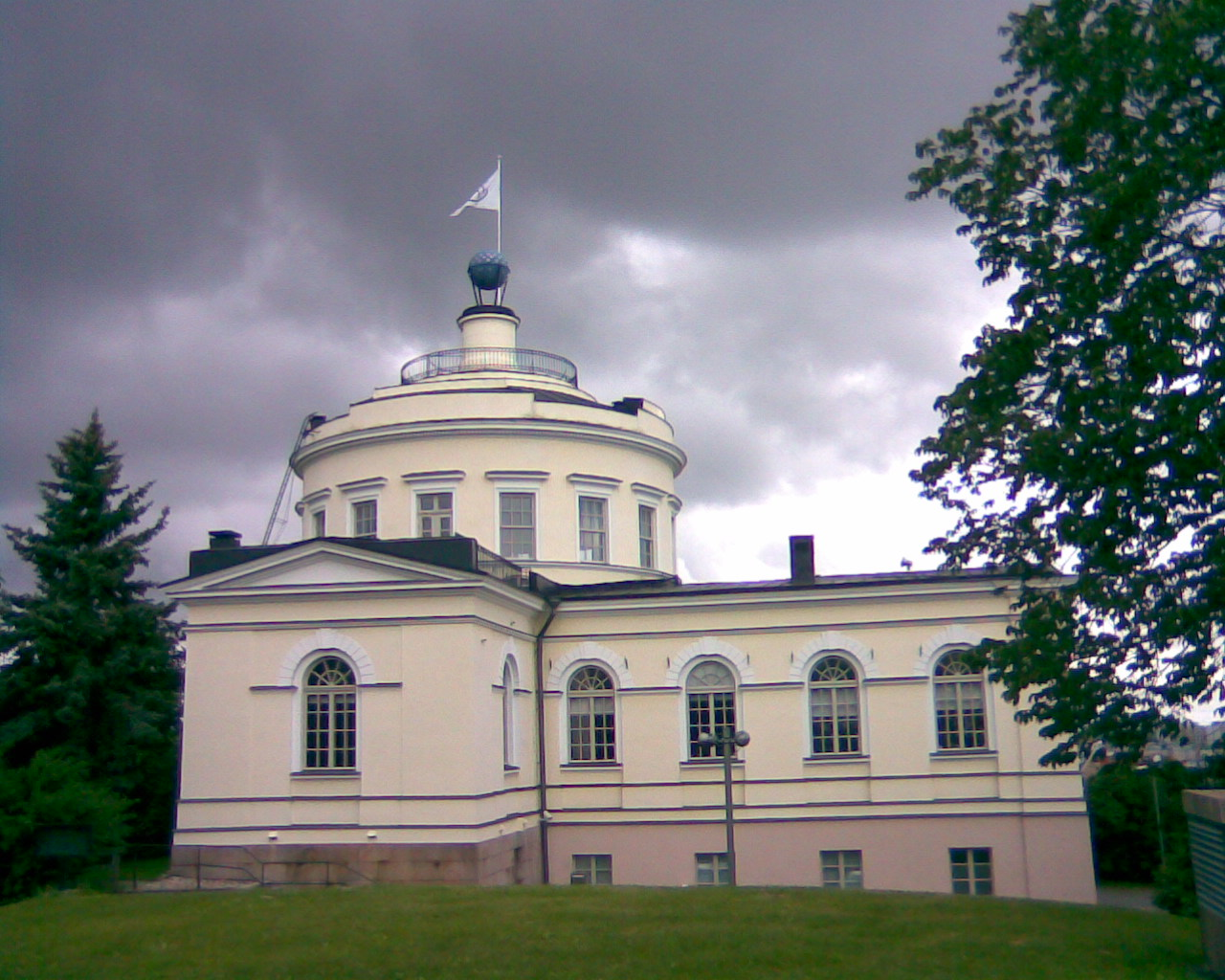
Vartiovuori Observatory

== Buildings and structures ==
=== Buildings completed ===
- Casa de la Guerra, Santa Barbara, USA
- Cathedral Church of St. Paul, Boston, USA, designed by Alexander Parris and Solomon Willard
- Greek-Catholic Church in Giurtelecu Şimleului, Romania (demolished in 1973)
- The Plymouth Athenaeum, England, designed by John Foulston (destroyed in 1941)
- New Théâtre de l'Odéon in Paris, designed by Pierre Thomas Baraguay (opened in September)
- Vartiovuori Observatory, Turku, Finland

== Awards ==
- Grand Prix de Rome, architecture: Félix-Emmanuel Callet and Jean-Baptiste Lesueur.

== Births ==
- January 20 – Edward Milner, English landscape architect (died 1884)
- February 8 – John Ruskin, English polymath and critic (died 1900)
- May 15 – Alphonse Balat, Belgian architect (died 1895)

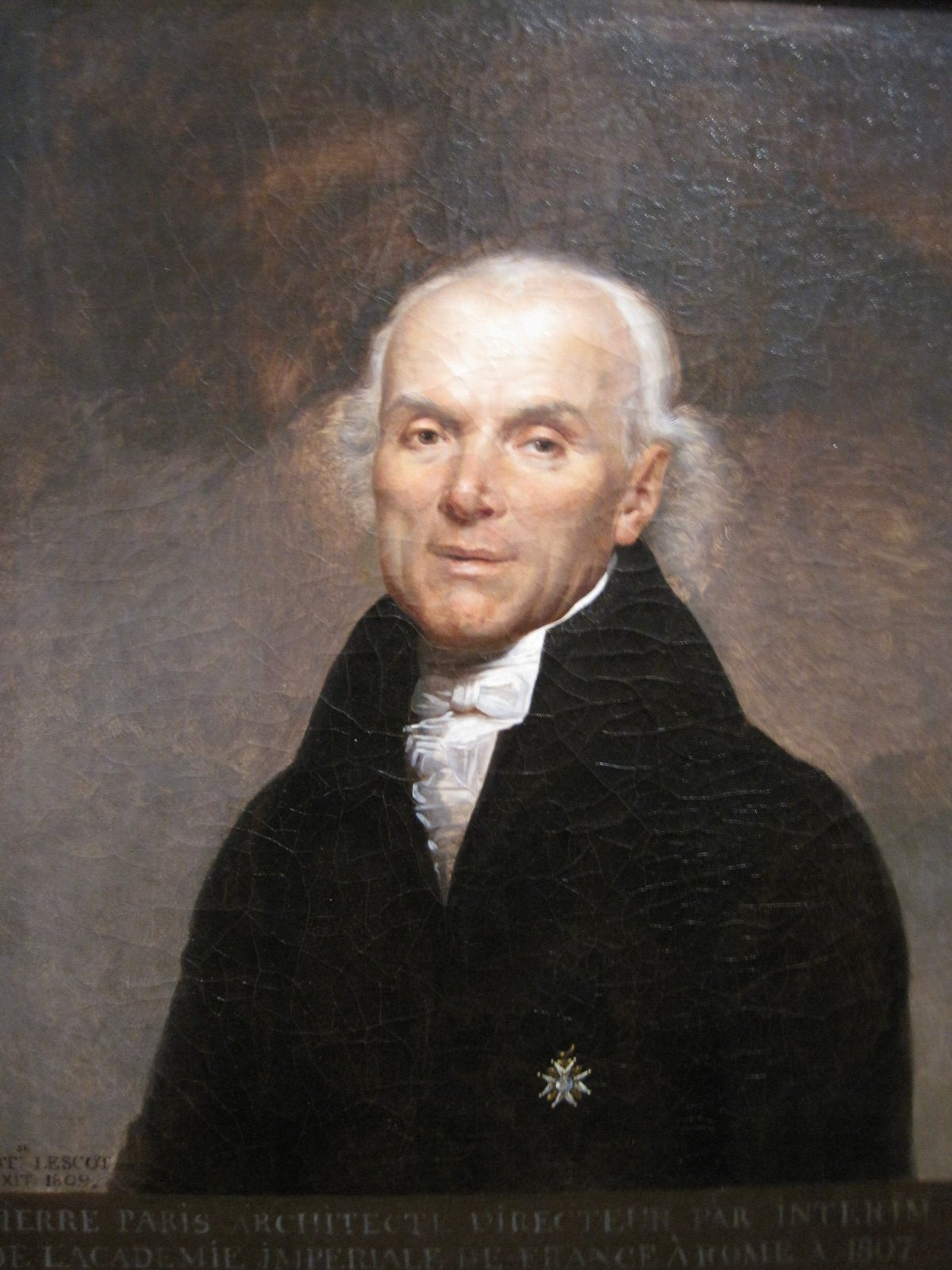
Pierre-Adrien Pâris

- May 20 – Sir Horace Jones, Architect and Surveyor to the City of London (died 1887)
- Approximate date – Francis Fowler, English architect (died 1893)

== Deaths ==
- January 22 – Gian Antonio Selva, Italian neoclassical architect (born 1751)
- March 13 – Charles Wyatt, English politician and architect (born 1758)
- August 1 – Pierre-Adrien Pâris, French architect, painter and designer (born 1745)
