= Shoreditch Town Hall =

Municipal building in London, England

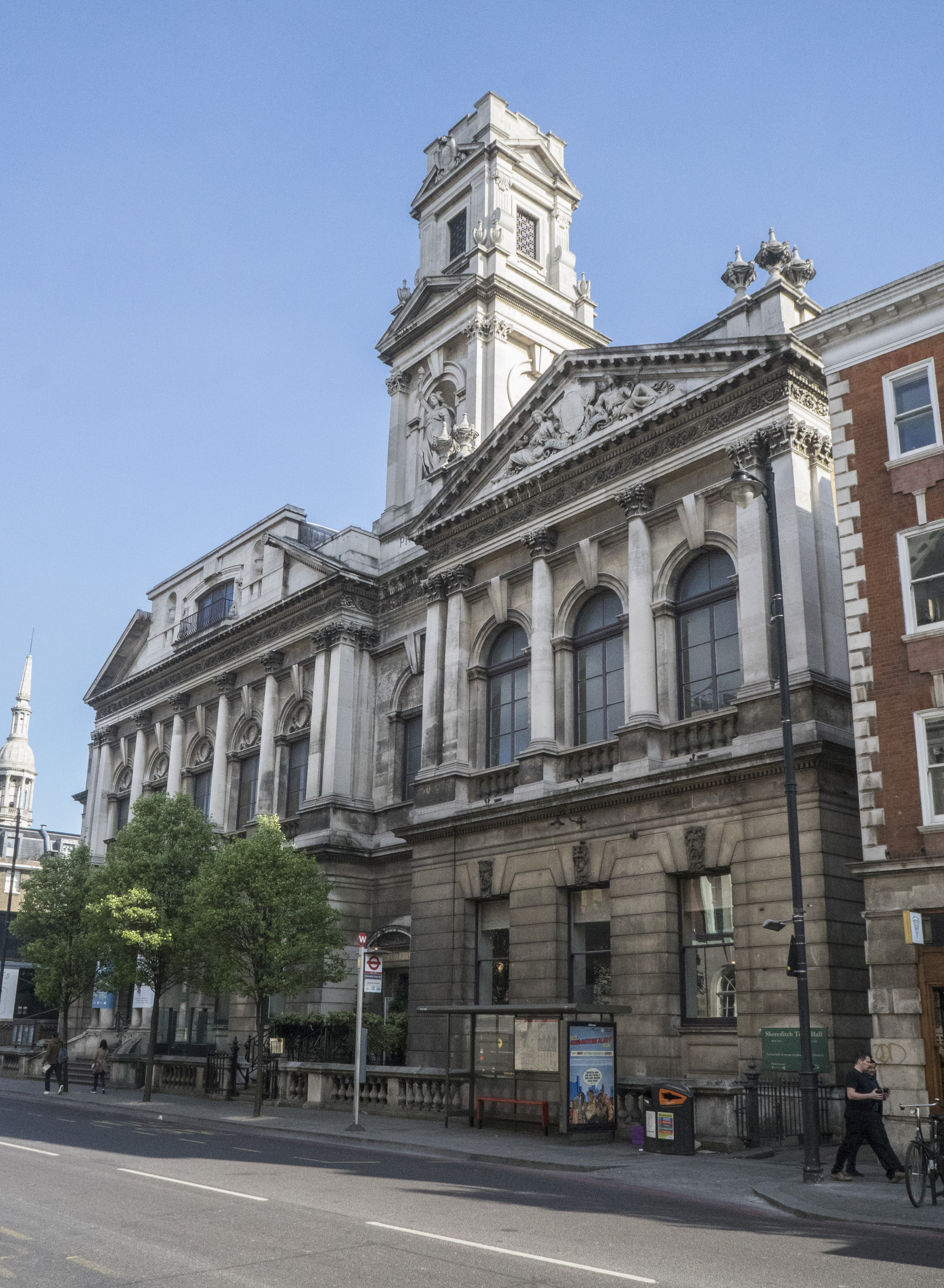
- Shoreditch Town Hall

- Shown in Hackney
- 51.5270°N 0.0791°W
- Location: Old Street, Shoreditch

History
- Built: 1866

Site notes
- Architect: Caesar Augustus Long
- Architectural style: Italianate style

Listed Building – Grade II
- Designated: 4 February 1975
- Reference no.: 1235232

Shoreditch Town Hall is an independent cultural, live events and community space in Shoreditch, London. The building, which previously served as the headquarters of the Metropolitan Borough of Shoreditch, is a Grade II listed building.

== History ==
In the mid-19th century, the vestry board decided to procure a vestry hall for the Parish of St. Leonard's; the site they selected had been occupied by some old almshouses known as "Fuller's Hospital".

The foundation stone for the new building was laid by the Chairman of the Metropolitan Board of Works, John Thwaites, in 1865. The new building, the eastern section of the current complex, was designed by Caesar Augustus Long in the Italianate style, built by John Perry of Stratford and completed in 1866. The design involved a symmetrical main frontage with five bays facing onto Old Street; the central section featured a tetrastyle porch with Ionic order columns on the ground floor; there were windows interspersed with Corinthian order columns and pilasters on the first floor and a large pediment above. At the time it was described as "the grandest vestry hall in London". The building was embellished with symbolic statuary alluding to the borough motto, "More Light, More Power", which refer to the council's aim of generating its own electricity to power local industry.

On 12 November 1888 the inquest into the death of Mary Jane Kelly, the last victim of the Whitechapel murders, was held in the building.

Following the creation of the Metropolitan Borough of Shoreditch in 1899, the building was extended westwards by adding a tower and an extra three bays to the five bays that already existed. The foundation stone for the extension was laid by the mayoress, Mrs Sarah Ellen Kershaw, on 9 September 1901. The design by William Hunt created a monumental structure which was completed in 1902. Internally, the principal rooms were the council chamber and mayor's parlour at the rear of the building on the ground floor and a large assembly hall in the east part of the building on the first floor. After a major fire in the assembly hall, that part of the building was rebuilt to the designs of Alfred Cross in 1904. An additional wing to the south of the main building was added in 1938.

The building ceased to be the local seat of government after the formation of the London Borough of Hackney in 1965. It was subsequently used as a venue for boxing and other events and in 1969 Ulric Regis died from brain injuries soon after being outpointed by Joe Bugner at the town hall. In the 1990s the assembly hall served as a night club featuring trance music hosted by the Whirl-Y-Gig dance club.

After a period of neglect, it passed into the ownership of the newly formed Shoreditch Town Hall Trust in 1997. Following an extensive restoration programme, the building reopened in 2004 as a venue for community, cultural and small business uses. Further works to improve facilities in 2012 allowed it to develop as an arts and events venue.
