= Turku observatory =

Turku observatory may refer to:

- Vartiovuori observatory, an old observatory building in Turku, Finland
- Iso-Heikkilä Observatory, a former university observatory in Iso-Heikkilä district of Turku, now used by amateur astronomers
- Tuorla Observatory of the department of astronomy at the University of Turku in Finland
