= Mark Judge (architect) =

British architect (1847–1927)

- Born: 26 February 1847; United Kingdom
- Died: 25 January 1927 (aged 79); United Kingdom
- Occupations: Architect, social engineer

Mark Hayler Judge, originally Mark Hayler (26 February 1847 – 25 January 1927) was a British architect and sanitary engineer who was notable for his fight to reform the Metropolitan Board of Works in London in the 1880s.

== Early life ==
Judge was the son of George Hayler, who lived in Battle, Sussex and had been a noted Chartist campaigner. Judge's younger brother was Guy Hayler, who was a noted teetotal Temperance movement organiser. Judge attended St. Mary's National School and Parker's Endowed School at Hastings. It was in 1861 that he changed his name in recognition of an inheritance. He trained as an architect but immediately specialised in sanitation and hygiene schemes, and was appointed as the first curator of the Parkes Museum of Hygiene at University College London. He was also the founder and Hon. Secretary of the Sunday Society which campaigned for the opening of museums on Sundays (the President was the Dean of Westminster Abbey).

== Professional experience ==
Hygiene was of increasing importance to the late Victorians as cities grew in population and needed extensive sewerage systems. Judge's experience led to him being appointed Chief Surveyor to the Sanitary Assurance Association from 1880, and he was also Secretary of the International Medical and Sanitary Exhibition at Kensington in 1881. Judge set up his professional practice on Park Place Villas in Maida Vale.

== Involvement in local government ==
In London, the Metropolitan Board of Works was responsible for sanitary work. Judge came to the belief that the structure of the Board, with the members of which were nominated by individual vestries rather than being directly elected, was fundamentally corrupt. In 1886 the Financial News printed allegations that officials of the board had conspired with some members to make personal profits from the sale of surplus land. That November, Judge obtained a seat on Paddington Vestry and established the grandly-titled "Metropolitan Board of Works Enquiry Committee" which looked into allegations of corruption.

The Financial News allegations were of such magnitude that a Royal Commission had to be set up under Lord Herschell in 1887. Judge's Committee was represented at the Commission by its own counsel and Judge tried to assist by requesting, in his capacity as a ratepayer, the records of the Board; he was supposed to keep these records confidential, but by giving them to counsel he ensured that they were made public. In addition, in the midst of the scandal, one of Paddington's seats on the Board fell vacant and the Vestry chose Judge as its new representative; he was cheered by the public gallery on 22 June 1888 when taking his seat.

== Member of the Board ==
Judge was firm in his belief that corruption was entrenched at the Board, but the Commission found otherwise. Although the Financial News allegations were predominantly upheld (and more corruption was uncovered), the Commission stated that the vast majority of members of the Board were entirely above suspicion. Judge was audibly dissatisfied with the conclusion; he had moved at the Board (16 November 1888) for a special committee to consider prosecutions of corrupt officers and members, but failed to find a seconder. On 14 December, he deliberately disrupted the meeting by insisting on disputing the accuracy of the minutes (the Board passed a motion that he be no longer heard), and then proceeded through the meeting "with a continuous cannonade of objections" (according to The Times).

However, the question of reform of the Board had become moot by the announcement as the Royal Commission was beginning its hearing that it would be abolished and replaced by an elected London County Council. Judge announced his candidacy for the Paddington North division in which he was supported by the local Liberal association. With 1,043 votes he came bottom of the poll and resigned his seat on the Board stating that the electors had not expressed their confidence in him and so he could not remain.

== Later life ==
In later life, Judge took up some other causes including the expansion of higher education (he founded the University Extension Guild in 1903). In 1905 he established the 'British Constitutional Association' (it became the 'British Constitution Association' two years later) which organised lecture meetings on broadly socially progressive topics; although not formally linked to the Liberal Party. During the First World War, the Association made a strong attack on the sale of honours through a petition presented by Lord Parmoor to the House of Lords.

Judge also kept up correspondence with The Times on sanitary issues. He was Chairman of the Committee on War Damage from 1915. During his last decade he suffered from prolonged ill health.
