= Westminster Palace Hotel =

Luxury hotel in Victorian London

Coordinates: 51.49951753°N 0.13018538°W

The Westminster Palace Hotel was a luxury hotel in London, located in the heart of the political district. Opened in 1860, the hotel was the scene of many significant meetings, including the London Conference of 1866 which finalised the details for the confederation of Canada. It also served as the office building of the India Office of the British government for several years in the 1860s. It was demolished in 1974.

== Opening ==
The hotel opened in 1860 on Victoria Street, directly opposite Westminster Abbey and close to the Palace of Westminster, the meeting place for the Parliament. It had all the latest technology, including being the first hotel in London with hydraulic lifts, advertised as able to "convey the occupant of the highest floor to his resting place with as little fatigue as if he were located on the first floor".

== India Office ==
Westminster Palace Hotel Company's Act 1864
- Act of Parliament
- Parliament of the United Kingdom
- Long title: An Act to confer upon the Westminster Palace Hotel Company, Limited, further Powers with respect to Arrangements between them and Her Majesty's Principal Secretary of State in Council of India, and for other Purposes connected with their Undertaking.
- Citation: 27 & 28 Vict. c. lxvi

Dates
- Royal assent: 23 June 1864

Shortly after the hotel was built, the newly constituted India Office was looking for office space. In 1860, the India Office leased a 140-room wing at the rear of the building, at a rate of £6,000 per year. Since the Council of India met at the India Office, it meant that India was being governed from the hotel. The India Office remained there for seven years, until it moved to its permanent new offices in Whitehall in 1867.

== Confederation of Canada: London Conference, 1866 ==
In 1866, the hotel was the location for the London Conference, the third and final conference leading to the Confederation of Canada in 1867. Some contemporary accounts referred to the conference as the Westminster Palace Hotel Conference.

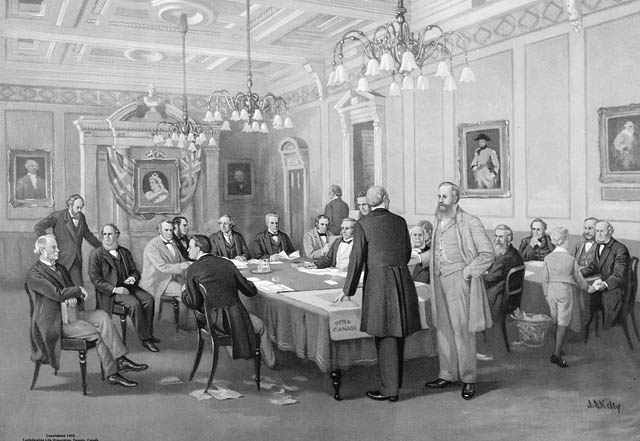
The Fathers of Confederation meeting in the Conference Chamber, Westminster Palace Hotel, 24 December 1866.

Sixteen delegates from the Province of Canada, Nova Scotia and New Brunswick met in London at the end of 1866 to agree upon the final details for Confederation. The delegates from the Province of Canada stayed at the hotel, while the Maritimers stayed at the Alexandra Hotel. The meetings were held in the Conference Chamber of the Westminster Palace Hotel. Based on the agreement reached at the Conference on Christmas Eve, 1866, the Colonial Secretary, the Earl of Carnarvon, introduced the British North America Act 1867 in Parliament. The bill passed and received royal assent on 29 March 1867, coming into force on 1 July 1867.

== Gandhi ==
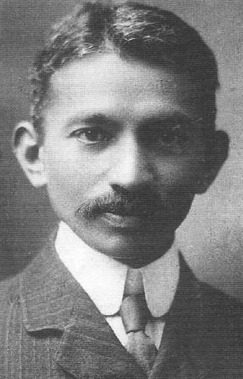
Gandhi in the early 20th century, when he stayed at the hotel

In 1909, Mohandas Gandhi stayed at the hotel. He occupied the room which had been the office of Sir Richard Vivian, a former military commander in Madras, as well as a member of the Council of India. It is not known if Gandhi was aware of the former use of the hotel by the India Office.

== Closing and demolition ==
The hotel was converted to offices in the 1920s and demolished in 1974. The site is now occupied by a branch of Barclays Bank.
