= Robert Worley (architect) =

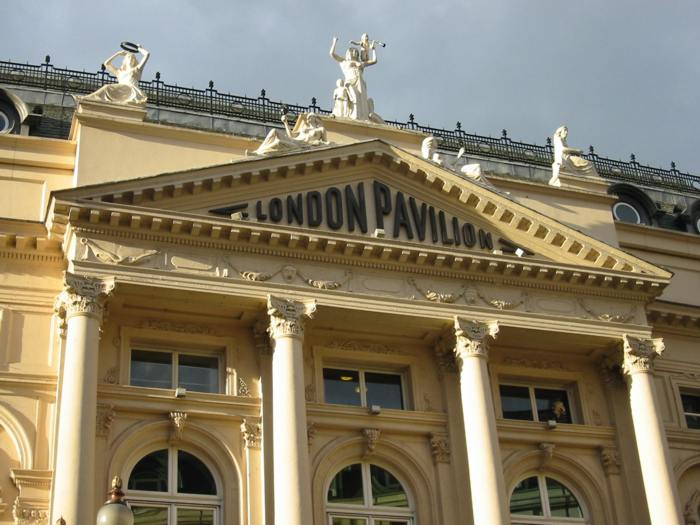
London Pavilion façade in 2002

Robert James Worley (1850–1930) was a British architect.

== Early life ==
He was the brother of fellow architect Charles Worley.

== Career ==
Allinson states that Robert Worley, of the architectural practice Worley & Saunders, was "involved in all kinds of speculative developments". He and his brother Charles are listed jointly as the architects of 41 Harley Street.

Robert Worley and James Ebenezer Saunders formed the architectural practice Worley & Saunders.

Worley designed Sicilian Avenue, Holborn and the London Pavilion (now part of the Trocadero Centre), Piccadilly Circus, and Albert Court, a mansion block next to the Royal Albert Hall, all of which are now Grade II listed).

== Buildings ==
His surviving buildings include:

- 41 Harley Street, jointly with Charles Worley
- London Pavilion with James Ebenezer Saunders (1885)
- Arundel House, 22 The Drive, Hove (1899)
- Sicilian Avenue, London (1910)
