= Charles Sonnhammer =

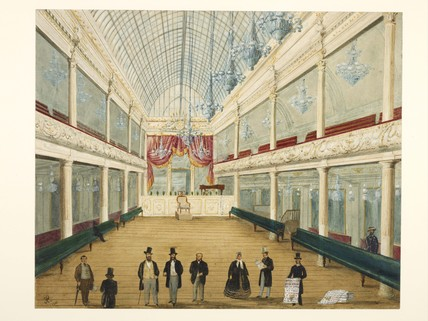
Interior of the newly opened London Pavilion Music Hall, 1861. Sonnhammer and Loibl are probably the figures in top hats at the front.

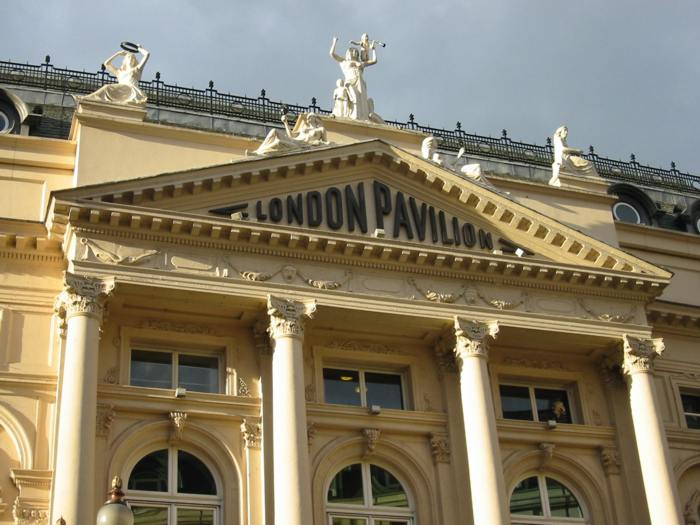
The London Pavilion today.

Charles Sonnhammer was the owner, with Emil Loibl (or Loible), of the London Pavilion music hall. In 1872 they established an "oyster warehouse" at 18 Coventry Street. It stood on the corner with Great Windmill Street. Sonnhammer became the sole owner in 1875 following the break up of his partnership with Loibl in 1874. The business changed ownership again in 1876 and once more in 1891 when it became known as Scott's Oyster and Supper Rooms, located at numbers 18 and 19.
