= John Staples (Lord Mayor) =

British Leatherseller and politician

Sir John Staples (4 December 1815 – 16 January 1888) was a British Leatherseller and politician. He served as the Lord Mayor of London in 1885, and Sheriff of the City of London in 1877.

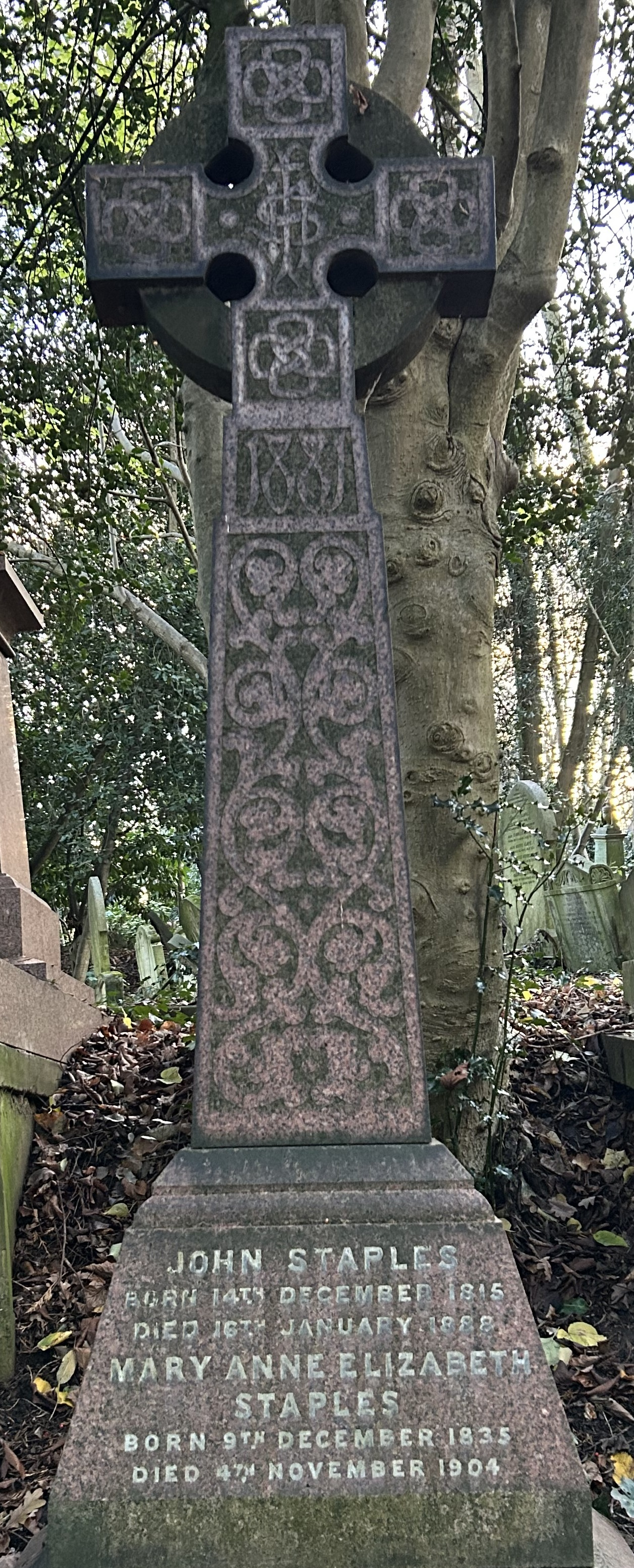
Grave of John Staples in Highgate Cemetery

== Life and work ==
Staples was born 4 December 1815. His father John was a native of Laverstock, Wiltshire.

He was a Master of the Worshipful Company of Leathersellers. The Federation by the Governors of the Leathersellers' Federation of Schools established the Sir John Staples Society in his honour.

He was a Member of the Metropolitan Board of Works for the City of London (1884-1885).

Staples died on 16 January 1888, aged 73 and was buried on the western side of Highgate Cemetery.
