= Francis Fowler (architect) =

British architect

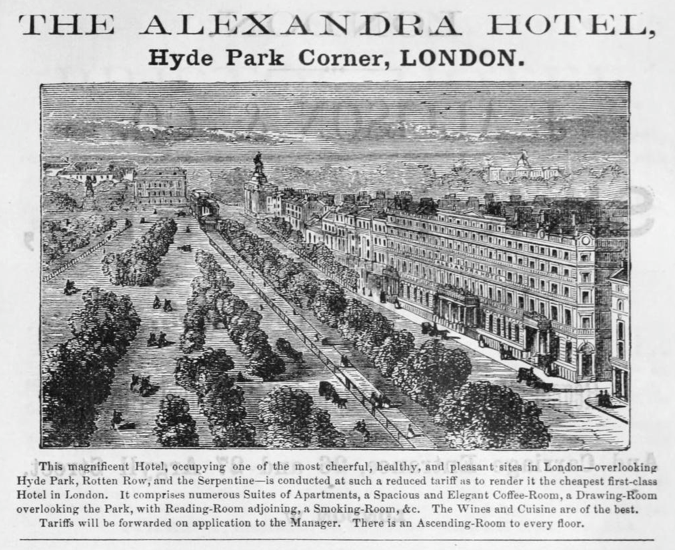
The Alexandra Hotel in an 1885 advertisement

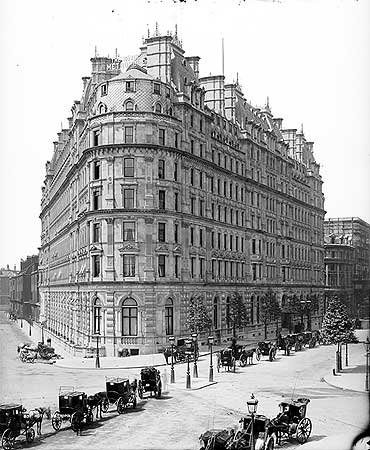
Metropole Hotel, Northumberland Avenue, London

Francis Edmund Hayman Fowler (c. 1819 – 24 February 1893) was a British architect who designed the Metropole Hotel (now the Corinthia Hotel London) with James Ebenezer Saunders. He was a member of the Metropolitan Board of Works but was forced to resign after being found guilty of corruption.

== Early life and family ==
Francis Edmund Hayman Fowler was born around 1819 and baptised in that year in Bristol. His parents were John and Ann Fowler. He had a sister Eliza.

In February 1849, Fowler married Caroline Neville Nichols, daughter of Charles Nichols, at St James The Less, Thorndike Street, London. In 1850, he was living at 21 Savile Row, St James, according to the Rate Books for that year.

== Early career ==
Early in his career he suffered a reversal when he was bankrupted in 1852 in connection with a property transaction. His address at the time was Brownlow Road, Dalston, late of Vauxhall Road. The profession given was "builder". But by the early 1860s he was working as an architect and was responsible for the design of the expansion of the Alexandra Hotel, Knightsbridge, (originally the Wallace Hotel) which opened in 1864.

In 1865 he was promoted from lieutenant to captain in the London Irish Rifle Volunteer Corps.

== Metropolitan Board of Works scandal ==
In the 1880s, Fowler designed the Metropole Hotel (now the Corinthia Hotel London) in Northumberland Avenue, London, with fellow architect James Ebenezer Saunders (1829–1909), both having been appointed by the Metropolitan Board of Works. The hotel opened in 1885.

He was a member of the Metropolitan Board of Works (MBW, the predecessor of the London County Council) for Lambeth Vestry from 1868 until his resignation in 1888. Fowler was considered to be a "pillar" of the MBW, and was chairman of the movement to abolish tolls for bridges across the Thames, for which he had done "important and useful work". He was found guilty of corruption, and forced to resign.

Rumours circulated that Saunders had exploited his position as an MBW member to obtain commissions for architectural work. The Financial News had hinted that his role as an architect on the London Pavilion and the Metropole and Grand Hotels in Northumberland Avenue were "simply because of his position" at the MBW. Fowler and Saunders were both members of the Building Acts Committee and both were on its five-man theatres subcommittee. Despite years of rumours, it took a Royal Commission, the Herschell Commission, to remove them, and they expressed shock that both men refused to admit that they had "behaved reprehensibly". Fowler "made himself out to be unbelievably naive".

== Death ==
Fowler died on 24 February 1893. At the time of his death he was living at Sintra House, Acre Lane, Brixton. His estate was valued at £15,662 (£2 million as of 2023). He left to his son Sydney his leasehold house in Fleet Street and to Mary Laura Ray, £200, his household effects and a lifetime annuity of £200. He left similar legacies and annuities to Ethel Ray; his sister-in-law, Helen Drummond Fowler; Anne Murray and his sister, Eliza Fowler. Fowler charged his freehold houses at Newcastle Street, Strand, and Regent Hall, Oxford Street, with the payment of the annuities. The rest of his estate was left equally to his two sons.

== Selected publications ==
- Facts and fallacies relative to the Main Drainage Scheme of the Metropolitan Board of Works. Edward Stanford, London, 1859.
