= British Constitution Association =

The British Constitution Association, founded in 1905 as the British Constitutional Association, was a pressure group designed to oppose increasing state regulation, whether from the Liberal Party's New Liberalism or Joseph Chamberlain's proposals for Tariff Reform. It has been described as "a curious mixture of unionist free traders, orthodox poor law administrators, and followers of Herbert Spencer".

Its first president was Lord Hugh Cecil, who was succeeded by Lord Balfour of Burleigh. Its supporters included the constitutional expert A. V. Dicey, Lord Avebury, Lord Courtney, John St Loe Strachey, Professor Flinders Petrie, Thomas Mackay, and Hugh Elliott.
