= Greek-Catholic Church in Giurtelecu Șimleului =

Church in Giurtelecu Șimleului, Romania

- Biserica greco-catolică Sf. Arhangheli din Giurtelecu Șimleului
- Location within Romania

Religion
- Affiliation: Romanian Greek-Catholic Church
- Region: Sălaj County
- Rite: Greek-Catholic
- Ecclesiastical or organizational status: parish church, Greek Catholic Vicariate of Şimleu Silvaniei
- Year consecrated: 1819

Location
- Location: Giurtelecu Şimleului
- Municipality: Giurtelecu Şimleului
- State: Romania
- Interactive map of Greek-Catholic Church in Giurtelecu Șimleului
- Coordinates: 47.295833°N 22.790833°E

Architecture
- Completed: 1819
- Demolished: 1973
- Materials: Stone

The Greek-Catholic Church in Giurtelecu Șimleului was a church in Giurtelecu Şimleului, Romania, built in 1819 and demolished in 1973.

== Gallery ==
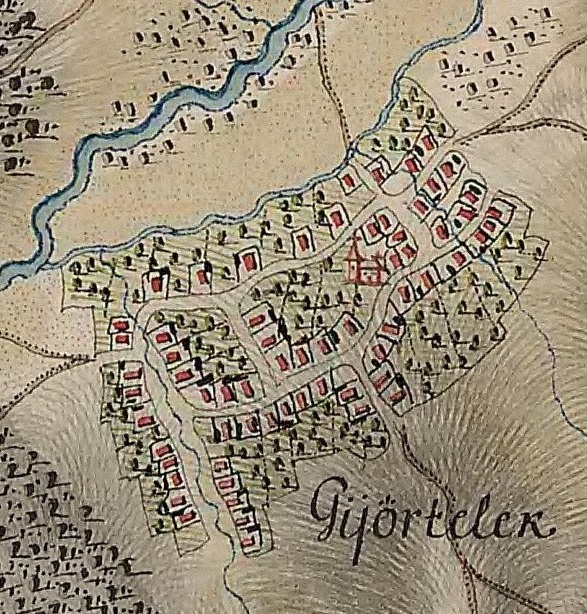
Location in Giurtelecu Șimleului
