= Alexandra Hotel, Knightsbridge =

Former hotel in Knightsbridge, London

Coordinates: 51.50232°N 0.15514°W

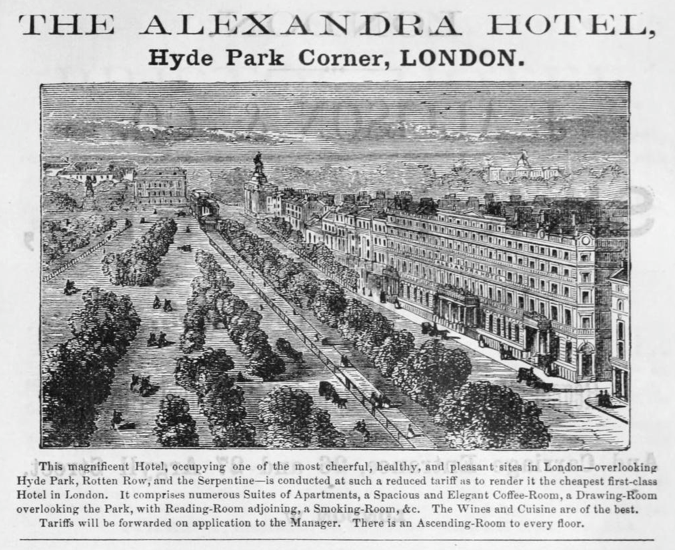
Alexandra Hotel, 1885 ad

The Alexandra Hotel was a hotel at what is now 25–27 Knightsbridge, London.

It was originally the Wallace Hotel, and opened in 1858 on the site of what had been a pub, the White Horse, and soon acquired two adjoining houses to allow expansion. It was bought in 1863 by the Alexandra Hotel Company Limited, formed specifically for that purpose, and the much-enlarged and remodelled "opulent" hotel, probably designed by the architect Francis E. H. Fowler, opened in 1864.

During the night on 11 May 1941, a large bomb went through five floors before exploding in the heart of the fully occupied hotel, killing 24 and with another 26 people seriously injured. One of those killed was Marjorie Stewart Butler, one of the crew of one of the first ambulances on the scene. Butler entered the damaged building to help casualties, but part of the building collapsed on her and she later died of her injuries.

The hotel was demolished and rebuilt as Agriculture House in 1954, and as 25 and 27 Knightsbridge in 1993–95.
