= Metropolitan Board of Works =

Principal instrument of London-wide government from 1855 until 1889

Type
- Type: Board of works
- Houses: Unicameral
- Term limits: Three years

History
- Founded: 1 January 1856
- Disbanded: March 1889
- Preceded by: Metropolitan Buildings Office; Metropolitan Commission of Sewers
- Succeeded by: London County Council, the (District of the) Metropolis being renamed the County of London

Leadership
- Chairman: John Thwaites (1855–1870); James Macnaghten Hogg (1870–1889)

Structure
- Seats: 1 chairman; 45 members (1855–1885); 59 members (1885–1889)
- Committees: Parks and Open Spaces; Works and General Purposes
- Length of term: Three years, with one third of board appointed every year

Elections
- Voting system: Indirect election

Meeting place
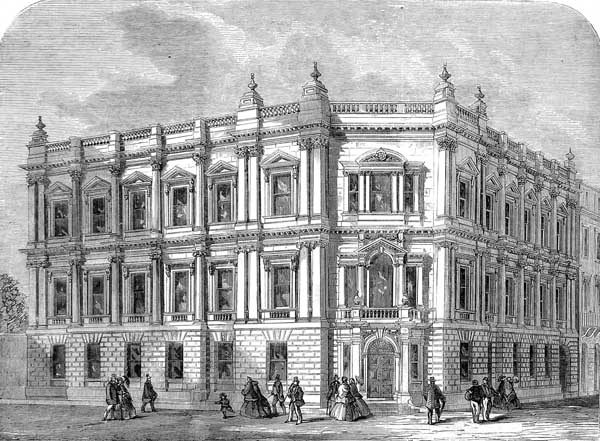
- Spring Gardens (1859–1889)

The Metropolitan Board of Works (MBW) was created in 1855 as the upper tier of local government in the area that later became Inner London, taking charge of public works. The metropolis which the board served included large parts of Middlesex, Surrey, and Kent, lying around the medieval-sized City of London and the larger City of Westminster, and also the areas to the south of the River Thames which were mostly built-up by 1855.

Plans to enact a similar body had failed in 1837, but Parliament finally passed the Metropolis Management Act 1855, which dissolved the short-lived Metropolitan Buildings Office and Metropolitan Commission of Sewers and made the new Board effective as of December of that year. The Board endured until it was succeeded by the directly elected London County Council in March 1889, created by the Local Government Act 1888.

The Board's principal responsibility was to provide infrastructure to cope with the rapid growth of the metropolis, which it accomplished with varying degrees of success. It also had a parks and open spaces committee which set aside and opened up several landmark parks.

The members of the MBW were not directly elected but were appointed by the parish vestries, which were elected by their ratepayers. It was accountable to Parliament, but not to a particular ministry to supervise its accounts. This democratic deficit vexed critics and rate-paying Londoners, especially after its budget grew and some of its members and staff engaged in embezzlement, bribery and breach of fiduciary duty (unfair contract procurement and mismanagement). However, the creation of county councils across the whole country in 1888 indicated a widespread recognition of the advantages of the economies of scale available from uniting parishes in procuring, improving and maintaining energy, street lighting, fire fighting, sanitation, and transport. This also reflected the successful creation of municipal boroughs by the Municipal Corporations Act 1835.

== Background ==
The growth of the metropolis around the commercial City of London and mostly residential Westminster was continuing apace; as the British Empire grew, so the London Docks grew in trade, the population grew sharply, and demand for housing rose, as did the building of homes. Half of the population of two of the three counties were within a few miles of the City of London. However the government of this metropolis was chaotic, with over a hundred key authorities having statutory or customary powers, and with some overlapping territory. Providing a publicly funded service or capital improvement sometimes needed the co-ordination or consent of many of these.

In 1835, elected municipal boroughs had been set up covering every major city except London. The City of London, within its mediaeval boundaries but at the heart of the sprawling metropolis, had been untouched by the Municipal Corporations Act 1835 and had resisted all moves to expand its borders to include the generally poorer districts surrounding it. This meant that justices of the peace of three counties, often key landowners, and powerful parish vestries, had authority over most of the urban metropolis: Middlesex north of the Thames and west of the Lea up to several miles from the City, parts of Surrey to the south and south-west, and parts of Kent to the south east.

In 1837, an attempt was made to set up an elected authority covering the whole of the metropolis; however, the wealthier districts of Marylebone and Westminster resisted this, as some of their own local powers and low rates would have been lost. They defeated the scheme. In 1854 the Royal Commission on the Corporation of the City of London proposed to divide an urban area around the City of London into seven boroughs, each represented on a Metropolitan Board of Works. This proposal was abandoned, but the next year the Board of Works was set up.

== Creation ==
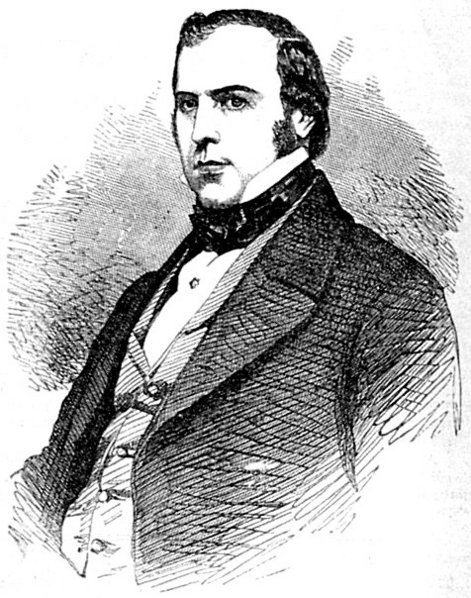
Sir John Thwaites, first chairman of the board, in 1858.

To empower this body to coordinate work to plan and build infrastructure of the metropolis, Parliament passed the Metropolis Management Act 1855 which created the Metropolitan Board of Works (which took over the responsibilities of the short-lived Metropolitan Buildings Office and Metropolitan Commission of Sewers, established in 1845 and 1848 respectively). It covered "the Metropolis", the area so designated as the London Division in the 1851 census (an enlarged variant of the Bills of mortality area fixed in 1726), the alternative proposals had been the Metropolitan Police District; the coal tax area; or that used for the Metropolitan Interments Act 1852.

The Board was not to be a directly elected body, but instead to consist of members nominated by the vestries who were the existing local authorities. The larger vestries had two members, and the City of London had three. A few vestries were for tiny parishes which co-convened into a district board for nominating members to the MBW. There were 45 members, who would then elect a Chairman who was to become a member ex officio. The first nominations took place in December 1855, and the Board held its first preliminary meeting on 22 December 1855, when John Thwaites was elected as chairman. The board formally came into being on 1 January 1856, when it took over the powers, duties and liabilities of the Commission of Sewers and the Buildings Office.

== Activities ==
=== Sewage ===
This map of the Metropolis, co-governed by the elected vestries of these parishes, shows the 1866 cholera epidemic

A major problem was sewage: most of London's waste was allowed to flow into the Thames resulting in a horrendous smell in the summer months. In 1855 and 1858 there were especially bad summers with the latter being known as "The Great Stink". A notable achievement of the Board was the creation of the core London sewerage system, including 82 miles (132 km) of main and 1,100 miles (1,800 km) of street sewers, which solved the problem. A large part of the work of the MBW was under the charge of the Chief Engineer, Joseph Bazalgette, previously engineer with the Metropolitan Commission of Sewers. William Dibdin, chief chemist for the MBW, conceived the biological treatment of sewage to oxidize the waste.

=== Streets and bridges ===
Activities included slum clearance and making new streets to relieve traffic congestion. The most important streets built were Charing Cross Road, Garrick Street, Southwark Street and Northumberland and Shaftesbury Avenues.

Metropolis Toll Bridges Act 1877
- Act of Parliament
- Parliament of the United Kingdom
- Long title: An Act to provide for throwing open for the free use of the Public certain Toll Bridges within the Metropolis.
- Citation: 40 & 41 Vict. c. xcix

Dates
- Royal assent: 12 July 1877

From 1869 the MBW bought all the private bridges across its section of the Tideway (Thames) and freed them of tolls. It also rebuilt Putney, Battersea, Waterloo and Hammersmith Bridges.

Commons-tabled plans for a bridge serving the role of Tower Bridge

The board wanted to build a new bridge east of London Bridge, discussed for many years. In 1878 Bazalgette drew up plans which were estimated at £1.25 million (equivalent to £129,000,000 in 2025). The Treasury refused to help by upping the coal and wine duties (most of the board's income). The MBW advanced its plans, but saw its private bill which included negotiated payments and similar rejected by the House of Commons for lack of headroom for light shipping.

=== Embankment ===
The Board funded the tree-studded surface in the three sections of its contractor-designer Joseph Bazalgette's Thames Embankment from 1864.

=== Fire brigade ===
From 1865 the MBW became responsible for administering the Metropolitan Fire Brigade. Architects employed by the MBW who specialised in fire stations included Robert Pearsall, responsible for Fulham Fire Station and Woolwich Fire Station.

=== Parks and open spaces ===
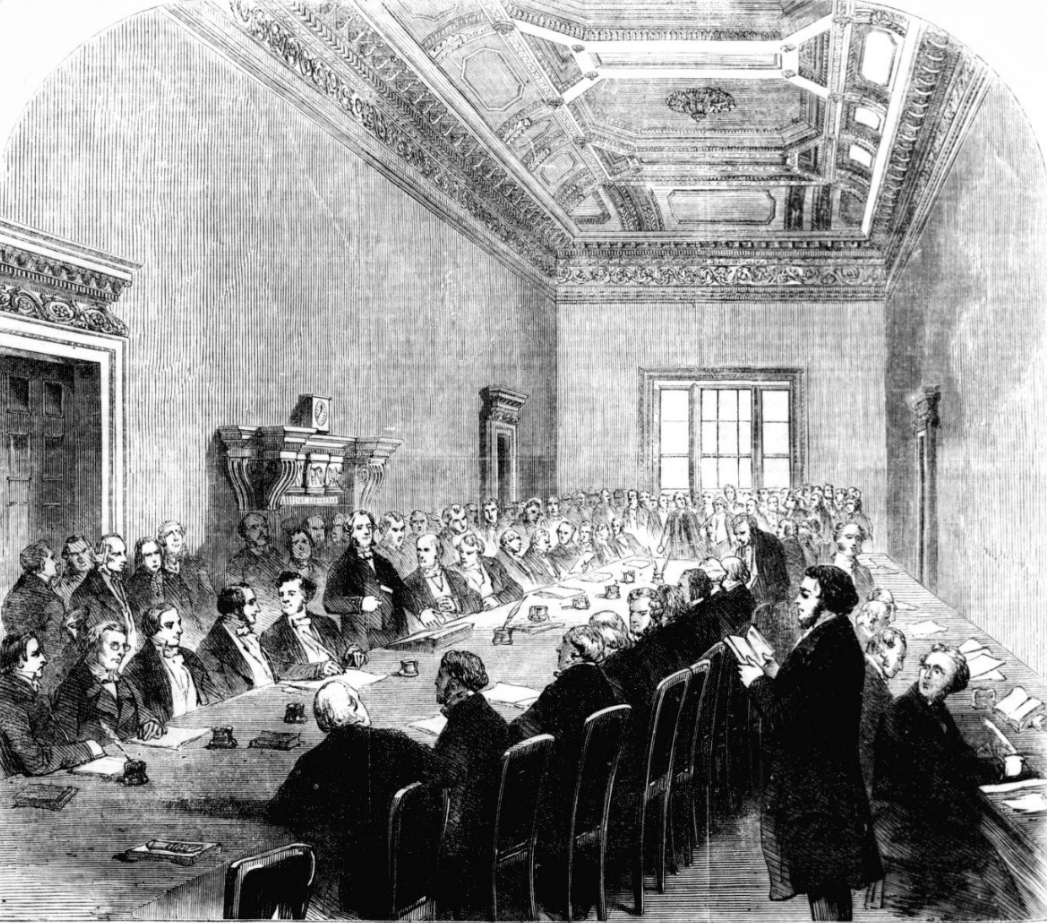
The board in Burlington House, London, 1856

In 1856 the MBW obtained an amending act of parliament giving them the power to provide "parks, pleasure-grounds and open spaces", subject to parliamentary approval. Among the parks and open spaces acquired or laid by the board were:

- Finsbury Park (acquired 1857, formally opened 1869)
- Southwark Park (acquired 1864, opened 1869)
- Victoria Embankment Gardens (opened in 1870)
- Leicester Square (opened in 1874)
- Wormwood Scrubs (vested in the MBW in 1879)
- Hampstead Heath (acquired in 1886)
- Battersea Park, Kennington Park, Victoria Park and the gardens surrounding Bethnal Green Museum (taken over from the Office of Works in 1887)
- Clapham Common (transferred to the board's ownership in 1887)
- Wandsworth Common (duties of the conservators transferred to the board in 1887)
- Ravenscourt Park in 1888 and Clissold Park in 1889
- Dulwich Park laid out by the MBW but opened by the successor London County Council in 1890.

Under the Metropolitan Commons Act 1878 the MBW obtained the right to purchase and hold saleable rights in common lands in the Metropolis, in order to preserve the right of public access. The board also purchased the manorial rights in Streatham Common and Tooting Common.

== Organisation ==
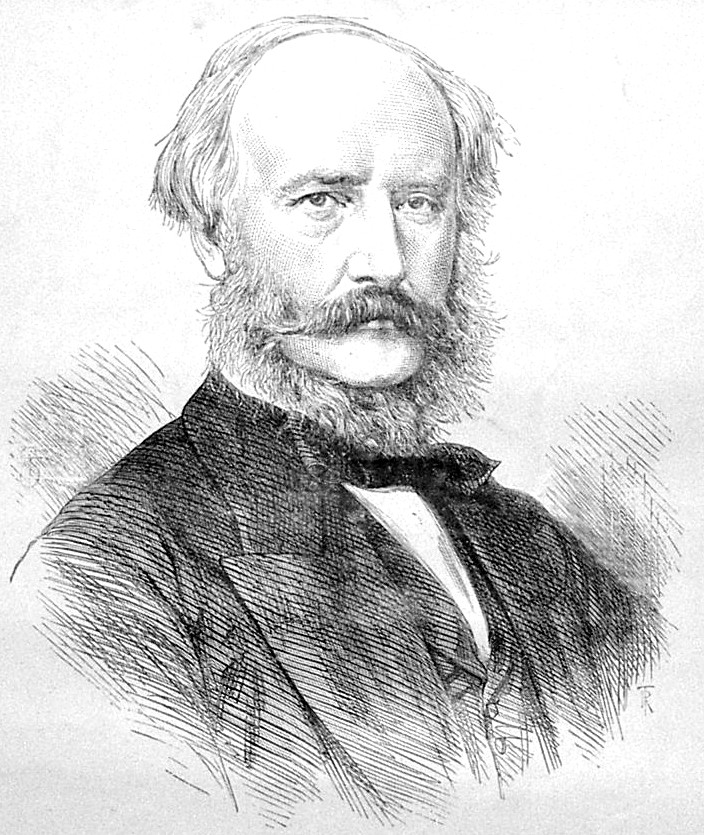
James Macnaghten Hogg in 1887.

The MBW at first had its meetings in the Guildhall of the City of London and its headquarters at Greek Street in Soho. It then built its own headquarters at Spring Gardens (which became a metonym for the MBW), designed by its first chief architect Frederick Marrable and built in an Italianate style in 1859. When John Thwaites died (8 August 1870), he was eventually replaced by James Macnaghten Hogg, later Lord Magheramorne, who remained chairman until the MBW was abolished. There was an increase in the membership to 59 in 1885 when some district boards were divided and others were given more members.

== Scandals ==
Few ratepayers and construction contractors thought MBW were transparently rewarded or that their property deals and tendering amounted to fair price and competition. Its status as a joint board insulated its members from any influence of popular opinion, though all property owners had to pay for its work as part of their local government rates. Worse, the very many building contracts issued by the MBW made membership of it desirable for anyone wishing to bid for them. The MBW took most of its decisions in secret. There were a succession of corruption scandals in the late 1880s, which led to a Royal Commission investigation. By this time, the MBW had the moniker the "Metropolitan Board of Perks".

The knub of the scandal arose from the MBW's purchase of the old Pavilion music hall in Piccadilly Circus in 1879, when the site was thought necessary for the construction of Shaftesbury Avenue. As the street was still in the early stage, the site was leased to music hall proprietor R. E. Villiers. In addition to this, Villiers paid a small sub rosa amount to F. W. Goddard, who was Chief Valuer for the Board, for favourable treatment.

In 1883 Villiers met with Goddard and Thomas James Robertson (MBW Assistant Surveyor) to ensure that the remainder of the site was granted to him for a new Pavilion. They agreed to help him, in return for one corner becoming a public house under the landlordship of W. W. Grey who was the brother of Robertson, though this was not apparent.

In November 1884 Robertson told Villiers that the time had come to make a formal offer to the MBW to rent the new site. Villiers offered £2,700 ground rent per year. The Board instructed its superintending architect, George Vulliamy, to value the site: he was old and left practically all of the work to his subordinates – Goddard and Robertson (it was said by the Deputy Chairman of the Board that "Mr. Goddard and Mr. Robertson were Mr. Vulliamy"). They prepared a report valuing the ground rent at £3,000, which Villiers immediately accepted; this was then hurriedly pushed through the Board which agreed it despite a higher offer of £4,000. Ground rent was paid £2,650 for the largest part, and £350 for the corner. Goddard continued collecting secret sums from Villiers, and Grey took up the cheap corner plot – he sold his existing public house on Tichborn Street and divided the £10,000 profit between Goddard and Robertson. In December 1886, Villiers sold the Pavilion and gave £5,000 to Goddard.

=== Subsidiary corruption ===
For years, vague hints had been made that the Board tended to encourage those applying for leases to employ members of the Board as architects. In particular, James Ebenezer Saunders had been appointed as chief architect on the Pavilion, on the Grand Hotel and Metropole Hotel on Northumberland Avenue, on land owned by the Board did little design and oversight. Francis Hayman Fowler, although he had done much other work as a board member, had taken money from site owners and lessees in circumstances which clearly indicated bribery.

At lowest level, MBW's Assistant Architect, John Hebb, had responsibility for inspecting theatres for safety. He began to write to the managers of theatres with upcoming inspections to suggest that they might want to send him free tickets. Given the power of the board to close theatres, most complied. However, displeased by the inspections themselves, and by the attempt to extract gifts, the managers tended to send Hebb tickets for seats that were at the back of the house or hidden behind a pillar.

=== Royal Commission ===
The Goddard-Robertson scandal was revealed by a series of articles in the Financial News beginning on 25 October 1886. The Board itself undertook an incompetent investigation under the Chairmanship of Magheramorne, which found Robertson was "injudicious in allowing relatives to become tenants of the Board without informing the Board" but could not find anything worthy "of more severe censure". Anti-Board campaigners were not pleased and kept up the pressure. On the motion of Lord Randolph Churchill (who represented Paddington South where anti-Board feeling was at its highest), the House of Commons voted on 16 February 1888 to establish a Royal Commission to inquire into the Board.

The commission was headed by Lord Herschell and found the main allegations of the Financial News to have been correct, and indeed understated. Some other scandals were also discovered including the corruption of architects who were members of the Board. However, the Commission repudiated the view of critics that corruption was endemic in the Board.

While the Royal Commission was still preparing its hearings, the President of the Local Government Board Charles Ritchie announced that elected County Councils were to be created throughout the United Kingdom. Without much opposition the Bill had clauses that, on passage into an Act, divorced MBW's ambit from the power-weak Quarter Sessions and other Courts of Surrey, Middlesex and Kent to turn it into a county with an elected London County Council. This matched the aims of anti-Board campaigners, principally the London Municipal Reform League.

== Abolition ==
The Metropolitan Board of Works was abolished by the Local Government Act 1888; and the London County Council had been elected on 21 January 1889, to assume its new powers on 1 April. With the MBW a lame duck, its last weeks were its most inglorious period. The LCC were due to assume financial responsibility; and the MBW began to award large pensions to the retiring officers and large salaries to those who would transfer. The MBW then decided to allow the Samaritan Hospital in Marylebone to use an additional 12 feet of pavement, which the LCC opposed. The LCC wrote to the MBW asking it not to take the decision; the MBW did not reply and gave the permission.

Finally, the MBW received the tenders for the Blackwall Tunnel and decided to take a decision to award the contract at its final meeting. The LCC again wrote asking the MBW to leave the decision to them. The Chairman of the MBW replied (18 March 1889) that it intended to continue. At this the LCC decided to appeal to the government which exercised its power to abolish the MBW and bring the LCC into existence on 21 March 1889.

The magazine Punch printed a cartoon to mark the abolition of the MBW entitled 'Peace to its Hashes', representing the MBW by a black suit of armour (i.e. blackmail). The citation lauded the MBW for showing 'how jobbery may be elevated to the level of the fine arts'.

The MBW's headquarters by Admiralty Arch off The Mall were taken over by LCC until County Hall was complete in 1922. It was renamed 'Old County Hall' and was a satellite office until the hundred-year lease expired in 1958. It became used for central government and was demolished in 1971, for a new headquarters for the British Council.

== Chairmen ==
- Sir John Thwaites 1855–1870
- James Macnaghten Hogg 1870–1889

== See also ==
- List of members of the Metropolitan Board of Works
- Melbourne and Metropolitan Board of Works, a body inspired by the MBW

== Bibliography ==
- 'Professionalism, Patronage and Public Service in Victorian London: The Staff of the Metropolitan Board of Works, 1856–1889' by Gloria Clifton (Athlone Press, London, 1992)
- 'The Government of Victorian London, 1855–1889: The Metropolitan Board of Works, the Vestries, and the City Corporation' by David Owen (Harvard University Press, Cambridge MA, 1982)

Architectural plans for the Spring Gardens building (CRES 35/2420 and CRES 35/2421) can be found at The National Archives.
