= Vartiovuori Observatory =

Coordinates: 60°26′55″N 22°16′36″E

Vartiovuori Observatory Vartiovuoren tähtitorni
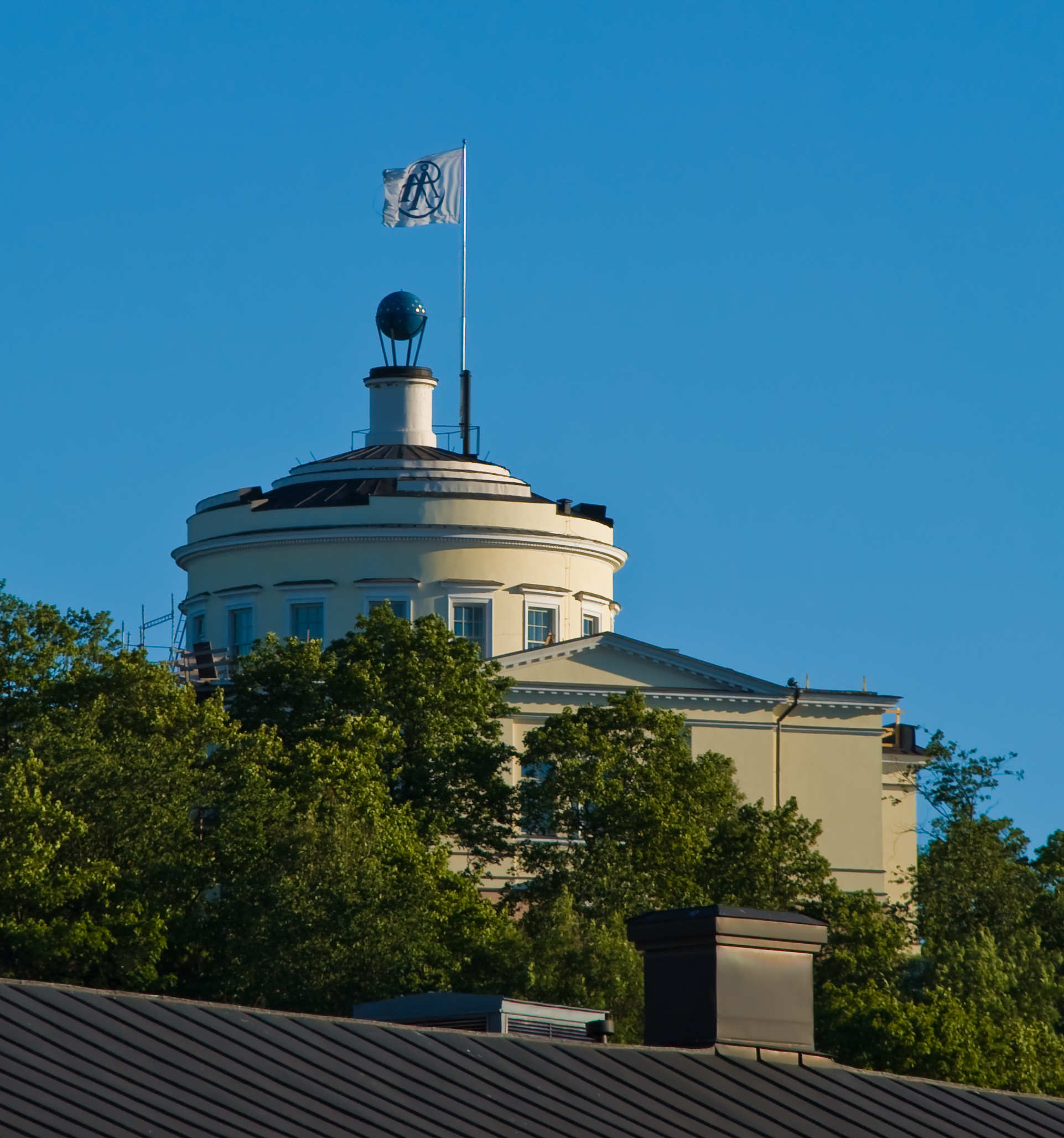
- Vartiovuori Observatory
- Interactive map of the Vartiovuori Observatory; Vartiovuoren tähtitorni area

General information
- Type: Observatory
- Architectural style: Neoclassical architecture
- Location: Turku, Finland
- Construction started: 1817
- Completed: 1819
- Owner: Åbo Akademi University Foundation

Design and construction
- Architect: Carl Ludvig Engel

Vartiovuori Observatory (Finnish: Vartiovuoren tähtitorni, Swedish: Åbo Akademis observatorium) is a former observatory in Turku, Finland. Designed by Carl Ludvig Engel, the building sits atop the Vartiovuori Hill from where it is clearly visible from different sides of the city centre.

The observatory was originally built for the Royal Academy of Turku. The neoclassical building was completed in 1819, but the observatory became defunct after the Great Fire of Turku in 1827, when the academy with its astronomical instruments was transferred to Helsinki. Today the building is owned by the Åbo Akademi University Foundation and houses the foundation's offices.

== Location ==
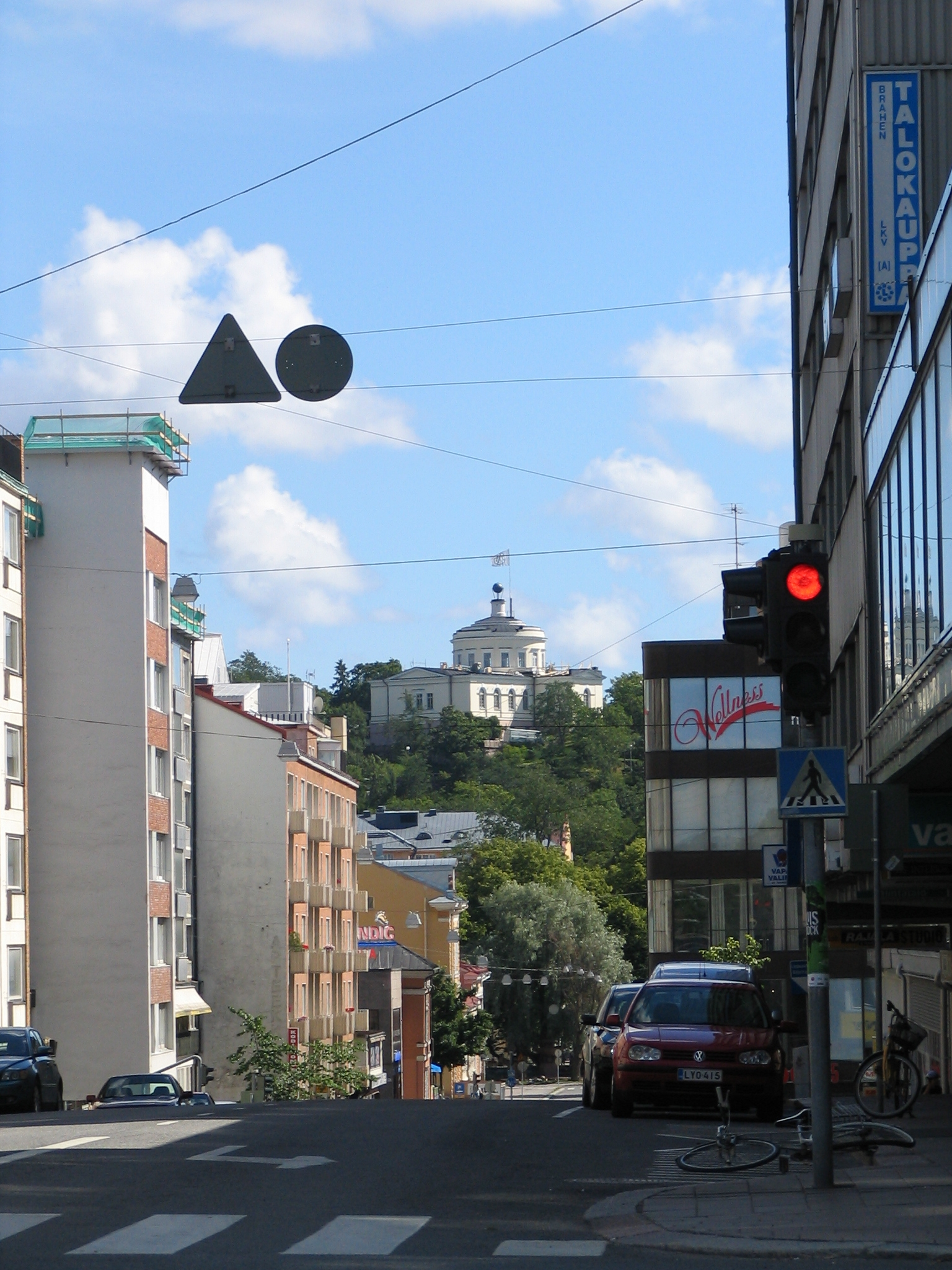
Vartiovuori Observatory seen from Brahenkatu.

The Turku skyline is dominated by the Vartiovuori Observatory, which is seated on the highest point of Vartiovuori Hill in the II District of Turku. It is surrounded by the Vartiovuori Park, one of the oldest municipal central parks in Finland. During the building of the observatory in the beginning of the nineteenth century, the hill was a barren and rocky outcrop, since it had been quarried for stone for centuries and the trees had been cut for firewood. The park was constructed in several stages beginning from the 1840s.

The Finnish Heritage Agency has designated the Vartiovuori Observatory together with the Vartiovuori Hill and the Luostarinmäki Handicrafts Museum as one of the Finnish built cultural heritage sites of national significance. Next to the observatory is located a water tank and its service building ("the Dolphin Pavilion") built in 1903. In addition to the Luostarinmäki Handicrafts Museum also the Summer Theater of Turku is located nearby. The park is surrounded by art nouveau buildings from the beginning of the twentieth century.

== History ==
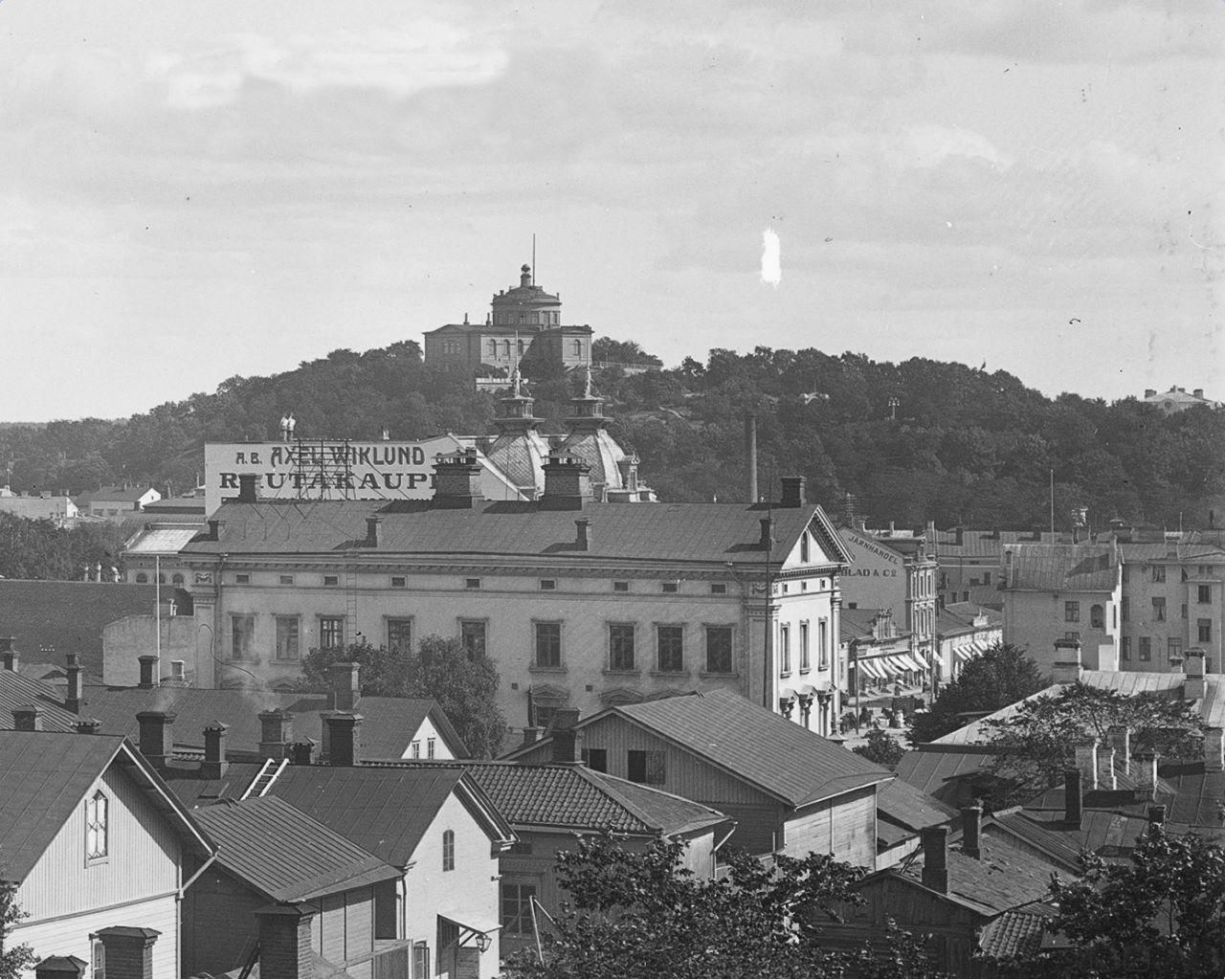
Vartiovuori observatory seen from the city centre in the early 1900s.

The planning of Finland's first observatory was started in the beginning of the nineteenth century. The recently established Grand Duchy of Finland (Finnish: Suomen suuriruhtinaskunta) had only one university at the time, the Royal Academy of Turku (Finnish: Turun akatemia). The university had considered to establish the observatory atop the Vartiovuori hill near the city centre, for which the first plans were made by the architect Charles Bassi. However, the neoclassical observatory was finally built in 1817–1819 according to the plans made by Carl Ludvig Engel. The beginning of research at the observatory was delayed for further five years, since the telescope ordered from Germany arrived only in 1824. Friedrich Wilhelm August Argelander was appointed as the head of the new observatory.

Most of the city was destroyed in the Great Fire of Turku, but the Vartiovuori observatory survived. The fire threatened to burn down also the observatory, but Argelander and the observatory's janitor managed to save the building from destruction. After the fire the Royal Academy was transferred to Helsinki, the new capital of the grand duchy. This meant that also Argelander was compelled to move to Helsinki. A new observatory built in Helsinki was completed in 1834. Astronomical research at the Vartiovuori observatory ended in 1836, since the researchers and the equipment were transferred to Helsinki.

In 1836 the Navigation School of Turku (Swedish: Navigationsskolan i Åbo) moved into the Vartiovuori observatory, in which it was housed until 1967. Only minor modifications were made to the building itself during those years, but in 1903 a water tank and service building, which is known as the Dolphin Pavilion (Finnish: Delfiinipaviljonki), were built next to it.

After the navigation school moved away, the observatory remained unused for a while. In 1974 the city board designated the building as the premises for a maritime museum and an astronomical museum. The collections of the maritime museum were transferred to the Forum Marinum in 1998. The Turku Art Museum was temporarily housed in the observatory from 1999 to 2004, when the art museum building was being renovated.

The Åbo Akademi University Foundation (Swedish: Stiftelsen för Åbo Akademi) bought the Vartiovuori observatory from the city of Turku in 2007. The conditions for the purchase included that the observatory should be regularly open for the public. The interiors of the building were then renovated as offices and exhibition spaces.

The Finnish Heritage Agency (Finnish: Museovirasto) designated the Vartiovuori observatory, the Vartiovuori hill and the nearby Luostarinmäki Handicrafts Museum as one of the built cultural heritage sites of national significance.

== Architecture ==
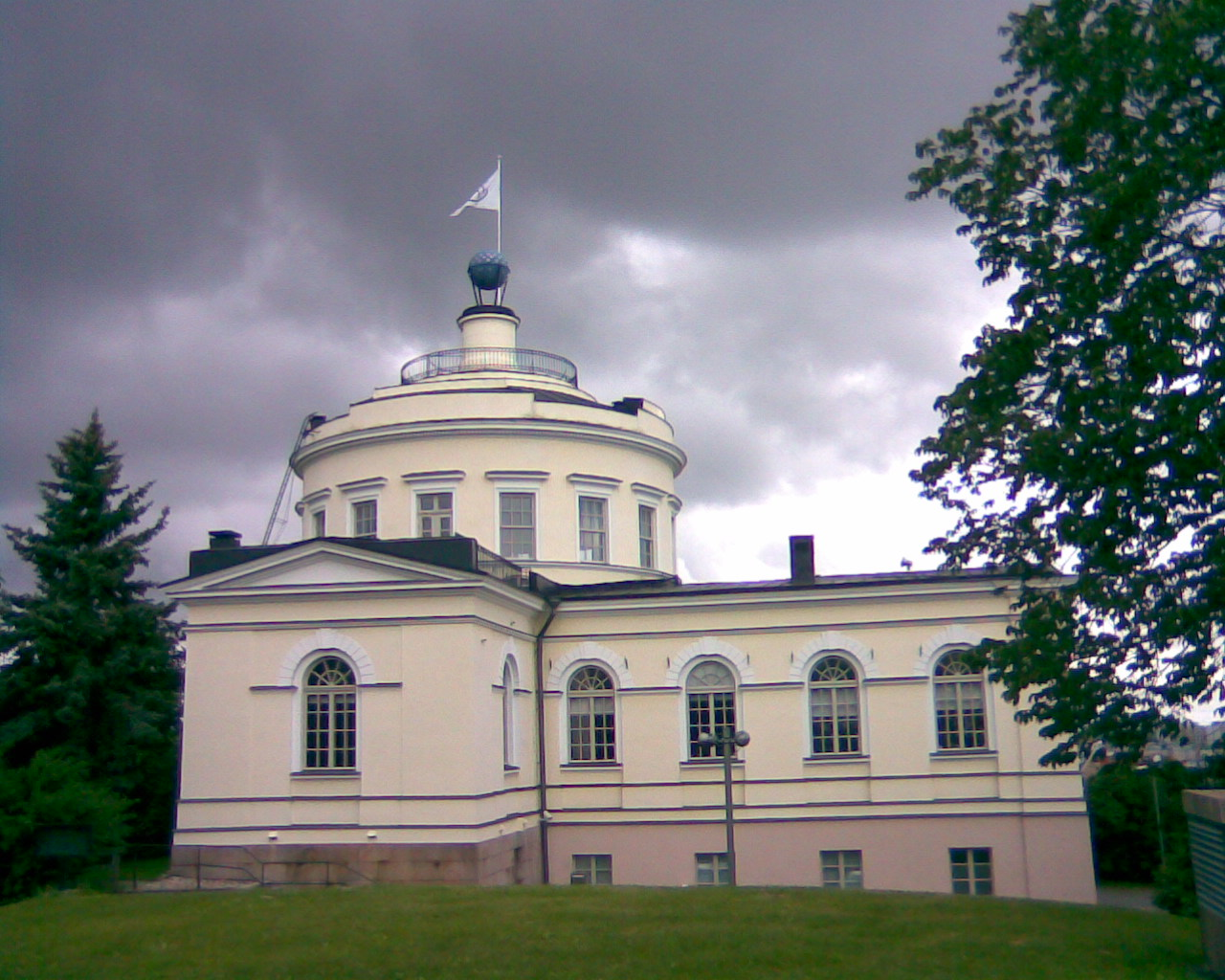
Facade of the observatory.

The Vartiovuori observatory was designed by the architect Carl Ludvig Engel, who allegedly had no clear idea of what an observatory was when he designed the building. He drew the round second floor of the observatory full of windows, through which the researchers were supposed to observe the sky. A large telescope was not included in the original drawings at all. The building served as an observatory for a relatively short period, since after the Great Fire of Turku the university and the observatory were transferred to Helsinki.

The observatory is an example of neoclassical architecture, as are most of the buildings designed by Engel. The facade is relatively simple and plain. The original purpose as a functioning observatory can be detected in the southward facing rotunda and the round observation tower on top of the building. The most ornamental interior of the building is the second floor rotunda with a vaulted ceiling.

Over the years the observatory was modified only a little. The last renovation was completed in 2008, when the building was prepared for the use of the Åbo Akademi University Foundation. One of the objectives of the renovation was to preserve the historical value of the building: for example, the old heaters (Finnish: kamiinat) were left in their place in every room.

== See also ==
- List of astronomical observatories
- Vartionvuori – Vartionvuori Park. Turku.fi.
