= James Ebenezer Saunders =

British architect (–1909)

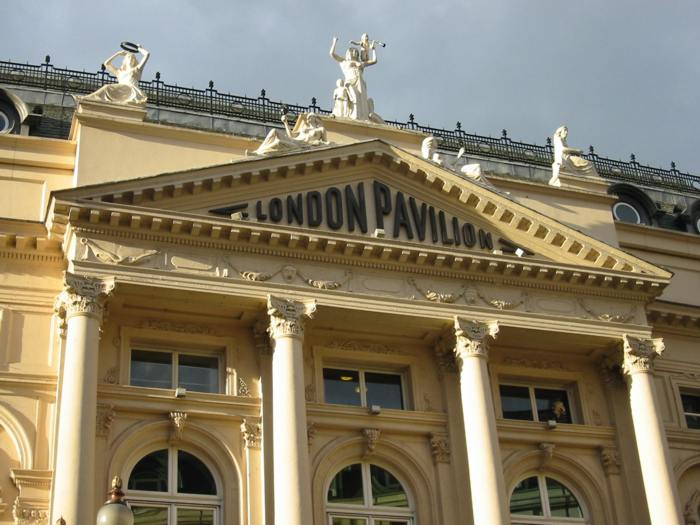
London Pavilion façade in 2002

James Ebenezer Saunders FRIBA (1829/30 – 24 November 1909) was a British architect and Liberal politician.

== Career ==
Allinson states that Robert Worley, of the architectural practice Worley & Saunders, was "involved in all kinds of speculative developments".

Robert Worley and James Ebenezer Saunders formed the architectural practice Worley & Saunders.

Worley and Saunders designed the London Pavilion (now part of the Trocadero Centre), Piccadilly Circus.

He was made a Fellow of the Royal Institute of British Architects in 1866. In 1868, he became a member of the Metropolitan Board of Works, until 1885.

Saunders twice stood as a Liberal candidate for parliament at Dartford; at the General Election 1885 and at the General Election 1886, coming second on both occasions.

== Buildings ==
His surviving buildings include:

- London Pavilion with Robert Worley (1885)

== Personal life ==
His sons Martin Luther Saunders and Herbert Stanley Saunders were also architects.
