= London Pavilion =

Series of buildings on the same site in London

- 1859 London Pavilion Music Hall
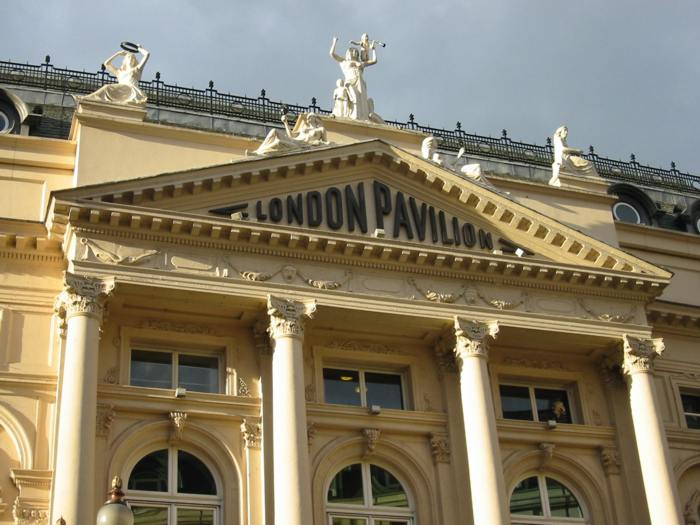
- Façade of the London Pavilion in 2002
- Interactive map of London Pavilion
- Address: Shaftesbury Avenue; Westminster, London
- Coordinates: 51.510278°N 0.133889°W
- Owner: Burford Group
- Designation: Grade II listed
- Current use: Trocadero Centre

Construction
- Opened: 1859
- Rebuilt: 1900 & 1918 Wylson & Long; 1934 converted to cinema by F Chancellor
- Years active: 1859–1934
- Architects: James Ebenezer Saunders and Robert Worley (1885)

Website
- londontrocadero.com

The London Pavilion is a building on the corner of Shaftesbury Avenue and Coventry Street on the north-east side of Piccadilly Circus in Westminster. It previously formed part of the Trocadero Centre.

== Early history ==
The first building bearing the name, a music hall formed from roofing the yard of the Black Horse Inn, was built in 1859 for Emil Loibl, and Charles Sonnhammer. A gallery was constructed for the hall but it could not utilize the full width, because one part of the premises was used by Dr. Kahn's "Delectable Museum of Anatomy".

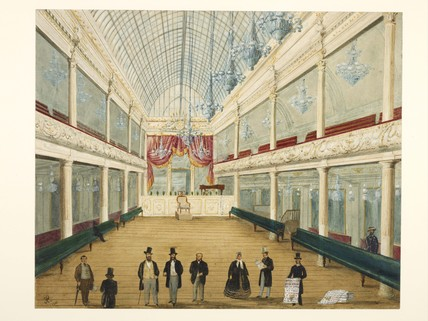
Interior of the newly opened London Pavilion Music Hall, 1861. Sonnhammer and Loibl are probably the figures in top hats at the front.

In 1885, Shaftesbury Avenue was built through part of the site, and a new London Pavilion Theatre was constructed. This opened on 30 November 1885 with a popular revue. The new theatre was the first 'music hall deluxe', with marble-topped tables for dining in the auditorium. According to Charles Stuart and A. J. Park in The Variety Stage (1895) the rebuilding signaled a new era of variety theatre:

Hitherto the halls had borne unmistakable evidence of their origins, but the last vestiges of their old connections were now thrown aside, and they emerged in all the splendour of their new-born glory. The highest efforts of the architect, the designer and the decorator were enlisted in their service, and the gaudy and tawdry music hall of the past gave way to the resplendent 'theatre of varieties' of the present day, with its classic exterior of marble and freestone, its lavishly appointed auditorium and its elegant and luxurious foyers and promenades brilliantly illuminated by myriad electric lights

== 20th century ==
The success of the venture led its owner, Villiers, to form a limited company; this became the first combine of music halls, Syndicate Halls Ltd. Lupino Lane made his London début here in 1903, as "Nipper Lane".

Between 1912 and 1936, the theatre presented a regular programme of musicals; these included Noël Coward's first success, On With the Dance in April 1925. There were appearances by Sir Harry Lauder; in October 1921, the American actor and vocalist Clifton Webb appeared here in Fun of the Fayre and again in October the following year as Phidas in Phi-Phi. In 1923, electric billboards were erected for the first time on the side of the building.

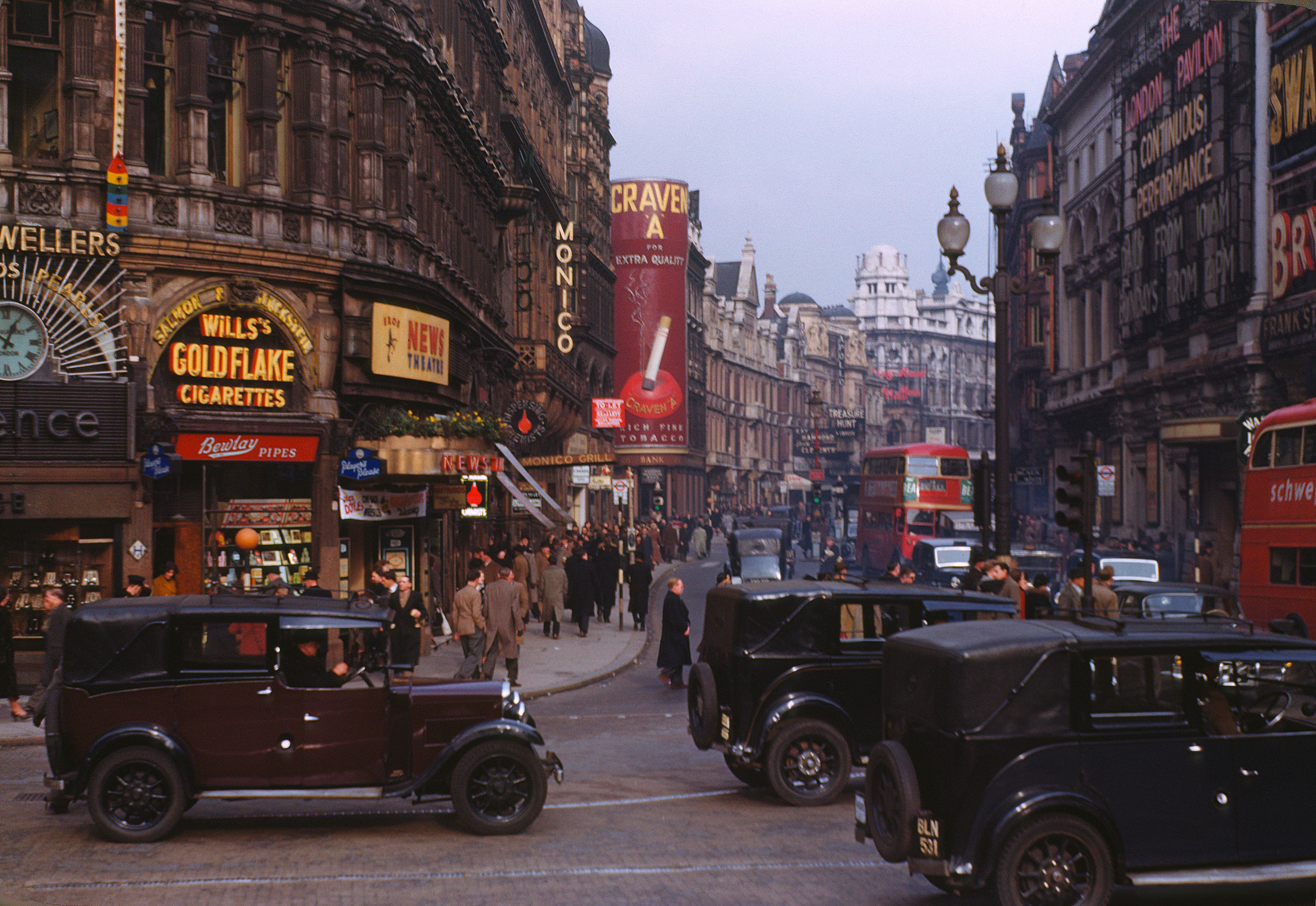
View of Shaftesbury Avenue from Piccadilly Circus with the London Pavilion on the right, c. 1949

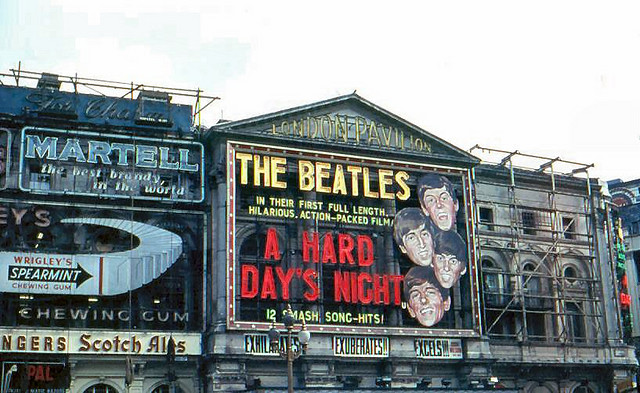
London Pavilion Theatre showing A Hard Day's Night in 1964

In 1934, the building underwent significant structural alteration, and was converted into a cinema at a cost of £70,000 by F. G. M. Chancellor, of Frank Matcham and Co. Intended as London outlet to premiere films released by United Artists, the first film to be screened at the Pavilion was the Alexander Korda release The Private Life of Don Juan which was shown from 5 September 1934; Korda had recently signed an agreement with the American company to release his films. For the première of The Curse of Frankenstein in May 1957, the foyer was revamped to look like Frankenstein's laboratory, complete with the Monster in a tank. In October 1962 it premiered Dr. No, the first James Bond film, and in July 1964 was the venue for the premiere of A Hard Day's Night. The cinema closed on 26 April 1981 and the site remained in limbo for some years.

In 1986, the interior of the building was gutted and converted into a shopping arcade, preserving only the 1885 façade and the outer walls and roof. A wax figure exhibition opened in the building that same year, run by the Madame Tussauds Group, called Rock Circus. The exhibition consisted of waxworks of rock and pop musicians. The Rock Circus exhibition closed in September 2001.

== Twenty-first century ==
In 2000, the building became part of the Trocadero Centre, and signage on the building was altered in 2003 to read London Trocadero. The basement of the building connects with Piccadilly Circus tube station and the rest of the Trocadero Centre.

The London Pavilion housed Ripley's Believe It or Not!, a visitor attraction dedicated to the weird and unusual, which was open from August 2008 until 25 September 2017. On 6 October 2018, Body Worlds London opened in the London Pavilion; the exhibition displayed more than 200 real human bodies and organ specimens preserved through the method of Plastination.

The majority of the building was later used as a hotel, which opened September 2025. The upper levels were converted into a Capsule hotel operated by Zedwell, with access of Great Windmill Street, featuring almost 1,000 windowless sleeping capsules.

== References and sources ==
Sources

- Guide to British Theatres 1750–1950, John Earl and Michael Sell pp. 123 (Theatres Trust, 2000) ISBN 0-7136-5688-3
- Who's Who in the Theatre, edited by John Parker, 10th edition revised, London, 1947, p. 1429.
