= John Thwaites (British politician) =

Sir John Thwaites (24 May 1815 – 8 August 1870) was a British politician who was the first Chairman of the Metropolitan Board of Works and therefore the first leaders of local government in London.

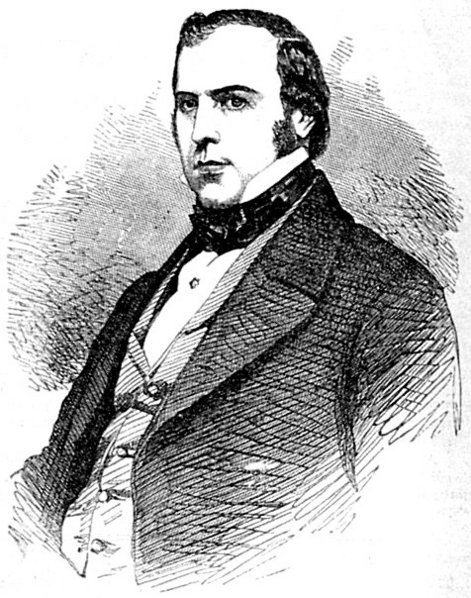
A drawing of John Thwaites in 1858.

== Background ==
Thwaites was a native of Maulds Meaburn, Westmorland where his father was a farmer. He attended a school at Reagill. As the third son, he was not expected to follow in his father's stead, and went to London in 1832 to work for Henry Bardwell, a woollen draper on Holborn Hill; in 1835, he became a partner in the business, which had a base on Oxford Street. In 1842, he left to establish his own company at 18 Blackman Street in The Borough; it later moved to 61-62 Borough High Street.

== Municipal work ==
His religion led Thwaites into municipal affairs. He was a Strict Baptist and preached at several locations including the Surrey Tabernacle (where he was Deacon for sixteen years), St Mary's Newington Butts, St Paul's Deptford and St Saviour; this led to opportunities to be a churchwarden and Guardian of the Poor. He became known for his work with the local community and was Chairman of the Guardians. Thwaites also acted to support local business: when he discovered there was a monopoly on the supply of gas in Southwark, Thwaites set up the Surrey Gas Consumers company in 1849, a mutual association of businesses, to get alternative and much cheaper supplies.

He was made a member of more than one Vestry, which handled local government for the parish, and was also delegated to the Metropolitan Commission of Sewers from Southwark. He knew the problem of sewerage (the most pressing problem in London) well enough to write a well-received and knowledgeable pamphlet about it. Politically, Thwaites supported Parliamentary Reform and the Liberal Party, especially Apsley Pellatt who was Liberal MP for Southwark. He also supported the early closing movement which campaigned to allow shopworkers more time off work.

== On the MBW ==
In 1855 the Metropolitan Board of Works was established to co-ordinate work throughout London, to be composed of delegates from the Vestries. Thwaites was selected by two different Vestries to be their delegate, and his involvement across London and on the Commission of Sewers led to his election by the Board to be their Chairman on 22 December 1855. Thwaites therefore became responsible for the wholescale construction of a sewerage system, as well as street works and other infrastructure. He was fortunate in obtaining the services of Sir Joseph Bazalgette, formerly Deputy Chief Engineer to the Commission of Sewers, as the Board's Chief Engineer.

Thwaites persuaded the Government to give responsibility for the construction of the Victoria Embankment, which was part of the new drainage, to the Metropolitan Board. A Royal Commission had recommended a special body of commissioners take responsibility. The embankment was held up by delays in the construction of the Metropolitan District Railway, and eventually Thwaites went ahead without it; the railway was put in later.

== Honours and death ==
When the main drainage was complete in 1865, Thwaites was knighted. The Victoria Embankment was finally completed and opened in July 1870, a few weeks before Thwaites' death. His illness was caused partly by overwork which contributed to his problems from diabetes, but ironically, in view of his work on building London's sewerage system, Thwaites died of cholera at his Wandsworth home. He was followed in the job of chairman by James Macnaghten Hogg MP.

As a Leader, Thwaites was respected but regarded as somewhat formal. He was nicknamed The Stiff'un by the Board's staff. He tried to keep involved in all aspects of the Board and insisted that those who were too infirm or too old should retire. He was described as having "a stony gaze and a sepulchral voice".

Political offices
Preceded by New Post	Chairman of the Metropolitan Board of Works; 1855–1870	Succeeded by James McGarel-Hogg
