= List of schools in the London Borough of Hackney =

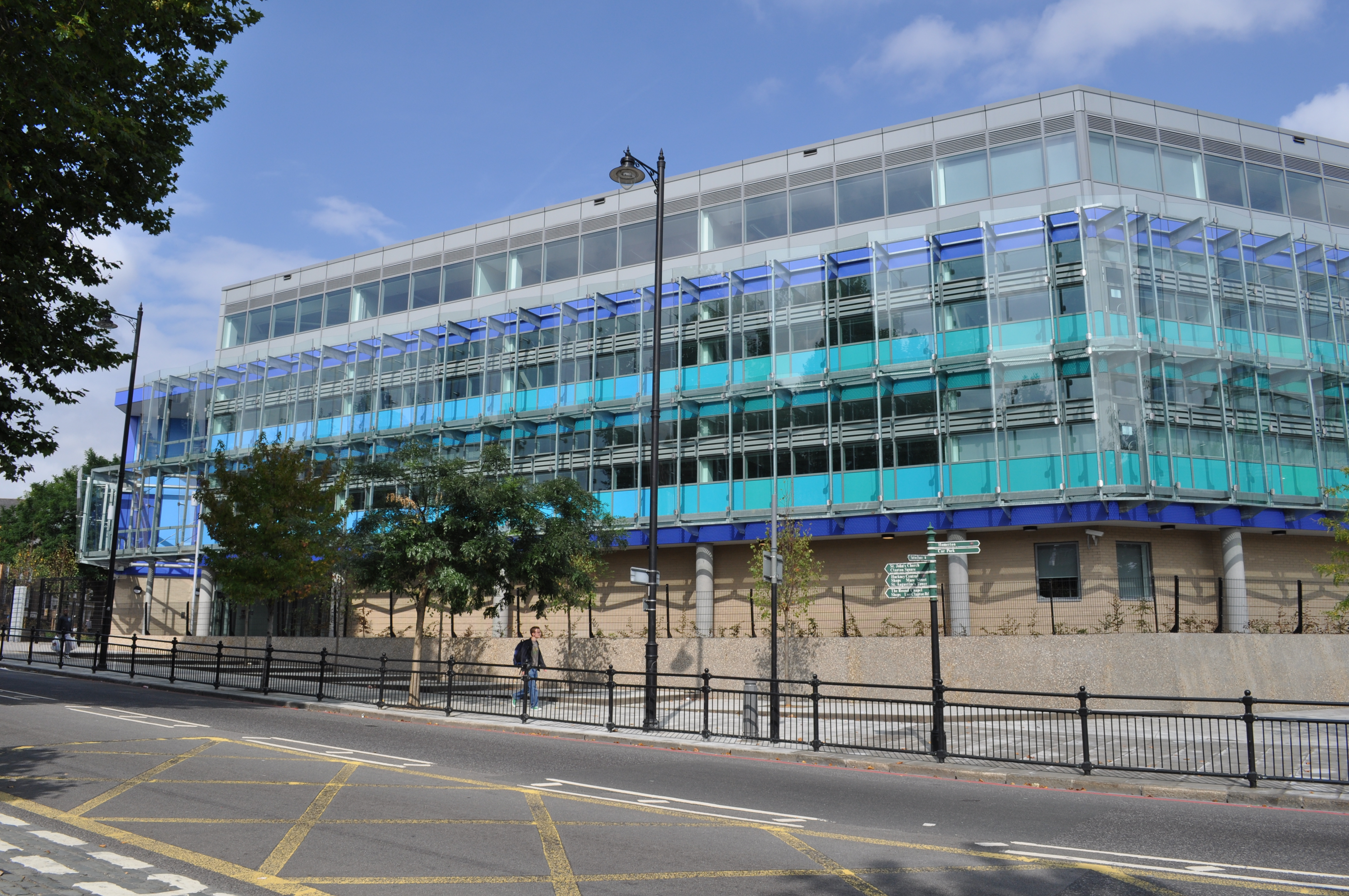
The KPMG City Academy, in Homerton opened in 2009

This is a list of schools in the London Borough of Hackney, England.

In 2002, the borough entered into a ten-year contract with the Learning Trust, an independent collaborative body that organises education for Hackney's 27,000 pupils in over 70 schools, nurseries and play centres. The trust was set up in response to an OFSTED report that identified failings in the then existing system.

== State-funded schools ==
=== Primary schools ===
- Baden-Powell Primary School
- Benthal Primary School
- Berger Primary School
- Betty Layward Primary School
- Burbage Primary School
- Colvestone Primary School
- Daubeney Primary School
- De Beauvoir Primary School
- Gainsborough Primary School
- Gayhurst Community School
- Grasmere Primary School
- Grazebrook Primary School
- Hackney New Primary School
- Halley House School
- Harrington Hill Primary School
- Holmleigh Primary School
- Holy Trinity CE Primary School
- Hoxton Garden Primary School
- Jubilee Primary School
- Kingsmead Primary School
- Lauriston School
- London Fields Primary School
- Lubavitch Girls Primary School
- Lubavitch Junior Boys
- Mandeville Primary School
- Millfields Community School
- Morningside Primary School
- Mossbourne Parkside Academy
- Mossbourne Riverside Academy
- Nightingale Primary School
- Newington Green Primary School
- Northwold Primary School
- The Olive School Hackney
- Orchard Primary School
- Our Lady and St Joseph's RC Primary School
- Parkwood Primary School
- Princess May Primary School
- Queensbridge Primary School
- Randal Cremer Primary School
- Rushmore Primary School
- St Dominic's RC Primary School
- St John and St James CE Primary School
- St John of Jerusalem CE Primary School
- St John the Baptist CE Primary School
- St Mary's CE Primary School
- St Matthias CE Primary School
- St Monica's RC Primary School
- St Paul's with St Michael's CE Primary School
- St Scholastica's RC Primary School
- Sebright School
- Shacklewell Primary School
- Shoreditch Park Primary School
- Simon Marks Jewish Primary School
- Southwold Primary School
- Springfield Community Primary School
- Thomas Fairchild Community School
- Tyssen Primary School
- Shoreditch Park Primary School (former Whitmore Primary School)
- William Patten Primary School
- Woodberry Down Community Primary School

=== Secondary schools ===
- All Saint’s RC High School
- The Bridge Academy
- Cardinal Pole RC School
- City Academy, Hackney
- City of London Academy, Shoreditch Park
- Clapton Girls' Academy
- The Excelsior Academy
- Haggerston School
- Lubavitch Senior Girls' School
- Mossbourne Community Academy
- Mossbourne Victoria Park Academy
- Skinners' Academy
- Stoke Newington School
- The Urswick School
- Waterside Academy
- Yesodey Hatorah Senior Girls' School

=== Special and alternative schools ===
- The Boxing Academy AP Free School
- The Garden School
- Ickburgh School
- New Regent's College
- Stormont House School

=== Further education ===
- BSix Sixth Form College
- Hackney College

== Independent schools ==
=== Primary and preparatory schools ===
- Al-Falah Primary School
- Beis Aharon School
- Beis Ruchel D'Satmar London
- Beis Yaakov Girls School
- Bnei Zion Community School
- Bobov Primary Boys School
- The Lyceum
- Ohr Emes
- Rosemary Works School
- Talmud Torah Chaim Meirim Wiznitz School
- Talmud Torah London
- Talmud Torah Yetev Lev
- TTD Gur School
- TTTYY School
- Vishnitz Girls School
- Wiznitz Cheder School
- Yesodey Hatorah Girls School

=== Senior and all-through schools ===
- Beis Chinuch Lebonos Girls School
- Beis Malka Girls School
- Beis Rochel d'Satmar Girls' School
- Beis Trana Girls' School
- Bnois Jerusalem Girls School
- Bnos Zion of Bobov
- Talmud Torah Machzikei Hadass School
- Tawhid Boys School
- Tayyibah Girls' School
- Yesodey Hatorah School

=== Special and alternative schools ===
- Hackney City Farm
- Leaways School
- Side By Side School
