= Stoke Newington =

Area in London, England

Coordinates: 51.56°N 0.08°W

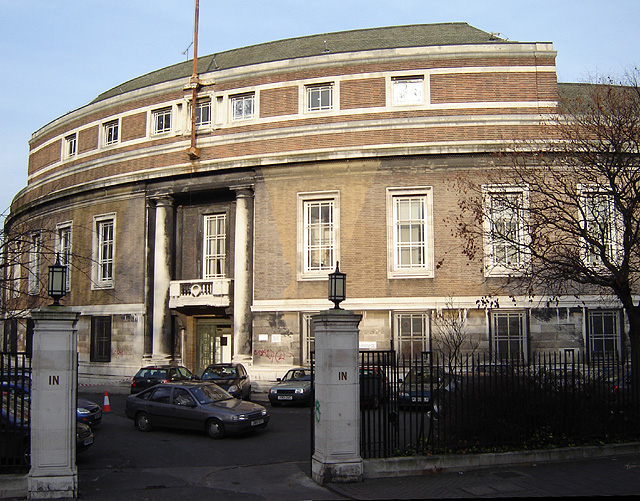
- Stoke Newington Town Hall, built 1935–37 for the Metropolitan Borough of Stoke Newington

- Location within Greater London
- OS grid reference: TQ3386
  - Charing Cross: 5 mi (8.0 km) SW
- London borough: Hackney
- Ceremonial county: Greater London
- Region: London
- Country: England
- Sovereign state: United Kingdom
- Post town: LONDON
- Postcode district: N16, N4
- Dialling code: 020
- Police: Metropolitan
- Fire: London
- Ambulance: London
- UK Parliament: Hackney North and Stoke Newington
- London Assembly: North East

Stoke Newington is an area in North London, England, located in the northwest part of the London Borough of Hackney. The area is five miles (eight kilometres) northeast of Charing Cross. The Manor of Stoke Newington gave its name to Stoke Newington, the ancient parish. Stoke Newington was part of the former county of Middlesex.

The historical core on Stoke Newington Church Street retains the distinct London village character that led Nikolaus Pevsner to write in 1953 that he found it hard to see the district as being in London at all.

== Boundaries ==
The Metropolitan Borough of Stoke Newington, which included the area of the ancient parish of Stoke Newington, as well as South Hornsey

The borough lay west of Roman Ermine Street (the modern A10). The warding arrangements preserved the boundaries of South Hornsey within the new borough. The map shows the wards of Stoke Newington Metropolitan Borough as they appeared in 1916.

The modern London Borough of Hackney was formed in 1965 by the merger of three former Metropolitan Boroughs, Hackney and the smaller authorities of Stoke Newington and Shoreditch. These Metropolitan Boroughs had existed since 1899 but their names and boundaries were very closely based on parishes dating back to the Middle Ages.

Unlike many London districts, such as nearby Stamford Hill and Dalston, Stoke Newington has longstanding fixed boundaries; but to many, the informal perception of Stoke Newington has blurred over time, to stretch east of the originally Roman A10 to overlap areas of the former Ancient Parish and subsequent Metropolitan Borough of Hackney.

=== Formal ancient limits ===
The Metropolitan Borough largely adopted the Ancient Parish's boundaries, including the eastern boundary, which followed the A10 road, though there were minor rationalisations, notably the transfer of areas of Hornsey.

Stoke Newington's northern and western boundaries have become the north-west borders of the modern London Borough. The eastern boundary was formed by the A10 road, where it goes by the name Stoke Newington High Street (originally High Street, until a name change in 1937) and Stoke Newington Road (meaning the road to the hamlet of Stoke Newington) further south.

These boundaries included the sites of the small hamlet of Stoke Newington and part of Newington Green, but excluded the open space known since the early 20th century as Stoke Newington Common (originally Cockhangar Green). Stoke Newington railway station was built close to, but just outside, this area.

=== Wider contemporary perception ===
More recently, many have come to see Stoke Newington as extending east of the A10 to overlap the AP\MB of Hackney to include West Hackney, an ill-defined area of the N16 postal area that includes Stoke Newington railway station, Rectory Road railway station and Stoke Newington Common.

As a consequence Stoke Newington, like nearby Stamford Hill, has become closely associated with the N16 postcode, though a significant part of western Stoke Newington is covered by the N4 postcode district.

== Governance and representation ==
Stoke Newington St Mary
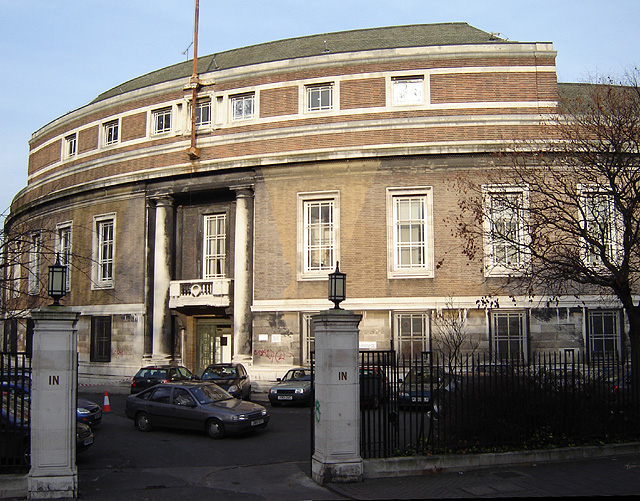
- Area
  - 1881: 638 acres (2.58 km^{2})
  - 1901: 864 acres (3.50 km^{2})
  - 1961: 865 acres (3.50 km^{2})
- Population
  - 1881: 22,781
  - 1901: 51,247
  - 1961: 52,301
- Density
  - 1881: 36/acre
  - 1901: 59/acre
  - 1961: 60/acre
- History
  - Origin: Ancient parish
  - Abolished: 1965
  - Succeeded by: Coterminous with Metropolitan Borough of Stoke Newington from 1900; Replaced by London Borough of Hackney
- Status: Civil parish
- Government: Vestry of the Parish of Stoke Newington (1894—1900)
  - HQ: 126, Church Street, Stoke Newington

Stoke Newington was an ancient parish in the county of Middlesex. It was both a civil parish, used for administrative purposes, and an ecclesiastical parish of the Church of England.

=== Civil parish ===
The vestry of the civil parish was entrusted with various administrative functions from the 17th century. In 1837 it became a part of the Poor Law Union of Hackney. In 1855 the parish was included in the area of the Metropolitan Board of Works. Together with Hackney, Stoke Newington formed the Hackney District of the Metropolis. In 1889 the district was included in the new County of London.

In 1891 as its population had increased the parish of St Mary Stoke Newington was divided into five wards (electing vestrymen): Lordship (15), Church (15), Manor (12), Clissold (9) and Palatine (9).

It was dissolved in 1894 with Hackney and Stoke Newington vestries forming separate local authorities. In 1900 the civil vestries were dissolved, and the Stoke Newington parish became the Metropolitan Borough of Stoke Newington. At the same time, Stoke Newington absorbed most of the parish and urban district of South Hornsey, which had been an exclave of Middlesex in the County of London. The civil parish and metropolitan borough were abolished in 1965 and used to form part of the London Borough of Hackney.

=== Ecclesiastical parish ===
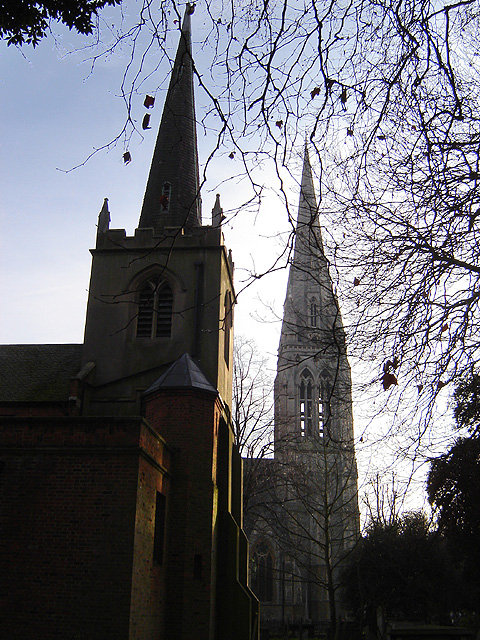
Stoke Newington's two parish churches. St Mary's Old Church (left) and New Church (right). (January 2006)

The ancient parish, dedicated to St Mary, was in the Diocese of London and was sometimes called Newington Canonicorum. Stoke Newington Church Street is one long road along which the village developed.

As the population increased the parish was divided:

- In 1849 a new parish of Stoke Newington, St Matthias was formed from part of the ancient parish and part of neighbouring Hornsey. St Matthias Church was completed in 1853 to the designs of William Butterfield, services previously being held in a local school. It was known as one of London’s foremost High Churches, as part of the impetus and money for its founding came from a rich doctor named Robert Brett, who thought that the Dissenting chapels such as Newington Green Unitarian Church were attracting so many worshippers in part because the Anglican pews were full.
- In 1873 two new parishes of Stoke Newington, All Saints and Stoke Newington, St Faith were carved out of the parishes of St Mary and St Matthias. All Saints church was in Aden Grove, replacing an earlier iron structure, in 1876. It was demolished in 1956. St Faith's church was built on Londesborough Road in 1873, badly damaged by bombing in 1944, and finally abandoned and demolished in 1949.
- In 1883 the parish of Stoke Newington, St Andrew was created from part of St Mary's parish and part of Stamford Hill. The church was built in 1884 on Bethune and Fairholt Roads.
- The final division of the parish was in 1892, when Stoke Newington, St Olave was formed from part of St Mary's, part of St Andrew's and also included parts of the parishes of Stamford Hill, Vartry Road and Hanger Lane. The church, in Woodberry Down, was completed in 1893 to the designs of Ewan Christian. The bells, font and pulpit from the City of London church of St Olave's, Jewry, demolished in 1891 were moved here.
- There was also the parish of Stoke Newington Common, created in 1886. This was outside the area of the ancient parish, being made from parts of Stamford Hill and West Hackney.

Many of the churches were severely damaged by bombs during World War II. Although both St Mary's and St Matthias were eventually restored, the extent of the damage, combined with a decrease in the population of the area, led to a number of these parishes being combined in the 20th century. For instance, in 1951 St Faith and St Matthias parishes were merged. in 1956 they were again merged with All Saints to form Stoke Newington, St Faith with St Matthias and All Saints In 1974 the name of the combined parish was shortened to Stoke Newington, St Matthias.

As of June 2006 the parishes are known by the following names:

- St Mary, Stoke Newington
- St Matthias, Stoke Newington
- St Andrew, Bethune Road
- St Olave, Woodberry Down

=== Manor ===
The manor of the parish was originally called Nentone, and later took the name Stoke Newington. The manor is co-extensive with the parish, and was the property of the Prebend of Newington, which is one of the prebends of St. Paul's Cathedral, in the gift of the Bishop of London. This right is thought to have existed back to the time of Edward the Confessor.

=== Administrative history ===
The manor (estate) of Stoke Newington was part of a huge block of land around London held by the Diocese of London. This broad area comprised many estates, stretching from the Manor of Stepney in the east (of which neighbouring Hackney was a part), to Willesden in the west and Hornsey in the north. The Manor is recorded, as Neutone, in the Domesday Book of 1086, as part of the Ossulstone hundred of the county of Middlesex. Domesday also records that the manor was held by St Paul's both before and after the Norman Conquest. Stoke Newington was a Prebendary Manor, providing an income to the work of the cathedral.

The ancient parish of Stoke Newington was established to serve the area of the manor with which it was coterminous and, like other parishes, would have had its boundaries permanently fixed by the 1180s, even if the underlying manor's boundaries changed (though manor boundaries were generally stable at that date).

From the Tudor period, parishes were obliged to take on a civil as well as ecclesiastical role, with the administration of the new Poor Relief Act 1601 (43 Eliz. 1. c. 2).

In the 17th century, the Ossulstone Hundred was subdivided, with the parish of Stoke Newington, on the west side of Stoke Newington High Street, becoming part of the new Finsbury division and the parish of Hackney to the east becoming part of the Tower division.

The ancient parishes provided a framework for both civil (administrative) and ecclesiastical (church) functions, but during the 19th century there was a divergence into distinct civil and ecclesiastical parish systems. In London the ecclesiastical parishes subdivided to better serve the needs of a growing population, while the civil parishes continued to be based on the ancient parish areas.

The Metropolis Management Act 1855 merged the civil parishes of Hackney and Stoke Newington into a new Hackney District. This proved very unpopular, especially in more affluent Stoke Newington, and after four unsuccessful attempts the two parishes regained their independence when they were separated by mutual consent under the Metropolis Management (Plumstead and Hackney) Act 1893 (56 & 57 Vict. c. 55).

The London Government Act 1899 converted the parishes into metropolitan boroughs based on the same boundaries, sometimes with mergers or minor boundary rationalisations. Stoke Newington was smaller than desired for new boroughs, and there were proposals to re-merge it with Hackney, or to detach Hackney's northern part and join it with Stoke Newington. These proposals were rejected due to the experience of "intolerable and interminable feuds" between the districts when they were previously "forced together", and because Parliament recognised that there was "great ill-feeling and mutual ill-will... between the inhabitants of the two districts".

Coat of Arms of the Metropolitan Borough of Stoke Newington – the motto means 'Look to the past and look to the future'

Stoke Newington was permitted to become an independent borough, and most of South Hornsey (also a part of the Finsbury Division was transferred to it to increase the new authority's size. Parts of South Hornsey had previously been exclaves that separated southern Stoke Newington from the rest of the area. The Finsbury Division was abolished.

Stoke Newington lost its independence in 1965, when it merged with the metropolitan boroughs of Hackney and Shoreditch to form the new London Borough of Hackney.

=== Representation ===
Stoke Newington is part of the Hackney North and Stoke Newington constituency, which has been represented by Labour MP Diane Abbott since 1987.

== History ==
=== Early ===
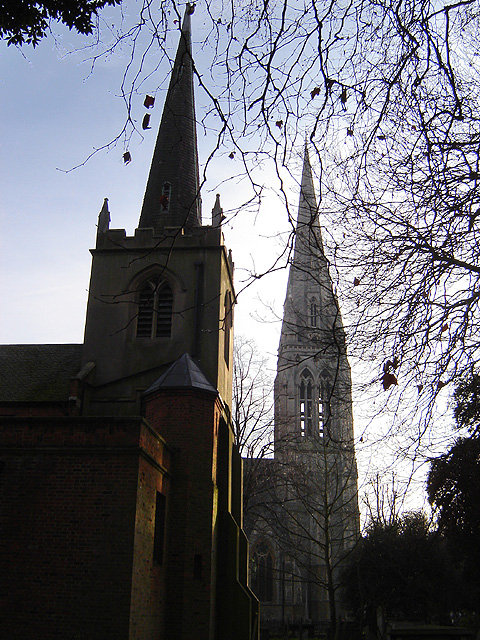
Stoke Newington retains two parish churches. St Mary's Old Church (left) and New Church (right).

Stoke Newington, or 'new town in the wood', has been lightly settled for hundreds of years, close to larger neighbouring Saxon settlements near the River Lea. In the 19th century it was discovered that Stoke Newington Common and Abney Park Cemetery had been part of a Neolithic working area for axe-making, some examples of which can be seen in the Museum of London.

In the Middle Ages and Tudor times, it was a very small village a few miles from the city of London, frequently visited by wayfarers as a stopping point before journeying north, Stoke Newington High Street being part of the Cambridge road (A10). At this date the whole manor was owned by St. Paul's Cathedral and yielded a small income, enough to support part of their work. During the 17th century the Cathedral sold the Manor to William Patten, who became the first Lord of the manor. His initials 'WP' and the motto 'ab alto' can be seen inscribed above the doorway of the old church next to Clissold Park.

=== 18th century ===
A century later, it passed to Lady Mary Abney who drew up the first detailed maps of field boundaries and began to lay out a manorial parkland behind today's fire station on Church Street, with the aid of her daughters and Dr Isaac Watts. During the course of the century, given its proximity to the city a number of Quaker and nonconformist families became settled in the area.

=== 19th century ===
During the early 19th century, as London expanded, the Manor of Stoke Newington was "enfranchised" to be sold in parcels as freehold land for building purposes. Gradually the village became absorbed into London's seamless expansion. It was no longer a separate village by the mid- to late 19th century.

Being on the outskirts at this time, many expensive and large houses were built to house London's expanding population of nouveau riche whose journey to London's commercial heart the birth of the railways and the first omnibuses made possible. The latter were introduced into central London in the 1820s by George Shillibeer after his successful trial of the world's first school bus for William Allen and Susanna Corder's novel Quaker school, Newington Academy for Girls. By the mid-19th century, Stoke Newington had "the largest concentration of Quakers in London", including many who had moved up the A10 from Gracechurch Street meeting house in the city. A meeting house was built in Park Street (now Yoakley Road) by William Alderson, who later designed Hanwell Pauper and Lunatic Asylum. The Anglican St Mary's Church, designed by Sir George Gilbert Scott in 1854–58, replaced the older parish church (also St. Mary's), which survives on the opposite side of Church Street.

St Mary's Lodge on Lordship Road, the 1843 home of architect and district surveyor John Young, is the last-surviving of several grand detached houses built in the area around that time for well-off members of the new commuter class. Gibson Gardens, an early example of quality tenement buildings erected for the housing of 'the industrious classes', was built off Stoke Newington High Street in 1880 and still stands.

As a late Victorian and Edwardian suburb, Stoke Newington prospered, and continued in relative affluence and civic pride with its own municipal government until changes brought about by the Second World War.

=== Early 20th century ===
Between 1935 and 1937, the curved brick and Portland stone Town Hall was built for the Metropolitan Borough of Stoke Newington by J. Reginald Truelove.

=== Second World War ===
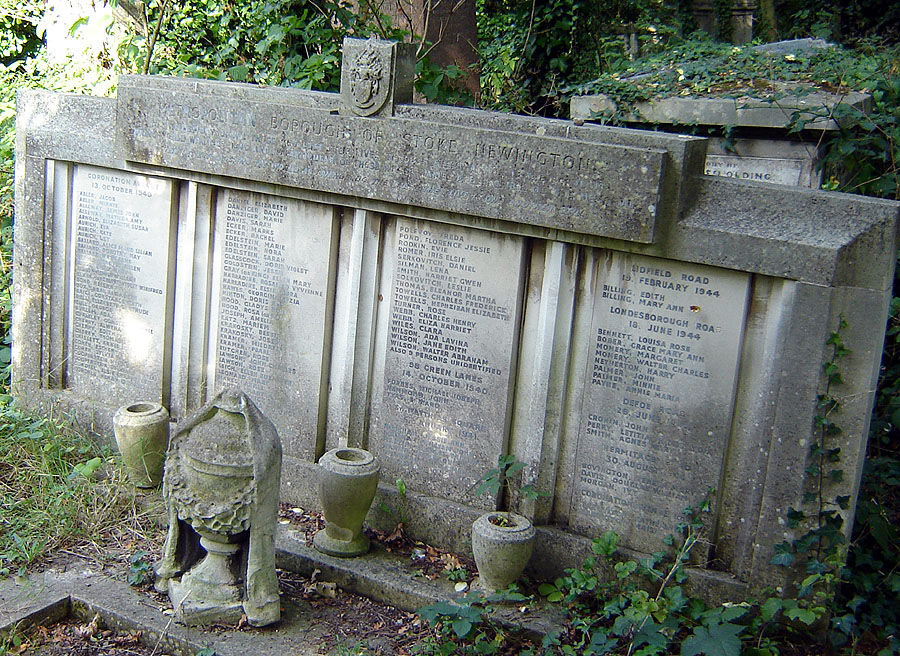
Abney Park Blitz memorial. Most of the space is taken up with the names of the victims of the 1940 Coronation Avenue incident.

During World War II, much of the area was damaged in the Blitz and many were made homeless, although the level of destruction was much lower than in areas of East London further south, such as Stepney, Shoreditch or even next-door Hackney. The death toll was also relatively low: almost three-quarters of civilian deaths were due to one incident on 13 October 1940, when a crowded shelter at Coronation Avenue off the high street received a direct hit. The memorial to all the residents of the Borough who died in the air raids, including local Jewish people, can be seen in Abney Park Cemetery. Like Hackney, Stoke Newington avoided most of the later V-weapon attacks, which fell disproportionately on South London; seven V-1s and two V-2s hit the borough.

Most of the historical buildings at the heart of Stoke Newington survived, at least in a reparable state. Two notable exceptions are the classically grand parish church of West Hackney, St James's, on Stoke Newington Road, which dated to 1824, and St Faith's, a Victorian Gothic church by William Burges. Both were so severely damaged, the former in the October 1940 bombing, and the latter by a flying bomb in 1944, that they were entirely demolished. St James's was replaced after the war by a much more modest structure, St Paul's, which is set well back from the street. Traces of the old church's stonework can still be seen facing Stoke Newington Road.

=== Postwar developments ===
During the war, much residential housing was destroyed, and in the aftermath much was demolished, being considered beyond economic repair. Postwar redevelopment has replaced many of these areas with large estates, some more successful than others. Much of this residential redevelopment was planned by Frederick Gibberd, the designer of Liverpool Metropolitan Cathedral.

=== Political radicalism and terrorism ===
Communist Party meetings were held in the Town Hall in the postwar years. From the 1970s onwards the area has experienced, or been associated with, a number of terrorist acts. The 'Stoke Newington 8' were arrested on 20 August 1971 at 359 Amhurst Road for suspected involvement in The Angry Brigade bombings.

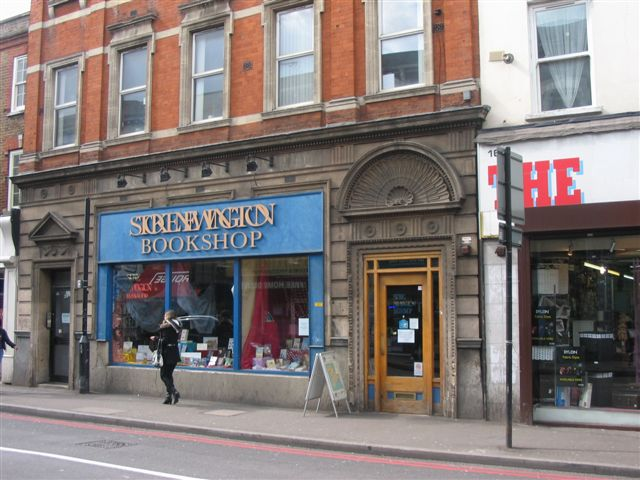
Stoke Newington Bookshop, one of the many independent retailers in Stoke Newington

Stoke Newington residents Patrick Hayes and Jan Taylor (not originally from the area) were convicted of two IRA bombings and had substantial links to lorry bombs in the 1990s. Both were arrested, firing at officers in Walford Road and later sentenced to 30 years' imprisonment.

Muktar Said Ibrahim was convicted, as the ringleader, on an indictment of conspiracy to murder. He planted a failed bomb on a 26 bus that misfired on the Hackney Road on 21 July 2005. In February 2005, police had sought Ibrahim on an arrest warrant for an outstanding public order offence. After the attack, he was seen on the run in Farleigh Road and arrested in Dalgrano Gardens. He was sentenced to life imprisonment, to serve a minimum of 40 years before being considered for release.

=== 21st century ===
In the 21st century, Stoke Newington has a multicultural character, and is home to large Asian, Irish, Turkish, Jewish and Afro-Caribbean communities, as well as growing populations of Polish and Somali diaspora.

Stoke Newington has undergone major gentrification, as have neighbouring Newington Green, Canonbury and Dalston. Church Street includes many independent shops, pubs, bars and cafes.

In 2022, traders formed the Stoke Newington Business Association and launched "See you in Stokey", a website dedicated to the area with event listings, articles, and area guides.

== Open space ==
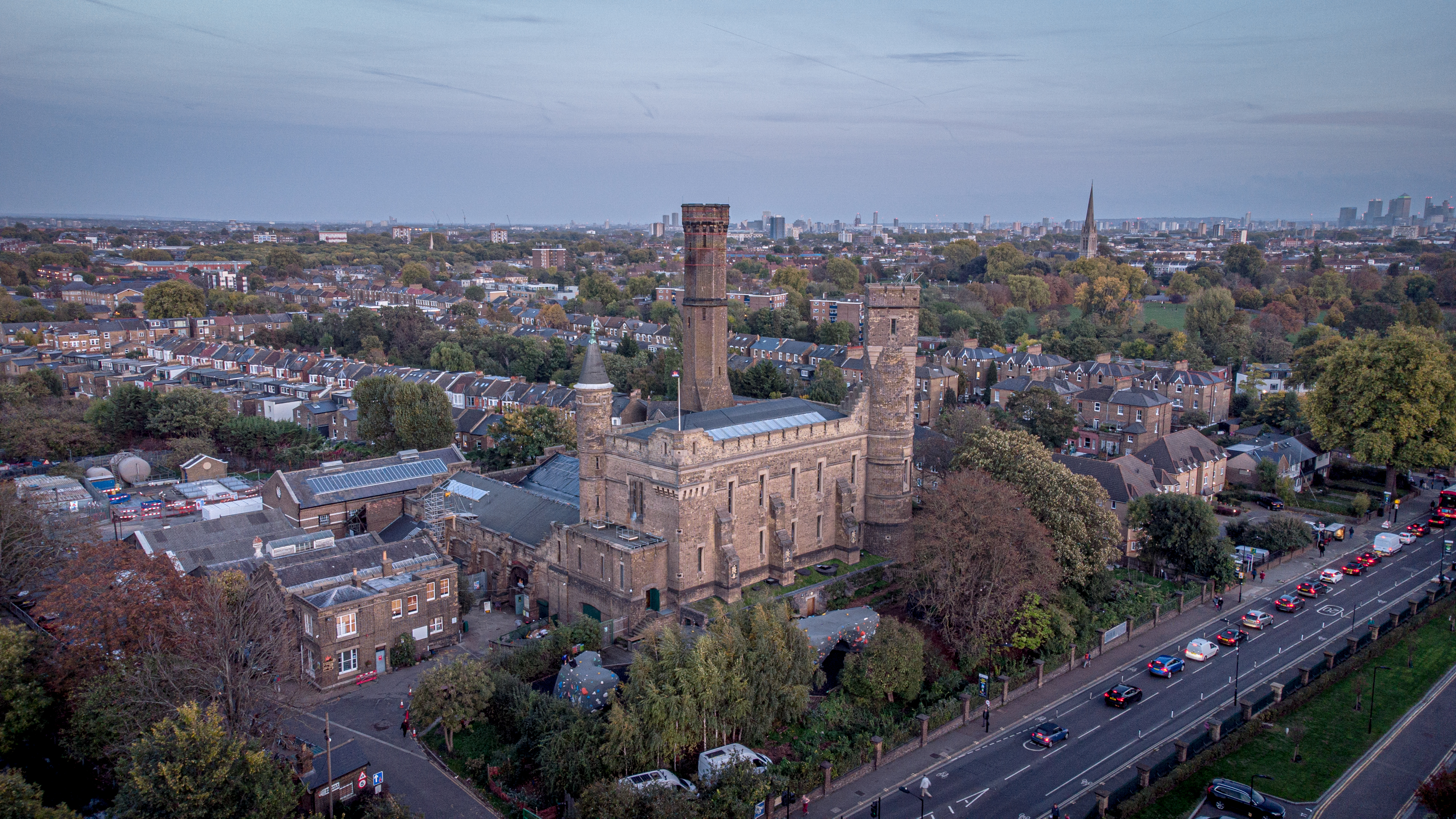
The Castle Climbing Centre

In the north of the district is the extensive West Reservoir, now a non-working facility, but open for leisure and surrounded by green space. At the entrance is the Castle Climbing Centre, once the main Water Board pumping station. William Chadwell Mylne designed it to resemble a towering Scottish castle.

To the south of these facilities is Clissold Park, which contains a small menagerie, aviary and Clissold Mansion, a Grade II listed building, built in the 1790s for Jonathan Hoare, a local Quaker and brother of Samuel Hoare.

East from Clissold Park are two Church of England parish churches, both called St Mary's (Stoke Newington chose to retain the old one), and the Victorian Abney Park Cemetery. This is the main London burial ground for 19th-century nonconformist ministers and William Booth, founder of the Salvation Army, is buried here. It is now a nature reserve. Abney Park was scheduled in 2009 as one of Britain's historical parks and gardens at risk from neglect and decay.

Across the high street to the east is the fragmented Stoke Newington Common, which has had an extensive and diverse programme of tree planting.

== Reservoirs ==
From the 16th century onwards, Stoke Newington has played a prominent role in assuring a water supply to sustain London's rapid growth. The artificial New River runs through the area and still makes a contribution to London's water. It used to terminate at the New River Head in Finsbury, but since 1946 its main flow has ended at Stoke Newington reservoirs. The river bank, the New River Path, can be walked for some distance to the north through Haringey and on to its source near Hertford.

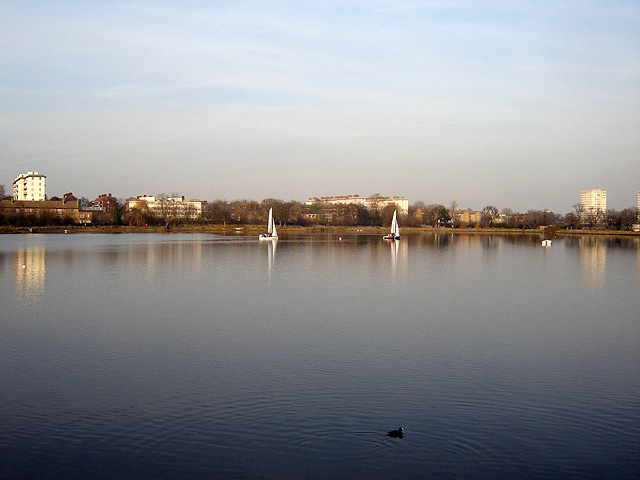
The West reservoir, looking north.

Stoke Newington East and West Reservoirs were constructed in 1833 to hold water prior to treatment in the New River Company's filter beds on the other side of Green Lanes, in the area now known as Brownswood Park. Water is now sent from here to the Lee Valley Reservoir Chain for treatment.

The West Reservoir is now a leisure facility, offering sailing, canoeing and other water sports, plus Royal Yachting Association-approved sailing courses. On its western edge stands the former filter house, now set out as a visitor centre with a café; some of the old hydraulic machinery can be viewed in the main hall. The pumping station at the reservoir gates, converted to a climbing centre in 1995 was designed in a distinctive castellated style by Robert Billings under the supervision of William Chadwell Mylne and built in 1854–1856. The site is still used as a pumping station for the Thames Water Ring Main.

Besides the water board facilities and the New River, Clissold Park contains two large ornamental lakes, a home to many water birds and a population of terrapins. These lakes—purportedly the remains of clay pits dug for the bricks used in the building of Clissold House—are all that is left to mark the course of the Hackney Brook, one of London's lost rivers, which once flowed from west to east across Stoke Newington on its way to the River Lea. In flood at this point, the brook was known to span 10 metres. The two lakes are not fed from the brook, which has disappeared into the maze of sewers under London, but from the mains supply.

== Demography ==
At the time of the 2011 census, there were 13,658 residents in Stoke Newington Central ward. Of these, 63.1% were White (44.9% British, 15.2% Other, 2.9% Irish and Gypsy or Irish Traveller, 0.1%). 16.6% was Black (7.3% Caribbean, 6.2% African, 3.1% Other) and 9.9% was Asian (4.2% Indian, 1.3% Pakistani, 1.6% Bangladeshi, 0.8% Chinese and 2% Other).

33.8% of the ward were Christian, 11.1% Muslim, 3.2% Jewish, 39% had no religion and 10% did not state their religion.

== Education ==
One of the early London School Board schools: Stoke Newington High Street 1877, now a private residence.

=== Primary schools ===
- Benthal Primary
- Betty Layward Primary
- Grasmere Primary
- Grazebrook Primary
- Holmleigh Primary
- Princess May Primary
- Jubilee Primary
- Simon Marks Jewish Primary School
- Sir Thomas Abney
- Saint Matthias Church of England Primary
- William Patten Primary
- The Avigdor Jewish Primary School

=== Secondary schools ===
- Stoke Newington School
- Our Lady's Catholic High School
- Skinners' Academy
- Tawhid Boys School
- The Avigdor Jewish Grammar School

=== Defunct schools ===
- Newington Academy for Girls, a Quaker school established 1824 by William Allen
- Fleetwood Primary School
- Palatine School, Palatine Road.
- William Wordsworth Secondary School, Wordsworth Road (but official address Palatine Road). This was the old Palatine School.
- Daniel Defoe Secondary School, Ayresome Road. William Wordsworth Secondary School merged with Daniel Defoe Secondary School in 1965 to become Clissold Park School. Both buildings were used until a new school building was built in Clissold Road. The school merged with Woodberry Down Comprehensive to become Stoke Newington School.
- Saint Mary's Church of England Primary (closed 2025).

== Architecture ==
Stoke Newington contains one Grade I listed building (St Matthias Church), and several Grade II* and Grade II buildings.

Grade I

- St Matthias Church, Wordsworth Road

Grade II*

- 187–191 Stoke Newington High Street
- 81/83 Stoke Newington Church Street
- 85/87 Stoke Newington Church Street
- St Mary's Old Church
- St Mary's New Church
- Clissold House, Clissold Park
- St Andrew's Church, Bethune Road
- The Castle Climbing Centre, Green Lanes

Grade II

- Stoke Newington Town Hall (restoration in 2010 won the Wood Awards)
- Abney Park Chapel
- Newington Green Unitarian Church
- 113 Stoke Newington Church Street, one-time residence of the poet and writer Anna Laetitia Barbauld
- Sanford Terrace

There are many Grade II listed properties on Stoke Newington Church Street, the historical heart of the district, and two other notable residential streets to the west of the district, Albion Road and Clissold Road, have many listed properties.

Close to the local pub The Lion, local resident and property owner Sofie Attrill gave consent for pop group Blur to create some publicity for their 2003 single "Crazy Beat". The album's cover and single artwork were undertaken by graffiti artist Banksy, with the single featuring a spoof image of the British royal family, replicated as a mural on the building. By 2009 it had become a tourist attraction, but Hackney Council wanted to remove all graffiti from the area and tried to contact the building owner to gain her agreement to remove the artwork. Unable to reach her due to incorrect Land Registry records, they started painting over the artwork with black paint. They were stopped after they had partly covered the mural.

== Transport and locale ==
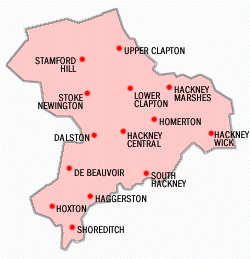
Districts within the London Borough of Hackney.

About 1 1/2 miles (2.5 kilometres) away, the nearest London Underground station is Manor House on the Piccadilly line.

- Lea Valley Lines (south to north) — from London Liverpool Street
  - Rectory Road railway station
  - Stoke Newington railway station
  - Stamford Hill railway station

It is served by bus routes 67, 73, 76, 106, 141, 149, 243, 276, 341, 393 and 476 and Night Buses N73 and N76. 149, 243 and 341 are 24-hour services.

== Entertainment ==
Stoke Newington is well known for its pubs and bars, lively music scene, including contemporary jazz, and open mic comedy sessions. The Vortex Jazz Club used to be on Church Street but has now moved to Dalston.

Since 2010, Stoke Newington has also had its own literary festival, created to celebrate the area's literary and radical history. It takes place in early June in venues across the area and was described in 2011 by Time Out magazine as 'Just like Hay-on-Wye, but in Hackney', by The Times as one of its 'Top 5 Summer of Books' and by Londonist.com as 'a literary festival that's thrown its pretensions in a skip'.

A Stoke Newington music festival began in 2015 at various venues around town in late October. The 2016 festival saw a performance by Thurston Moore of Sonic Youth at the Mascara Bar stage on 23 October and by Hank Wangford the same evening at the main stage at St Paul's Church Hall. For the 2017 festival, the main St Paul's stage was headlined from 20 to 22 October by The Cesarians, The Featherz and The Frank Chickens, respectively. In 2018 the St Paul's stage was used only on the 21st, with the Mascara Bar serving as main stage, headlined from 19 to 21 October by the Cesarians again, Dodgy and Urban Voodoo Machine frontman Paul-Ronney Angel. Mediæval Bæbes also appeared on the 19th at the Abney Public Hall.

== People associated with Stoke Newington ==
=== Historical ===
- Lady Mary Abney (1676–1750), inherited the manor and commissioned the first map-based survey.
- William Allen (1770–1843), Quaker, philanthropist, scientist, abolitionist, and pioneer of girls' education – lived most of his life in Stoke Newington.
- Anna Laetitia Barbauld (1743–1825), writer and poet, lived at 113 Stoke Newington Church Street
- Wynne Edwin Baxter (1844–1920), coroner for several of the Jack the Ripper murders of 1888, died at his home in Church Street in 1920.
- John Bransby (1784–1857), educator, minister, and headmaster of Manor House School on Church Street, which included Edgar Allan Poe among its pupils.
- Catherine Mary Buckton (1826–1904), campaigner and writer.
- Joseph Conrad (1857–1924), author of Heart of Darkness, lived in Stoke Newington.
- Susanna Corder (1787–1864), educationist and Quaker biographer
- Daniel Defoe (c. 1660–1731), writer, lived on Church Street at what is now nos. 95–103.
- Charles Fleetwood (1618–1692), Parliamentary General during the English Civil War, later Lord Deputy of Ireland and Commander-in-Chief of the armed forces lived in Stoke Newington.
- Joseph Jackson Fuller (1825–1908), Jamaican missionary to precolonial West Africa.
- Leopold George Hill (1866–1922), English medical missionary to South China
- Samuel Hoare (1751–1825), Quaker and abolitionist lived in Paradise Row, Stoke Newington.
- John Howard (1726–1790), founding father of the prison reform movement, lived in Stoke Newington.
- Rev Thomas Jackson (1812–1886), Bishop Designate of Lyttelton, New Zealand 1851 and later a popular preacher at St Mary, Stoke Newington.
- Joseph John Jefferson (1795–1882), pacifist, minister for Abney Park Chapel and cemetery.
- Joseph Jackson Lister (1786–1869), Quaker, amateur opticist and physicist, inventor of the modern microscope and the father of Joseph Lister; spent his early married life in Stoke Newington.
- Thomas Manton (1620–1677), appointed minister of St Mary's Church 1644/5; a forthright defender of Reformed principles and one of Oliver Cromwell's chaplains.
- Marguerite Merington (1857–1951), writer, was born in Stoke Newington.
- Samuel Morley MP (1809–1886), businessman, statesman, philanthropist and abolitionist—lived in Stoke Newington.
- Edgar Allan Poe (1809–1849), American writer – attended Reverend John Bransby's Manor House School on Church Street about 1818 while his Scottish-born foster parents visited the United Kingdom.
- John Scott (1757–1832), evangelical pacifist, one of the founders of the International Peace Society moved to Stoke Newington in 1826.
- James Richardson Spensley (1867–1915), doctor, Genoa CFC footballer, manager, Scout Leader and medic was born in 1867 in Stoke Newington.
- James Stephen (1758–1832), slavery abolitionist—his father moved the family home to Stoke Newington in 1774.
- Isaac Watts (1674–1748), theologian, logician and hymnwriter—lived and died at Abney House.
- Joseph Woods (1776–1864), Quaker, botanist and architect, son of a founding abolitionist by the same name.
- John Young (architect) (1797–1877), a Suffolk man who settled in the area and moved in lofty professional circles, but retained his link with the earth through highly creative brickwork.

=== 20th and 21st centuries ===
- Diane Abbott, MP for Hackney North and Stoke Newington and first black, woman MP, lived in Palatine Avenue.
- George Alagiah, Ceylonese-born British newsreader, journalist and television presenter.
- Bad Manners come from Stoke Newington. The band were formed at Woodberry Down comprehensive school in 1976.
- Richard Bebb, actor, theatre historian, music archivist—lived in St Mary's Lodge, Lordship Road, as a child.
- Mark 'Bedders' Bedford, bass player with Madness—lives in Stoke Newington.
- Ronan Bennett, writer of the TV dramas Hidden and Top Boy, born in Ireland, lives in Stoke Newington.
- Violet Berlin, television presenter and script writer for interactive/immersive experiences —lives in Stoke Newington
- Buster Bloodvessel, 1980s pop star, lived on Batley Road.
- Marc Bolan (born, Mark Feld), musician—lived at 25a Stoke Newington Common until age 15 and went to William Wordsworth Secondary School.
- Richard Boon, the former manager of Buzzcocks, lives in Stoke Newington and formerly worked at Stoke Newington Library.
- Eric Bristow, five times world professional darts champion—born in Stoke Newington and lived at 97 Milton Grove.
- Saffron Burrows, actress, grew up in Stoke Newington and attended Stoke Newington School.
- Asa Butterfield, actor, attended Stoke Newington School, lives in Islington.
- Clem Cattini, musician—born in Stoke Newington.
- Albert Chevalier, music hall actor and entertainer, died at his home 38 Woodberry Down.
- Bridget Christie, comedian, actress in The Change
- Ralph Cooperman (1927–2009), Olympic fencer born in Stoke Newington.
- Sir Horace Cutler, politician—born in the district.
- Fyfe Dangerfield, lead singer of Guillemots lives in Stoke Newington.
- John Diamond, journalist and radio presenter—born in Stoke Newington.
- Elton Dean, experimental jazz saxophonist from Bluesology lived in Stoke Newington.
- DJ Dextrous, Ivor Novello and BAFTA awards winning Producer/DJ—born in Stoke Newington.
- Rupert Evans, film and theatre actor, lives in Stoke Newington.
- Paloma Faith, singer and actress, raised in Stoke Newington.
- Caroline Flack, TV presenter, died in Stoke Newington
- Paul Foot, political activist and writer—born in Palestine, lived in Stoke Newington.
- Reginald Fox, actor, was born in Stoke Newington on 22 December.
- Jonathan Freedland, journalist and author—lives in Stoke Newington.
- Rebecca Front, actress, was born in Stoke Newington.
- Nick Grimshaw, Radio and Television personality lives in Clissold Crescent, Stoke Newington.
- Maurice Hope, professional boxer, went to William Wordsworth Secondary School, Stoke Newington.
- Gareth Jones, aka Gaz Top, TV presenter and producer—lives in Stoke Newington.
- Paul Jones, lead singer with Manfred Mann (now solo) lived at 110 Milton Grove.
- Hugh Gater Jenkins, Baron Jenkins of Putney, representative 1958–1965 of the Stoke Newington & Hackney constituency on the London County Council.
- Labrinth, singer, went to Stoke Newington School.
- Led by Donkeys founders James Sadri, Oliver Knowles, Will Rose and Ben Stewart came up with their idea in Stoke Newington.
- Stewart Lee, comedian and writer – lives in Stoke Newington.
- Michael Levy, Baron Levy, impresario and political fundraiser—born in Stoke Newington.
- Bernard Lewis, historian of Islam and the Middle East, born in Stoke Newington.
- Ken Livingstone, former Mayor of London, was the representative for Stoke Newington on the Greater London Council between 1977 and 1981.
- Zöe Lucker, actress in Holbyblue & Footballers Wives lives in Stoke Newington.
- Jean Marsh, actress and writer, was born in Stoke Newington.
- Sheila MacLeod, novelist and reviewer, and ex-Wife of singer Paul Jones, lived at 110 Milton Grove, Stoke Newington.
- Malcolm McLaren, manager of The Sex Pistols, brought up at 49 Carysfort Road, Stoke Newington.
- Warren Mitchell, actor—born in the district.
- Kevin MacNeil, Hebridean-born novelist, poet and playwright, lives in Stoke Newington.
- Rodney Marsh, footballer Queen's Park Rangers FC lived in Palatine Road, Stoke Newington as a child.
- John Matthews, footballer – joined Arsenal as a 16-year-old apprentice, lived at 51 Church Walk.
- Thurston Moore, musician—lives in Stoke Newington.
- David O'Leary, football manager and Arsenal appearance record holder—born in Stoke Newington.
- Roy Pack, footballer – Arsenal and Portsmouth, born in Stoke Newington and lived at 9 Shelley House, Shakespeare Walk, Stoke Newington.
- Professor Green, (real name Stephen Manderson), rapper, went to Stoke Newington Secondary School.
- Pauline Quirke, actress, born in Hackney, brought up at 79 Gibson Gardens, Stoke Newington.
- Andrew Ranken, drummer in The Pogues lives in Stoke Newington.
- Maverick Sabre, singer-songwriter, was born in Stoke Newington.
- Tjinder Singh, lead singer of Cornershop, lives in Stoke Newington.
- Chris Singleton, Irish singer-songwriter, lives in Stoke Newington.
- Felix Swinstead, pianist and composer, was born in Stoke Newington.
- Barbara Windsor, actress in EastEnders and the Carry On films—born in Shoreditch but grew up in Stoke Newington living in Yoakley Road and Bouverie Road.
