= Ephraim Padwa =

British Orthodox rabbi (born 1940)

Rabbi Ephraim Padwa (born 1940), or Moshe Chaim Ephraim Padawa is a senior Haredi rabbi in London. He is rabbinical head of the Stamford Hill-based Union of Orthodox Hebrew Congregations, succeeding his father Chanoch Dov Padwa, who died in August 2000. Padwa is an internationally regarded posek who was listed by The Jewish Chronicle as the 13th most influential Jew in Britain.

In 2005 Padwa was filmed by the Channel 4 TV programme Dispatches, telling an alleged abuse victim not to report his abuser to the police, citing the halachic prohibition of mesirah. Subsequently, a spokesman for Padwa doubted the credibility of the alleged victim, claiming the allegations had already been dismissed by social services as "malicious".

| Preceded by Rabbi Chanoch Dov Padwa | ABD Union of Orthodox Hebrew Congregations; 2000–date | Succeeded by incumbent |
