= Avrohom Pinter =

English rabbi (1949–2020)

Rabbi Avrohom Pinter
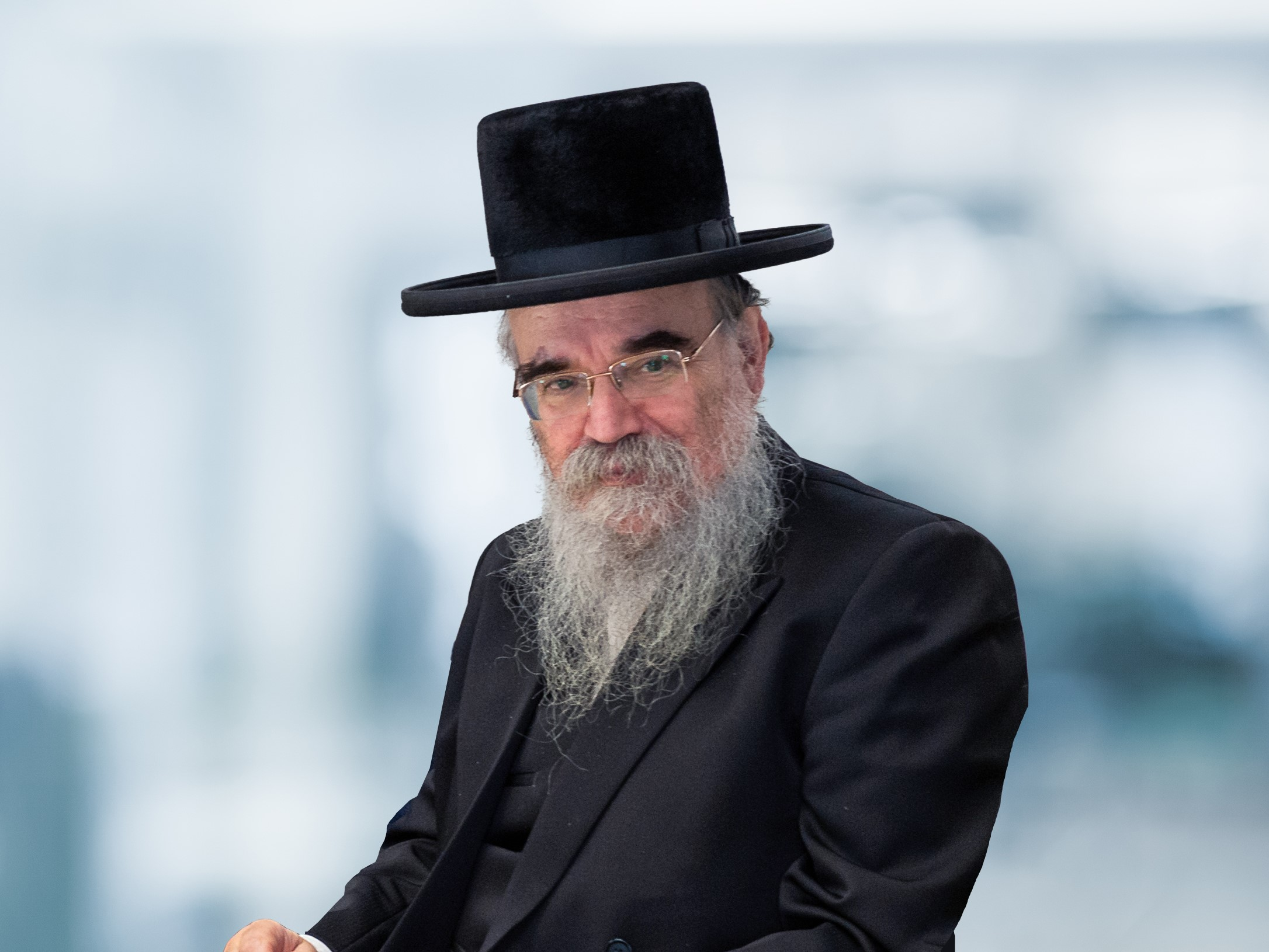

Personal life
- Born: 1949 Stamford Hill, London, England
- Died: 13 April 2020 (aged 70–71) London, England
- Spouse: Gittel Rochel Beck

Religious life
- Religion: Judaism
- Denomination: Charedi Judaism

Avrohom Pinter, also known as Abraham Pinter, Avraham Pinter or Avram Pinter, (1949 – 13 April 2020) was an English rabbi and a leading figure in the Haredi community in Stamford Hill, London. He was also a local government politician who served as a Labour councillor on the Hackney Borough Council (Northfield ward, elected 1982 and 1986). He represented Haredi interests on the London Jewish Forum. In 2014 he was ranked by The Jewish Chronicle as no. 32 on their list of influential British Jews. He was the principal of the Yesodey Hatorah Senior Girls' School, a role in which he received praise and criticism.

== Early life ==
Pinter's parents were Rabbi Shmuel (Shmelke) Pinter, who arrived in London from Vienna in 1938 as a teenager, and his wife Gittel Margulies, the daughter of the Premishlan rebbe. He was born at his parents' house in Stamford Hill in 1949 and had three brothers and two sisters.

== Antisemitism ==
In July 2018, along with 67 other rabbis, he signed an open letter to the UK Labour Party's then-leader Jeremy Corbyn making the case for the full definition of antisemitism drafted by the International Holocaust Remembrance Alliance (IHRA) to be included in the party's code of conduct.

== Family life ==
Pinter married Gittel Rochel Beck (known as Rachel); in 1971 and they had several children, two of whom became rabbis.

== Death and legacy ==
Pinter died in London from COVID-19 on 13 April 2020. According to The Independent, Pinter "gave his life to save his neighbors. When the British government ordered a lockdown to slow the spread of coronavirus, Pinter went door-to-door in northeast London to deliver the public health warning to the ultra-Orthodox Jews in his community. Within days, the 71-year-old rabbi had caught COVID-19 and died."

On his death, he was described by the Board of Deputies of British Jews as "a much loved figure across the community, building bridges between different groups of Jews, Government & wider UK society". His friend Maurice Glasman paid tribute to the fact that "Avruham Pinter, for many years, was trusted by the different Chasidic groups and represented them on the Kedassia board, in the Union of Independent Orthodox Congregations and to the outside world." The Hasidic newspaper, Hamodia, said "It is rare in the U.K. for a chassidishe rabbi to be mourned equally by schoolgirls, Rabbanim, the Bishop of London, pillars of the Anglo-Jewish community and the Mayor of London".

In January 2022 it was announced that a new organisation, the Pinter Trust, named after him and chaired by Rabbi Avroham Sugarman, is being set up to seek to improve public perceptions of Charedi Jews in the United Kingdom.
