= Chanoch Dov Padwa =

British rabbi (1908–2000)

Rabbi Chanoch Dov Padwa
- חנוך דב פדווה
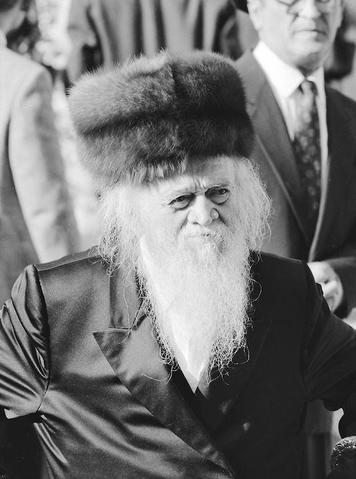
- Rabbi Chanoch Dov Padwa

Av Beit Din of the Union of Orthodox Hebrew Congregations

Personal life
- Born: 17 August 1908 Busk, Galicia (now Ukraine)
- Died: 16 August 2000 (aged 91) Israel
- Spouse: Chana Gittel (died 1946), Yehudis (married 1946), Reisel Tauber (married after 1993)
- Children: 3 sons, 2 daughters
- Parent: Eliezer Wolf
- Known for: Halachic rulings, leadership in the Union of Orthodox Hebrew Congregations
- Occupation: Posek, Talmudist, Rabbi

Religious life
- Religion: Judaism
- Denomination: Orthodox

Chanoch Dov Padwa (Hebrew: חנוך דב פדווה; 17 August 1908 – 16 August 2000) was a rabbinic leader, Orthodox Jewish posek and Talmudist.

== Early years ==
Chanoch Dov Padwa was born on 17 August 1908 (20 Av 5668 in the Hebrew calendar) in Busk, a small town in Galicia (now Ukraine). His father, Eliezer Wolf, named him after the rabbi of nearby Alesk. At five years old, he moved with his family to Vienna to escape the First World War.

From an early age, Chanoch Dov was known as an "illui" (Talmudic prodigy), studying at the yeshiva of Tzelem, Hungary and in the Belzer Shtiebel in Kraków, Poland. A lifelong Belzer Chasid, he travelled to Belz from Kraków in 1926, to participate in the funeral of the Belzer Rebbe, Rabbi Yissachar Dov Rokeach.

Besides studying in Vienna under Rabbi Chaim Pinter of Bukovsk, his primary teacher, Chanoch Dov was close to the Tchebiner Rov and the Rabbi of Teplik. With growing recognition as a highly gifted scholar, he married Chana Gittel, the daughter of Naphtoli Gottesman, secretary to the Hasidic master Rabbi Aharon of Belz (date unknown). His first employment was as the rabbi of synagogue in Vienna but he was arrested as an alien and imprisoned when Austria was annexed by Nazi Germany in the Anschluss of 1938.

Rabbi Henoch, as he became affectionately known, was released just in time to escape WWII Europe by catching the very last ship bound for the British Mandate of Palestine. Accompanied by his wife and children he arrived at the port after its departure and was forced to chase the vessel with a small craft to get on board. The potential dangers of staying in Vienna had been so acute that he was advised by the Rabbi of Altstadt that he should even desecrate the Shabbat if necessary to help him leave, as remaining in Europe would be classed as pikuach nefesh.

Rabbi Henoch's arrival in Jerusalem in August 1940 was greeted with great enthusiasm and he was nominated as pulpit rabbi of the Brod Synagogue. More importantly, his intellectual calibre was recognised when Jerusalem's Edah Charedis Beth Din appointed him dayan. This prestigious position brought him worldwide recognition and gave him religious jurisdiction over several communities in the Holy Land including the Botei Rand neighbourhood of Jerusalem where he was the designated rabbi.

In 1946 while living in Jerusalem, his wife Chana Gittel died of pneumonia. Their five children would be raised by his second wife Yehudis, granddaughter of Jerusalem Chief-Rabbi Yosef Chaim Sonnenfeld, whom he married in 23/08/1946.

== Move to England ==
In 1955, Rabbi Solomon Schonfeld, spiritual head of England's UOHC and rabbi of its Adath Yisroel synagogue, sent two rabbis to Jerusalem to select a senior rabbinical figure to head the Union's Beth Din. Rabbi Padwa was widely recommended to them by many, not least by the famed Gaon of Tchebin, as a fitting spiritual leader for London's Orthodox community.

Rabbi Padwa accepted and relocated to London, where he would serve devotedly for the next 45 years. He set to work building up key institutions such as schools, synagogues, welfare organisations and homes for the elderly. He served as a teacher, legal judge in cases that go beyond the obvious religious realm, and a role model for the young. It was under his firm leadership that London grew to become a leading centre of Haredi Judaism.

His influence was profound, felt throughout Western Europe and beyond. Despite becoming a world-renowned Halachic authority and a household name in the Jewish religious community, he lived modestly in Stamford Hill where he was consulted by rabbinical authorities and Jewish leaders from around the world.

== Halachic decisor ==
Rabbi Padwa was known for an outstanding ability to issue Halachic rulings, as well as great skill in solving complex halachic problems. Although some of his rulings were controversial and thus well known, many of his most important Halachic decisions have entered the mainstream of Jewish law and are regarded as universal. His method of applying practical and humanist thinking to the code of Halacha was revolutionary and introduced his more modern approach to many chareidi rabbis. His oft repeated rejoinder to those who questioned his perceived laxity and willingness to adapt halachic dogma to accommodate new problems and knowledge was, Lo nitna Torah lemalachei hasharet, the Torah was not given for angels [but for human beings]. This sums up part of his philosophy.

Some of his better known rulings include:

- banning television in the home; he perceived TV as a pernicious influence.
- opposing pre-nuptial agreements as a way of dealing with the aguna (chained wife) problem, claiming this undermined the fundamental principles of the Jewish marriage bond
- opposing the creation and use of a northwest London Eruv after inspecting its outline route, on political grounds (he was not opposed to the concept of an eruv per se).

Three volumes of his responsa, Cheishev Ho'ephod, containing many of Rabbi Padwa's halachic rulings, have appeared in print and function as precedents in halachic law. Another popular book on the laws of nidda, Poseach Shaar, written by his son-in-law Dayan Friedman, is credited to his authority. A very popular Sefer Halichos Chanoch entails a collection of halachic rulings, lessons and anecdotes collected by one of his closest students Rav A.Y. Schwartz of Vienna and compiled by his son Rav Zalmen Schwartz, was published in 2011.

== Death ==
Following the death of his second wife in 1993 he married his third wife Reisel Tauber, a childless widow who dedicated herself to serving a man she respected deeply. She would eventually survive him by several years. In the last two years of his life, fighting growing mental frailty, Rabbi Henoch retired from effective leadership, but kept up religious activities such as officiating at weddings and the like. He acted as sandek (ceremonial holder of the baby) at a bris one day before he died.

Rabbi Padwa died on 16 August 2000. Despite its timing and with most of the community away on vacation, his funeral in London was attended by around 2,000 people. His remains were flown to Jerusalem for burial, where a second, much larger funeral was held. The main eulogy there was delivered by Rabbi Shmuel Wosner, who noted the strong bond of friendship which had existed between himself and the deceased for seventy years, ever since they had known each other in Vienna. He stressed that great former Halachic authorities, such as Rabbi Yosef Zvi Dushinsky and the Gaon of Tchebin, had greatly admired Reb Henoch, and that he had gained much practical Halachic experience from serving under them. This, he said, greatly enhanced his abilities, and stature as a posek and precedent setter in Jewish law.

He was buried in the rabbinical section of Har HaMenuchot. He was survived by his third wife, three sons, two daughters, grandchildren and great-grandchildren.

The honorary officers of the UOHC announced the appointment of his youngest son, Rabbi Ephraim Padwa, as the new rabbinical head of the community. They hoped the Padwa name would help hold together an increasingly fractured community that could fast split up with Reb Henoch's death. Another son, Rabbi Yosef is a highly respected rabbinical authority, Rabbi Shalom Friedman, the oldest son-in-law, is a respected rabbi in the community as are many of the Padwa grandchildren.

Preceded by Post Established	ABD Union of Orthodox Hebrew Congregations; 1955–2000	Succeeded by Ephraim Padwa
