= Mark Williams (cricketer, born 1955) =

English cricketer

Personal information
- Full name: Christopher Mark Bebb Williams
- Born: 11 January 1955 (age 71); Stamford Hill, London, England
- Batting: Right-handed
- Bowling: Leg break googly

Domestic team information
- Years: Team
- 1976: Oxford University
- 1981–1986: Shropshire

Career statistics
Competition	First-class
Matches	1
Runs scored	31
Batting average	15.50
100s/50s	–/–
Top score	29
Catches/stumpings	–/–
- Source: Cricinfo, 10 July 2019

Christopher Mark Bebb Williams (born 11 January 1955) is an English former first-class cricketer.

Williams was born at Stamford Hill in January 1955. While studying at the University of Cambridge, he made a single appearance in first-class cricket for Cambridge University against Warwickshire at Fenner's in 1976. Batting twice in the match, he was dismissed in the Cambridge first-innings for 2 runs by Stephen Perryman, while in their second-innings he was dismissed by Peter Lewington for 29 runs. In addition to playing first-class cricket, Williams also played minor counties cricket for Shropshire in 1981 and 1982, making three appearances in the Minor Counties Championship, before returning to make a single appearance for Shropshire in the 1986 MCCA Knockout Trophy. After graduating from Cambridge, he became a schoolteacher.
