= Castle Climbing Centre =

Climbing centre in Stoke Newington, London

Coordinates: 51.5653°N 0.0925°W

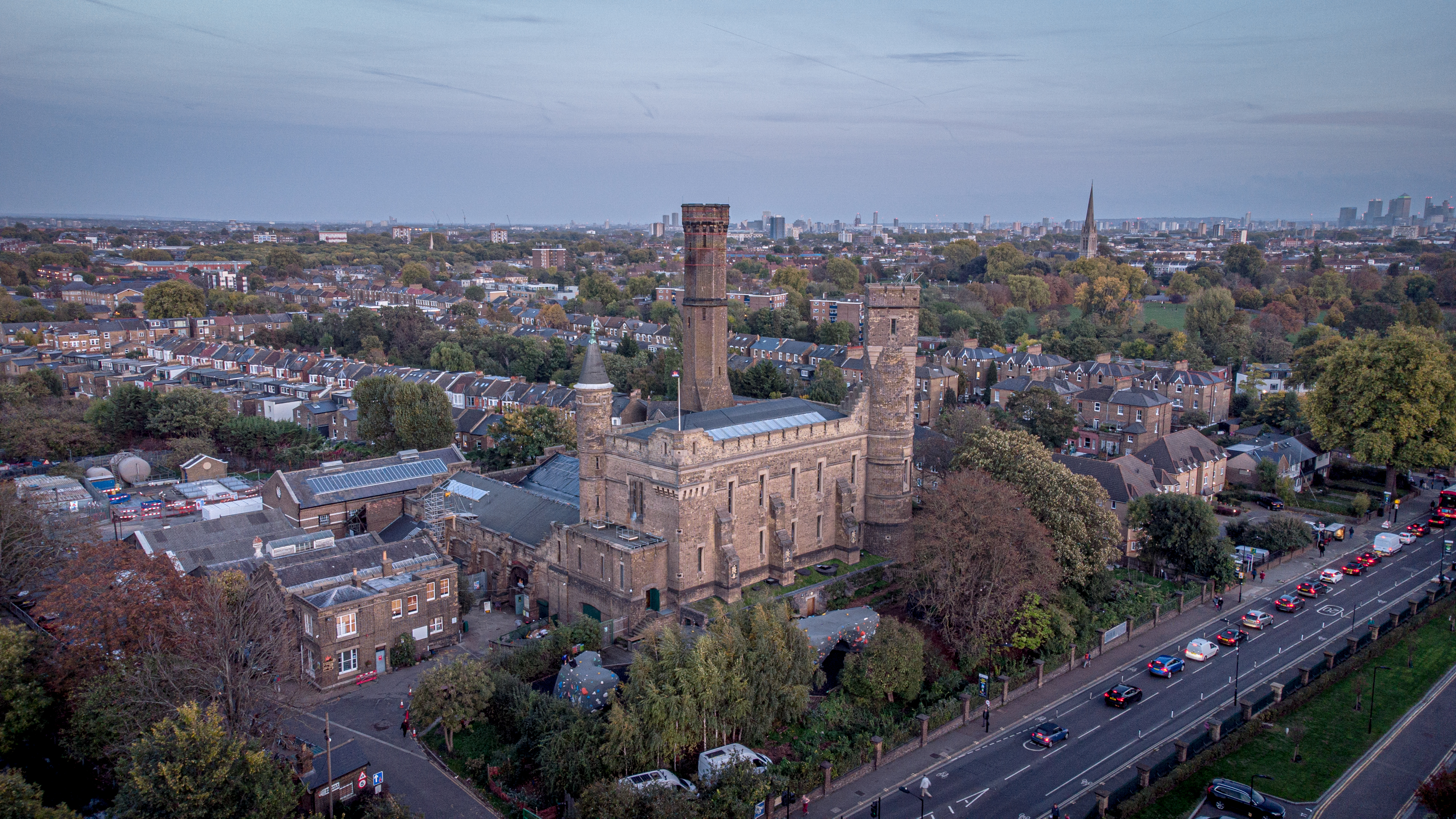
The Castle Climbing Centre; looking east-southeast

Castle Climbing Centre is a public indoor climbing sports facility in Stoke Newington, Hackney, London. It is built inside a disused Grade II* listed Victorian pumping station known variously as Stoke Newington Pumping Station, and also the 'New River Pumping Station', or the 'Engine House of the Metropolitan Water Board', but more commonly known locally as 'The Castle'. The climbing centre opened on 20 October 1995, and is now one of the largest climbing centres in London. It is a member of the Association of British Climbing Walls and a BMC Associate Wall Member.

== Pumping station ==
Following the 1849 cholera outbreak in London, the Metropolis Water Act 1852 sought to regulate the water quality, treatment and transportation in London. This prohibited the extraction of domestic water from the River Thames below Teddington Lock and enforced stricter standards for water filtration and transportation under pressure. This forced the New River Company to improve the quality of water sourced from the west and east reservoirs in Stoke Newington built between 1829 and 1833. The act required the use of filtering beds and the resultant construction of a pumping station to maintain water pressure. Architect Robert William Billings alongside the surveying officer for the New River Company, engineer William Chadwell Mylne, designed the building which was constructed between 1854 and 1856 at a cost of £81,500 (equivalent to £14.2 million in 2026).

The building housed the pumping station, sourcing water from the southwest of the two reservoirs via filtering beds. Under the Metropolis Water Act 1902, the New River Company was superseded by the Metropolitan Water Board, which in 1936 replaced the original steam-powered machines with electrical pumps and diesel engines. By 1942, it was found that the pumping station was too small to keep up with more modern demands and the architecture did not allow for the station to be expanded, leading to its decommissioning. This in turn prompted the Metropolitan Water Board to apply for permission to demolish the building in 1971. This action met sizeable public disapproval with the building then being given Grade II* listed status on 16 May 1972, however, the building was still left empty and under threat with the filter beds removed circa 1990.

== Architecture ==
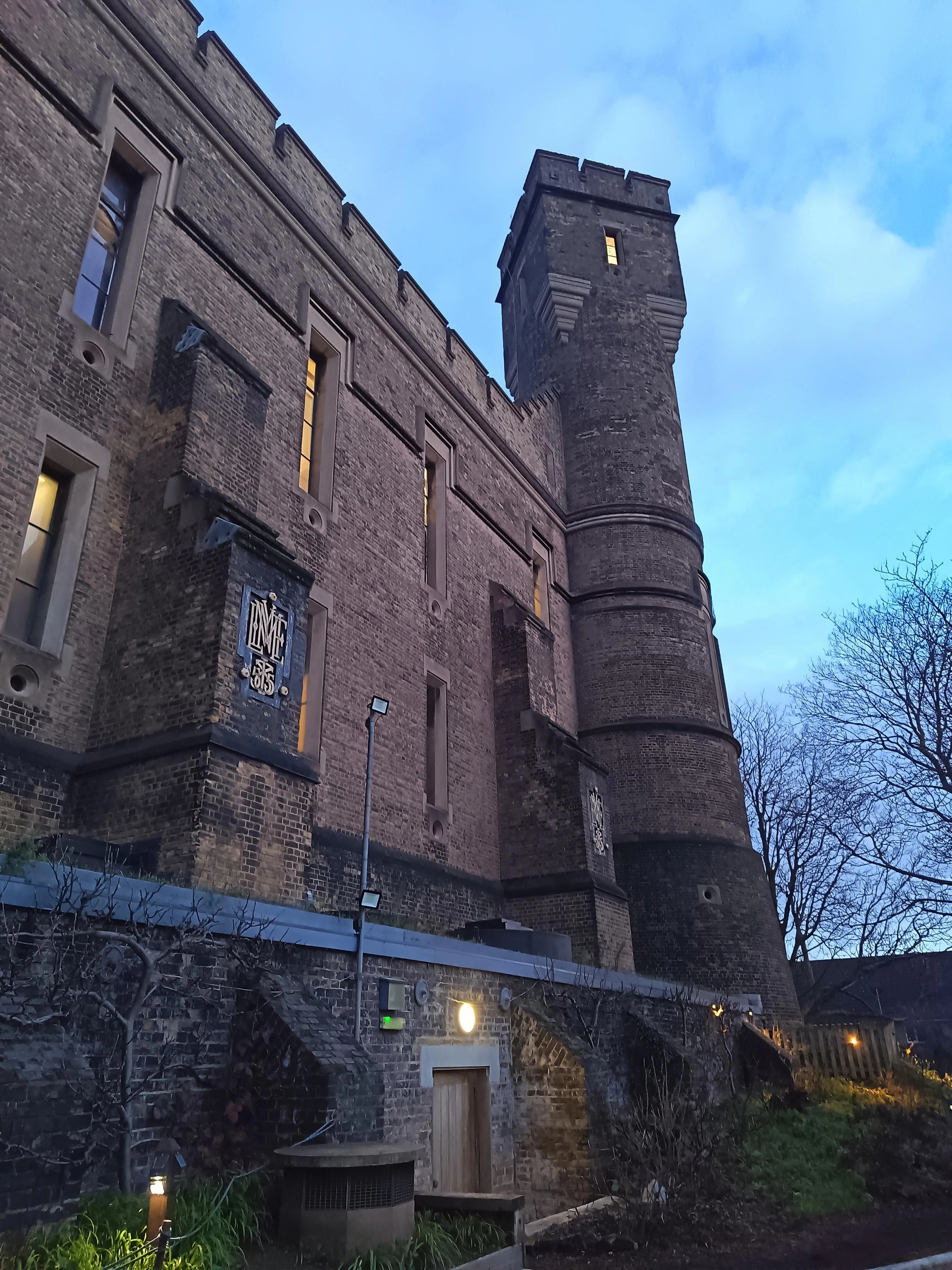
The Western facade; looking southeast

The pumping station building was designed for construction in 1854 by architect Robert William Billings in the Scottish Baronial style. It is believed that the design for the structure could have been inspired by Stirling Castle, or HM Prison Holloway as a response to the public disapproval of a large industrial-looking building. The building was constructed on top of a contrived mound to imitate the appearance of a motte-and-bailey castle with a stock brick English bond and stone quoins. Battlements and stepped buttresses surround the whole building.

The structure is split into a boiler house and the engine room. The engine room resembles the form of a keep and appears on the southwest side of the building with two storeys atop a tall plinth creating space for a large lower basement (now housing the wells area for roped climbing). The buttresses on the southwest façade are false; they are hollow to contain the flywheels for the engine room. The family name 'Mylne' of William Chadwell is adorned in gold-painted metal lettering along with the year 1855 on these buttresses.

Four different bartizans and towers surround the engine room; battlements encompass the southern towers. The northeast corner is contained by a round tower with a conical roof. The southwest corner is contained by a round tower finishing with a square superstructure supported by stepped corbels. On the northwest corner there lies a square bartizan extending to the base. The tallest tower is on the southeast side with a steadily narrowing octagonal cross-section.

== Climbing centre ==
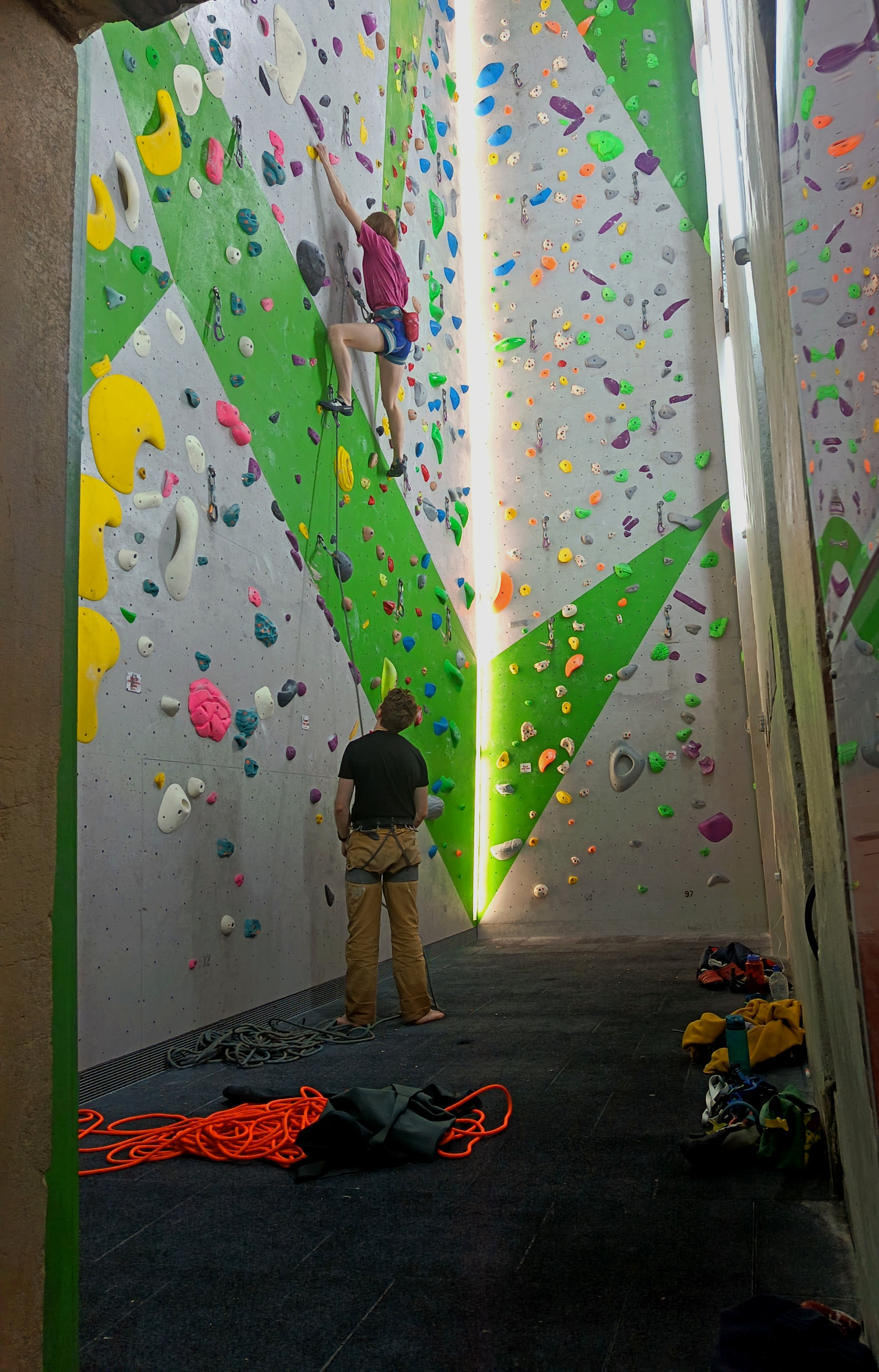
A party lead climbing in Well 1; where the old flywheels used to be

On 26 July 1993, the limited company which now runs the climbing centre was incorporated as Turnchain Projects Limited which was later changed to High Performance Sports Limited on 14 December 1993. By 1993, Thames Water had inherited the pumping station. Having no use for it, contributed it to Steve Taylor and two other founders looking to build a climbing centre; the fourth in London at the time.

In May 1994, planning permission was received to convert the building into the Castle Climbing School along with approval from English Heritage under the condition that the external appearance of the building was maintained and any removed internal elements were conserved. The design scheme was devised by architects Nicholas Grimshaw and Partners and the climbing centre was first opened on 20 October 1995; initially only in the engine room of the pumping station. Since opening, the centre has been subject to constant development in increasing the quality and number of climbing surfaces provided including expansion into the boiler house in 2000. Three outdoor boulders were constructed in 2013 which were later refurbished in 2019.

The 1.4-acre Castle Climbing Centre Community Garden was founded in 2009 and surrounds the southern sides of the building; run by volunteers, it provides vegetables, fruits and herbs for use in the centre cafe; in restaurants and as donations.

The centre usually houses approximately 450 boulder problems spanning 14 indoor and 3 outdoor boulders; these are usually graded between V0 (4) and V9 (7C). Additionally, over 100 roped lines that facilitate approximately 350 routes within 13 dedicated areas for leading, top-roping and auto-belays; these are usually graded between 4 and 8a (5.13b). In addition, the centre provides a gym; a warm-up area and a training area.
