= Union of Orthodox Hebrew Congregations =

Organisation of Jewish communities in London

The Union of Orthodox Hebrew Congregations is an umbrella organisation of Haredi Jewish communities in London, and has an estimated membership of over 6,000. It was founded in 1926, with the stated mission "to protect traditional Judaism", and has an affiliation of over a hundred synagogues and educational institutions. It caters for all aspects of Haredi Jewish life in London, and operates mainly in the suburbs of Stamford Hill, Golders Green, Hendon, and Edgware.

== Activities ==
- The Kedassia kashruth organisation
- UOHC is responsible for the management of the Beis Brucha Mother & Baby Home, which provides short-term care for mothers and new-born babies after childbirth.
- North London Chevra Kadisha
- North West London Chevra Kadisha
- Beth Din for litigation in Stamford Hill and Golders Green
- Beis Horo'o (advice centre for questions of Jewish Law)

== Rabbinate ==
The spiritual leadership of UOHC is in the hands of its rabbinate, led by the Av Beis Din. Its first head was Rabbi Avigdor Schonfeld. He was succeeded by his son, Solomon Schonfeld, who also founded the Jewish Secondary School Movement.

From 1955 to 2000, the Av Beis Din was the posek, Rabbi Chanoch Dov Padwa.

== Lay management ==
The lay management is its executive committee, elected triennially by the UOHC, whose members are appointed by the constituent synagogues.

== Controversies ==
=== Neturei Karta funding controversy ===
In July 2006, The Jewish Chronicle wrote that the UOHC's accounts appeared to show it had given a London-based charity associated with Neturei Karta more than £58,000 in grants. This prompted some members of the Hendon Adath Yisroel Synagogue to review its affiliation with the UOHC. The synagogue resolved to remain affiliated.

=== Sexual abuse scandal ===
In October 2012, a blog post appeared on the blog If You Tickle Us which suggested that Chaim Halpern, rabbi of a UOHC synagogue and a member of the UOHC rabbinate, was accused of inappropriate sexual conduct. It later became clear that the accusation was of sexual impropriety with around thirty women that came to him for counselling. A group of London rabbis and religious judges issued a statement stating that the rabbi was "not fit and proper to act in any rabbinic capacity", a decision reached after "extensive investigations, including interviews with alleged victims", and the rabbi was forced to resign from all public positions, including his position on the Beth Din.

After accusations of attempting a whitewash, and a growing fear among the UOHC that Golders Green synagogues would secede from the union in protest at its handling of the case, the union expelled the rabbi's synagogue from the union. However, the union later retracted its expulsion, saying it was the result of a "misunderstanding". One synagogue left the union because its "lack of willingness or ability" to deal with the issue was "a matter of great embarrassment". The saga exposed deep divisions between the Haredim in Golders Green, whose local rabbis attempted to remove the rabbi from all positions of authority, and those in Stamford Hill, whose Jewish community is predominantly Hasidic.

=== Position on child abuse ===
In 2013, a Channel 4 exposé secretly filmed the head of the UOHC, Ephraim Padwa, instructing a person claiming to have been sexually abused as a child not to go to the police, as it would violate the prohibition of mesirah. Subsequently, a spokesman for Padwa doubted the credibility of the alleged victim, claiming the allegations had already been dismissed by social services as "malicious". The Union denied claims that it did not deal with such allegations seriously, and on the eve of the broadcast of the Dispatches episode, it announced the establishment of a child protection committee.
