= Tayyibah Girls' School =

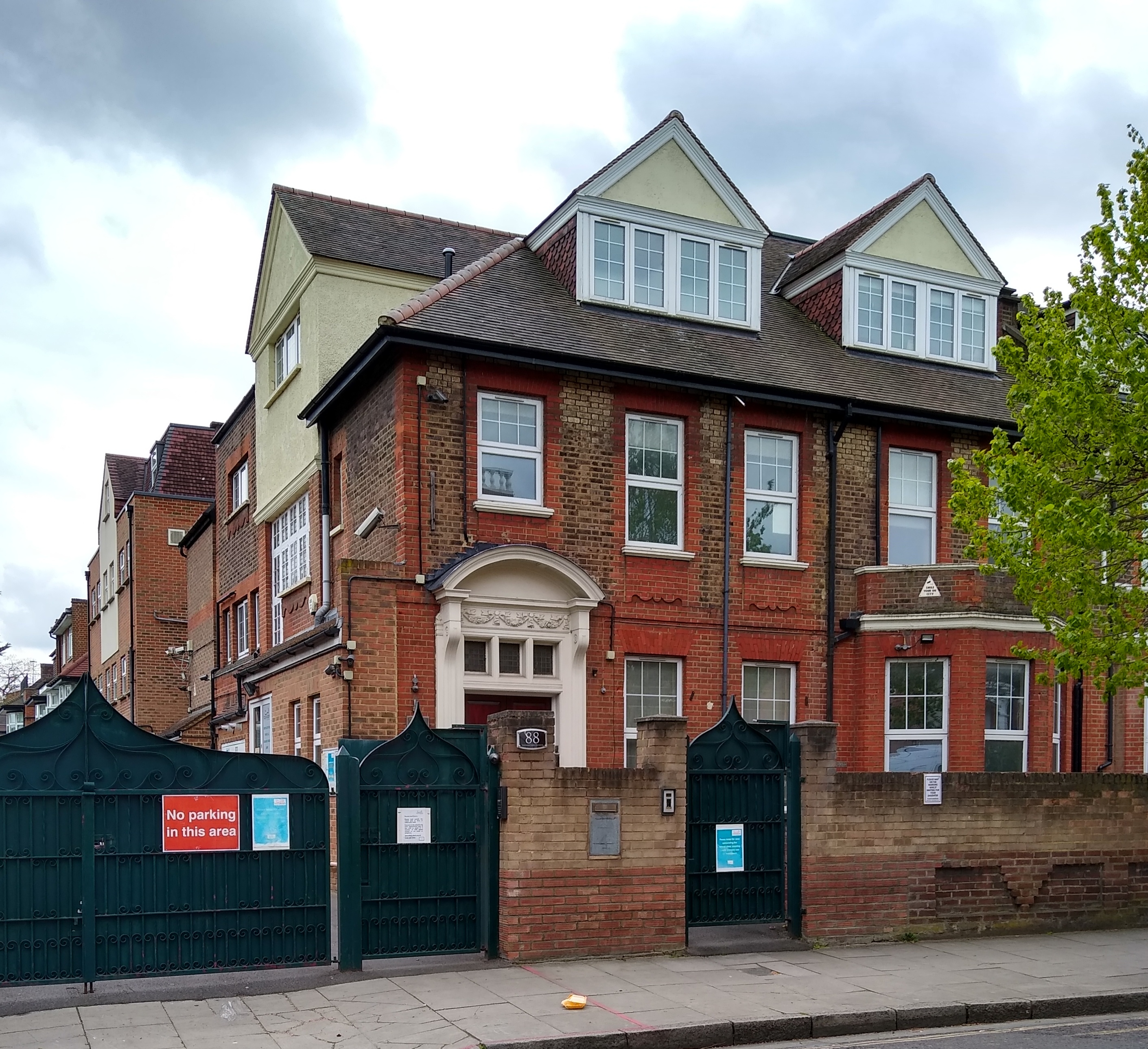

Location
- 88 Filey Avenue; Stamford Hill; London, N16 6JJ; England; 51.5674°N 0.0614°W

Information
- Type: Private school
- Religious affiliation: Muslim
- Established: 1992
- Department for Education URN: 100300 Tables
- Ofsted: Reports
- Gender: Girls
- Age: 4 to 16
- Enrollment: 179 as of May 2022
- Colours: Green and white

Tayyibah Girls' School is an all-girl independent Islamic primary and secondary educational institute for girls aged 4 to 16. It is located in Hackney, London, United Kingdom.

== History ==
Tayyibah Educational Trust was established in September 1992. Tayyibah Girls' School is the flagship project of the trust.

The school started in a basement flat in Cazenove Road, Stamford Hill, with just four girls. Today, there is a full primary and secondary school. The school moved to its current premises in 1993. Further extension was made to the building.
