= John Bransby =

English educator (1784–1857)

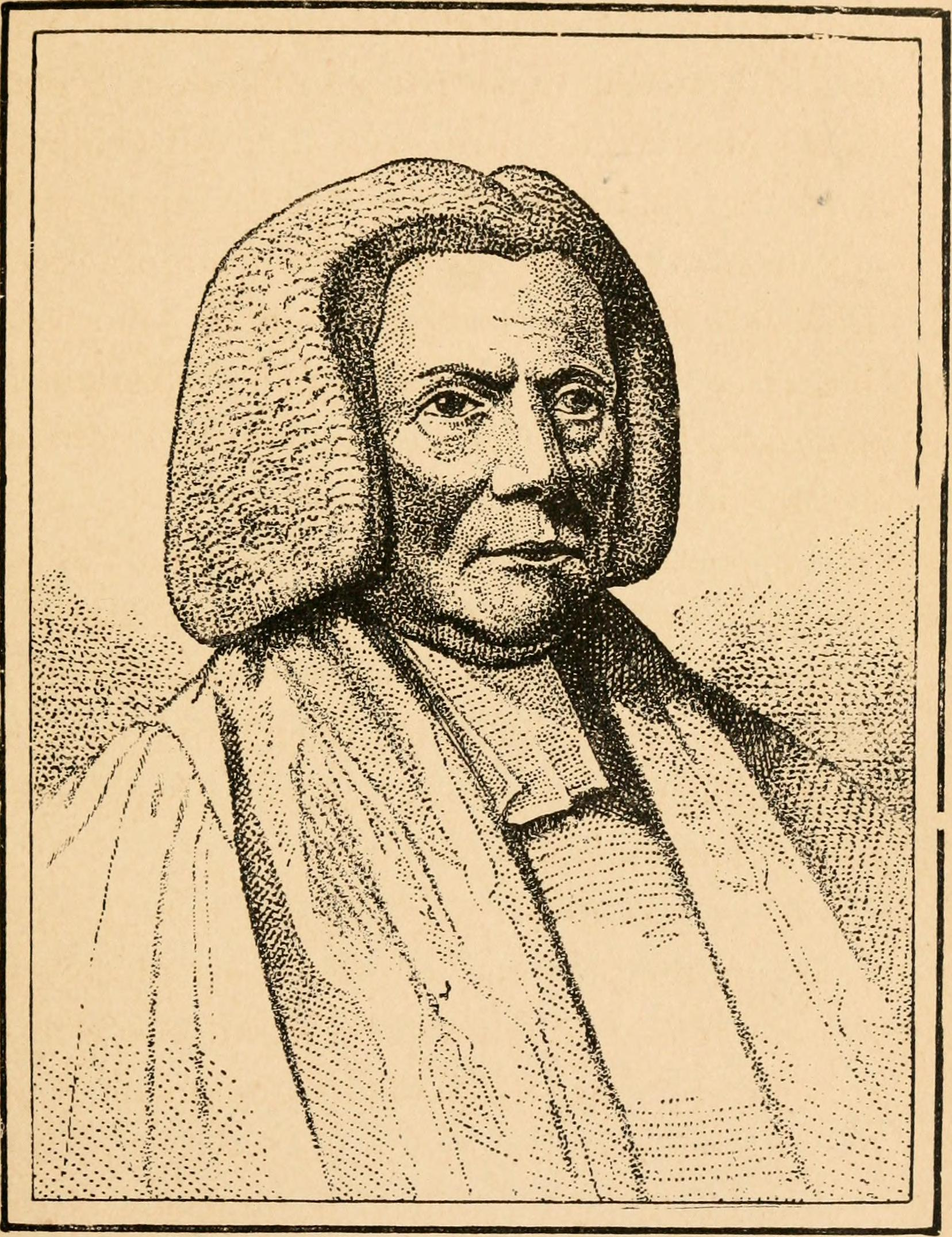
- Portrait of Bransby, published in 1880
- Born: 1784
- Died: 5 March 1857 (aged 72–73); Norfolk, England
- Education: St. John's College, Oxford
- Occupations: Educator, minister, schoolmaster
- Known for: Teacher to Edgar Allan Poe

John Bransby (1784 – 5 March 1857) was an English educator and minister. He is best remembered as a schoolmaster of Edgar Allan Poe, and the basis for the character of "Reverend Doctor Bransby" in Poe's short story, "William Wilson".

== Early life and education ==
Bransby was born in 1784. He attended St. John's College, Cambridge, receiving a Bachelors degree in 1805 and a Master of Arts degree in 1808. Bransby was a cousin of Astley Cooper.

== Career ==
Bransby was a deacon and lecturer at St Mary's (Church of England) parish church from 1814 until 1825. In 1814, Bransby was elected as a fellow of the Linnean Society. He was also a fellow of the Geological Society, the Cambridge Philosophical Society, and the Society of Antiquaries. In 1818, Bransby was admitted to the Society for the Propagation of the Gospel in Foreign Parts. He was also a member of the local horticultural society.

=== Educator ===
In the 1810s, Bransby opened Manor House School on Church Street at his residence in Stoke Newington. From 1817 until 1820, Edgar Allan Poe resided in the house and was one of Bransby's pupils. Bransby was a classicist who educated Poe and other students in Latin, Shakespeare, and Horace.

Bransby no longer ran the school by 1825, when he moved to Norfolk to become the new headmaster of the King's Lynn Grammar School. In 1845, he became the rector of Testerton parish in Norfolk.

== Death and legacy ==
Bransby died in 1857 in Norfolk. Bransby is the basis for the character of "Reverend Doctor Bransby" in Poe's 1839 short story, "William Wilson". He was irritated by the depiction of the character as "solemn" and "sour."

Bransby has been regarded by historians as an influential figure in Poe's early education in various languages and poetry.
