= Yesodey Hatorah Senior Girls' School =

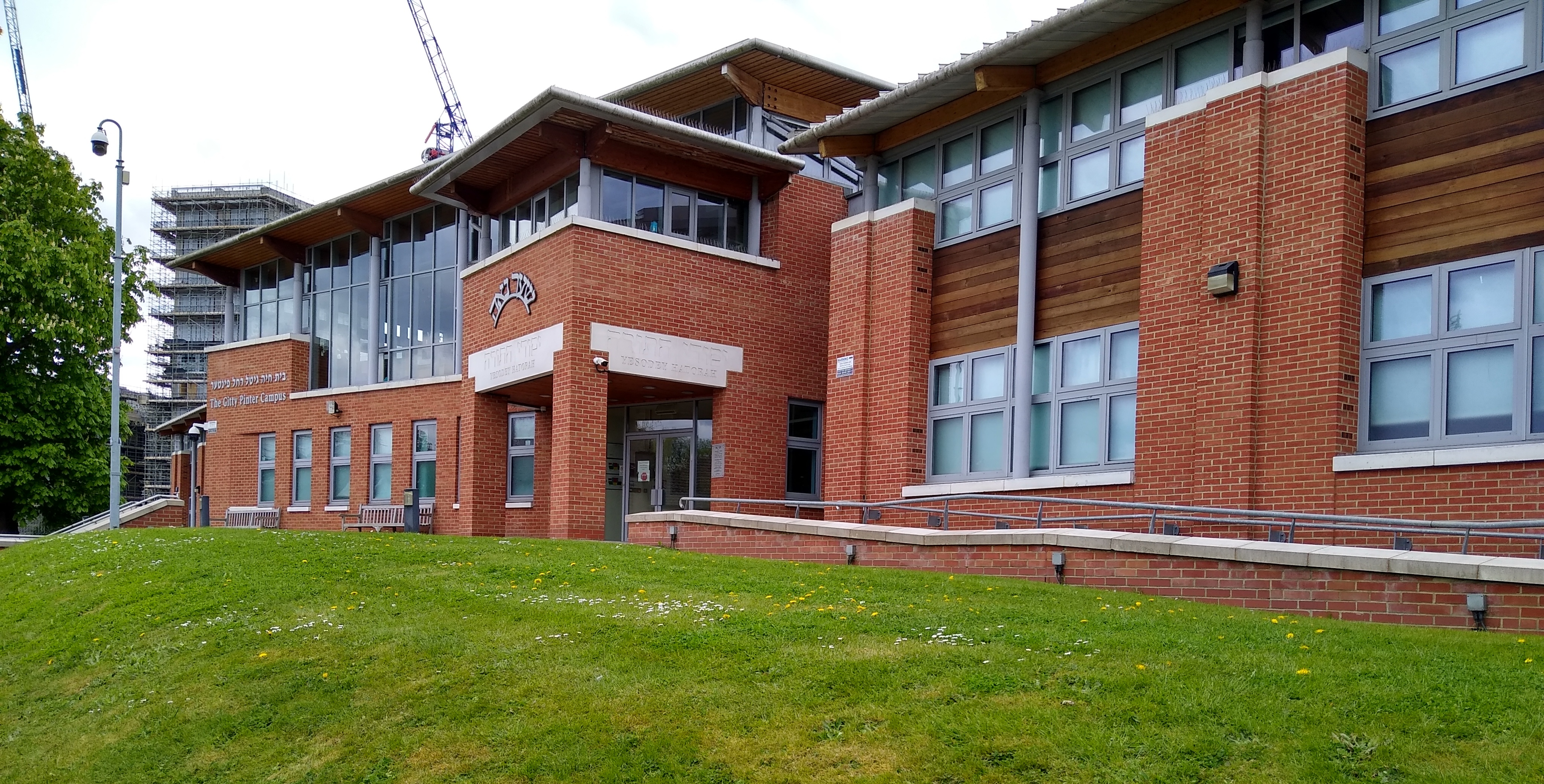

Location
- Egerton Road; Stamford Hill, Greater London, N16 6UB; England
- 51°34′26″N 0°04′12″W

Information
- Type: Voluntary aided school
- Religious affiliation: Charedi Judaism
- Established: 1942
- Local authority: Hackney
- Department for Education URN: 133599 Tables
- Ofsted: Reports
- Principal: Rabbi C Pinter
- Acting Headteacher: C Neuberger
- Gender: Girls
- Age: 11 to 16
- Colour: Red 🟥

Yesodey Hatorah Senior Girls' School is a state-funded Jewish secondary school for girls, located in the Stamford Hill area of the London Borough of Hackney, in England. The school primarily serves the Charedi Jewish community of Stamford Hill.

The school has been rated "good" by Ofsted in 2024, following it being rated "inadequate" in 2018, for the restrictive education it provided to its pupils. Ofsted reported that it now matched the breadth and ambition expected nationally and that pupils "are very well prepared for the next stage of their education, employment or training."

The Charedi community does not have access to television, the Internet, or other media, and members of the community aim to lead modest lives governed by the codes of Torah observance. In 2008, it emerged that nine pupils, supported by their parents, had refused to sit a Key Stage 3 Shakespeare test on The Tempest because they felt the character of Shylock in The Merchant of Venice was antisemitic. There have also been recurring controversies at the school due to failures to teach sex education, the theory of evolution, or various aspects of British history.

== History ==
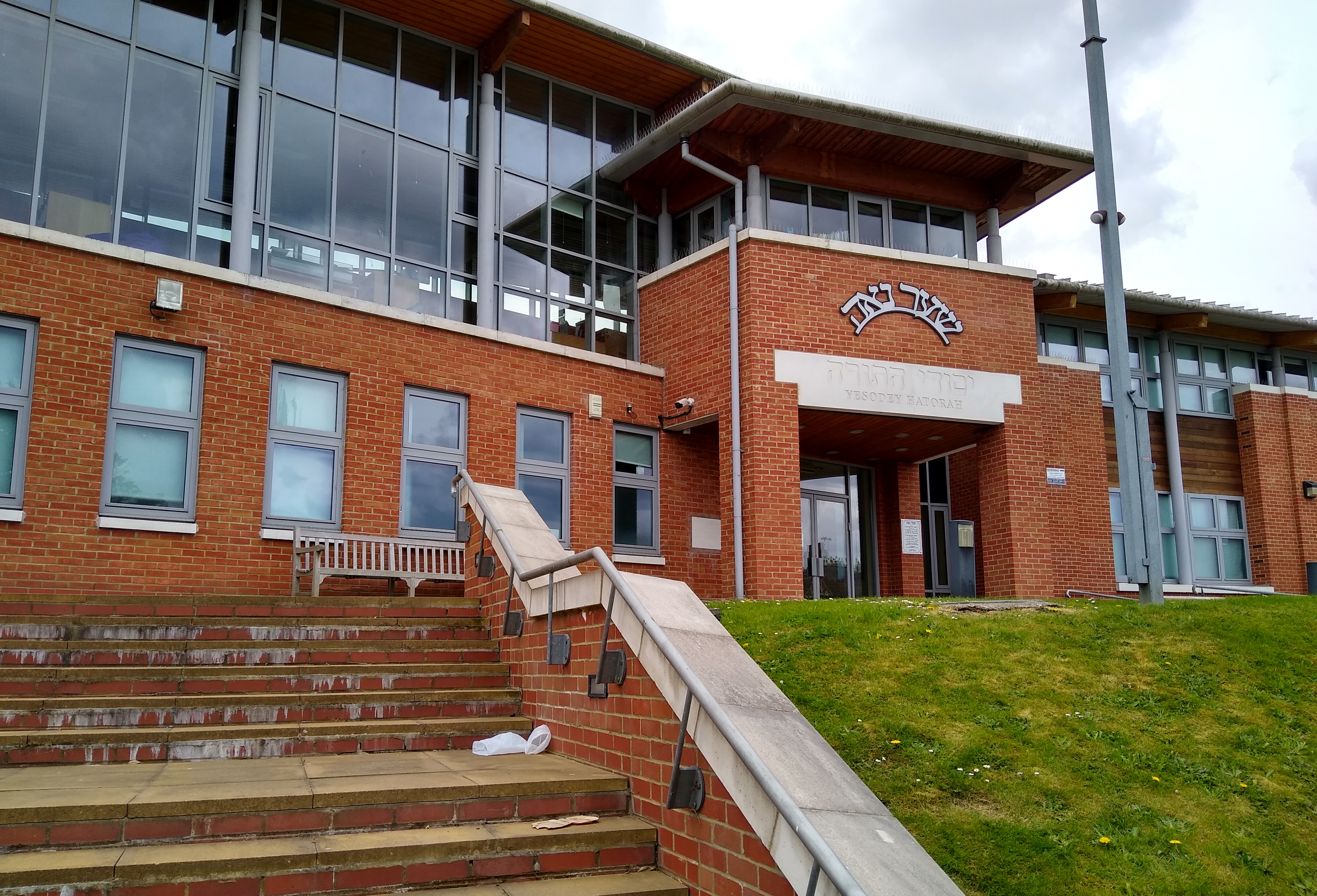

The school was founded in 1942 as a private school with separate sections for boys and girls, and with junior and senior departments. The girls' senior department became a voluntary aided school in September 2005. At this time, the school moved into new accommodation. Several figures attended the formal opening of the new school building, including Tony Blair, Lord Levy, Gerald Ronson, and Richard Desmond. In 2007, the school was top of the Department for Education's school's "value-added" scoring system for pupil progress. In October 2014, the school was downgraded from "Outstanding" to "Good" in its ratings by the Ofsted inspectorate, following a no-notice inspection.

In 2014, the Oxford, Cambridge, and RSA (OCR) Exam board, having conducted an investigation into alleged exam malpractice, concluded that the school had redacted (deleted) questions involving the evolution of species on GCSE science exam questions. Ofqual subsequently ruled that blocking out exam questions is malpractice, and, accordingly, not permissible. However, it was later revealed that OCR had privately agreed that the school could advise students not to answer particular questions if they "need to do this in view of their religious beliefs". It was downgraded to "inadequate" in 2018, due to not following the national curriculum, limiting pupils' access to knowledge, poor governance, poor quality teaching, lack of safeguarding, lack of respect for diversity or promotion of tolerance, and failures to meet statutory requirements to equip pupils for adulthood in British society.

The school's then-principal, Rabbi Abraham Pinter, said in 2015 that few students go to university because "there isn't the environment for Haredi girls to do that", and that "our experience is that the better educated girls turn out to be the most successful mothers. For us, that's the most important role a woman plays."

In 2018, the school admitted censoring sections of GCSE textbooks to remove mentions of homosexual people and examples of women socialising with men.

In April 2020, the school's then-principal, Rabbi Avrahom Pinter, died after contracting COVID-19.

In January 2021, the school hosted a wedding with around 150 guests in the midst of the COVID-19 pandemic, against lockdown rules. The organiser is facing a £10,000 fine for breaching coronavirus regulations, and five guests were issued £200 fines. A spokesman for the school commented "we had no knowledge that the wedding was taking place", and "We are absolutely horrified about last night's event and condemn it in the strongest possible terms." The Mayor of Hackney, Philip Glanville, said "Unfortunately, similar events have taken place even at this venue before and we need to be really clear how unacceptable it is." In April, Hackney’s director of education, Annie Gammon said that the schools governors had shown “significant commitment to working with the council to take forward the recommendations from both the internal and external investigations and to ensure that the school’s lettings process is transparent and accountable”.

In April 2021, Ofsted visited the school as a monitoring inspection and noted that the "Leaders and those responsible for governance are taking effective action to provide education in the current circumstances."

In May 2024, Ofsted visited the school and graded them as 'Outstanding' for Quality of education and Behaviour and attitudes, and 'Good' for Personal development and Leadership and management. They were rated 'Good' overall.
