= Lubavitch Senior Girls' School =

Chabad school

Coordinates: 51.5722°N 0.0733°W

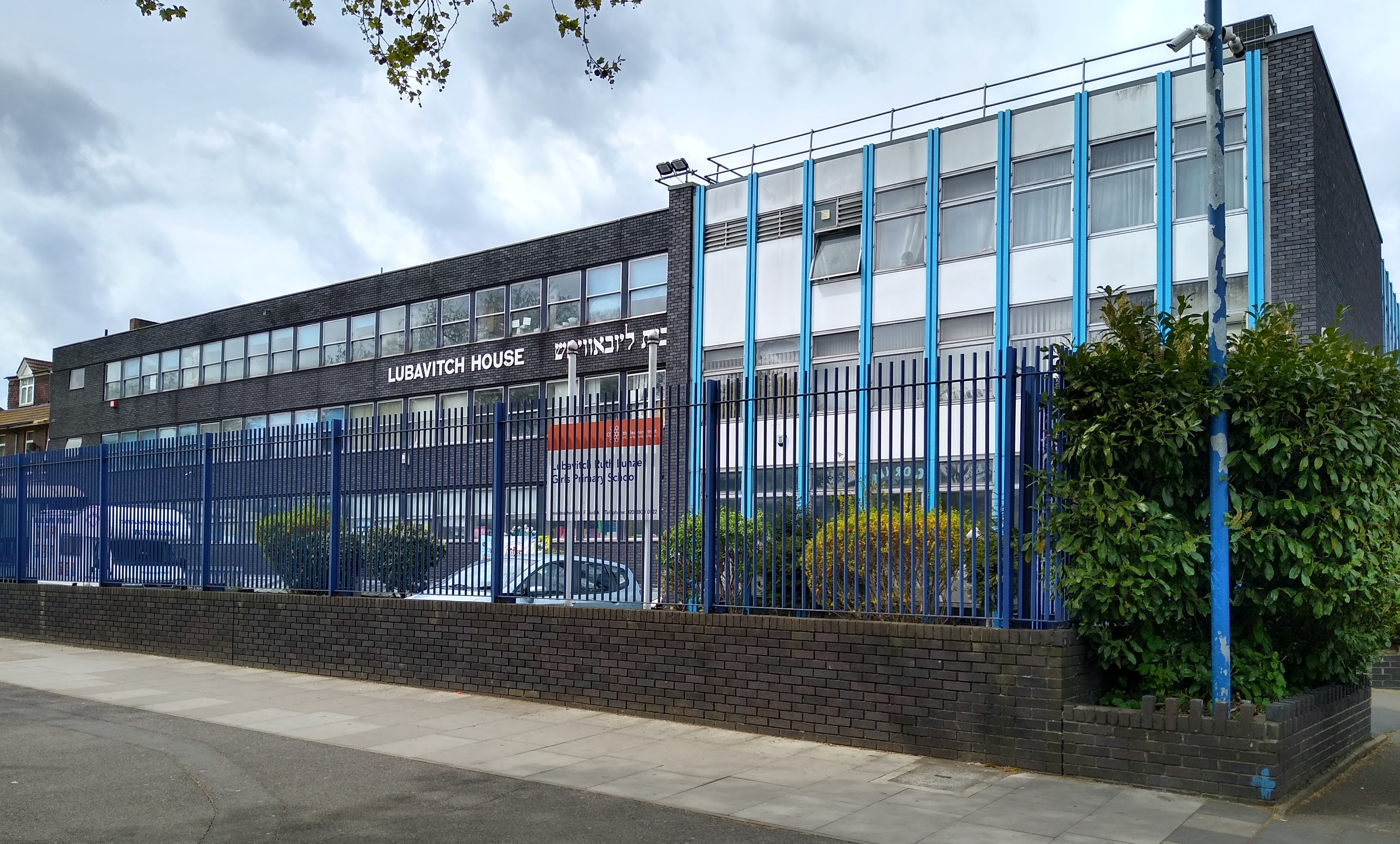
- Lubavitch House, location of Lubavitch Senior Girls' School

Location
- Lubavitch House; 107-115 Stamford Hill, Greater London, N16 5RP; England

Information
- Type: Academy
- Religious affiliation: Orthodox Judaism
- Established: 1962
- Local authority: Hackney
- Department for Education URN: 145609 Tables
- Ofsted: Reports
- Principal: Rabbi Shmuel Lew
- Headteacher: Helen Freeman
- Gender: Girls
- Age: 11 to 18
- Enrolment: 124
- Capacity: 180
- Colour: Blue 🟦
- Website: https://www.lubavitchseniorgirls.com/

Lubavitch Senior Girls' School is a Jewish secondary school and sixth form for girls, located in the Stamford Hill area of the London Borough of Hackney in England. The schools is guided by the principles of the Chabad-Lubavitch movement.

First opened as a private school in 1962, Lubavitch Senior Girls' School became a voluntary aided school in 2012 under the control of Hackney London Borough Council. In April 2018 Lubavitch Senior Girls' School converted to academy status and is now sponsored by The Lubavitch Multi Academy Trust.

Lubavitch Senior Girls' School offers GCSEs as programmes of study for pupils, while students in the sixth form have the option to study from a range of A Levels. The curriculum of the school is divided between secular subjects (Chol) and religious studies (Kodesh). Secular subjects include Modern Hebrew, while religious studies include the Yiddish language and Jewish history.
