= Skinners' Academy =

Skinners' Academy (previously Skinners school for girls)
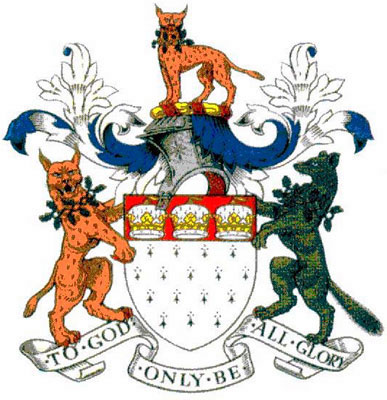

Location
- Skinners' Academy, Woodberry Grove; Hackney, London, N4 1SY; England; 51.572677°N 0.073050°W

Information
- Type: Academy
- Motto: "Be the best you can"
- Established: 1890
- Department for Education URN: 136137 Tables
- Ofsted: Reports
- Chair of Governors: David Fitzsimmons
- Head teacher: Rachael Adediran
- Gender: Girls/boys
- Age: 11 to 19
- Enrolment: 987

Skinners' Academy (formerly The Skinners' Company's School for Girls) is a school in the Manor House (Woodberry Down) area for boys and girls aged 11–19. The academy opened in 2010 and is supported by the Worshipful Company of Skinners, a London Livery Company. There are currently approximately 900 pupils on roll from Year 7 - Year 11 and over 100 Sixth Form students. More than 60% of the pupils speak English as an additional language and more than 86% of students are from ethnic minority backgrounds.

In March 2017 the academy had a short Ofsted inspection which resulted in the academy retaining its recognition as a 'Good' school.

== History ==
=== The Skinners' Company ===
The Worshipful Company of Skinners (known as The Skinners' Company) is one of the “Great Twelve” Livery Companies with a history going back some 700 years. It is one of the most ancient of the City Guilds and developed from the medieval trade guild of the furriers. Members of the guild dressed and traded furs that were used for trimming and lining the garments of richer members of society.

The company, as the guild is now called, is no longer associated with the craft but continues to contribute to educating the young and helping the older in need, through their almshouses, charities and schools. The Skinners' Company's School for Girls is the fourth school that was opened by the Skinners' Company. The other schools respectively are the Sir Andrew Judd's free school (now called Tonbridge School), The Skinners' School and Sir Andrew Judd's Commercial School (now called The Judd School).

=== The Skinners' Company's School for Girls ===
The site of the original school building (now the Upper School) in Stamford Hill was bought in 1883 for £3261 13s 2d by the Skinners' Company. The building was erected at the cost of £10,969 18s 9d and the school was opened, as a public school, in 1890 in order to meet the demand for girls' education in London. Girls started at the age of eight. At that time, the school accommodated 187 girls and 8 teachers.

During the Second World War, the school was evacuated to Welwyn Garden City. Despite this, some emergency lessons were held at the school. The school was also used to house a division of the emergency fire service. The girls also adopted a warship, sending food and clothing for its sailors.

The introduction of the Education Act 1944 led to the school becoming a state grammar school. Fees were abolished and entry was gained through the 11-plus examination.

In 1972, Mount Pleasant County secondary school merged with The Skinners' Company's School for Girls, with the male students transferring to Brooke House school and the female students joining the existing grammar school. From 1972 onwards, the school became London's first voluntary aided comprehensive school and it operated on two sites: the Upper School in Stamford Hill and the Lower School in Mount Pleasant. In 2003, the school's growing Sixth Form formed a consortium with Our Lady's Convent RC High School which it had worked with throughout the 1980s. In 2006, Stoke Newington School also joined the Sixth Form consortium which expanded upon the curriculum of the existing Sixth Form, which was established in 1927. The school was awarded specialist status in recognition of its Business and Enterprise teaching and became a Business and Enterprise College in 2004.

=== Skinners' Academy ===
In 2010, with the sponsorship of The Skinners' Company and the support of Hackney Council and The Hackney Learning Trust, the school reopened as an academy, meeting the demands of the newly regenerated area of Woodberry Down. The school opened as a mixed school accommodating ages 11–19.

=== Leadership ===
To date, Skinners' has had eight Headmistresses (as Skinners' Company School for Girls) and three Principals (as Skinners' Academy).

- Mary Hannah Page (1890–1900)
- Emily Newton (1900–1927)
- Lydia Barton (1927–1952)
- Margaret Gray (1952–1963)
- Pamela Edwards (1963–1984)
- Mary Ludlow (1984–1997)
- Jenny Wilkins (1997-2009)
- Jan Balogh (2009-2010)
- Jenny Wilkins(2010-2013) Skinners' Academy
- Tim Clark (2013–2019) Skinners' Academy
- John Beighton (2019–2020) Skinners' Academy
- Shereka James (2020–2024)
- Sonia Jacob (2024–2026(Feb))
- Rachael Adediran [Acting Principal](2026(Feb)-Present)

== School buildings and grounds ==
The lower school site consists of one building. The upper school site consists of a range of buildings built at various stages of the school history.

Each serve a range of departments:

- The main building (upper school) was the only building of the school when it opened in 1890. It contains administrative offices including school reception, Head and Deputy Head offices and a staff room. It also houses a library, assembly hall, canteen, and classrooms that service various departments and laboratories. This building was extended in 1893, when the gym was built and again in the 1960s when the current ICT classrooms were built.
- The Art Block was built in 1964 and later extended. It contains dedicated rooms for Art, the Sixth Form facilities and facilities for those with special educational needs.
- The Business Huts were built to accommodate the school's specialist business and ICT facilities.
- The Science/Technology block is the newest building on the school grounds, built in 1994. This provides dedicated resources for the teaching of Science and Design and Technology.

In order to achieve the school's aim of sustainability, fruit and vegetables are grown on school grounds for use in the canteen.

At the upper school site there is a rowan tree, which was given to the school by the Skinners' School Old Girls Association. The rowan tree recognises the school's origins with the Skinners' Company, as rowan berries were used for tanning leather.

== Present and future plans ==
The school currently operates on a split site basis, with years 7–9 in the lower school and years 10–13 in the upper school. However, due to the inefficiency and the limitations caused thereof, plans have been made to relocate the school as an academy to a single site at Woodberry Down, under the Woodberry Down Regeneration project in 2010. In order to prepare for the transition of sites, in the academic year of 2006–2007 the school took its final cohort of year 7s. In the academic year of 2008–2009, the lower school site shall be closed and the then years 9-13 shall be accommodated in the upper school. To adapt to these changes some innovative teaching and curriculum practices will be adopted, including vertical tutoring.

== Academics and curriculum ==
The academic curriculum in the years leading to GCSE reflects the National Curriculum in its breadth and balance. The school offers a range of vocational and academic subjects at GCSE and A- Level, most notably in business studies. Of the 127 pupils eligible for GCSEs in 2007, 24.4% had special educational needs. In 2007, 28% of students achieved 5 or more A*-C Grades, including maths and English.

== Extracurricular ==
The school hosts a variety of clubs.

At present the school is part of the Urban Scholars Intervention Programme hosted at the City of London School for Girls, which supports a number of gifted and talented students, through a programme of activities. The school also works in collaboration with NFTE and last year, a group of five students won a nationwide competition for their business ‘Hennoo', their prize included a trip to New York.

The school has links with a number of businesses and companies working within the City of London, these include Linklaters, UBS, Commerz Bank, Hewlett-Packard, HSBC, and The Skinners' Company.

The school has a choir and steel pan club and they've performed at the Skinners' Hall and other venues.

Each year, Sports Day is held at Finsbury Park and all students and staff participate. In addition to this, there are a number of sporting opportunities available to staff and students. These include: football, tennis, volleyball, badminton, canoeing, and kickboxing. Yoga is also available for teachers.

== Prize Giving ==
This event was previously known as "Speech Day", and was held each year at the Upper School. Each November the entire school gathers in the Round Chapel, to celebrate the school and the achievements of the year. The event is attended by the school governors and representatives from the Worshipful Company of Skinners, along with staff and the parents of the girls. The representatives of the Worshipful Company of Skinners dress in lynx fur trimmed robes in order to commemorate the Skinners' Company. Before proceeding to the stage, the beadle of the Skinners' Company knocks his ceremonial staff against the floor twice, indicating the start of the procession. Behind him walks the headmistress, who is followed by a row of school governors and a row of company representatives who bear the silver leopard statue, a symbol of the Worshipful Company of Skinners. Prizes are awarded to individuals who have performed well in their year, along with specific prizes accredited to past headteachers and the SSOGA.

Traditionally, pupils supplement applause by ‘whooping' when the recipient accepts their award. The annual report is read by the headmistress and short speeches are given by a representative from the Worshipful Company of Skinners and the Head Girl and Boy.
