= Our Lady's Catholic High School, Stamford Hill =

Our Lady's Catholic High School
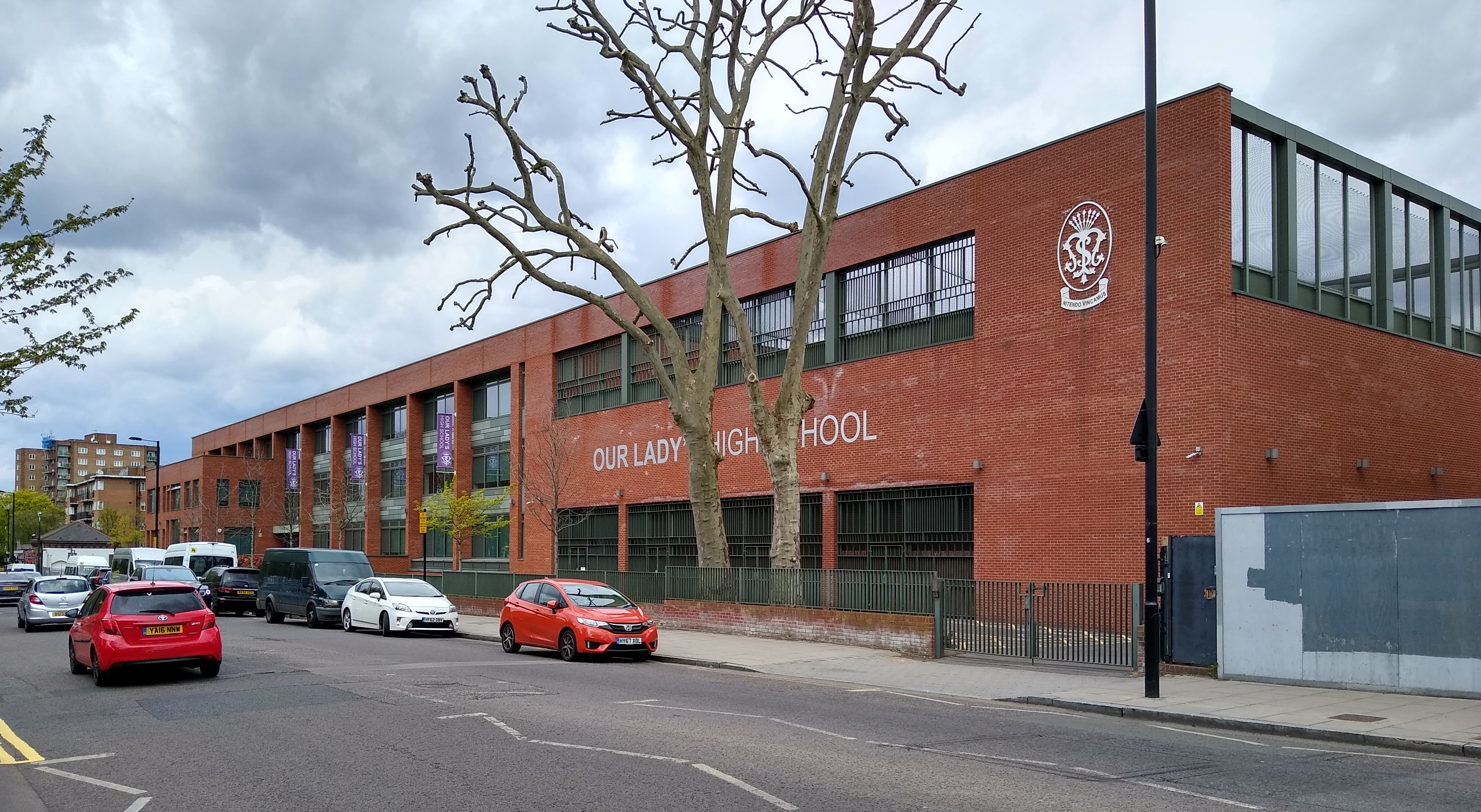

Location
- 6-16 Amhurst Park; London, N16 5AF; England; 51°34′28″N 0°04′32″W

Information
- Type: Voluntary aided comprehensive
- Motto: Nitendo Vincamus (By striving, we conquer)
- Religious affiliation: Roman Catholic
- Established: 1904
- Founders: Servite Sisters
- Local authority: Hackney
- Department for Education URN: 100282 Tables
- Ofsted: Reports
- Head teacher: Andy English
- Gender: Girls
- Age: 11 to 19
- Enrolment: 700+
- Colour: Grey ◻️
- Website: https://www.ourladys.hackney.sch.uk/

Our Lady's Catholic High School is a Roman Catholic secondary school for girls situated in Stamford Hill, in the London Borough of Hackney, England.

== History ==
On 11 January 1904, the Servite Sisters founded a small independent school called Our Lady's School, with Sr M. Phillipa as its first headmistress. The school later moved to 14-16 Amhurst Park during the 1930s. There were 27 pupils aged 10 and over; all the staff were Servite sisters; parents paid fees of £2/10/00 per term. The rooms in the house built in the 1800s were used as classrooms. There was a grass tennis court in the garden. The school has since expanded and the premises consist of the original buildings and newer additions (the most recent in 2003). The first lay headteacher, only the sixth in the school's history, was appointed in 1994. Our Lady's is no longer directly run by the Servites but remains under their trusteeship.

== Current structure ==
Our Lady's is a Voluntary Aided Roman Catholic School, which has been awarded Specialist Status as a Language College. Permission to expand by one form of entry has meant that the school's total number is currently 780 students. The Sixth Form Centre admits boys and girls and has currently 180 students.

In 2010, the school became a split site, since as part of the Building Schools for Future (BSF), the school was to be completely remodelled and rebuilt. The lower school (years 7 and 8) remained at the old site in Stamford Hill. The upper school (years 9, 10, 11 plus sixth form) moved to Upper Clapton, occupying a building put up for the lower school of The Skinners' Company's School for Girls. The rebuilding of the school was finished in 2012. The School came together back on one site in September 2012.

Andy English became head in March 2022. Ofsted visited in March 2022 and reaffirmed the school's rating as 'Good'.

== Departments of the school ==
There are 19 departments in the school.

- Art
- Business studies
- Classical studies
- Citizenship
- Technology
- English
- Geography
- Government and politics
- Drama
- Health and Social Care
- History
- ICT
- Mathematics
- Modern languages
- Music
- Psychology
- Physical education
- Religious studies
- Science
- Sociology
- Economics

== Notable former pupils ==
- Dame Barbara Windsor (1937-2020) - actress, BBC soap opera EastEnders, attended the school circa 1940s-1950s (left without graduating)
- Moira Stuart (b. 1949) - BBC broadcaster and newsreader
- Freema Agyeman (b. 1979) - actress, Doctor Who as Martha Jones, attended the school circa 1990s
