= Stamford Hill =

Area of Hackney, London

Coordinates: 51.5705°N 0.0727°W

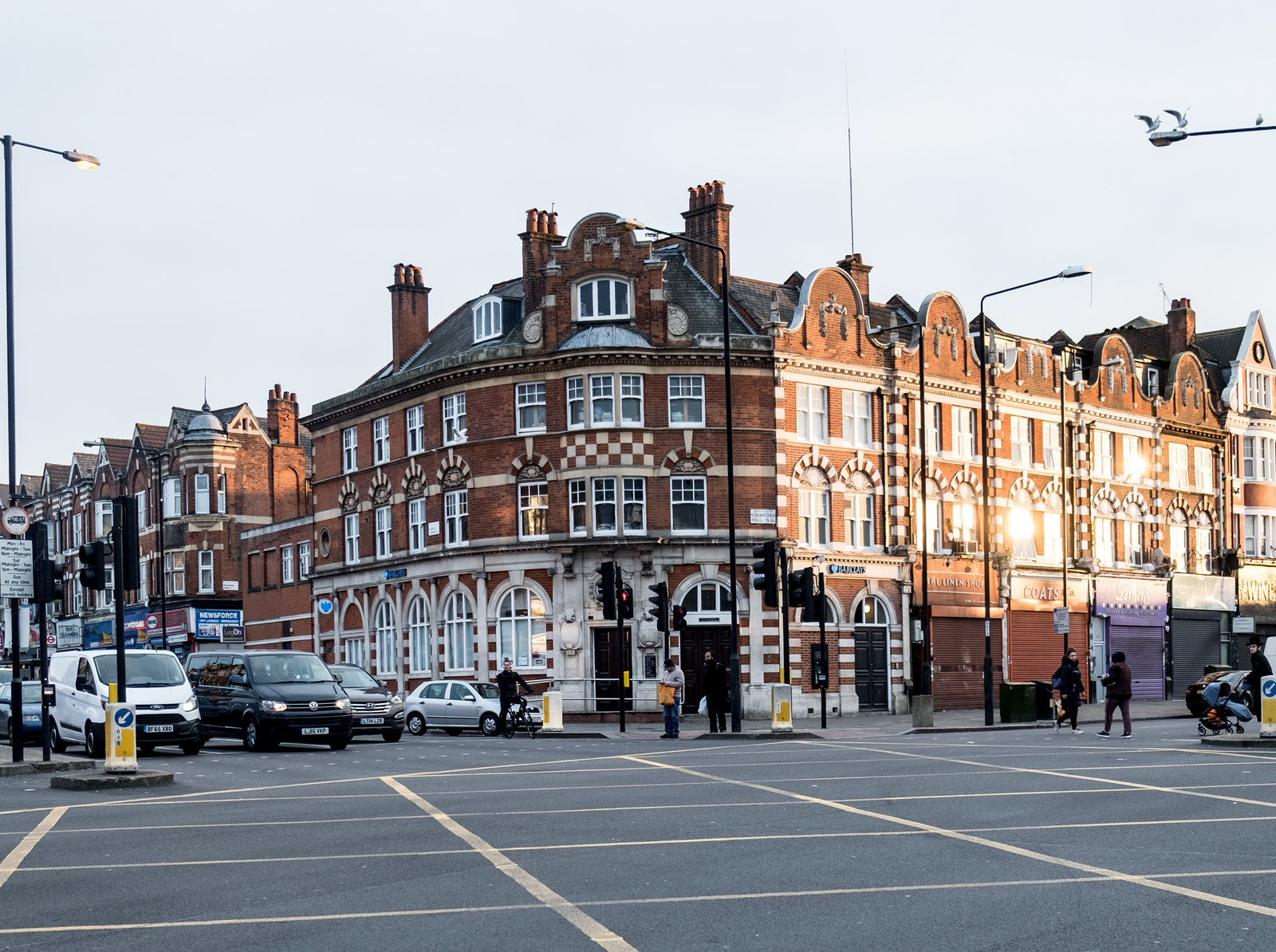

- Location within Greater London
- Area: 2 sq mi (5.2 km^{2})
- Population: 68,050
  - Density: 34,025/sq mi (13,137/km^{2})
- OS grid reference: TQ335875
  - Charing Cross: 5 1/2 mi (8.9 km) SSW
- London borough: Hackney; Haringey
- Ceremonial county: Greater London
- Region: London
- Country: England
- Sovereign state: United Kingdom
- Post town: LONDON
- Postcode district: N16, N15, E5
- Dialling code: 020
- Police: Metropolitan
- Fire: London
- Ambulance: London
- UK Parliament: Hackney North and Stoke Newington; Tottenham
- London Assembly: North East; Enfield and Haringey

Stamford Hill is an area in North London, England, about 5 1/2 miles (9 kilometres) northeast of Charing Cross. The neighbourhood is primarily located in the London Borough of Hackney, with its northern section extending into the London Borough of Haringey, and is known for its Hasidic community, the largest concentration of orthodox Ashkenazi in Europe.

The district takes its name from the eponymous hill, which reaches a height of 108 feet (33 metres) AOD, and the originally Roman A10 also takes the name "Stamford Hill", as it makes its way through the area.

The hill is believed to be named after the ford where the A10 crossed the Hackney Brook on the southern edge of the hill. Sanford and Saundfordhill are referred to in documents from the 1200s, and mean "sand Ford". Roque's map of 1745 shows a bridge, which replaced the ford, referred to as "Stamford Bridge".

The hill rises gently from the former course of the Hackney Brook to the south, and its steeper northern slope provided a natural boundary for the traditional (parish and borough) extent of Hackney, and now does so for the wider modern borough.

== History ==
A map showing the Stamford Hill ward of Hackney Metropolitan Borough, as it appeared in 1916.

Stamford Hill lies on the old Roman road of Ermine Street, on the high ground where it meets the Clapton Road, which runs from central Hackney. By the 18th century, the Roman road (nowadays numbered as the A10) was subject to heavy traffic, including goods wagons pulled by six or more horses, and this caused the surface of the road to deteriorate. The local parishes appealed to Parliament in 1713 for the right to set up a Turnpike Trust, to pay for repairs and maintenance. Gates were installed at Kingsland and Stamford Hill, to collect the tolls.

Roque's map of 1745 shows a handful of buildings around the Turnpike, and by 1795, the A10 was lined with the large homes and extensive grounds of wealthy financiers and merchants attracted, in part, by the elevated position.

Stamford Hill had a gibbet that was used to display the remains of criminals executed at Tyburn in the 1740s. In 1765, a map of the area showed the Gibbet Field south of the road from Clapton Common, behind Cedar House.

The area remained essentially rural in character, and little more was built until the arrival of the railway in 1872, and the tram system at about the same time. Stamford Hill was the point where the tram line coming north from the City met the Hackney tram line, and so, it became a busy interchange, with a depot opening in 1873. Electrification commenced in 1902 and by 1924 a service was commenced between Stamford Hill and Camden Town along Amhurst Park.

Stamford Hill had many eminent Jewish residents, including the Montefiore family. Italian-born Moses Vita Montefiore (died 1789) was living there in 1763. His son Joseph (died 1804) married Rachel Mocatta, and his grandson Abraham Montefiore (died 1824) married Henrietta, whose father, the financier Nathan Meyer Rothschild, lived near the modern Colberg Place from 1818 to 1835. The Montefiores' property a little further south was to be transformed by Abraham's grandson, Claude Montefiore, into Montefiore House school. With the increased development of the area, many distinguished families moved away: In 1842, there were few remaining of the wealthy Jews who had once settled in Hackney. The philanthropist and abolitionist MP Samuel Morley had a residence here from about 1860. The gardening writer and cottage gardener Margery Fish was born here in 1892.

Until the late 20th century, East London was the focus of Jewish life in England, with settlement heavily focussed on an area in and around Whitechapel, extending from Bishopsgate to Cable Street. The area was chosen because of its cheap rents and the independent trades, notably weaving and textiles, known colloquially as "the rag trade". This industry is now commemorated in the name of the Weaver line railway which serves Stamford Hill.

Prosperity, integration and later severe wartime bomb damage saw the community disperse to other parts of East London and more widely. From the 1880s, Stamford Hill received a new influx of Jews from the core area of East End settlement and, in 1915, the New Synagogue was transferred to Stamford Hill to serve this growing population.

In 1926, the Union of Orthodox Hebrew Congregations was established in Stamford Hill, and this became a magnet for other strictly observant Jews, many fleeing Nazi persecution in the years before the Second World War. Also, many Jewish families came to the area from other areas of London, refugees in their own way from bombing and post-war clearances for new housing. One of the early Hasidic leaders in Stamford Hill was the Shotzer Rebbe. The Hungarian uprising also led to an influx of Haredi Jews fleeing hardship under Soviet rule. Another notable Jewish resident, from 1955 until his death in 2000, was the spiritual head of the Union of Orthodox Hebrew Congregations, Rabbi Chanoch Dov Padwa.

Stamford Hill, as with the rest of London, had Civil Defence services during World War II. ARP wardens operated from their respective posts to assist the civilian population and emergency services dealing with enemy bombing, gas and later after V-1 and V-2 attacks. Boroughs were divided into sectors with Stamford Hill being within the Post 2 area.

== Governance ==
Stamford Hill has never been an administrative area in its own right; it has always been an area of Hackney. Hackney was an administrative unit with consistent boundaries from the early Middle Ages to the creation of the larger modern borough in 1965. Hackney was based for many centuries on the Ancient Parish of Hackney.

The area was part of the historic (or ancient) county of Middlesex, but military and most (or all) civil county functions were managed more locally, by the Tower Division (also known as the Tower Hamlets), a historic 'county within a county', under the leadership of the Lord-Lieutenant of the Tower Hamlets (the post was always filled by the Constable of the Tower of London). The military loyalty to the Tower meant local men served in the Tower garrison and Tower Hamlets Militia, rather than the Middlesex Militia.

The Ancient Parishes provided a framework for both civil (administrative) and ecclesiastical (church) functions, but during the nineteenth century, there was a divergence into distinct civil and ecclesiastical parish systems. In London, the Ecclesiastical Parishes sub-divided to better serve the needs of a growing population, while the Civil Parishes continued to be based on the same Ancient Parish areas.

The London Government Act 1899 converted the parishes into Metropolitan Boroughs based on the same boundaries, sometimes with minor rationalisations. In 1965, Hackney merged with Shoreditch and Stoke Newington to form the new London Borough of Hackney.

== Geography and boundaries ==
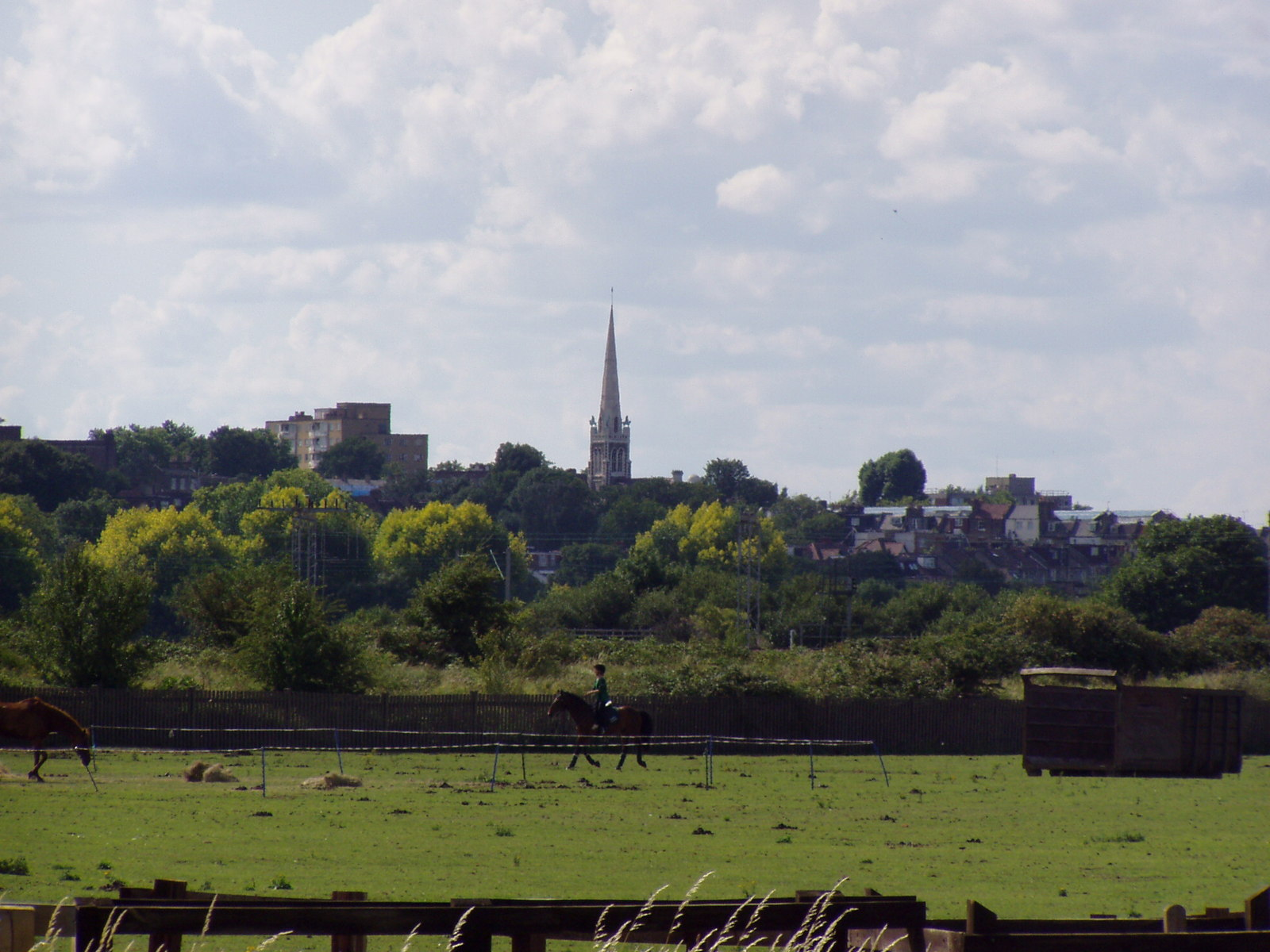
Stamford Hill and Upper Clapton from the River Lea.

Stamford Hill is a gravel topped feature, overlooking the Lower and Middle Lea Valley, which reaches a height of 108 ft (33m) AOD. Much of the higher part of the hill is shared with Upper Clapton. Under typical wind conditions, and in the absence of noise pollution, the hill is the furthest point at which the sound of Bow Bells, a determinant of Cockney identity, can be heard.

The district's usual definition is based on the physical feature of the hill and the neighbourhood's location within the Ancient Parish and subsequent (with almost identical boundaries) Metropolitan Borough of Hackney. It also reflects the fact that what was originally the Roman A10 also takes the name 'Stamford Hill' as it goes over the hill between the brook and the borough boundary.

Northern boundary with Tottenham: Takes the northern boundary of the AP\MB of Hackney. This corresponds to the current boundary between the modern borough of Hackney and Haringey.

Western boundary with Stoke Newington: Takes part of the AP\MB of Hackney's boundary with the AP\MB of Stoke Newington along Bethune Road and down to the A10.

Southern Boundary with West Hackney: The east–west course of the Hackney Brook, which may have been as wide as 22m at this point, provided a natural southern boundary for the district, however the river was culverted and it is now difficult to discern its former course on the ground. This has led to very ambiguous boundary, along its former course, in the Cazenove\Northwold Road area.

East and south-east boundary with Upper Clapton: Upper Clapton is also part of Hackney and shares much of the eastern side of the hill. There is little tradition of a particular border. The post code boundary is sometimes used but this is arbitrary: post code areas are not intended to define districts.

== Demography ==
The high fertility of the Haredi community contributes to the area having one of highest birthrates in the UK, with a crude birth rate of more than 25 per 1,000 of the population, twice the UK average.

The data table shows 2011 ONS Census data for the wards around Stamford Hill, where respondents indicated a religion:

Ward	All	Christianity	Buddhism	Hinduism	Judaism	Islam	Sikhism	other	No religion	not stated
Cazenove	13,392	3,823	93	70	2,868	2,210	122	53	2,730	1,423
Lordship	12,280	3,251	80	49	3,179	977	98	56	3,119	1,471
New River	12,551	3,965	102	40	3,591	1,362	48	33	1,870	1,540
Springfield	12,378	3,799	57	39	3,604	1,745	111	46	1,436	1,541
Seven Sisters	15,968	6,219	165	165	2,883	2,338	75	73	2,639	1,411
Total	66,569	21,057	497	363	16,125	8,632	454	261	11,794	7,386

The London Borough of Hackney has expressed its concern that Haredi Jewish residents are seriously under-counted in the Census data, as the religion question is voluntary.

== Haredi Jewish community ==
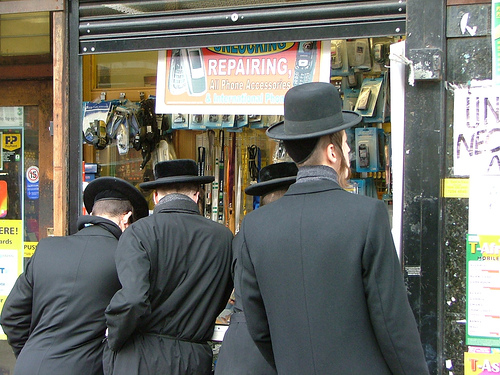
Hasidic Jews in Stamford Hill.

Stamford Hill is at the centre of an Ashkenazi strictly-Orthodox Judaism, and predominantly Hasidic, community estimated to be some 15,000 strong, and growing at a rate of around 5% each year. It is the largest Hasidic community in Europe, and referred to as a square mile of piety, reflecting the many Judaist men seen walking in their distinctive clothes on their way to and from worship. The congregations often represent historical links with particular areas of Eastern Europe in their dress and their worship. Many also retain links with congregations around the world. The largest of these congregations is the Satmar dynasty, which has five directly associated synagogues; Belz is another large community, with four synagogues. As well as Stamford Hill's own Jewish population, there are also many observant Jews in neighbouring Upper Clapton, West Hackney, Stoke Newington, and Tottenham; there may be as many as 80 synagogues in this wider area. other hasidic sects with a presence include Bobov, Vizhnitz, Ger, Slonim, Nadvorna, Karlin Stolin, Dushinsky, Kosov, Biala, Koson, Skver, Alexander, Sanz-Klausenburg, Spinka, Chernobyl, Breslov, Shotz, Munkatch, Kretshnif, Pshevorsk, Toldos Aharon, Tosh, Kehilas Pnei Menachem (Ger split off faction). A faction of the anti-Zionist group Neturei Karta maintains a synagogue in Stamford Hill.

A volunteer emergency response first-aid service called Hatzola (the Hebrew word for rescue) and a volunteer community watch group called Shomrim (the Hebrew word for watchmen) are run by, and largely for, the Judaist community.

The strictly Orthodox Judaism community relies mostly on private education for schooling, with almost all Jewish children attending private, single-sex Jewish schools. In 2005, the Stamford Hill Yesodey Hatorah Senior Girls' School achieved voluntary-aided status. In 2014, the Oxford, Cambridge, and RSA (OCR) Exam board, having conducted an investigation into alleged exam malpractice, concluded that the school had redacted questions involving the evolution of species on GCSE science exam questions. Ofqual subsequently ruled that blocking out exam questions is malpractice, and, accordingly, not permissible. The same year, it was reported by the BBC that many of the yeshivas in the area "usually don't provide any maths, English or science" classes and were operating "without the most basic health, safety, and child welfare checks". In an article on Stamford Hill yeshivas, The Daily Telegraph cited government documents obtained by Channel 4's Dispatches and the Jewish Chronicle as saying that between 800 and 1000 boys aged between 13 and 16 are "missing" from the school system in the borough of Hackney alone.

Haredi families, on average, have 5.9 children, almost 2.5 times the average for England and Wales, and many families live in over-crowded flats. National planning policy and guidance are applied by the local council, prohibiting development of family housing. This has led to conflict between the council and the Jewish population, sometimes represented by the Union of Orthodox Hebrew Congregations. Agudas Israel Housing Association is active in developing housing for the Jewish community in Stamford Hill.

There is also a notable population of Yemenite Jews, especially Adeni Jews who originated in the port city of Aden in Yemen. They settled in Stamford Hill, after fleeing anti-Jewish violence at the end of the Aden Protectorate. The Adeni Congregation synagogue, Nahalat Yosef, is named after the original Adeni synagogue in Yemen. A further wave of immigration of Yemenite Jews occurred in the 1990s and 2000s when several families escaped antisemitic persecution from Houthis in the north of Yemen.

In 2014, the community met with controversy after a sign was spotted in the location reading, "Women should please walk along this side of the road only". The sign was reportedly put up for a Torah Procession parade, and was meant to provide directions for members who wished to avoid contact with the opposite sex. After complaints about the sign were raised, a group of Shomrim who regularly police the area contacted the organisers to tell them that the posters "lacked explanation". The posters were removed, and the organisers agreed to take the signs down more quickly the following year.

Since the 2011 census, there has been a migration of Stamford Hill Hasidic Jews to Canvey Island, in Essex. Canvey Island has a fairly homogenous ethnic make-up, and did not previously have a significant Jewish presence, but community relations appear to be good, and were the subject of a TV documentary. A contributing factor to the healthy relationship is that much of the Canvey community moved there after being bombed out of East London during The Blitz; this connection means there is a folk memory of living alongside Jews.

In what was thought to be a "racially aggravated common assault" that was being investigated by the Metropolitan Police as a "suspected antisemitic hate crime", a man was arrested in October 2026 for an attack on three Jewish women, one of whom had been punched in the face.

== Education ==
The Jesuit order founded St Ignatius' College, nearby, at the foot of the hill, on High Road, Tottenham, in 1894, The school consisted of two houses called Morecombe Lodge and Burleigh House. In 1907, the college was recognised by the Board of Education, and began to receive public money. Notable former pupils of St Ignatius include Alfred Hitchcock and Cardinal Heenan. It remained as a grammar school until 1968, and then became a two-form entry comprehensive school, the Lower School being located at the old Cardinal Allen School in Enfield, and the Upper School in new premises at Turkey Street, Enfield.

Today, Lubavitch Senior Girls' School, Our Lady's RC High School, Skinners' Academy, and Yesodey Hatorah Senior Girls' School are secondary schools located in the area.

There are also many independent or Haredi schools in the area.

== Notable people ==
- Lionel Blair (1928–2021), Canadian-born British actor, grew up in Stamford Hill
- Bernard Butler (born 1970), guitarist, known for his time with Suede; born in Stamford Hill
- Mel Calman (1931–1994), cartoonist and writer, was born in Stamford Hill
- Dave Kaye (1906–1996), pianist, lived in Stamford Hill
- Leona Lewis (born 1985), singer, songwriter, first female winner of The X Factor; lived in Stamford Hill
- Moses Montefiore (1784–1885), financier and philanthropist, lived in Stamford Hill
- Samuel Morley (1809–1886), philanthropist and abolitionist, born in Homerton and lived in Stamford Hill
- Rabbi Chanoch Dov Padwa (1908–2000), Orthodox Jewish posek, Talmudist and rabbinic leader, lived in Stamford Hill
- Nathan Meyer Rothschild (1777–1836), financier, lived in Stamford Hill
- Mark Williams (born 1955), cricketer, was born in Stamford Hill
- Clavish (born 1998), rapper, was born in Stamford Hill
- Paul Greer (born 1975), creator of the Nitro Warriors series of popular stop-motion films, lived in Stamford Hill

== Transport and locale ==
=== Nearby areas ===
- North-west - Harringay
- North - South Tottenham
- North-east - Walthamstow
- West - Manor House
- Centre - Stamford Hill
- East - Clapton
- North - Finsbury Park
- South - Stoke Newington
- South-east - Upper Clapton

=== Nearest stations ===
- Stamford Hill Overground station
- South Tottenham Overground station
- Manor House tube station
- Seven Sisters station
- Stoke Newington Overground station
