= St Mary, Stoke Newington =

English Parish Church/Art Venue

Coordinates: 51°33′39″N 0°05′04″W

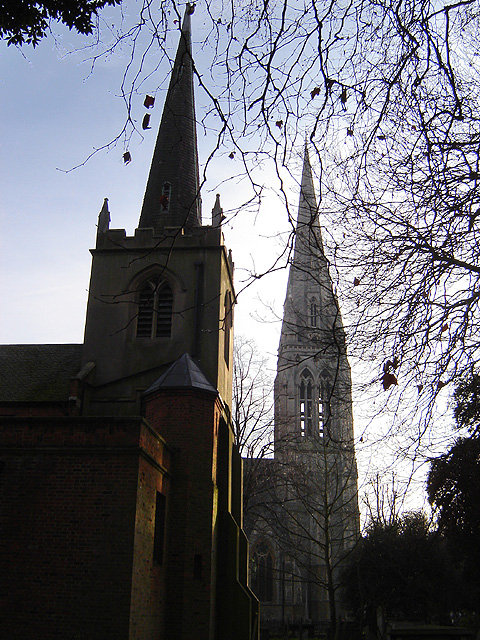
The old (foreground) and new (background) churches.

St Mary, Stoke Newington is a parish church in Stoke Newington, London Borough of Hackney. Designed in the Gothic Revival version of the Decorated style by George Gilbert Scott and completed in 1858, it replaced a medieval and 16th century church, now an arts venue, and serves what remains of the ancient parish of Stoke Newington after other parishes were split from it in 1849, 1873, 1883 and 1892.

The design was loosely based on that of Salisbury Cathedral. It is Grade II* listed. The first vicar was Thomas Jackson, who, as a young rector, was attracting congregations from all over London by his reputation as a preacher. The church's steeple, however, was not completed until 1890, by Scott's son John Oldrid Scott, which led to a humorous rhyme being composed:

"Stoke Newington's a funny place
With lots of funny people;
Thomas Jackson built a church
But could not build a steeple."

A restoration of St Mary's was undertaken under Nugent Cachemaille-Day after the Second World War. It was Grade II* listed on 1 September 1953.

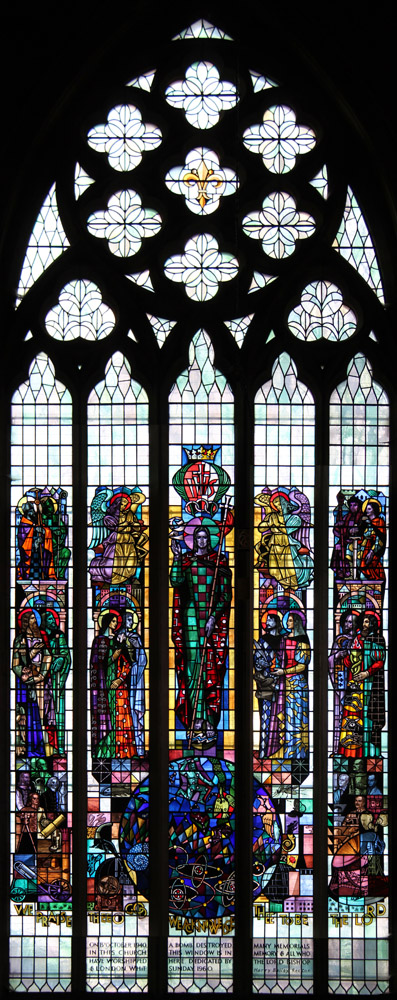
North transept window by W. T. Carter Shapland (1960)

W. T. Carter Shapland's 1960 window for the north transept is particularly distinctive. its modernist design depicts in its lower part a multitude of ephemera associated with science, engineering, and technology, including fossils, constellations, scientific instruments, chemical elements, a steam engine, nuclear reactor and the Jodrell Bank telescope.

Composer William Carter was organist at St Mary, Stoke Newington from 1854 through 1856.
