= Ralph Covell =

English modern architect (1911–1988)

Ralph George Covington Covell
- Born: 6 May 1911; Lee, London
- Died: 16 December 1988 (aged 77); Crowborough, East Sussex
- Occupation: Architect
- Spouses: Marguerite Latter; Lurline Knowles
- Children: two sons
- Parent(s): George William Covell and Elsie Covington
- Awards: Ashpitel Prize; MBE
- Practice: Covell & Matthews; Covell Matthews and Partners
- Projects: Piccadilly Plaza, Manchester (1959–1964)

Ralph George Covington Covell (6 May 1911 – 16 December 1988) was an English modern architect, active during the post-war period to the early 1970s.

Covell married twice, first to Marguerite Latter in 1935 and later to Lurline Stanley Knowles in 1947. Covell won the Ashpitel Prize in 1934 and founded his architectural practice in 1937. During World War II, he served with the Royal Engineers and later worked in Washington until the war ended.

Covell resumed his architectural career post-war and partnered with Albert Edward Thurman Matthews to form "Covell & Matthews." They worked on several Ministry of Defence contracts, including the redevelopment of Piccadilly Gardens in Manchester. The practice expanded over the years, with Covell being elected FRIAS in 1965, and their work included the McCance Building, Livingstone Tower, and John Lewis store in Aberdeen.

Covell retired in 1972, but the practice continued to evolve. He was known for his work on churches, predominantly for the Diocese of Southwark, and was involved in the reconstruction and repair of several churches damaged during the war. He often incorporated unique design elements, such as dalle de verre windows and copper roofing, into his church projects. Covell was also a keen organist and was involved in the replacement of the organ at the Royal College of Organists in 1967.

== Early life and family ==
Ralph was born in Lee, London, on 6 May 1911, the son of George William and Elsie Covell née Covington. The family lived in Lee High Road in the 1930s

In late 1935 Ralph married Marguerite Latter but, after World War II, they had separated and both remarried. Covell married Lurline Stanley Knowles (1913–2005) in 1947.

== Early career and military service ==
Covell won the Ashpitel Prize in 1934 and was admitted ARIBA the following year. Covell founded an architectural practice in 1937 in Westminster where he worked until drafted into the Army. During this period he taught architecture at Croydon College of Art.

During World War II he served with the Royal Engineers and was promoted to the rank of second lieutenant in 1940. He was evacuated from Dunkirk and later posted to Orkney where he was involved in the defences of Scapa Flow. After being recalled to London he was posted to the British Military Attaché in Washington, where he stayed until the end of the war.

== Post-war career ==
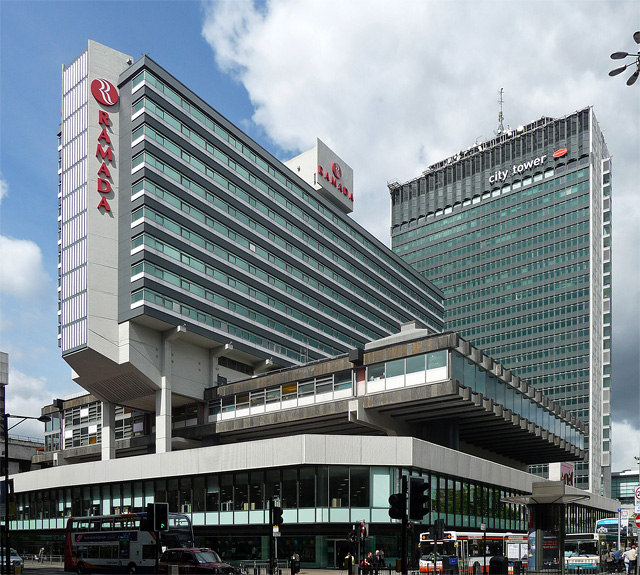
Piccadilly Plaza, Manchester (1959)

After the war, he resumed architectural practice and was elected FRIBA in 1946. Covell was joined by Albert Edward Thurman "Gerry" Matthews in 1948 to form "Covell & Matthews". Matthews had also served in the Royal Engineers, seeing service in Italy and the Western Front. They acquired work with the Ministry of Defence allegedly due to Marshall's wartime acquaintance with Montgomery. This work included contracts in Gibraltar during which time Albert Heasman joined the practice as a senior partner.

Matthews' connections with developers led to their first major contract, part of the 1959 redevelopment of the Piccadilly Gardens area of Manchester City Centre, which led to the practice opening an office in Manchester. The firm developed 'Piccadilly Plaza', a group of three buildings linked by a podium. The tallest, an office block originally called 'Sunley Tower', features a textured design on one side evoking circuit boards. The second, originally the 'Ramada Manchester Piccadilly' is a hotel. The third, 'Bernard House' featured a unique roof described as a "timber structure of hyperbolic paraboloid form, comprising of a main rib element on each of the four axes of twin Glulam Beams" but was demolished in 2001. The Piccadilly Plaza is now considered by some to be an exemplar of modernist architecture.

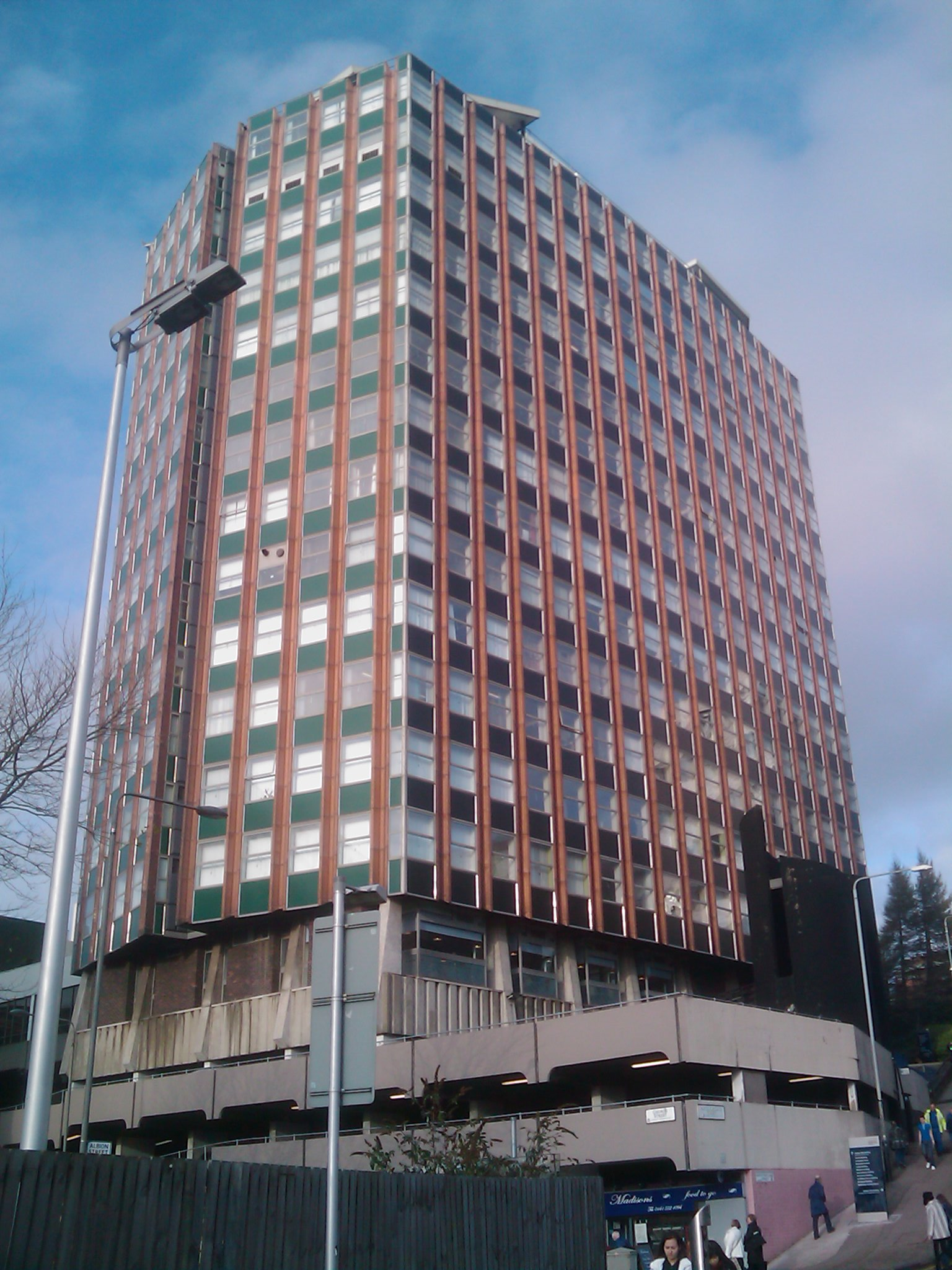
Livingstone Tower, Glasgow (1964)

By 1960 the practice had become "Covell Matthews and Partners" and it expanded rapidly over the following decade, with Brian Falk and John Wheatley joining the practice during this period. By 1970 they had offices in Edinburgh and Aberdeen whilst Covell himself mostly remained based at the Lexington Street office in Soho. Covell himself was elected FRIAS in 1965. During this period the practice was associated with many buildings in Scotland and included the McCance Building (1962–64) and Livingstone Tower (1962-66) for the Royal College of Science and Technology (now Strathclyde University) and the brutalist John Lewis store in Aberdeen (1968–70). However work in England continued including the residential estate at Bar Hill, Cambridge, and a pub in West Ham in 1968.

Although Covell retired in 1972, the practice continued as the "Covell Matthews Partnership" and continued to evolve thereafter.

=== Churches ===
Covell undertook work on several churches, predominately on behalf of the Diocese of Southwark where the practice is associated with 23 church buildings. One early post-war project was the war-damaged reconstruction of Holy Cross, Motspur Park, originally built in 1908, where Covell undertook reconstruction and repair work in 1948. In 1956 Covell designed St Agnes, Kennington Park as a replacement of the original 1874-7 G. G. Scott church following its demolition due to bomb damage. Covell's church included a baptistry beneath a west gallery; north-east lady chapel; vestries and office/meeting room accessed via corridors and a hall complex all set in a small churchyard. A more modest project was the 1958 parish hall in Charlton, London on the site of the former Sundorne Mission Hall in Swallowfield Road, used by St Luke with Holy Trinity church.

The church of St Matthew, Camberwell, was also a Covell-designed replacement for a previous church in Denmark Hill that had mostly been destroyed during a bombing raid on 26 September 1940. Building work commenced in 1959 and was completed in 1960.

St. Katharine with St. Bartholomew Church, South Bermondsey, built in 1960, replaced a former church, bomb-damaged in 1940, and demolished in the late 1950s. Covell's design re-used the basement of the former church. It features zig-zag walls around the nave, a copper-covered nave roof, with abstract dalle de verre windows by W. T. Carter Shapland.

Covell continued the use of dalle de verre and copper roofing at St Richard's Church, Ham, completed in 1966, the glass this time designed by Henry Haig. The church features a Star of David plan creating a hexagonal central space for worship and a matching hexagonal font. Henry Haig provided the dalle de verre windows.

Covell continued the open interior and copper roof themes with the octagonal William Temple church, Abbey Wood, also built in 1966. Covell also designed the font and again commissioned glass from Shapland.

The Church of St Laurence, Catford, built in 1967–8, repeated these themes: an octagonal church with peripheral vestries and other ancillary rooms and a pentagonal Lady Chapel also used as a community centre. Both have exposed reinforced concrete frames which continue over the church to form a corona and to a spirelet with a single bell over the chapel. The dalle de verre glass was Covell's third and final collaboration with Shapland. The church also features further dalle de verre work by W. T. Carter Shapland. The buildings were listed Grade II in 2010.

Covell was a keen organist, playing at St Agnes, Kennington Park. He was also involved in the replacement of the organ in the Royal College of Organists in 1967.

Ralph Covell churches
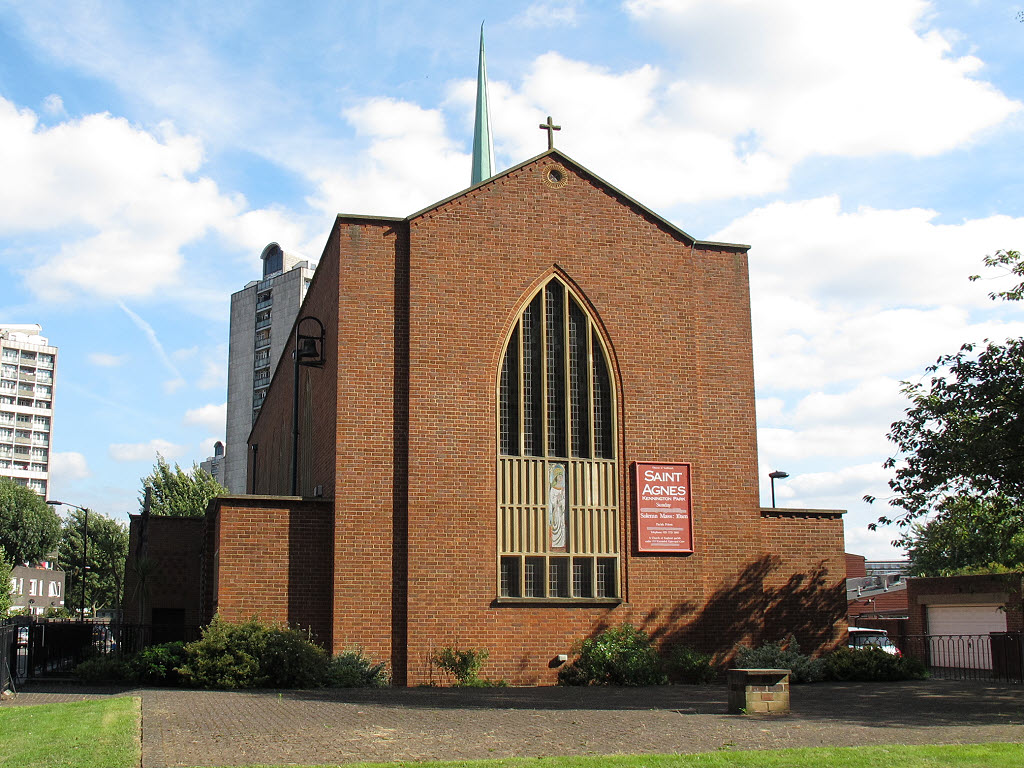
St Agnes, Kennington Park

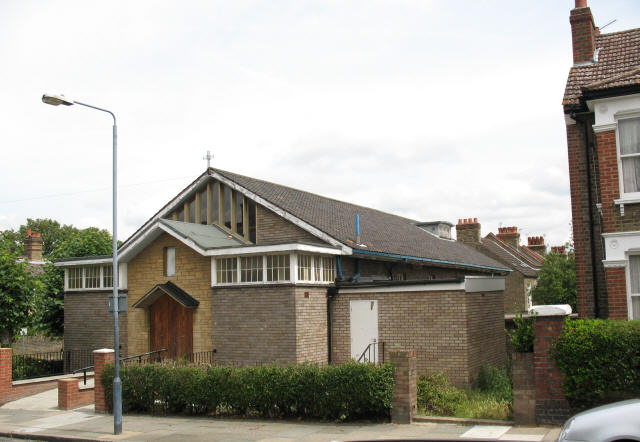
St Richard's church and hall, Charlton

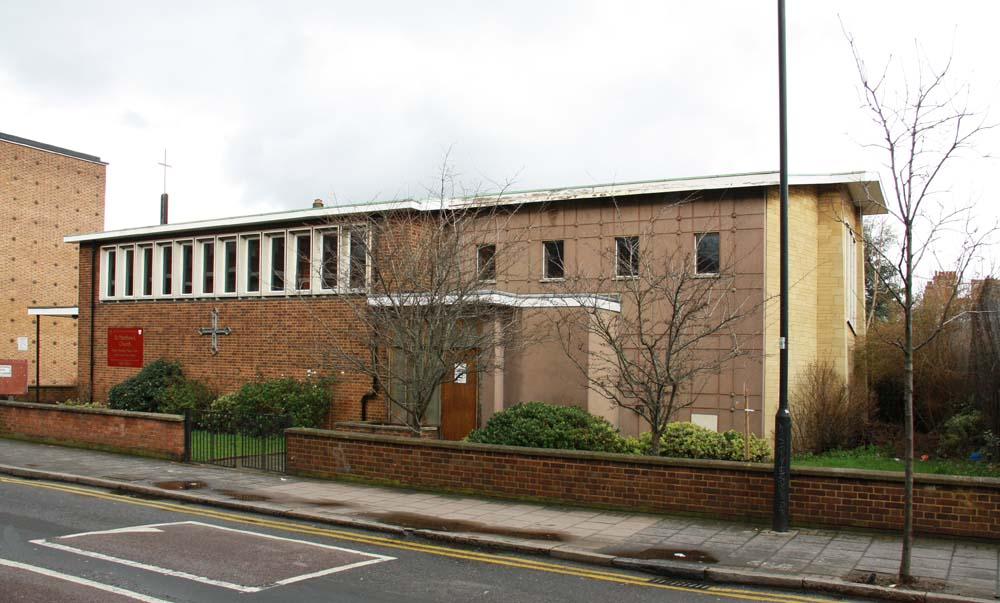
St Matthew, Lilford Road, Camberwell

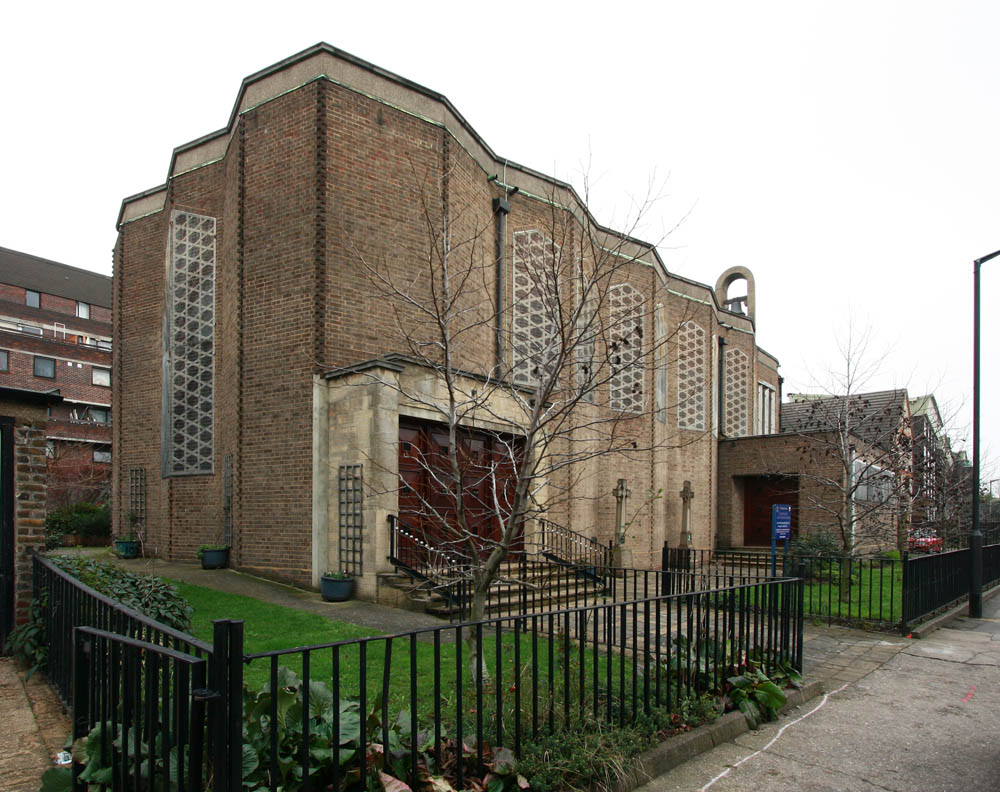
St Katharine with St Bartholomew, Eugenia Road, Bermondsey

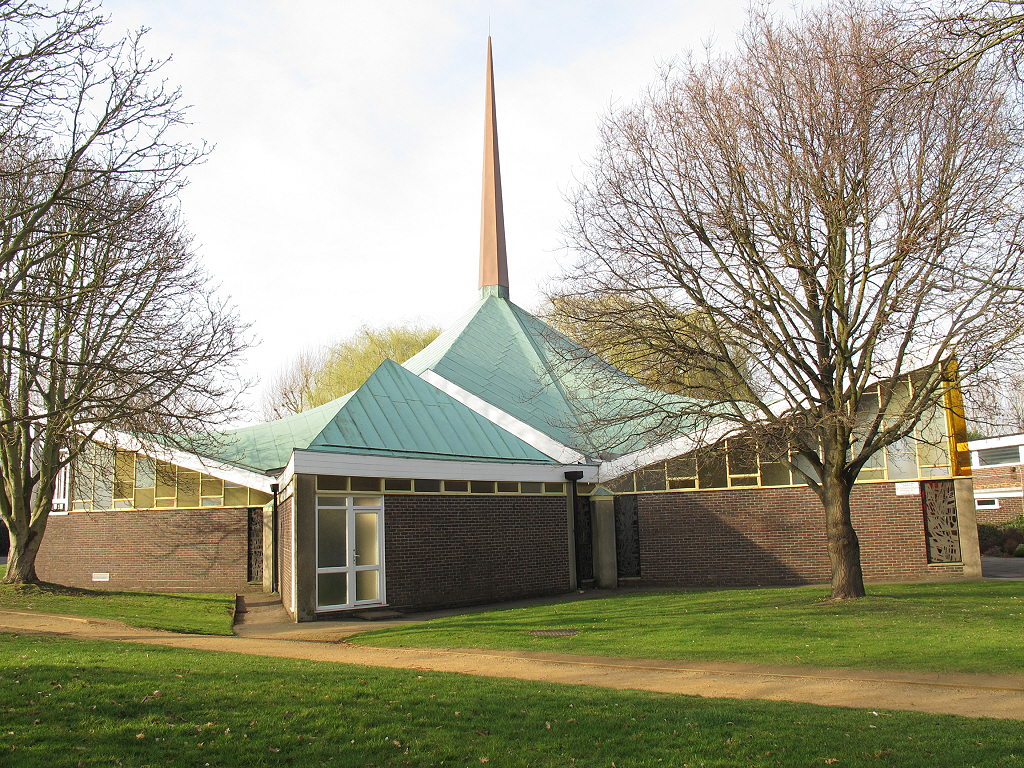
St Richard's Church, Ham

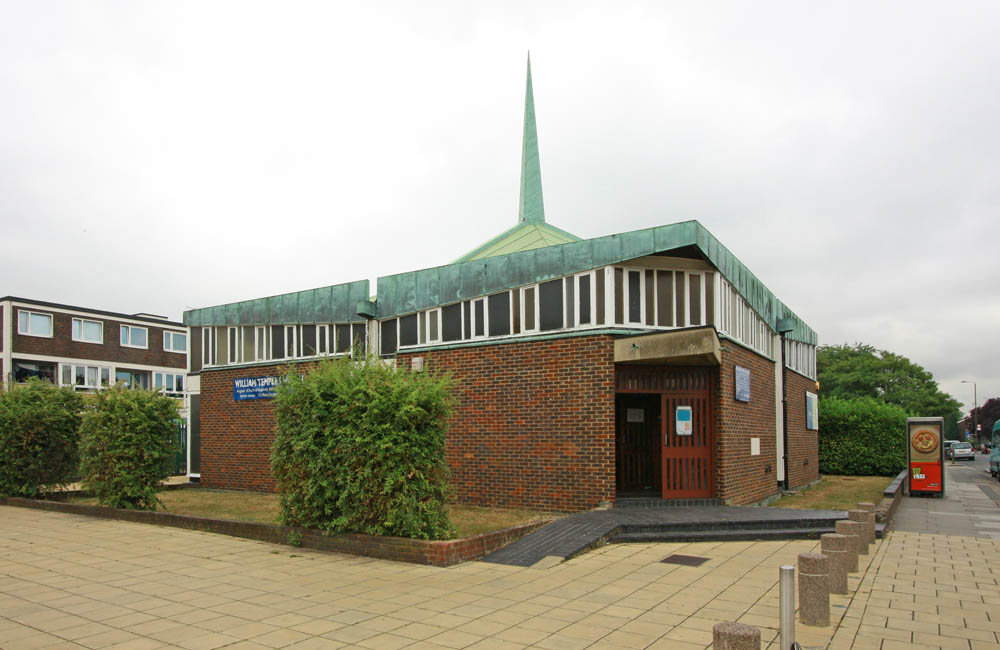
William Temple Church, Abbey Wood

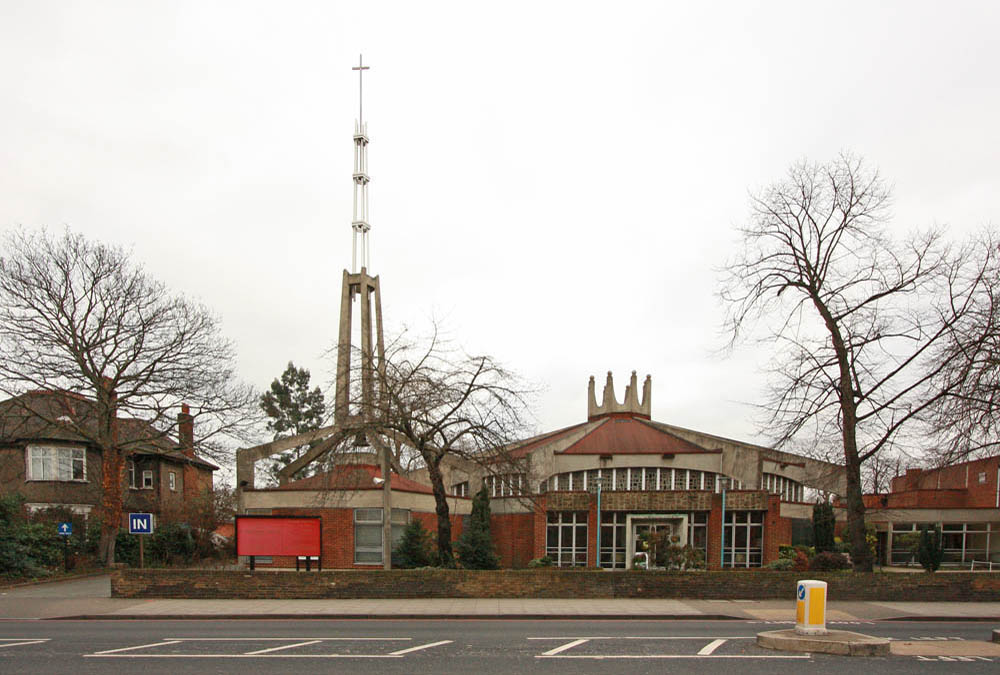
St Laurence, Bromley Road, Catford

== Retirement and death ==
Covell retired in 1972. During the 1980s he served as governor and chairman of St Clement Danes School, Hertfordshire and was appointed MBE in 1985. He died in Crowborough, East Sussex on 16 December 1988, aged 77.
