= W. T. Carter Shapland =

British stained glass artist (1925–1972)

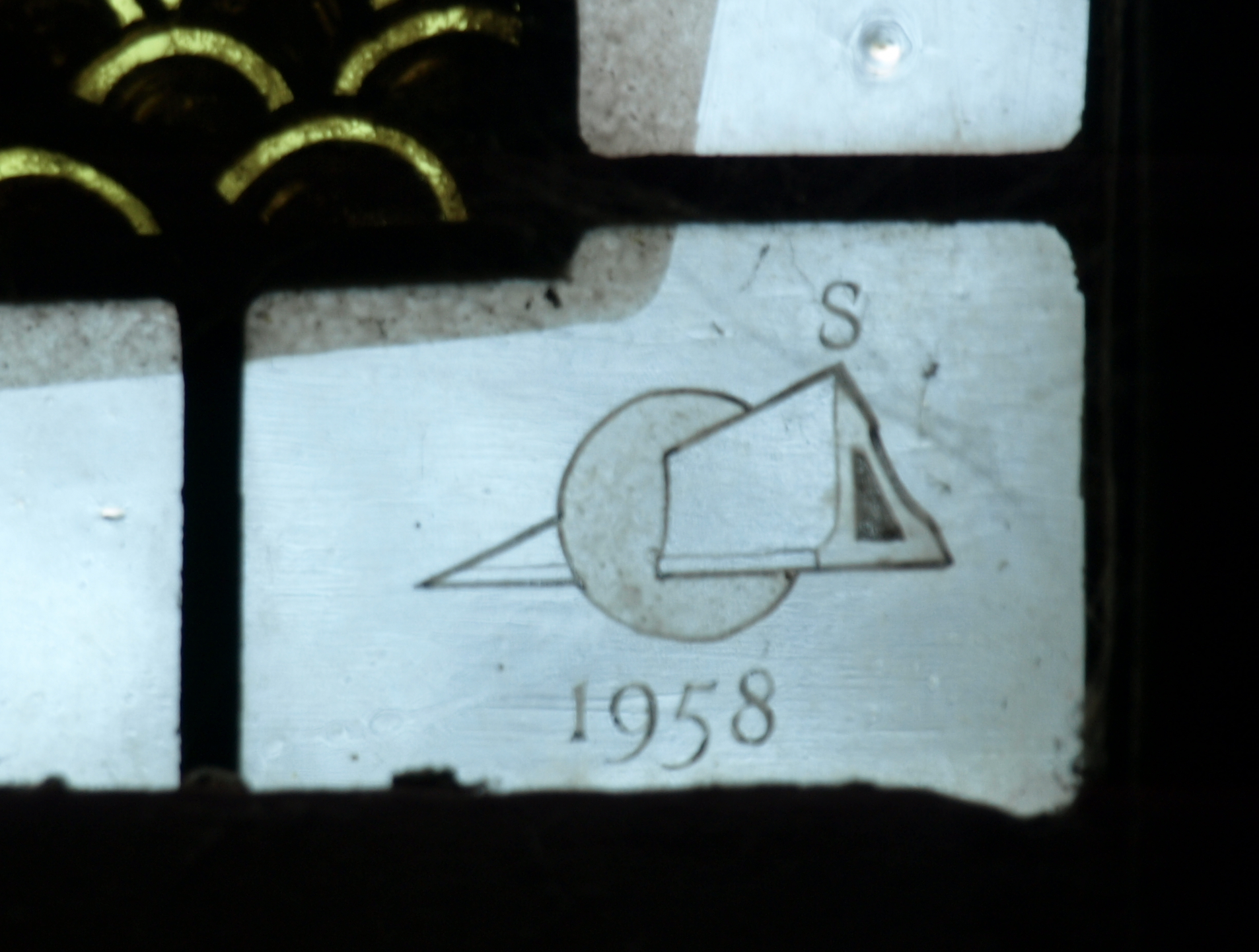
- Maker's mark of W. T. Carter Shapland
- Born: Willliam Thomas Carter Shapland; 3 February 1925; Devon, United Kingdom
- Died: 22 December 1972 (aged 47); Surbiton, London, United Kingdom
- Known for: Stained glass
- Notable work: Great West Window, Chester Cathedral
- Style: Figurative modernism
- Elected: Fellow of the British Society of Master Glass Painters

W. T. Carter Shapland (3 February 1925 – 22 December 1972) was a British stained glass artist and master glassmaker. A leading proponent of post-war trends in British stained glass, Shapland's independent work typified the figurative modernism and optimistic aesthetic associated with the Festival of Britain style, later moving towards architectural abstraction through his use of the dalle de verre technique. Examples of Shapland's work can be found across the south east of England, primarily in Church of England churches, though he also won commissions from across the UK and internationally.

== Early life and career ==
William Thomas Carter Shapland, known to his family as 'Tom', was born into a Devon farming family and raised at Sauls Farmhouse, Wembworthy. His rural upbringing informed his professional identity; he viewed his craft as a form of honest labour, akin to the farming traditions in which he was raised.

In 1940, aged 15, Shapland began a five-year apprenticeship in the design and manufacture of stained glass with the Exeter-based church furnishings firm J. Wippell & Co. Under the mentorship of Arthur Erridge, Shapland learned to produce glass in the Wippell signature style working on commissions for churches across Devon and beyond.

Sometime after end of the Second World War, having completed his apprenticeship at Whippell, Shapland moved to Brighton to take up an appointment as designer for the firm of Barton, Kinder and Alderson. Following the destruction of the Blitz, this was a productive period for British stained glass manufacturers given the widespread programme of church restoration that was underway, particularly in the south east of England. As a result, there was no shortage of commissions for Shapland to work on. His talent was recognised by the Worshipful Company of Glaziers and Painters of Glass when he won prizes recognising young talent in the British glassmaking industry in both 1951 and 1953.

== Independent studio ==
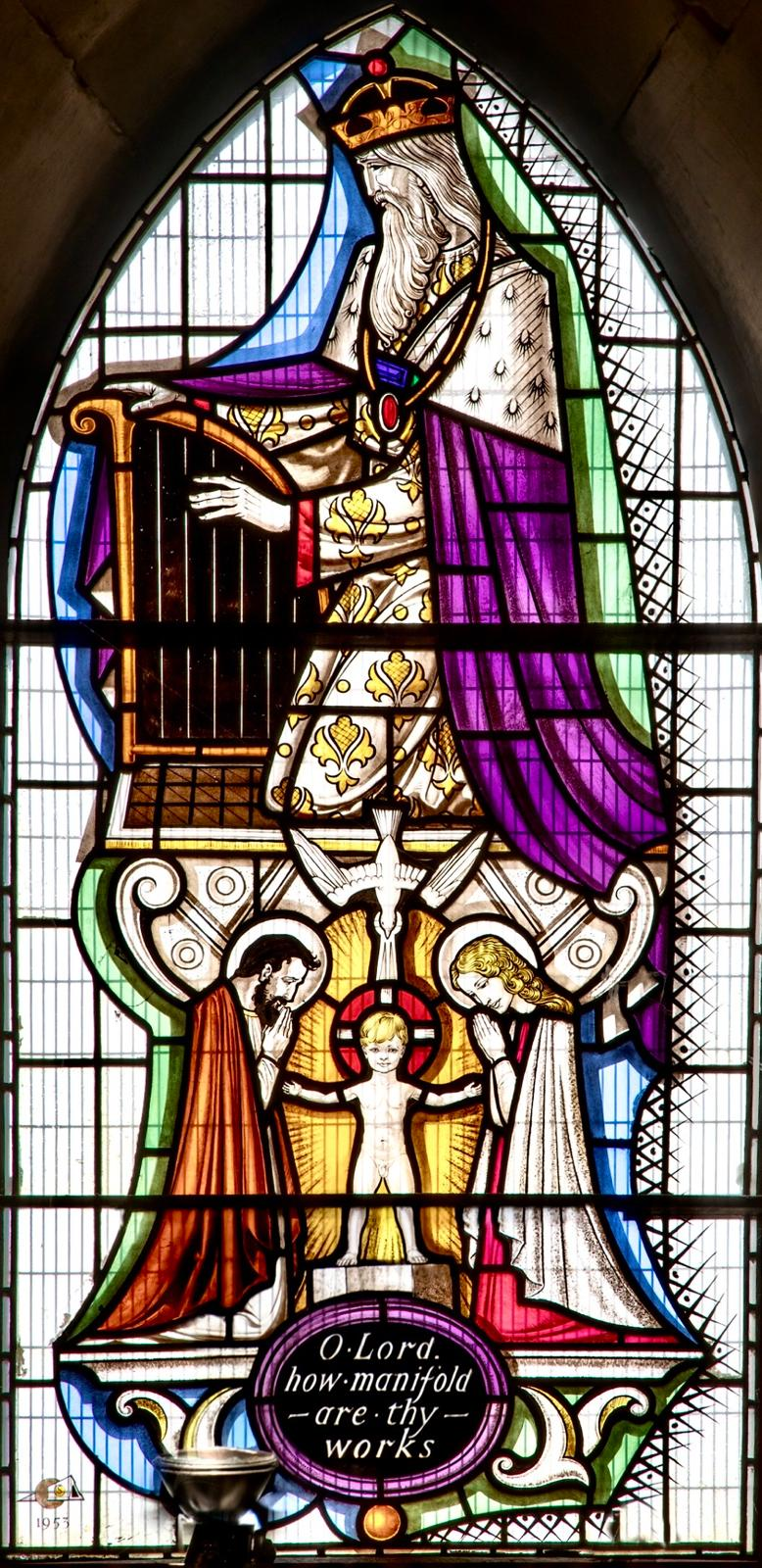
King David window, Southwark Cathedral (1953)

Influenced by emerging trends in modernism, particularly the style associated with the 1951 Festival of Britain, Shapland soon grew to feel that his creativity was being constrained by the traditional designs required by the house style of his employer. The recognition that came with winning prizes from the Worshipful Company of Glaziers provided Shapland with both the platform and confidence to move into freelance work.

In 1951, while still at Barton, Kinder and Anderson, Shapland married Wendy Leach of Surbiton. It was this connection that led to his relocation to the south-west London suburb around 1953, where he set up an independent studio at his new home. Here Shapland installed a kiln to allow him to manufacture glass according to his own designs. One of his early independent commissions was for Southwark Cathedral, a small window depicting King David playing a harp. While still traditional in technique, its style is identifiably modern. Shapland's chosen rebus, a stylised ploughshare piercing a disk, can be seen in the lower lefthand corner, above the date 1953.

As a freelance artist, Shapland developed a reputation for deep iconographic research. A collector of books on art, history, and ecclesiastics, he would spend extended periods of time researching the specific local saints and historical connections of a parish in order to incorporate them into his designs. This is in evidence in Shapland's three-light window for Peterborough Cathedral. Installed in 1958 it narrates part of the story of the cathedral itself, together with the theme of the triumph of good over evil.

== Evolution of style and technique ==
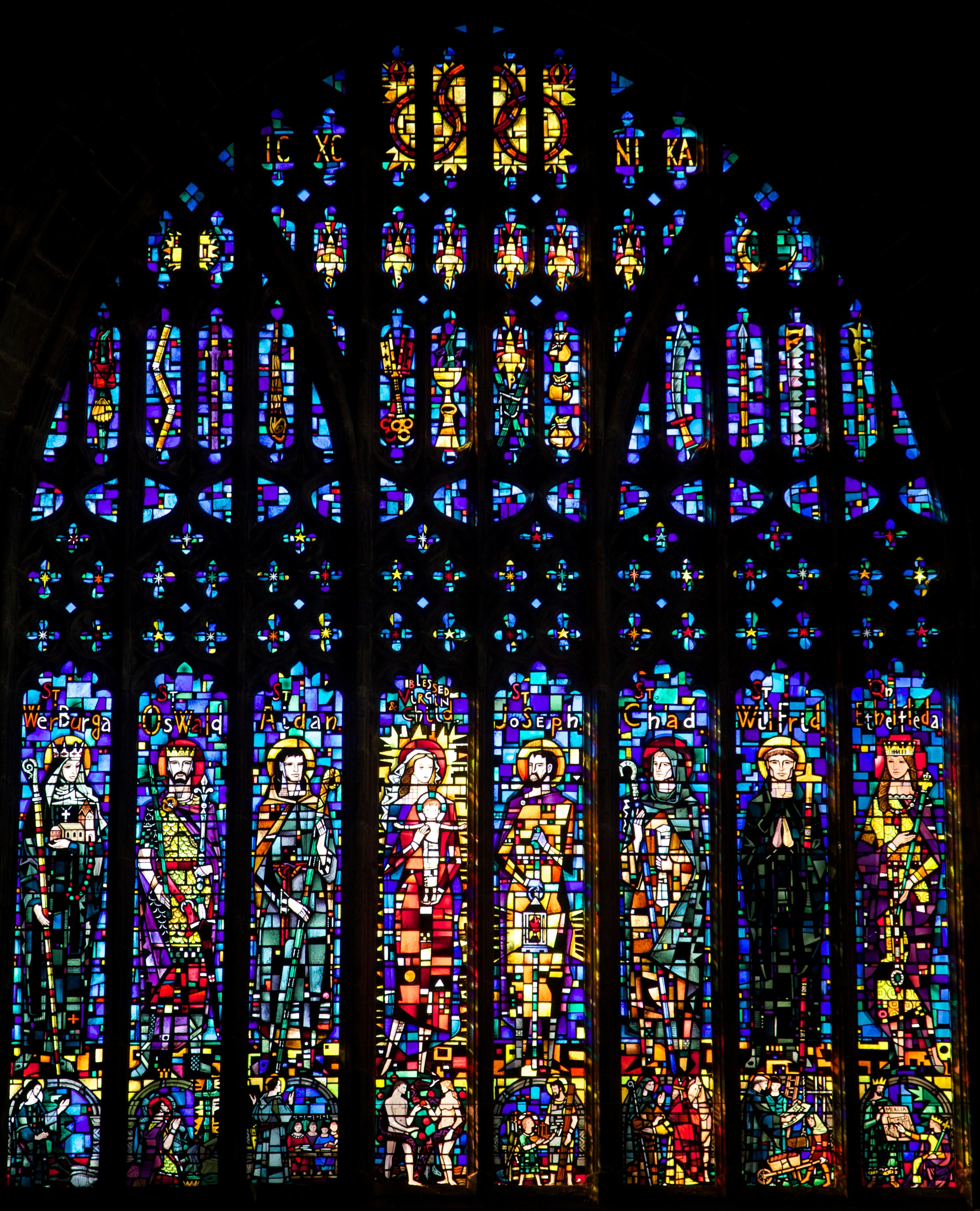
Great West Window, Chester Cathedral (1961)

Despite his relatively short career, Shapland's style and technique developed markedly over time. By the early 1960s his designs, while still figurative, began to take on a more geometric and linear form. Evidence for this can be seen in the figures in Shapland's 1960 window for New Church of St Mary in Stoke Newington. The lower sections of the window are particularly distinctive, depicting ephemera associated with science, engineering, and technology, including fossils, constellations, scientific instruments, chemical elements, a steam engine, nuclear reactor and the Jodrell Bank telescope.

Shapland's commission for the Great West Window of Chester Cathedral was among his most important, both in terms of prominence and the evolution of his style. Unveiled in 1961, it depicts the Holy Family with the northern saints Werburgh, Oswald, Aidan, Chad, Wilfrid, and Ethelfleda across the lower eight lights. While traditional in its iconography, Shapland departed from his prior practice of leaving large areas of a window clear-glazed, resulting in an intensity of colour previously unseen in his works, enhanced by the monumentality of the window itself.

Similar in style is Shapland's east window for the Church of St George in Coundon, Coventry, this time in the more modern setting of Nugent Cachemaille-Day's modern brick-built building. Dedicated in 1965, the window takes the theme of the Redemption of Mankind, with the Risen Christ triumphant in the centre light.

== Late works ==
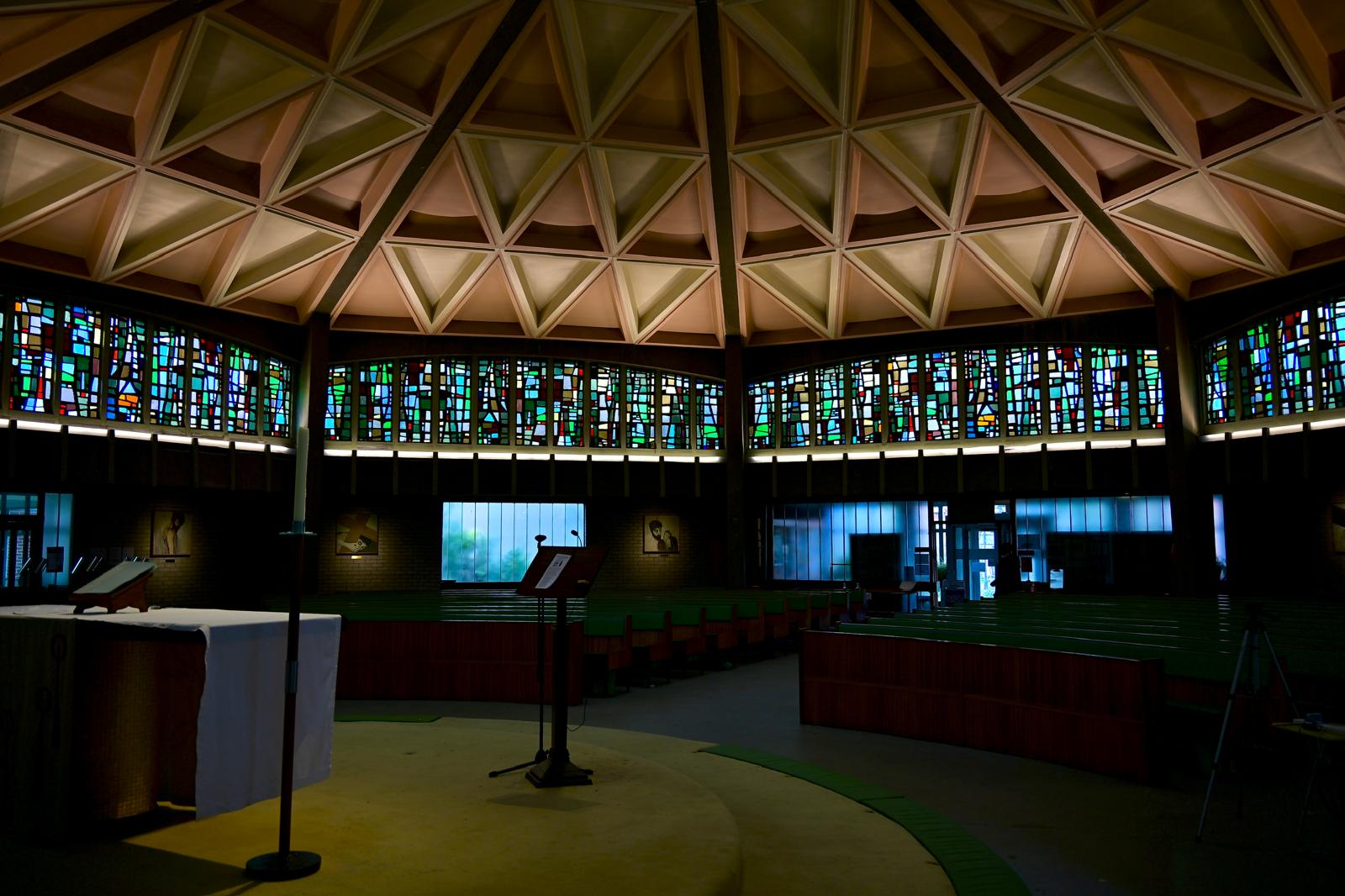
St Laurence's Church, Catford (1968)

In the mid-1960s Shapland began to experiment with the dalle de verre technique that had been introduced to the United Kingdom from France by Pierre Fourmaintraux. While Shapland never fully redirected his output to this method in the manner of its greatest proponent in the UK, Dom Charles Norris, he thought the technique to be particularly suited to commissions for newly built churches in which his glass would be structurally integral to the architecture of the building.

Three important examples of Shapland's work in this style, in which thick slabs of glass are set into a matrix of concrete or epoxy resin, came as a result of Shapland's collaboration with the architect Ralph Covell. Three of Covell's new churches for London, St Katharine in Bermondsey (c. 1966), William Temple Church in Abbey Wood (also 1966) and St Laurence, Catford (1968) were all glazed in this style by Shapland. His approach to dalle de verre was itself novel. Many practitioners of the technique intentionally faceted the face of the glass slabs to create a sparkling, jewel-like effect. Shapland would leave the glass unfaceted for a more clear, uniform effect. At St Laurence in Catford there is also an illuminated Greek Cross positioned on the east wall behind the main altar. Made from shards of thick glass embedded end-on into the cruciform-shaped frame, while its maker is not definitively confirmed, the material and colours correspond closely to Shapland's other works in the church and it may also be attributable to him.

Among Shapland's final works was a window for his local church, St Matthew in Surbiton. A triple window, is depicts a uniformed nurse of Surbiton hospital in the left light, with Jesus performing the miracle of feeding the multitude to the centre. It was dedicated in 1970 in memory of Bobs and Marjorie Capcorn.

== Death ==
On 22 December 1972, Shapland and his wife Wendy were Christmas shopping in Surbiton. The couple went to separate shops and upon returning to the car Wendy found her husband in the driver’s seat unresponsive. Shapland suffered a fatal heart attack at the age of 47, his premature death cutting short a career in full flow.

== Selected works ==
- Southwark Cathedral
  - South choir aisle - King David playing the harp (1953)
- St Alban's Church, Mottingham
  - West window - Seven panels showing Christ on the Cross with the Virgin Mary and saints Alban, John the Divine and Andrew (1953)
- St George's Church, Battersea
  - Five reset panels from previous church - scenes from The Pilgrim's Progress, Christ and saints (1956)
- St Peter's Church, Kington Langley
  - South nave - Healing of the centurion's servant (1957)
- Holy Trinity Church, Eltham
  - Gallipoli chapel - Chris in Majesty with the Virgin Mary and St Agnes (1957)
  - South aisle - St Catherine and St Cecilia (1959)
- Peterborough Cathedral
  - South transept, saints Dunstan, Benedict and Ethelwold (1958)
- St Etheldreda's Church, Fulham
  - Baptistry - 11 panels depicting scenes from the Life of Christ (1958)
- St John the Baptist's Church, Southend, Catford
  - South chapel - Visitation, Baptism, Beheading of St John the Baptist (1958)
- St Nicholas' Church, Codsall
  - South aisle - Confirmation, Jacob blessing (1958)
- Church of the Ascension, Wembley
  - South chapel - four abstract panels (1959)
  - North east chapel - St Michael defeating the Devil (1959)
  - North west chapel - St Anselm (c.1961)
- St John the Divine's Church, Kennington
  - Apse windows - Three two-light windows with scenes from the Life of Christ and the Book of Revelation (1959)
  - South-east chapel - Christ is revealed in Glory (1962)
- St Mary's Church, Compton Abbas
  - West window - Ascension (1959)
- St Michael and All Angels' Church, Beddington
  - South aisle - Nativity, Christ in the House of Mary and Martha, Mocking of Christ, Christ in Majesty (1959)
- St John the Evangelist's Church, Elkstone
  - West window - six scenes depicting local worthies (1959)
  - South chancel - John the Baptist (1959)
- St Mary's Church, Stoke Newington
  - North transept - Te Deum window with ephemera associated with science, engineering, and technology (1960)
- St Mark's Church, Surbiton
  - West window - Apostles with holy sacraments (1960)
  - North aisle - St George (1960)
  - South aisle - Abstract on theme of Holy Trinity (1963)
- All Saints' Church, Warlingham
  - South aisle - Holy Family (1960)
- Chester Cathedral
  - Great West Window - Holy Family with northern saints (1961)
- St Matthew's Church, Clapton
  - North nave - three reset panels from previous church, St Martin, St George, Madonna and Child, Samuel (1964)
- St George's Church, Coundon, Coventry
  - East window - Redemption of Mankind (1965)
- St Katherine's Church, Bermondsey
  - Nave - eight two-light dalle de verre windows with abstract design (c.1966)
  - West wall - two-light dalle de verre window with abstract design (c.1966)
- William Temple Church, Abbey Wood
  - Nave - two dalle de verre windows with abstract design (1966)
- St Lawrence's Church, Catford
  - Seven 12ft, 11-light dalle de verre panels with abstract design (1968)
  - Illuminated glass crucifix over altar (1968) - attributed
- Christ Church, Shooters Hill
  - South nave - Annunciation (1969)
  - South nave - St Luke the Evangelist (1972)
- St Mary's Church, Merton
  - North chapel - Annunciation (1970)
- Christ's Chapel of Alleyns College of God's Gift, Dulwich
  - North nave - Instruments of the Passion (1970)
- St Matthew's Church, Surbiton
  - South aisle - Feeding the multitude (1970)

== Gallery ==
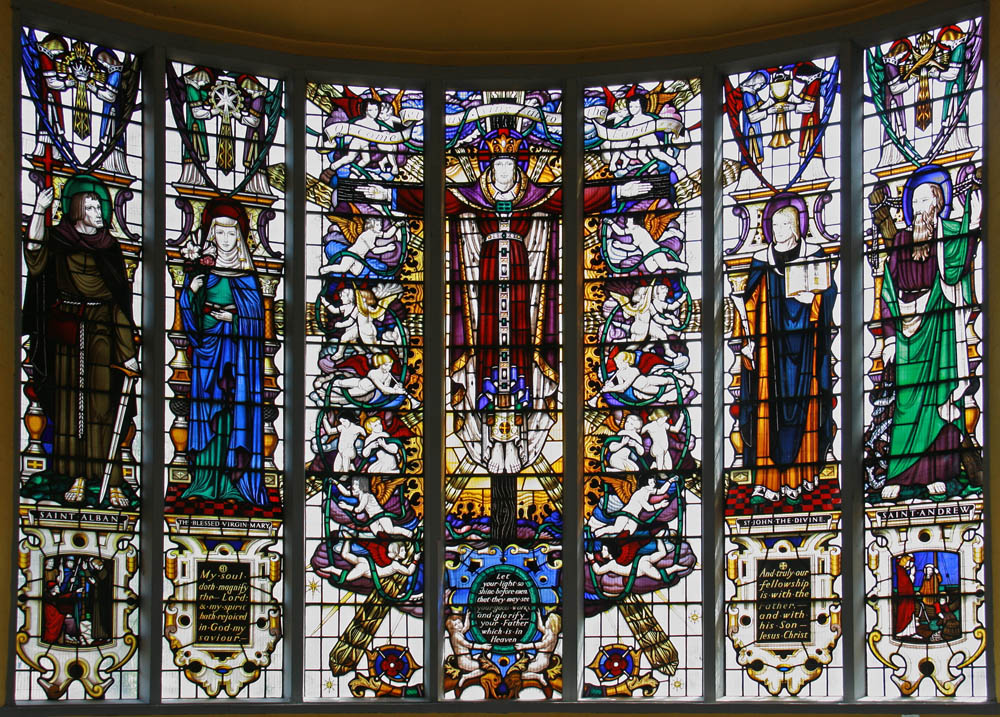
St Alban's Church, Mottingham

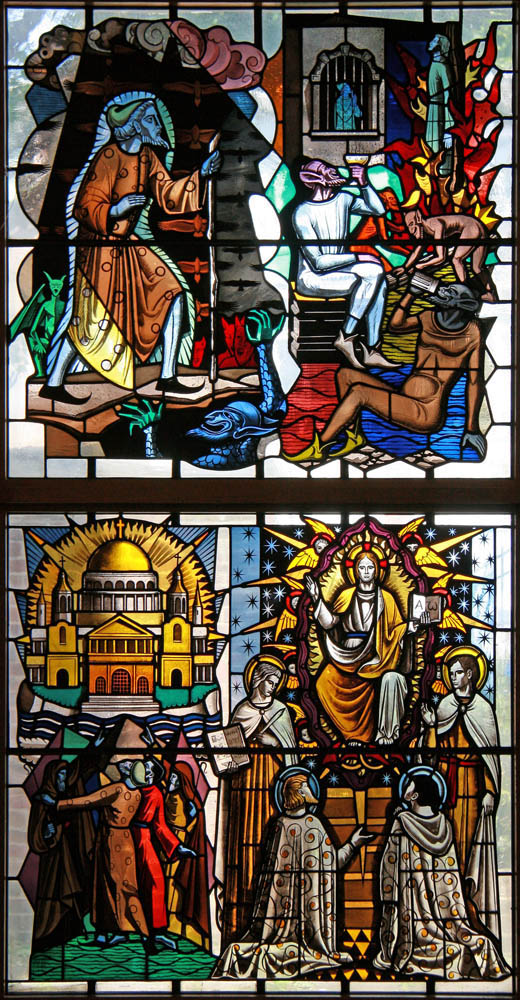
St George's Church, Battersea

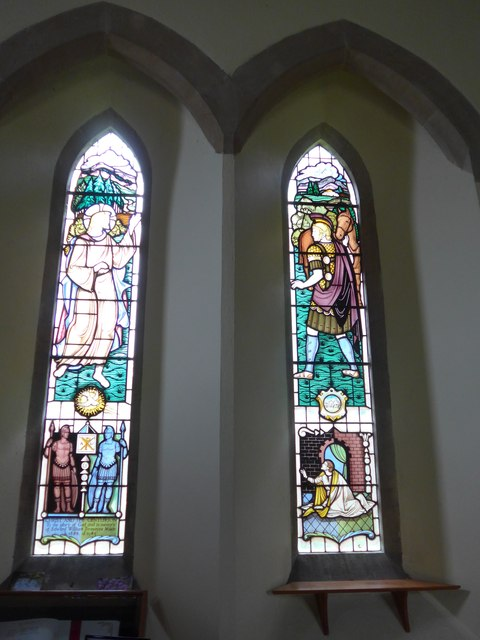
St Peter's Church, Kington Langley

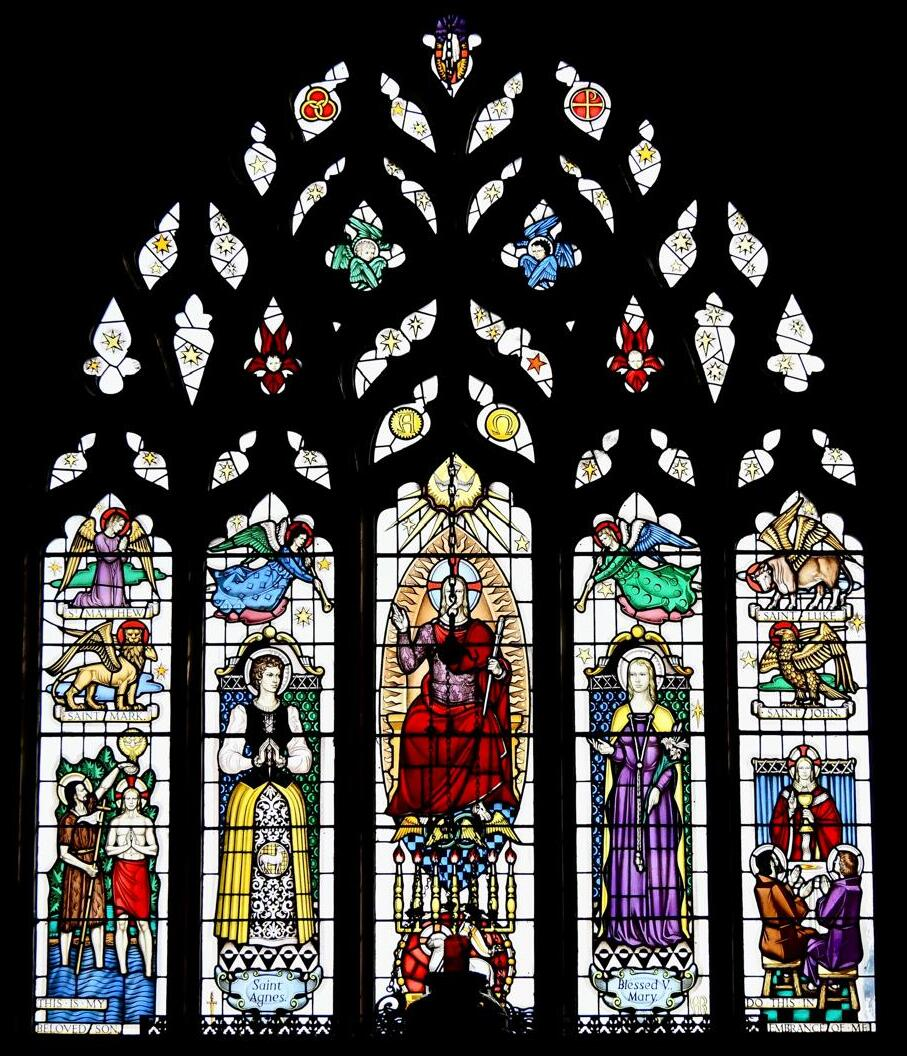
Holy Trinity, Eltham (1)

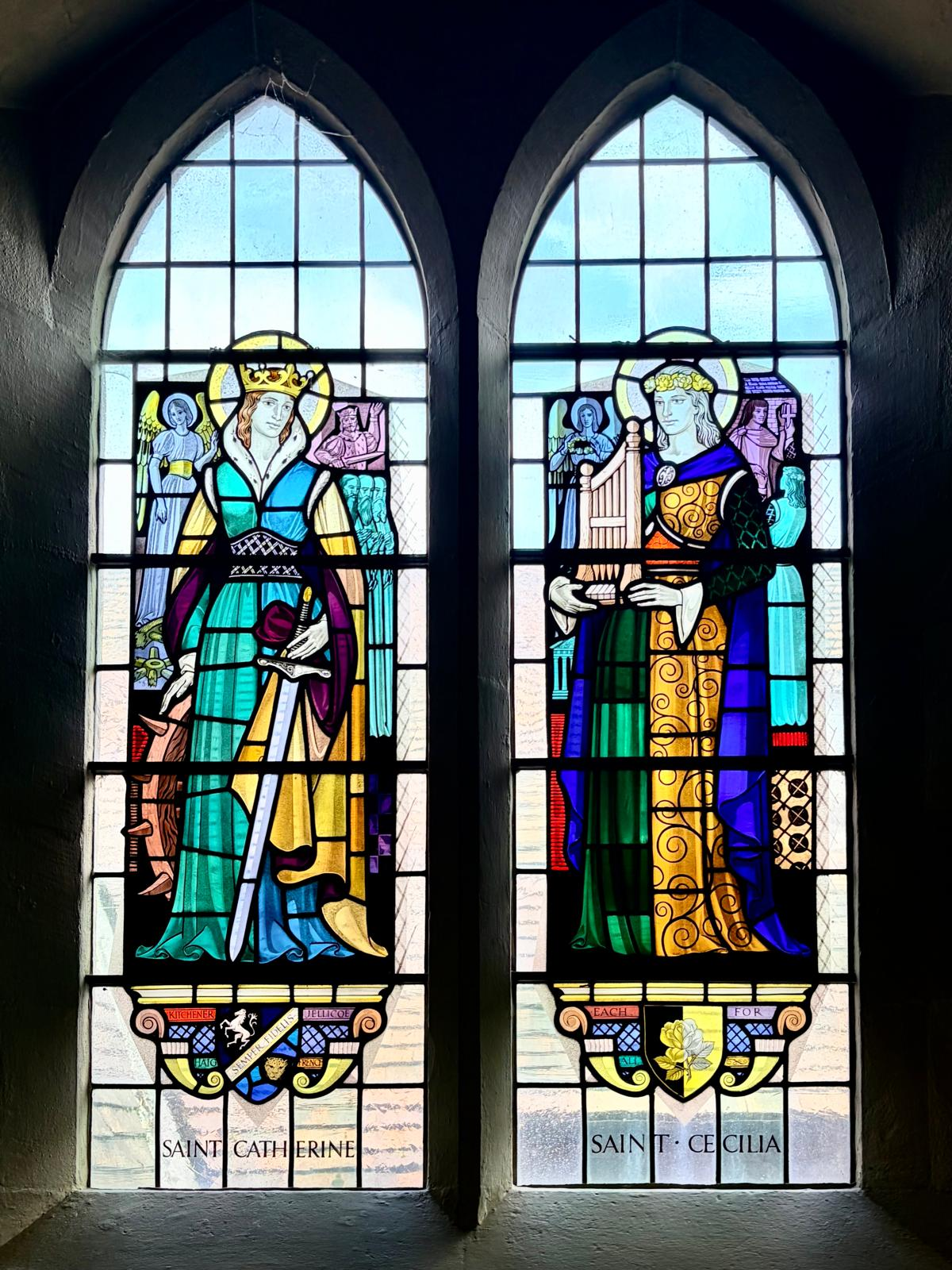
Holy Trinity, Eltham (2)

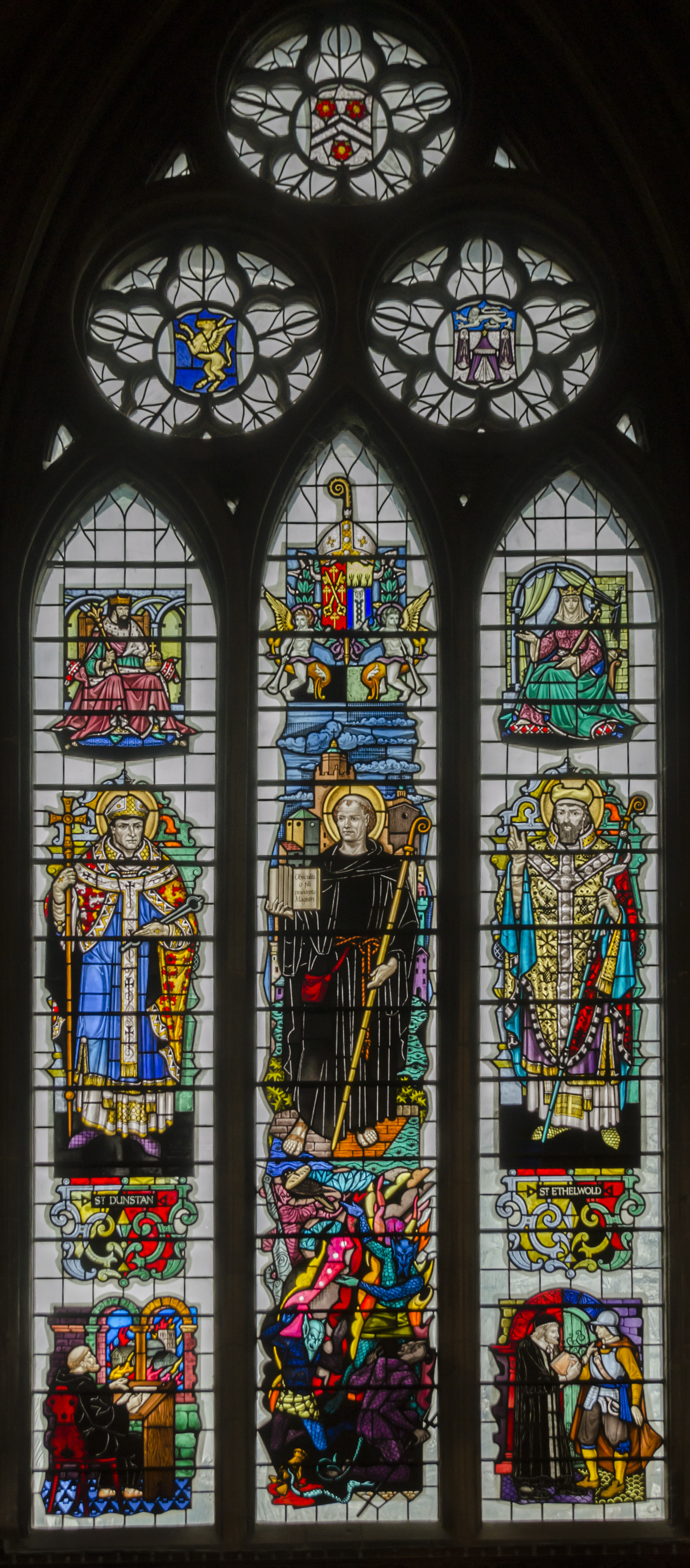
Peterborough Cathedral

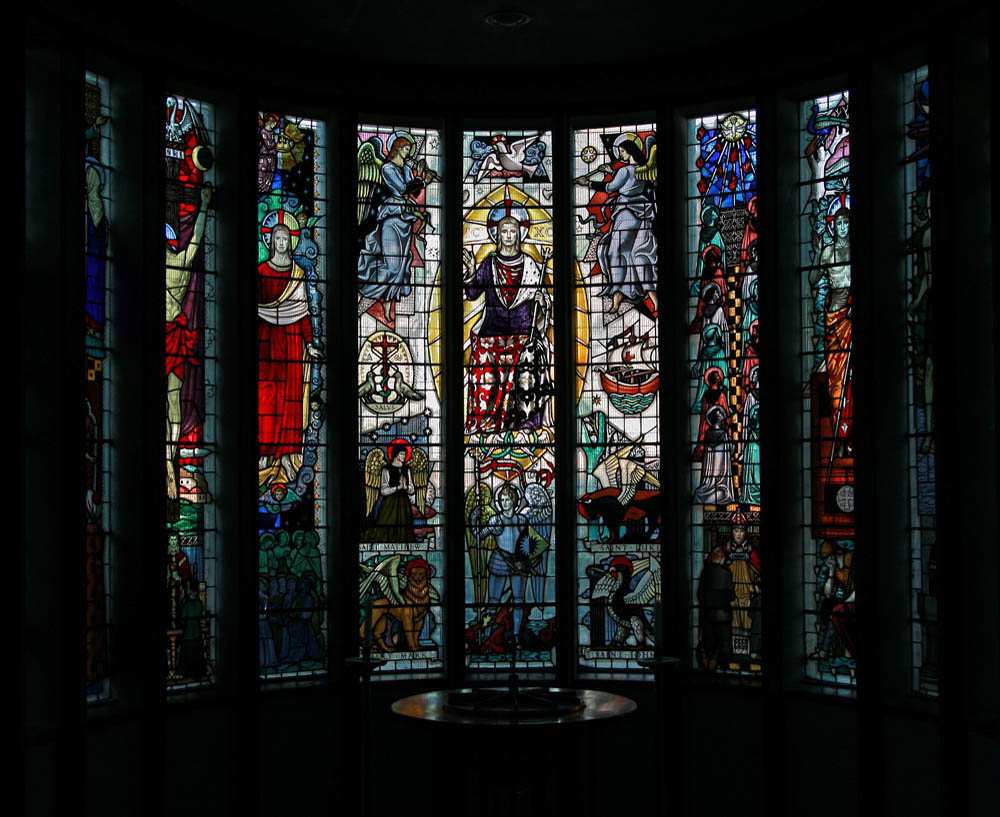
St Eltheldreda's Church, Fulham

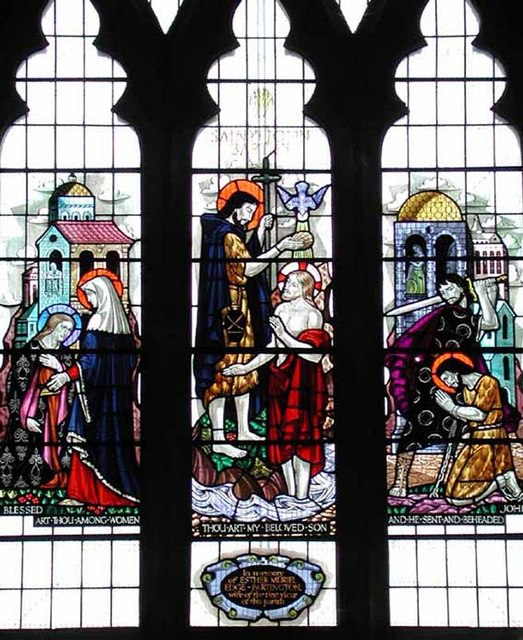
St John the Baptist's Church, Southend, Catford

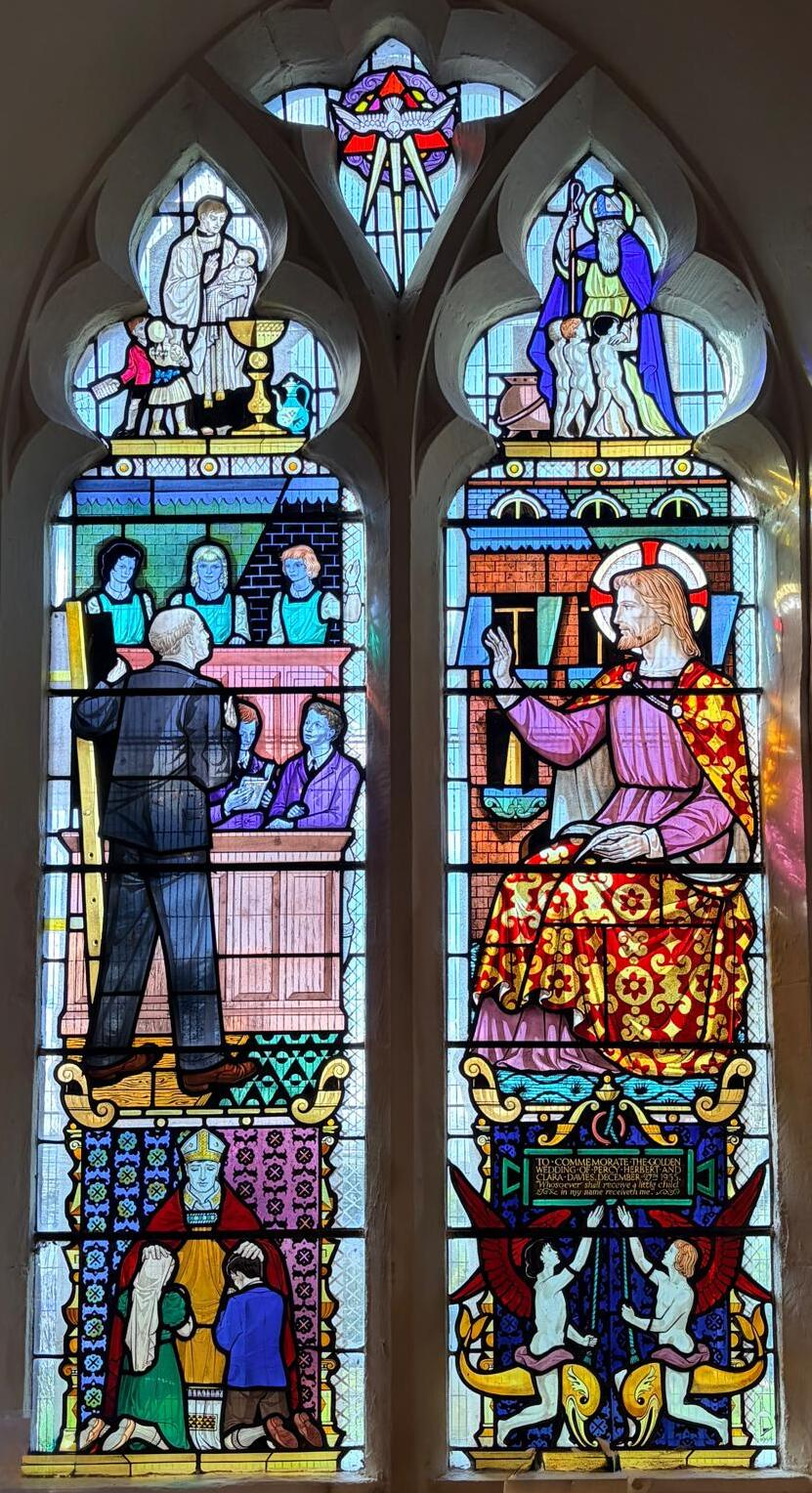
St Nicholas's Church, Codsall

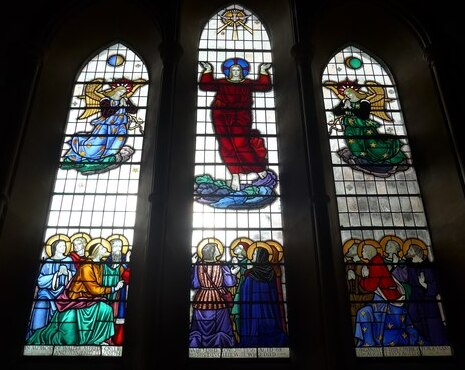
St Mary's Church, Compton Abbas

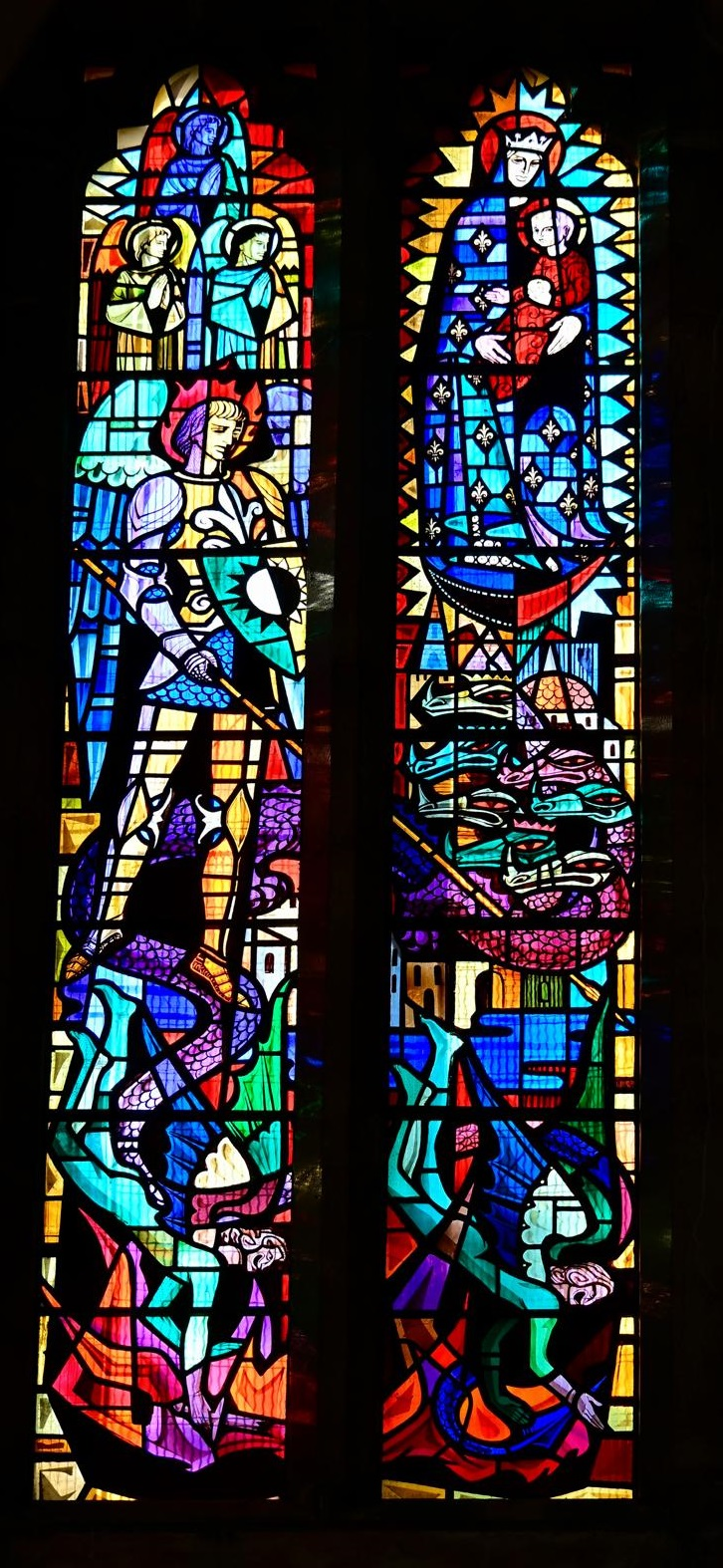
Church of the Ascension, Wembley Park (1)

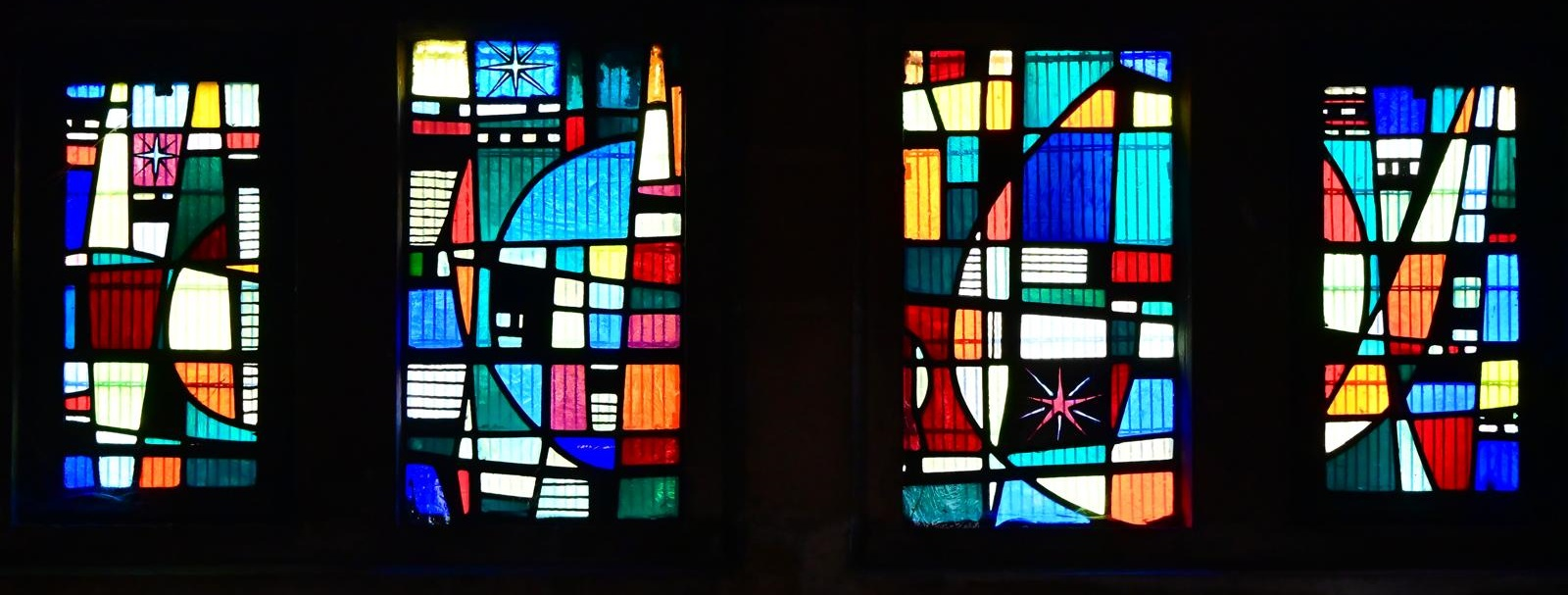
Church of the Ascension, Wembley Park (2)

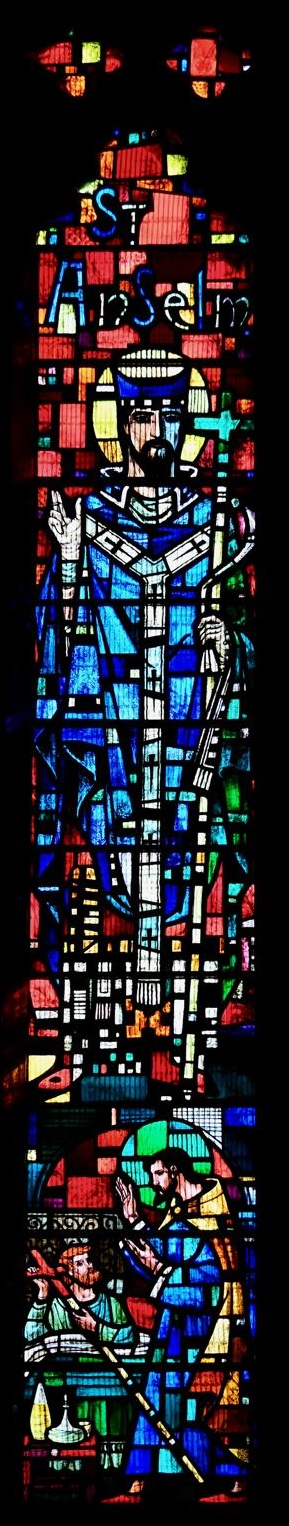
Church of the Ascension, Wembley Park (3)

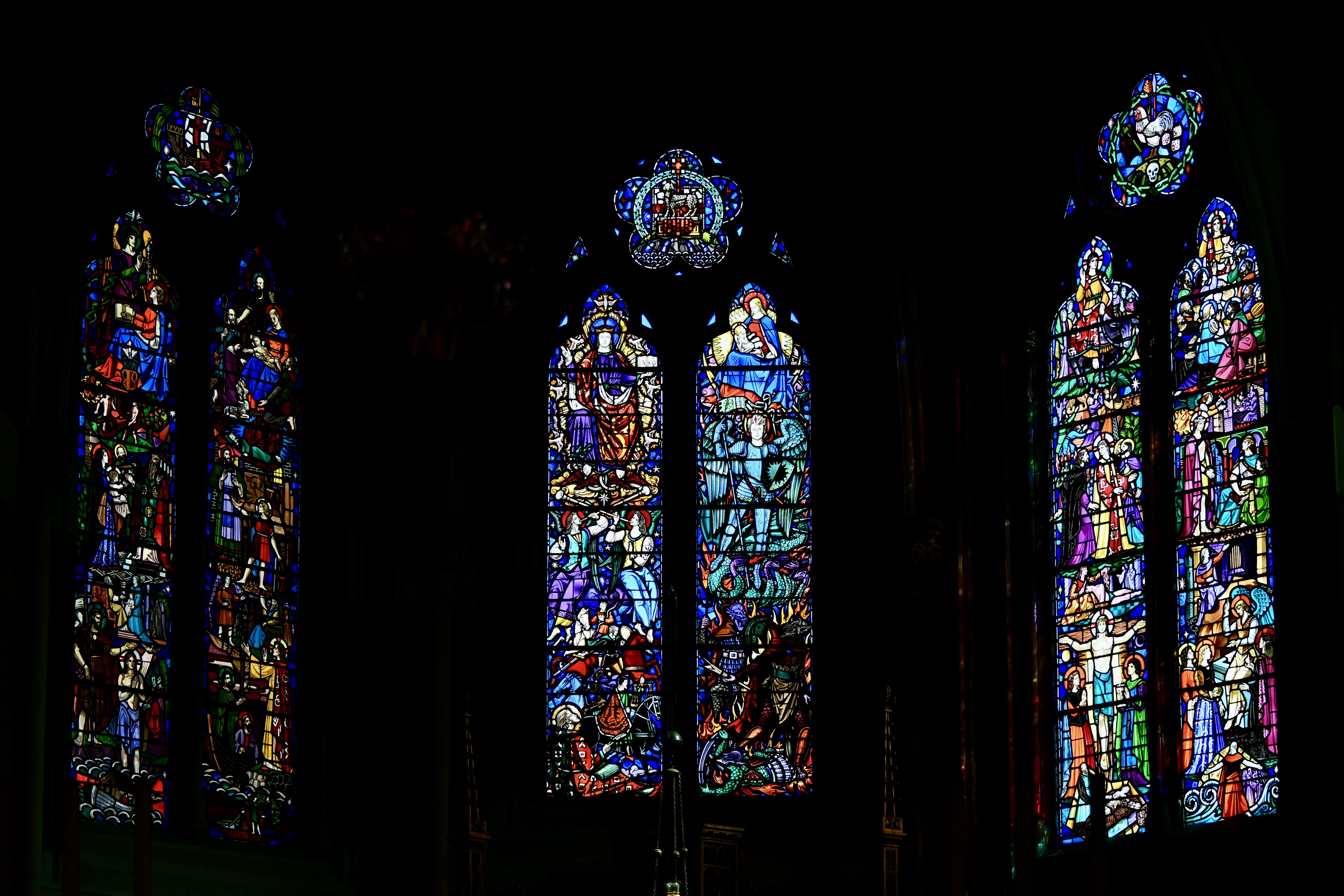
Church of St John the Divine, Kennington (1)

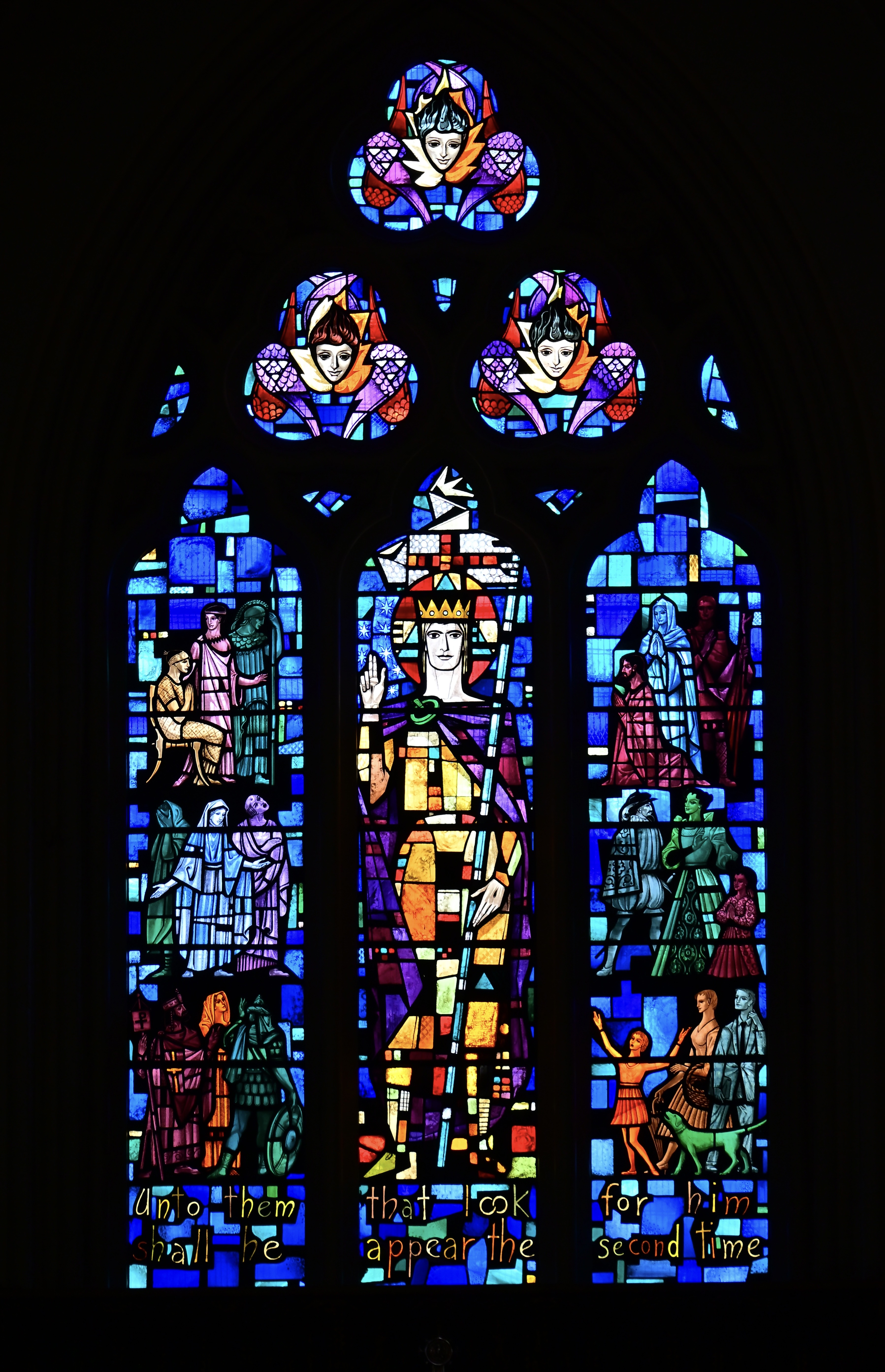
Church of St John the Divine, Kennington (2)

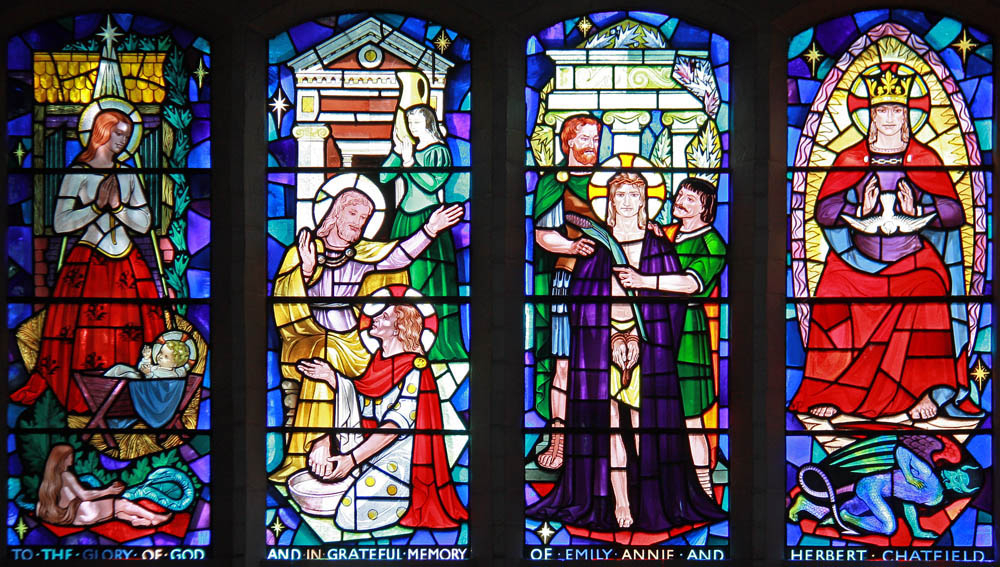
St Michael and All Angels' Church, Beddington

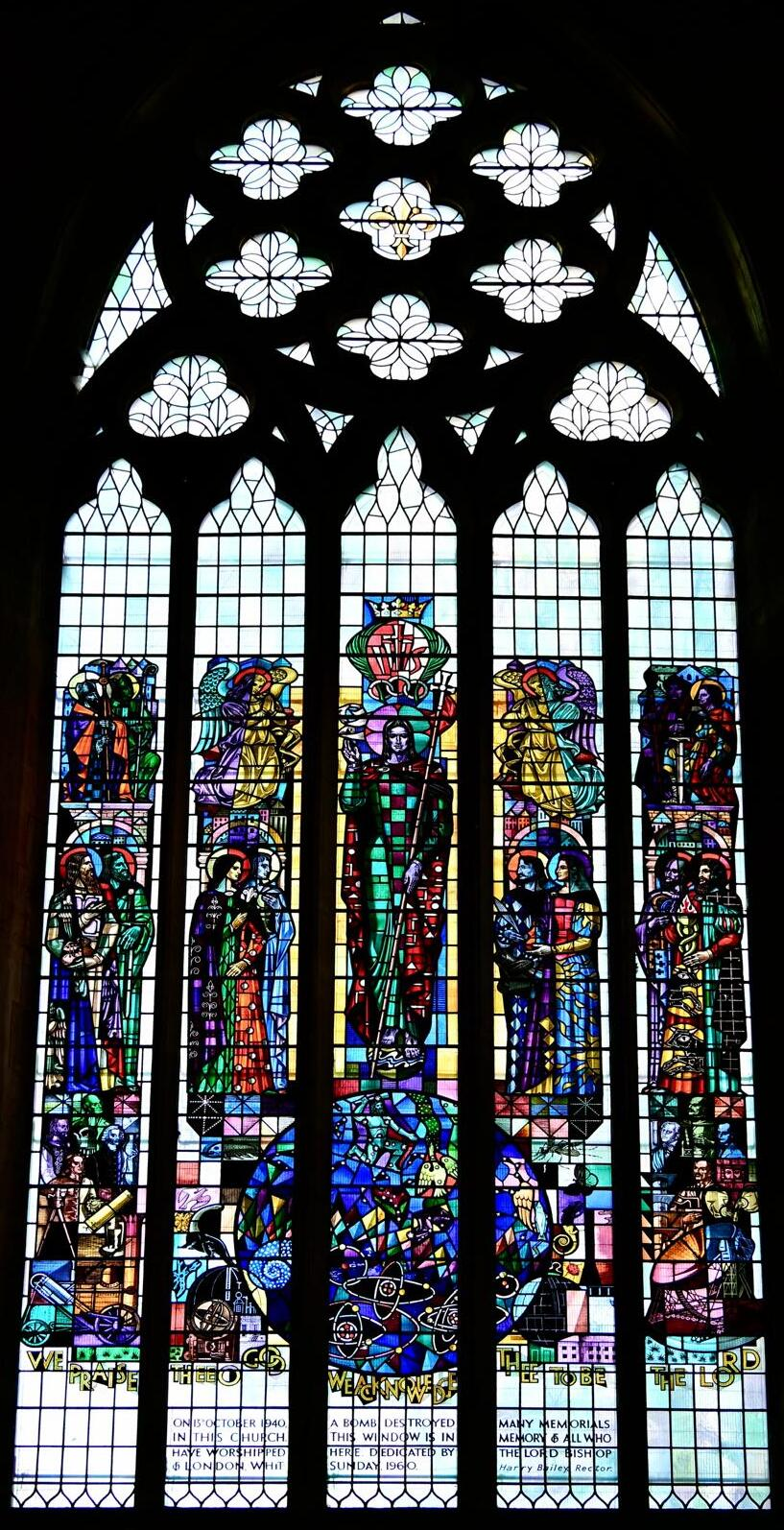
St Mary's Church, Stoke Newington

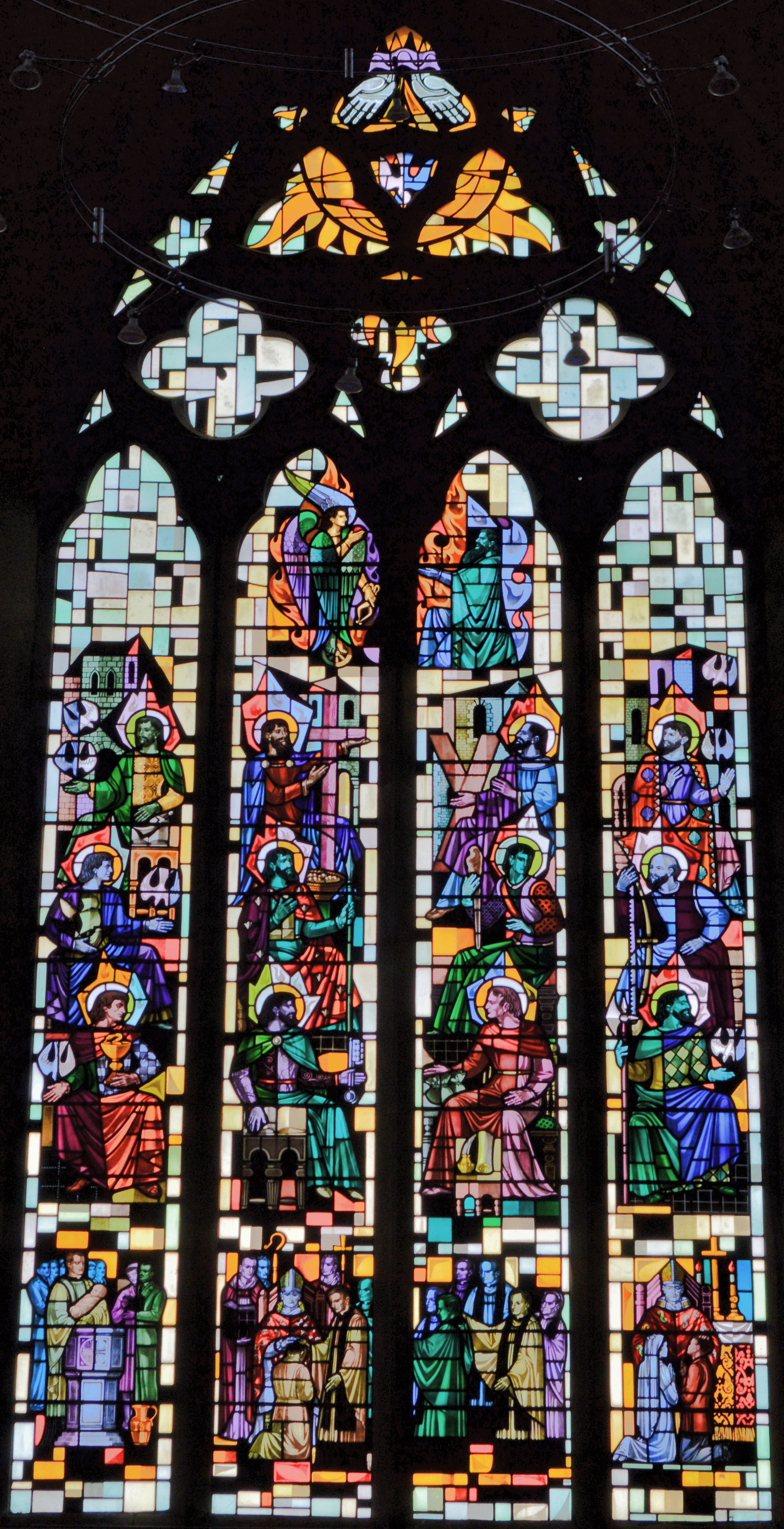
St Mark's Church, Surbiton (1)

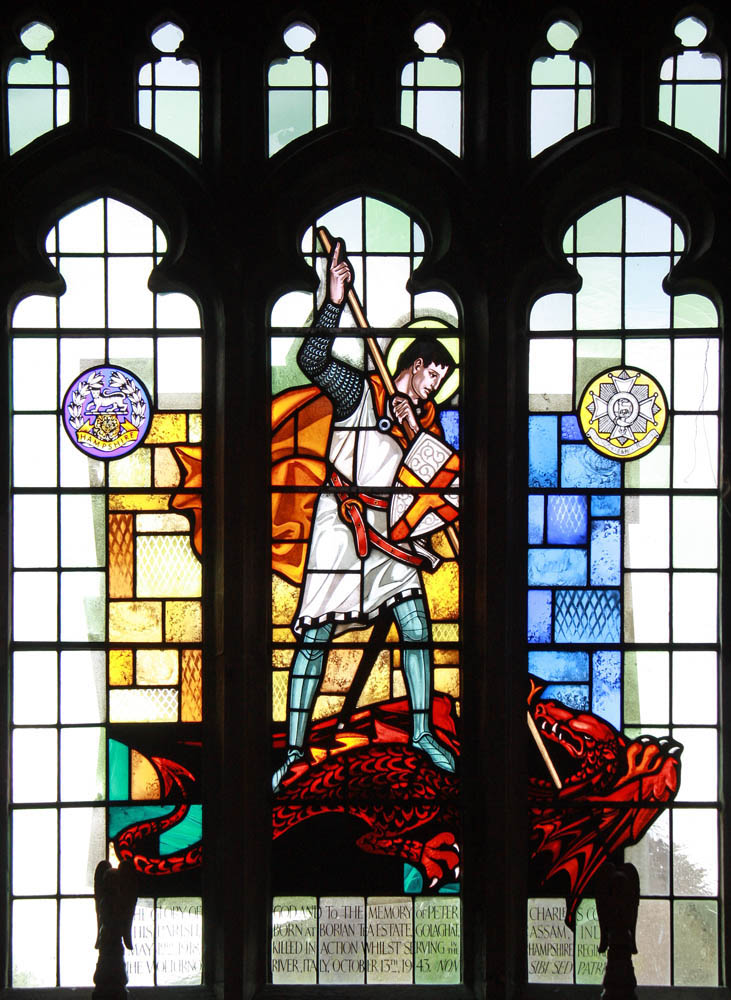
St Mark's Church, Surbiton (2)

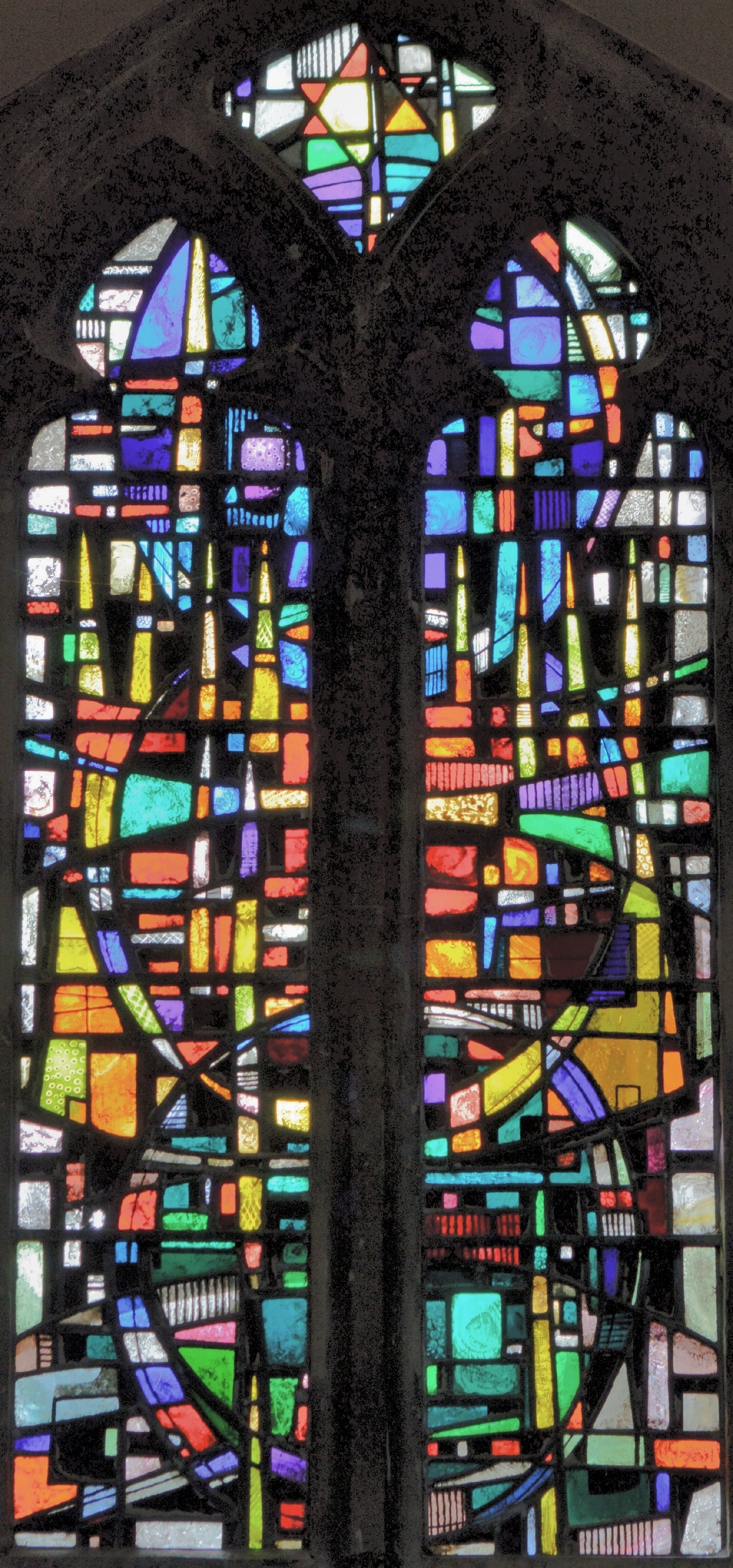
St Mark's Church, Surbiton (3)

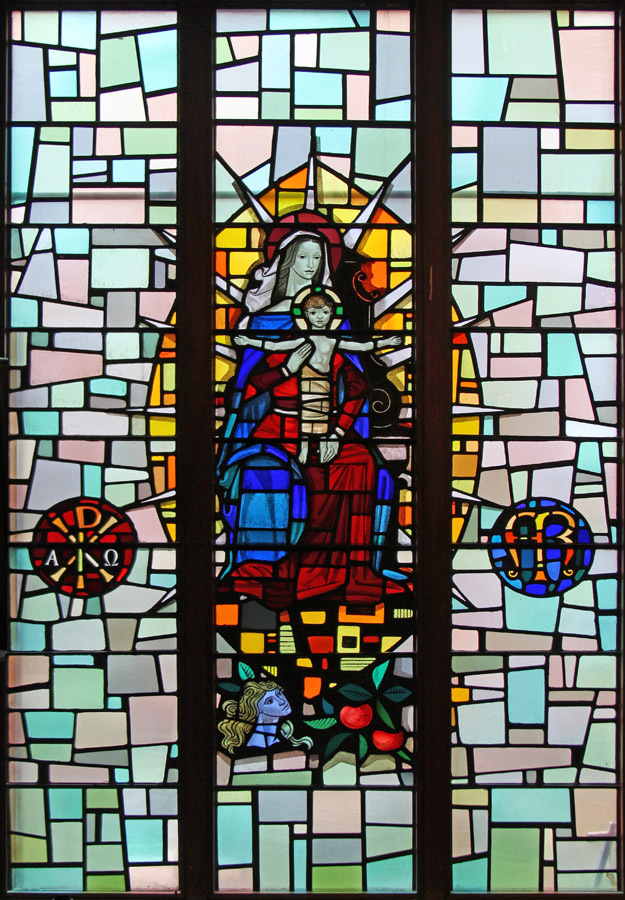
St Matthew's Church, Clapton

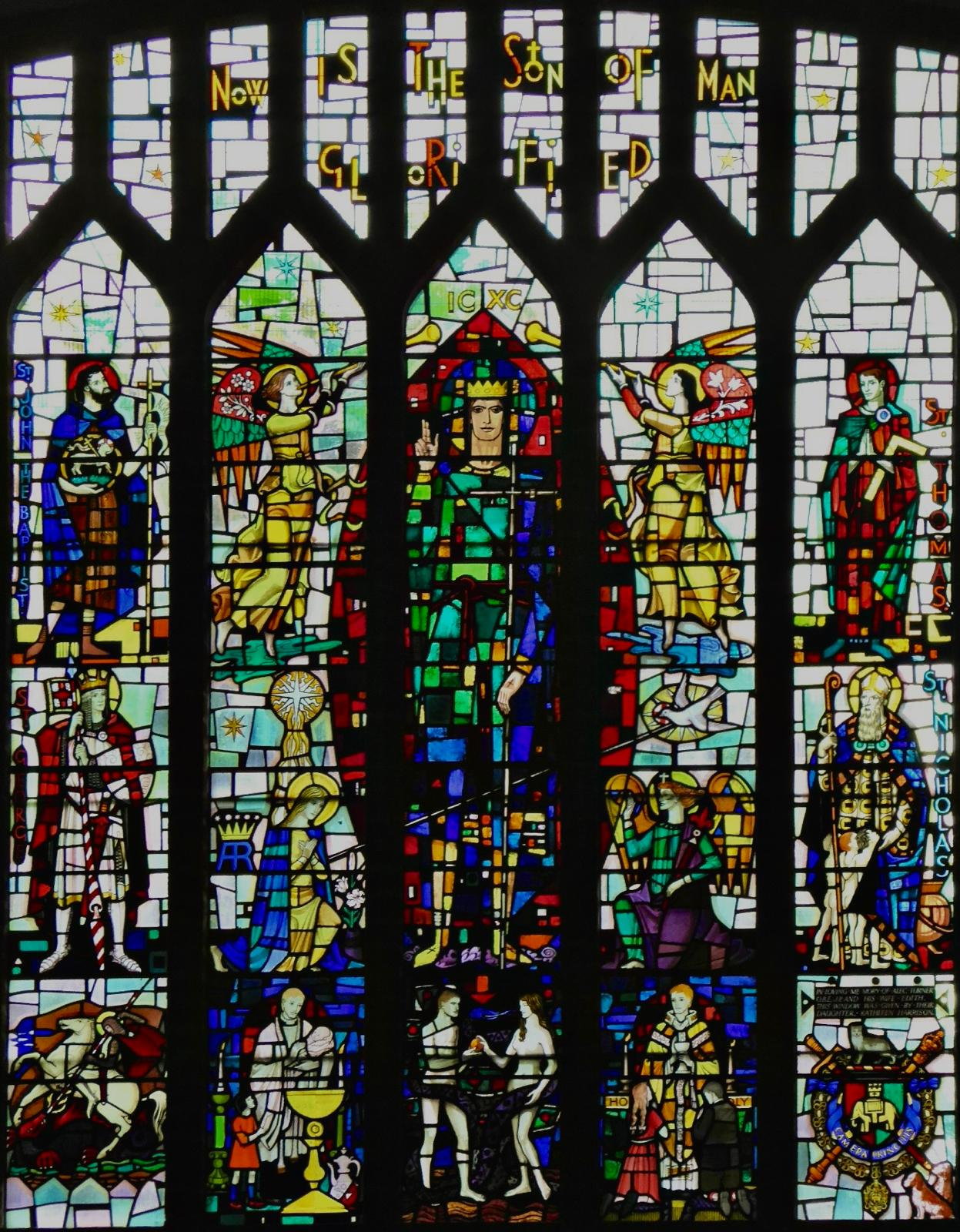
St George's Church, Coundon, Coventry

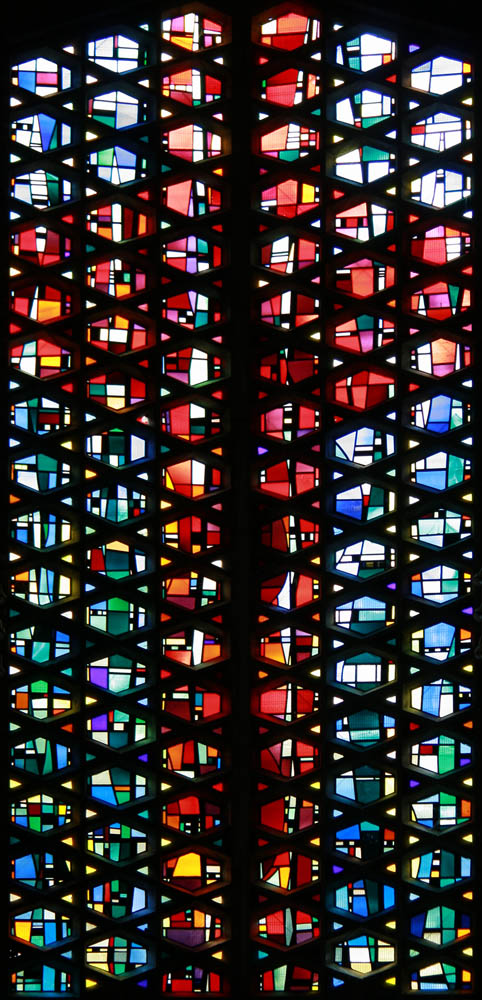
St Katharine's Church Bermondsey

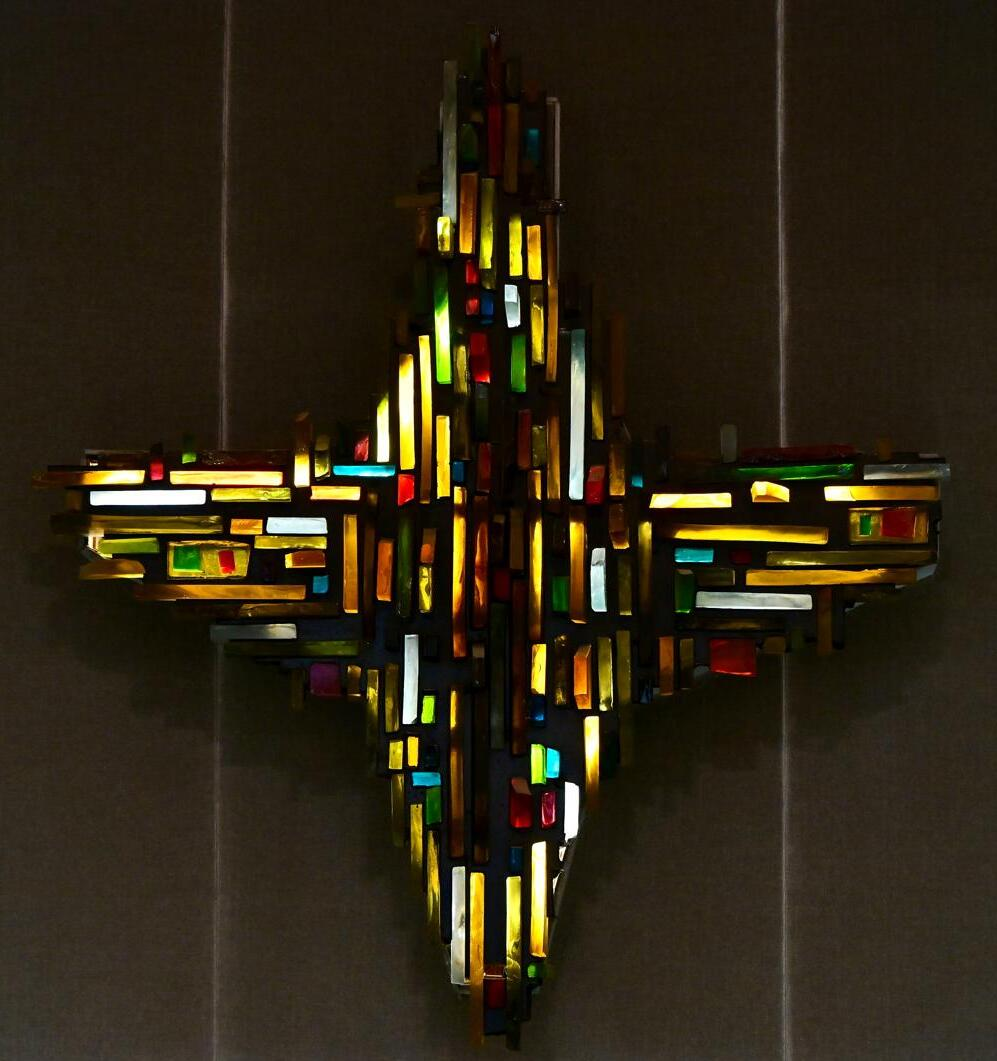
Illuminated glass crucifix in St Laurence's Church, Catford

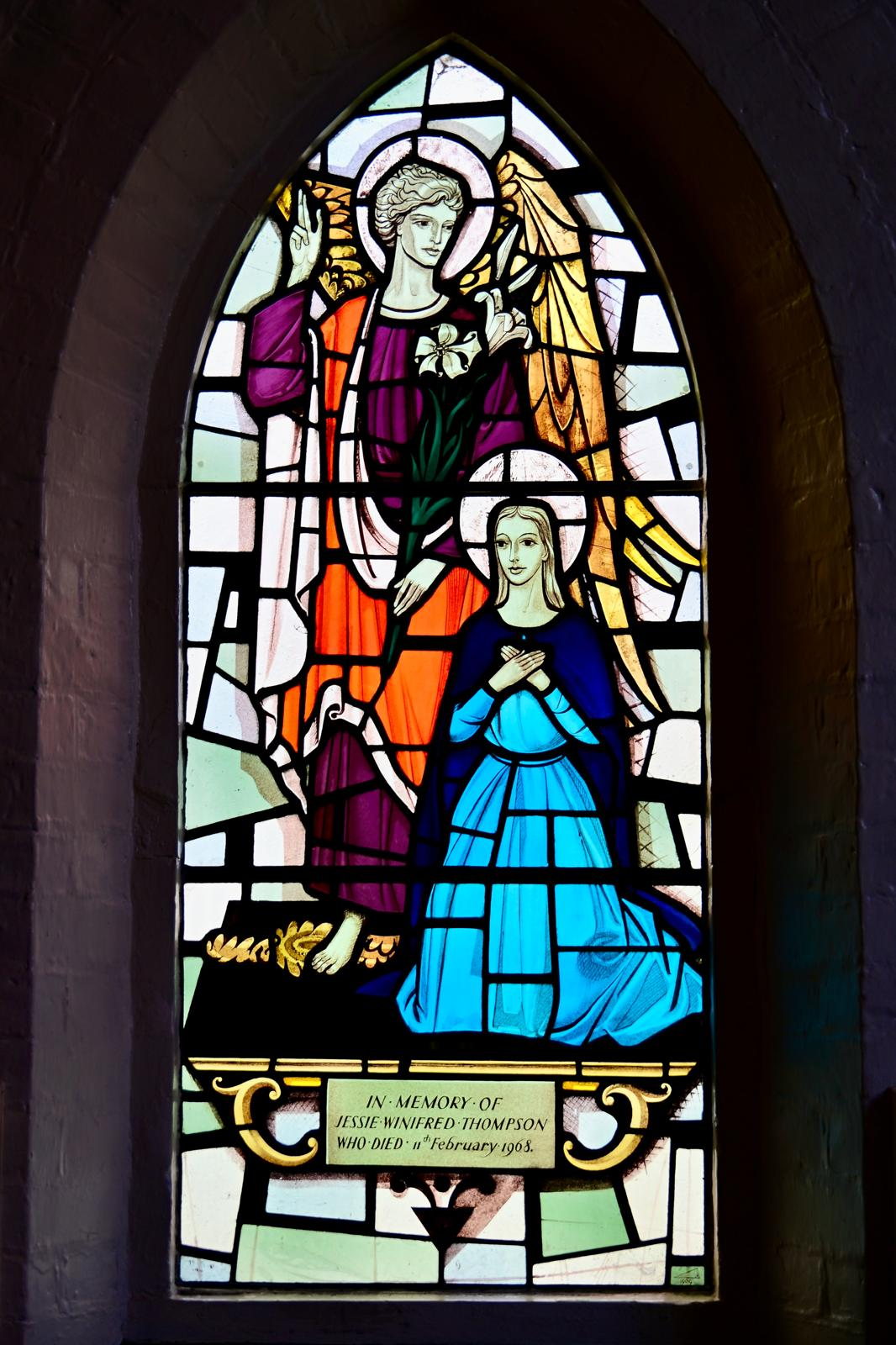
Christ Church, Shooters Hill (1)

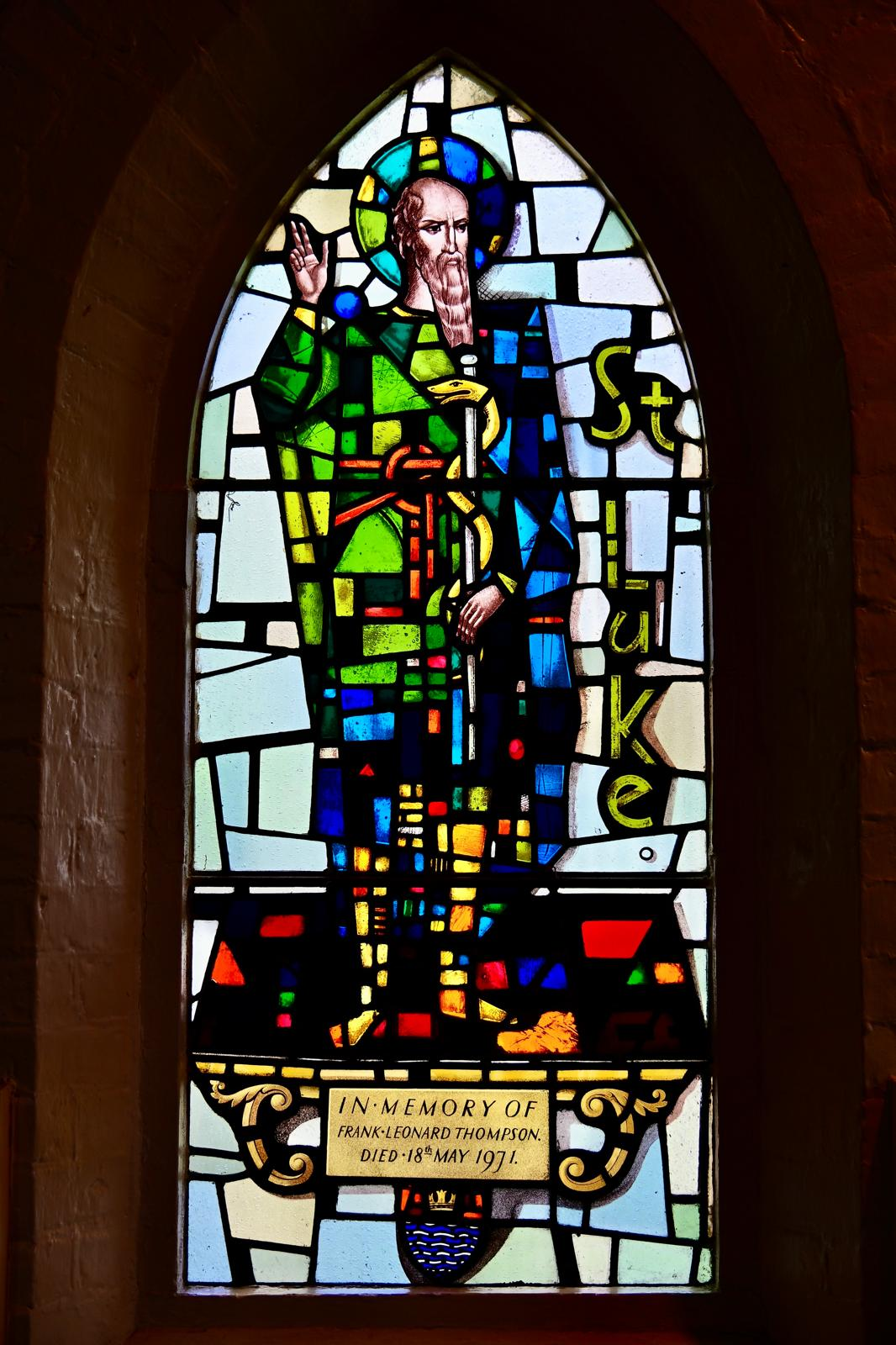
Christ Church Shooters Hill (2)

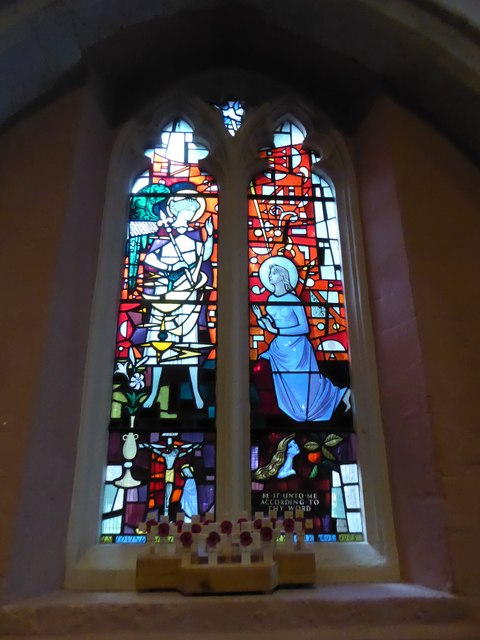
St Mary's Church, Merton

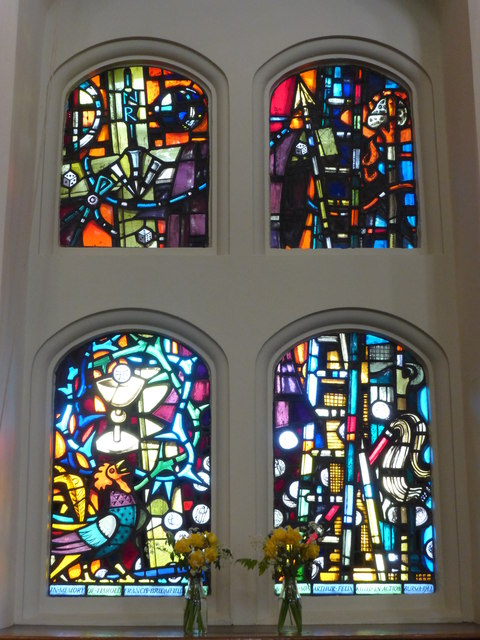
Christ's Chapel Of Alleyns College Of God's Gift, Dulwich

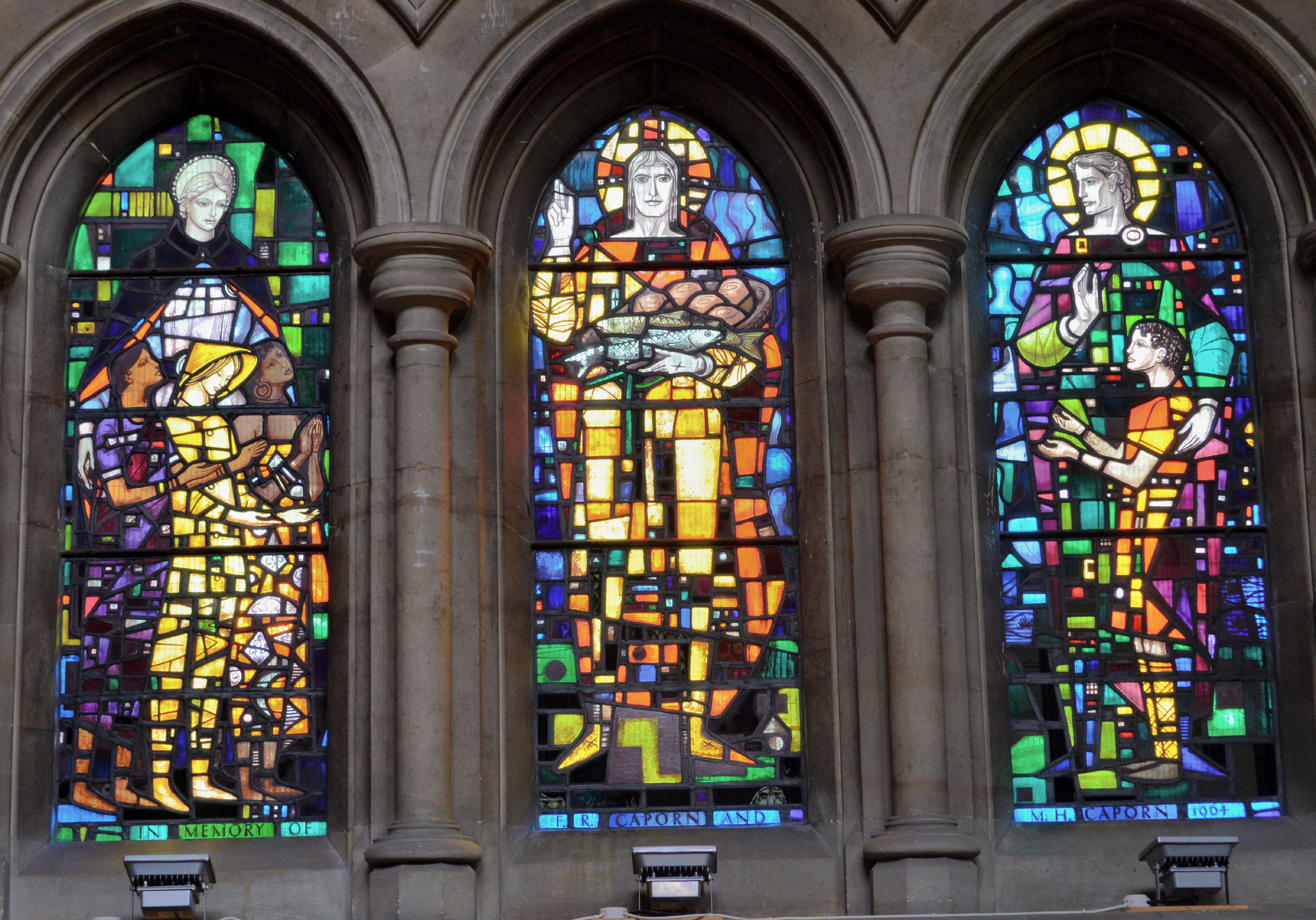
St Matthew's Church, Surbiton
