= St Laurence's Church, Catford =

Church of St Laurence, Catford
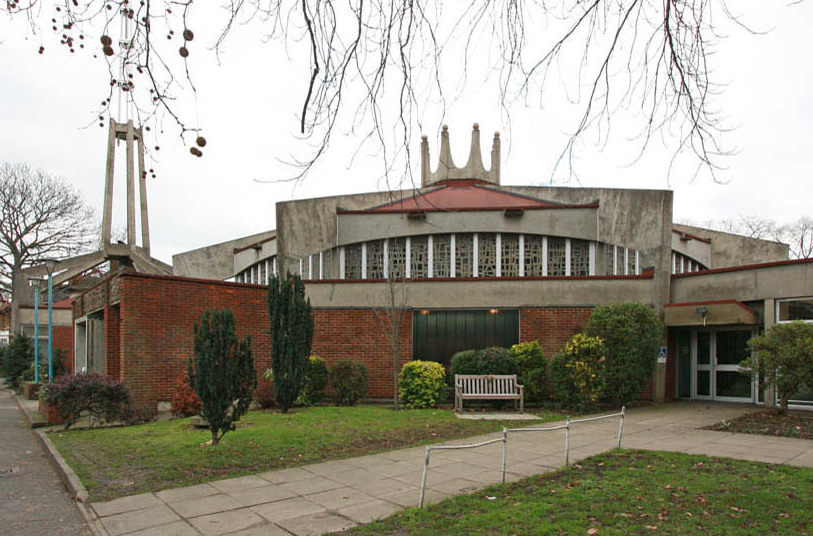
- Church of St Laurence, Catford
- 51.4425241°N 0.0198404°W
- Location: Catford, London
- Country: England
- Denomination: Anglican

History
- Status: Parish church

Architecture
- Functional status: Active
- Heritage designation: Grade II listed
- Designated: 2010
- Architect: Covell, Matthews & Partners
- Style: Modern, Brutalist
- Years built: 1967 - 1968

Administration
- Diocese: Diocese of Southwark

St Laurence's Church, Catford is an Anglican parish church in the London Borough of Lewisham. The present building, completed in 1968, is a notable example of mid-20th-century ecclesiastical architecture in England, reflecting post-war liturgical reforms and the influence of Brutalism. It replaced an earlier Gothic Revival church on a nearby site.

== History ==
The parish of St Laurence, Catford, was established in the late 19th century amid rapid suburban expansion to the south-east of London. The first church was designed by Hugh Roumieu Gough in Gothic Revival style and could seat up to 1,000 worshippers. It was consecrated on 19 November 1887, ahead of the formal establishment of the new parish on 10 August 1888.

Changing urban priorities in the 1960s led to the decision to demolish Gough's church. While this decision was not without controversy, it was confirmed by an act of Parliament, the Saint Laurence, Catford Act 1965 (c. xxxi). The site was duly cleared in 1969 and subsequently redeveloped as part of an extension of Lewisham Town Hall. In advance of demolition, and in accordance with the act of Parliament, a replacement church building was commissioned, the cost of which was covered by the compensation awarded to the parish from Lewisham Borough Council for surrender of the old church and site.

Building of the new church began in 1967 and it was consecrated in 1968, ensuring it could be occupied by the congregation before the old church was closed for demolition. Designed in a modern Brutalist idiom by the architectural practice of Covell, Matthews & Partners, its radical departure in style most likely accounts for the small number of elements from the original church that were preserved and transferred to the new, including a First World War memorial window and the church bell.

== Architecture ==
St Laurence's church was designed by the architect Ralph Covell of the practice Covell, Matthews & Partners, and built by the firm of FC Steele and Partners. It is considered a significant example of mid-century Anglican church architecture, reflecting broader shifts in liturgical practice and modernist architectural expression in the decades following the Second World War. Its integration of modern materials and innovative structural design places it within a wider movement of experimental ecclesiastical buildings constructed in Britain during this period. It was Grade II listed in 2010.

=== Exterior ===
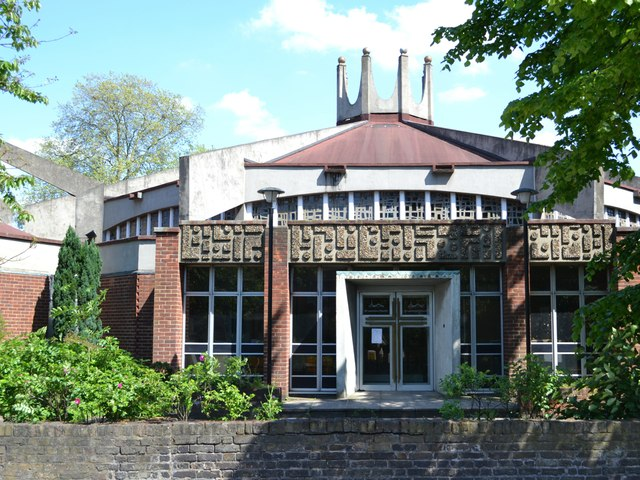
Entrance porch of St Laurence's Church

The main body of the church is a low-rise structure in dark engineering brick and reinforced concrete. Octagonal in shape, the projecting west porch is both the principle point of entry and the most visible elevation from the A21 Bromley Road. Above the glazed front of the porch runs a concrete lintel embossed with a geometric pattern. The roofline rises in eight segments - each divided by a concrete fin - to a crown of eight pinnacles, which rearticulates the building's octagonal plan.

Adjoining the main structure to the north-west is a pentagonal Lady Chapel, above which rises a five-sided open-work spire, the lower order constructed in reinforced concrete and, in its upper sections, aluminium. The lower part houses the church bell. To the south, a rectangular church hall, known as the St Lawrence Centre, is connected via a foyer, forming a cohesive yet functionally distinct community complex.

=== Interior ===
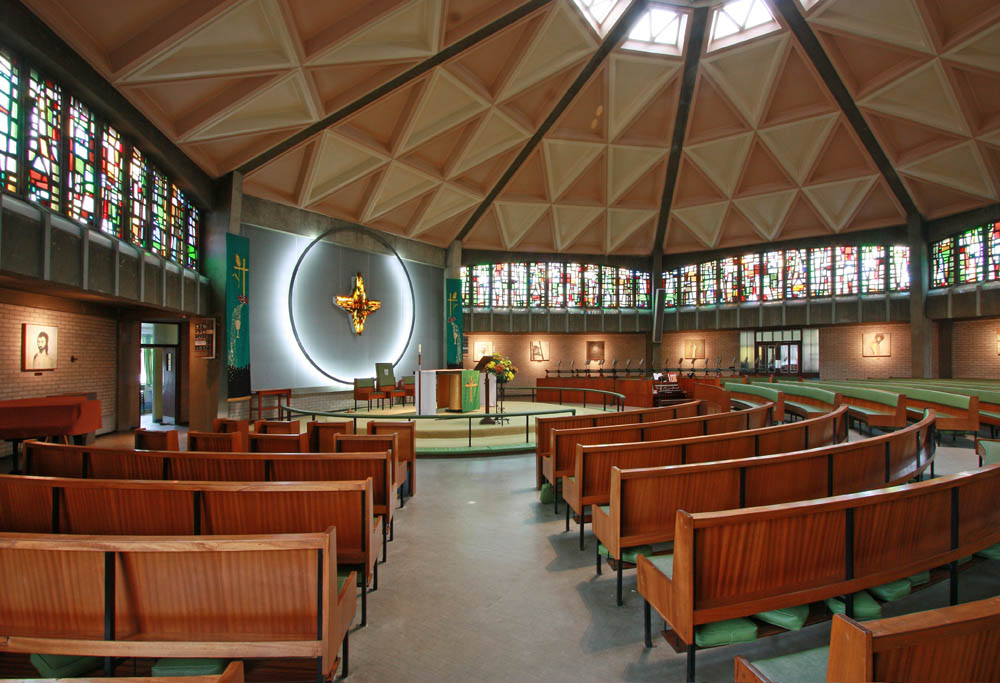
Interior of St Laurence's Church

Inside, the purpose of the octagonal plan of the main worship space reveals itself, chosen to facilitate principle of 'theology in the round'. Associated with the Liturgical Movement, the intention is to bring the congregation closer to the altar and encourage more active participation in the rituals of Communion than is normally the case in a cruciform-plan church where the altar is set back within an architecturally distinct chancel.

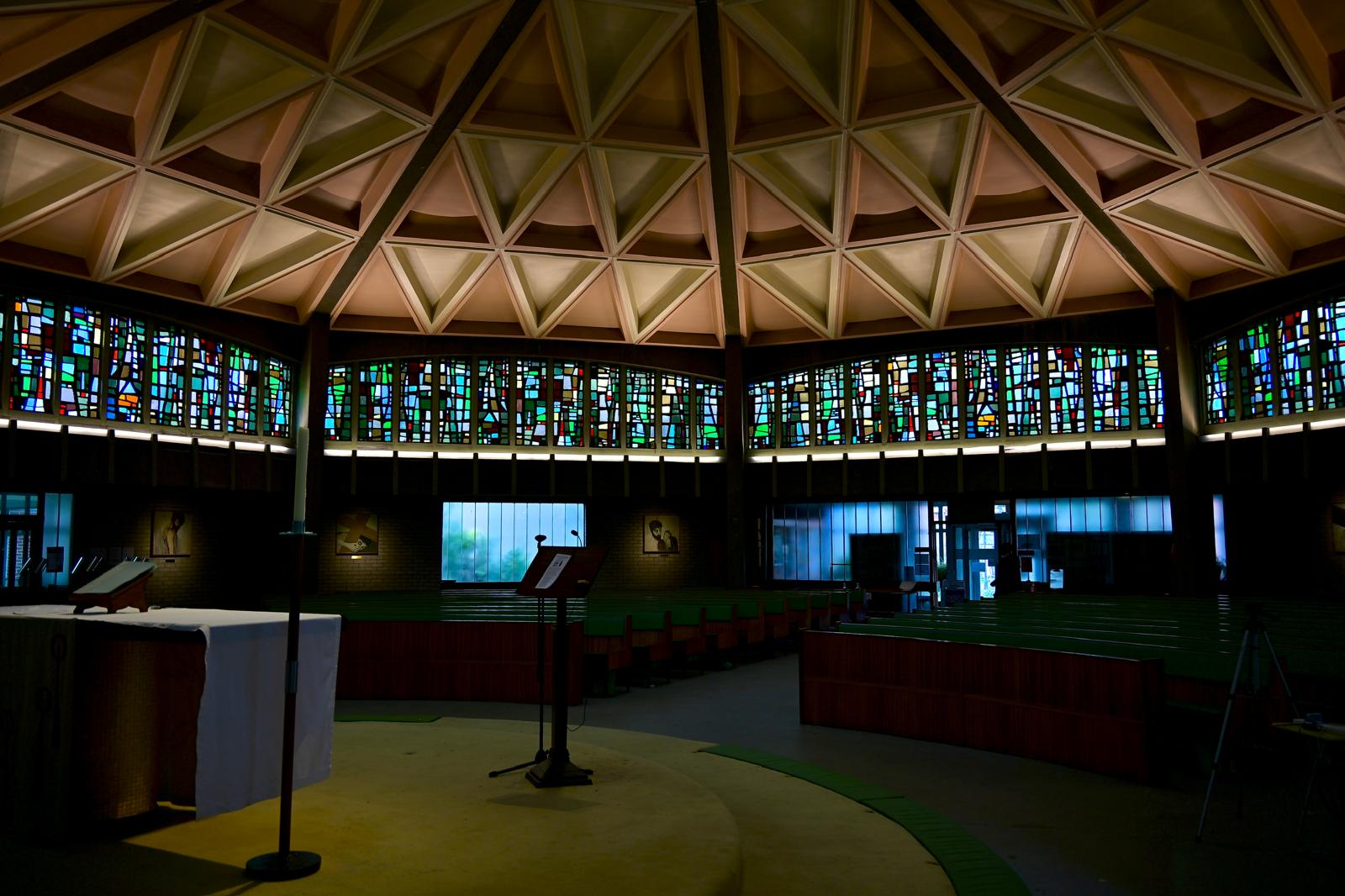
Dalle de Verre glass in St Laurence's Church

The interior architecture continues the exterior Brutalist aesthetic, with an emphasis on exposed materials such as unadorned concrete and brick. The most striking architectural feature is the roof: a reinforced concrete shell composed of eight triangular-coffered segments that rise to converge on a central glazed oculus. Immediately below the roofline, seven wide and narrow spans of dalle de verre glass correspond to each side of the octagon, with the exception of the east wall behind the altar. Each span comprises 11 individual panels made up from hundreds of pieces of multicolored glass that are arranged in an entirely abstract pattern. They were commissioned from the master glassmaker W. T. Carter Shapland and installed during construction.

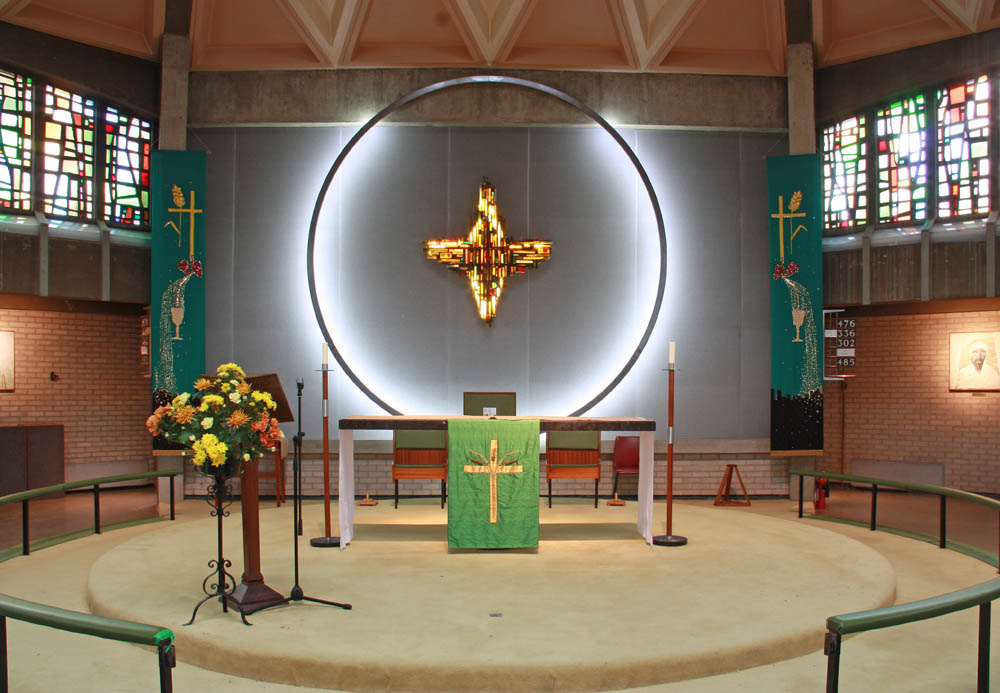
Altar in St Laurence's Church

St Laurence's original furnishings remain largely intact. The wooden pews have green leatherette coverings and, to the south of the altar, these form a set of purpose-built choir stalls, including the organ console, which is recessed into the floor. The altar is simple and free-standing, positioned on a slightly raised platform in front of the east wall. To the centre of the east wall is an illuminated Greek Cross made from jagged shards of thick coloured glass, each laid end-on within a cruciform frame. Part of the original furnishings, the colours and material correspond closely to the dalle de verre windows and it is potentially also the work of Shapland, though no definitive attribution has been found. In 2008 it was complemented by Victoria Rance's 'Comforter' sculpture, a 4.5m polished ring of steel, that, when illuminated from behind, frames both the altar and the illuminated cross.
