= The Old Church (Stoke Newington) =

Arts venue in a former church building

Coordinates: 51°33′41″N 0°05′05″W

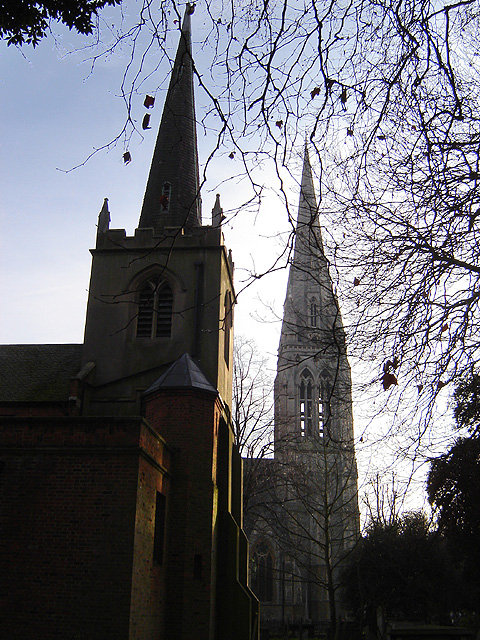
The Old Church in the foreground, with the 1858 St Mary's Church in the background

The Old Church is an arts venue in Stoke Newington, London Borough of Hackney, formerly the medieval and Tudor church of St Mary's Church or (after the construction of the current parish church in 1858) St Mary's Old Church. It is a Grade II* listed building.

== History ==
A church on the site is first recorded in 1314, when a rector was appointed to it - it was then a peculiar of St Paul's Cathedral's dean and chapter, with patronage passing to the crown (1404-1414), back to the dean and chapter (1414-1580), the cathedral's prebendary of Stoke Newington (1585-1830) and finally to the Bishop of London. It was recorded as containing a chapel of St Thomas and a rood screen in 1500. The earliest mention of its dedication to St Mary dates to 1522, whilst the list of rectors survives continuously from 1562 onwards.

Most of the building was completed in 1563, funded by Sir William Patten, lord of the manor of Stoke Newington, encasing the medieval south porch and nave with a completely new chancel, side chapel, aisle, vestry and schoolhouse, all in brick. There are tomb monuments within the building to Patten's successor as lord of the manor John Dudley, Thomas Sutton and the Hartropp family (including descendents of Charles Fleetwood), whilst the cemetery contains the graves of James Stephen, Anna Barbauld and the sister and daughter of William Wilberforce. A strongly Parliamentarian parish, it accepted Alexander Popham's presentation of Thomas Manton as rector in 1644 and had its own vestry elect Daniel Bull as his successor in 1656. He preached there throughout the last years of the Protectorate and the early years of the Restoration, until he was forced from his parish by the Great Ejection of 1662.

Bull's successor Sidrach Simpson (also master of Pembroke College, Cambridge) resided in the parish but was criticised for renting pews to those outside the parish, failing to carry out repairs to the chancel and expanding his pews into the main body of the church. 1716-1717 saw the addition of a north aisle, followed by an extension to the chancel in 1723, new west windows and a raising of the south walls in 1728, further repairs and a new clock bell in 1770 and a raising of the west end to the same height as the rest of the church in 1785. whilst 18th century curates to the parish included Augustus Clissold. The church's replacement was considered but rejected in 1791, with further restorations in 1806 and 1829, the latter by Charles Barry. 16th-century windows were donated by Jonathan Eade in 1811 and destroyed in bombing in October 1940. The building's tower bells were cast at the Whitechapel Bell Foundry between 1828 and 1864. Struggles between low church and Tractarian factions in the parish in the 19th century culminated in the construction of the new St Mary's Church, opened in 1858.

The spire was replaced in both 1829 and 1928. The building was repaired within two months of damage in the London Blitz in October 1940, with further extensive repairs and the addition of a new vestry by Charles Marriott Oldrid Scott completed by 1953, and another remodelling in 2013.
