= Grade I and II* listed buildings in the London Borough of Hackney =

There are over 9,000 Grade I listed buildings and 20,000 Grade II* listed buildings in England. This page is a list of these buildings in the London Borough of Hackney.

== Grade I ==
Name	Location	Type	Completed (Note: The date given is the date used by Historic England as significant for the initial building or that of an important part in the structure's description.)	Date designated	Grid ref. (Note: The grid reference is based on the British national grid reference system, sometimes known as OSGB36, used by the Ordnance Survey.) Geo-coordinates	Entry number (Note: The "List Entry Number" is a unique number assigned to each listed building and scheduled monument by Historic England.)	Image
Church of St Chad	Haggerston	Church	1868–69	3 January 1950	TQ3373783176; 51°31′54″N 0°04′24″W	1265793	Church of St Chad More images
Church of St Columba	Hackney	Church	1868-9	3 January 1950	TQ3344083459; 51°32′03″N 0°04′39″W	1226862	Church of St Columba More images
St Columba's Vicarage, with Link to Church	Hoxton	Vicarage	1873-4	4 February 1975	TQ3345883477; 51°32′04″N 0°04′38″W	1265658	St Columba's Vicarage, with Link to Church More images
Church of St Leonard	Shoreditch	Church	1736	3 January 1950	TQ3348082632; 51°31′37″N 0°04′38″W	1235382	Church of St Leonard More images
Church of St Matthias	Stoke Newington	Church	1851	1 September 1953	TQ3325285488; 51°33′09″N 0°04′46″W	1265031	Church of St Matthias More images
Church of St Michael	Shoreditch	Church	1863-5	3 January 1950	TQ3309582352; 51°31′28″N 0°04′58″W	1265204	Church of St Michael More images
Old Tower of Former Church of St Augustine	Hackney	Tower	Earlier origin	24 April 1951	TQ3499385007; 51°32′52″N 0°03′16″W	1265635	Old Tower of Former Church of St Augustine More images
The Museum of the Home	Hoxton	Museum	c. 1715	3 January 1950	TQ3353383179; 51°31′54″N 0°04′35″W	1226772	The Museum of the Home More images

== Grade II* ==
Name	Location	Type	Completed	Date designated	Grid ref. Geo-coordinates	Entry number	Image
St Mary's Old Church	Hackney	Church	Early 16th century	1 September 1953	TQ3286086459; 51°33′41″N 0°05′05″W	1235419	St Mary's Old Church More images
St Mary's New Church	Hackney	Church	1858	1 September 1953	TQ3287986400; 51°33′39″N 0°05′04″W	1265056	St Mary's New Church More images
Ancillary Building to North of Engine House of Metropolitan Water Board	Hackney	Industrial Building	1854–56	27 April 1987	TQ3229986912; 51°33′56″N 0°05′34″W	1235562	Ancillary Building to North of Engine House of Metropolitan Water Board More images
Church of St Andrew	Hackney	Church	1883-4	9 December 1988	TQ3314387497; 51°34′14″N 0°04′49″W	1264896	Church of St Andrew More images
Church of St Barnabas	Hackney	Church	1910	24 April 1951	TQ3380385537; 51°33′10″N 0°04′17″W	1265135	Church of St Barnabas More images
Church of St John	Hackney	Church	1792-7	24 April 1951	TQ3507785151; 51°32′57″N 0°03′12″W	1226959	Church of St John More images
Church of St John of Jerusalem	Hackney	Church	1845-8	24 April 1951	TQ3559984202; 51°32′26″N 0°02′46″W	1226409	Church of St John of Jerusalem More images
Church of St John the Baptist	Hoxton, Hackney	Church	Victorian	3 January 1950	TQ3302783032; 51°31′50″N 0°05′01″W	1235285	Church of St John the Baptist More images
Church of St Mark	Dalston, Hackney	Church	1864–66	4 February 1975	TQ3388585155; 51°32′58″N 0°04′14″W	1265134	Church of St Mark More images
Church of St Mary of Eton with St Augustine	Hackney	Church	1880	24 April 1951	TQ3665684782; 51°32′43″N 0°01′50″W	1226605	Church of St Mary of Eton with St Augustine More images
Clergy House to West of Church of St Michael	Hackney	Clergy House	1870	4 February 1975	TQ3306482358; 51°31′28″N 0°05′00″W	1226961	Clergy House to West of Church of St Michael More images
Engine House of Metropolitan Water Board	Hackney	Engine house	1854-6	16 May 1972	TQ3231486884; 51°33′55″N 0°05′33″W	1226755	Engine House of Metropolitan Water Board More images
Former French Protestant Hospital (later Cardinal Pole School)	Victoria Park Road	Hospital	1864-1865	4 February 1975	TQ3586484065; 51°32′21″N 0°02′32″W	1235554	Former French Protestant Hospital (later Cardinal Pole School) More images
Hoxton Hall	Hackney	Music Hall	1863	28 June 1972	TQ3328283186; 51°31′55″N 0°04′48″W	1226830	Hoxton Hall More images
Niche in North West Corner of Forecourt of the Museum of the Home	Hackney	Wall		4 February 1975	TQ3349183229; 51°31′56″N 0°04′37″W	1265687	Niche in North West Corner of Forecourt of the Museum of the Home More images
Pond House	Hackney	Villa	c. 1800	24 April 1951	TQ3498485949; 51°33′23″N 0°03′16″W	1226931	Pond House More images
Refreshment Rooms	Hackney	Villa	Late 18th century	1 September 1953	TQ3275486438; 51°33′40″N 0°05′11″W	1226509	Refreshment Rooms More images
Sisters' House and School to North of Church of St Columba	Hackney	House	1898	4 February 1975	TQ3343483481; 51°32′04″N 0°04′39″W	1265691	Sisters' House and School to North of Church of St Columba
St Chad's Vicarage	Hackney	Vicarage	c. 1870	4 February 1975	TQ3373983157; 51°31′53″N 0°04′24″W	1226697	St Chad's Vicarage More images
St Michael's Church School	Hackney	Church School	1870	4 February 1975	TQ3304882367; 51°31′28″N 0°05′01″W	1226884	St Michael's Church School More images
Cathedral of the Nativity of Our Lord, Upper Clapton	Hackney	Church	1892-5	12 September 1969	TQ3407287831; 51°34′24″N 0°04′00″W	1235310	Cathedral of the Nativity of Our Lord, Upper Clapton More images
The Hackney Empire	Hackney	Television Studio	1950s	28 June 1972	TQ3491184748; 51°32′44″N 0°03′21″W	1226960	The Hackney Empire More images
New Lansdowne Club	Hackney	House	Early 18th century	24 April 1951	TQ3492884226; 51°32′27″N 0°03′21″W	1265590	New Lansdowne Club More images
United Reformed Church	Hackney	Church	1869–91	7 May 1974	TQ3515985508; 51°33′08″N 0°03′07″W	1265632	United Reformed Church More images
81 and 83 Stoke Newington Church Street	Hackney	House	Early to mid 18th century	1 September 1953	TQ3331186548; 51°33′43″N 0°04′42″W	1265043	81 and 83 Stoke Newington Church Street
85 and 87 Stoke Newington Church Street	Hackney	House	Early to mid 18th century	1 September 1953	TQ3329786544; 51°33′43″N 0°04′42″W	1235420	85 and 87 Stoke Newington Church Street
187, 189, and 191 High Street	Hackney	House	Early 18th century	1 September 1953	TQ3361686613; 51°33′45″N 0°04′26″W	1235537	187, 189, and 191 High Street More images
91–101 Worship Street	Hackney	Dwelling	1862	3 January 1950	TQ3317582098; 51°31′20″N 0°04′55″W	1235558	91–101 Worship Street More images
16 Charles Square	Hackney	House	Early to mid 18th century	3 January 1950	TQ3294082635; 51°31′37″N 0°05′06″W	1265891	16 Charles Square More images
Sutton House, 2 and 4 Homerton High Street	Hackney	House	c. 1530	24 April 1951	TQ3527685090; 51°32′55″N 0°03′02″W	1226810	Sutton House, 2 and 4 Homerton High Street More images
