= St Mary, Haggerston =

Destroyed church in London Borough of Hackney, UK

Coordinates: 51°32′4″N 0°4′15″W

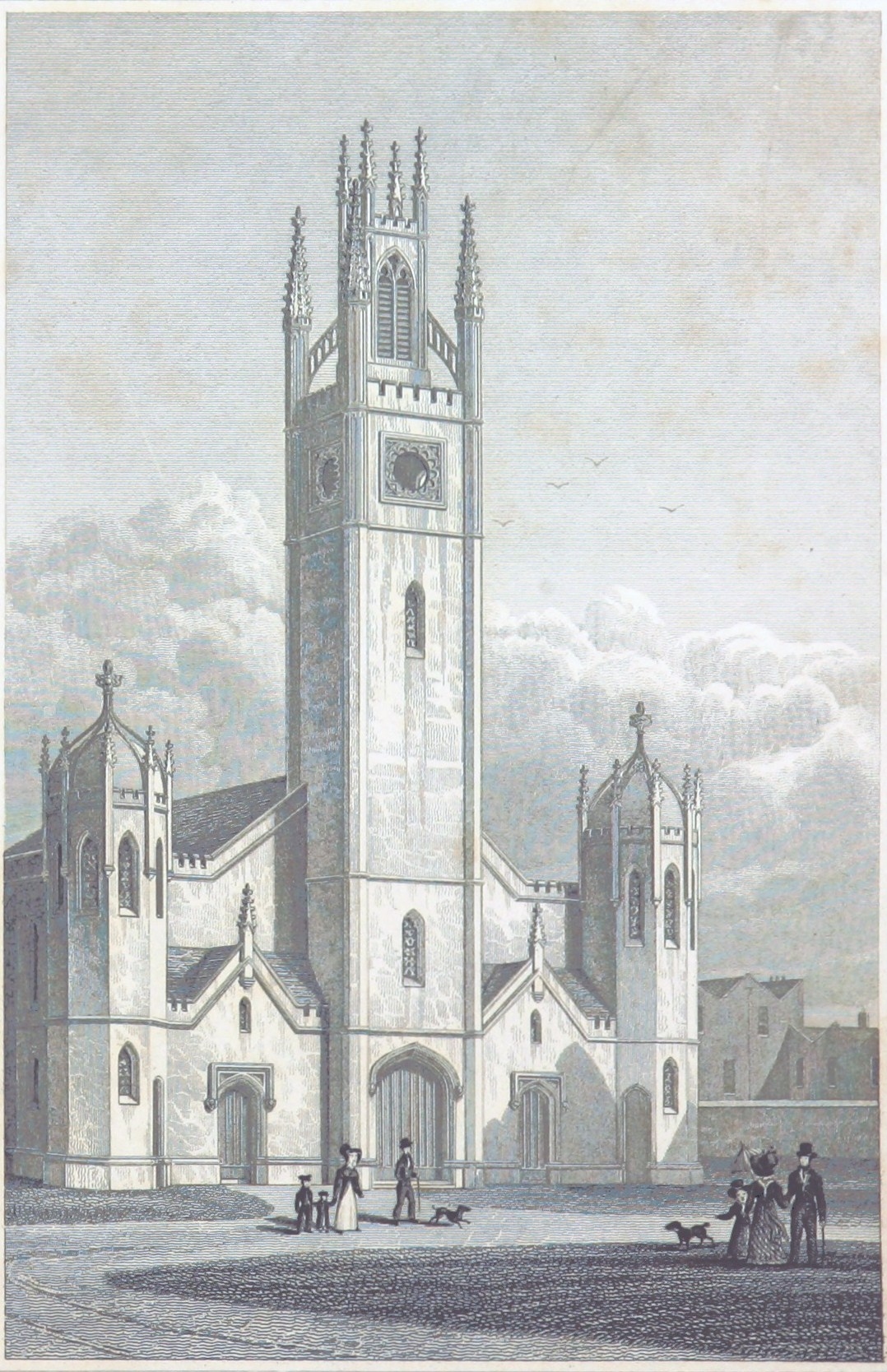
The tower and west front of the church, in an engraving after a drawing by T.H.Shepherd, published in Shepherd and Elmes' Metropolitan Improvements (1828).

St Mary, Haggerston, was an Anglican parish church built to the designs of John Nash in 1827, in what is now the London Borough of Hackney. Built in the Gothic style of its time, it had an elaborate west front with a disproportionately tall tower. The rest of the church was, in comparison, rather plain. It was altered later in the 19th century by James Brooks as the first initiative of the Haggerston Church Scheme, and destroyed by bombs during the Second World War. The site is now a children's playground west of Haggerston Park, between Thurtle Road and Queensbridge Road.

== History ==
St Mary, Haggerston, was a "Commissioners' church", built under an Act of Parliament of 1818 which granted £1,000,000 for the building of new churches. The Church Building Commission, set up under the act to distribute the money and oversee construction, was advised on architectural questions by the Board of Trade, whose three architects, John Soane, John Nash and Robert Smirke were asked for sample plans and estimates as soon as the act was passed. Nash built only two churches for the commissioners: the Neoclassical All Souls, Langham Place, and the Gothic St Mary, Haggerston.

Once a hamlet in the parish of St. Leonard, Shoreditch, Haggerston had developed into an increasingly populated suburb of London by the time the church was built, and an increasingly industrialised one, with the opening of gasworks along the Regent's Canal from 1822, and the growth of various manufacturing industries.

The church was consecrated by the Bishop of London on 29 March 1827. The estimated cost of construction was £12,496 and it was designed to seat 1,700 worshippers.

== Architecture ==
The church had a substantial west front with side turrets, from the centre of which rose an unusually tall tower. Various apocryphal stories grew up to account for the great height of the attenuated tower. Its construction to such a height was made possible by the purchase by the contractor of a large amount of moderately priced Bath stone from the demolished Wanstead House.

Reviewing the church for the Gentleman's Magazine, Edward John Carlos blamed what he saw as the building's deficiencies on the ambitions of its architect exceeding the limited budget available:

From this cause it is, that we see some parts of the building highly ornamented, brought into collision with others distinguished by the greatest plainness, and a facade marked by attempts at expensive decoration attached to an ugly meeting-house looking body.

The stone-faced west front had a central square tower flanked by porches; at each end of the front was a polygonal turret, housing the stairs leading up to the galleries over the aisles, an arrangement which saved space within the body of the church. The tower had octagonal buttresses terminating in pinnacles, and was divided into four storeys by string courses, the third storey being disproportionately tall. and mostly blank, with a round window near the top. The whole tower was surmounted by a square lantern. The remainder of the building was brick, with stone dressings. The east end was gabled, with a small three-light window.

The style combined motifs from different eras of Gothic architecture with those invented by more recent Gothic revivalists. The brick nave was lit by a double row of windows, those in the upper tier being in a kind of "Carpenter's Gothic" in which the tracery was of a simplified form, intersecting without cusps or foliations, while those in the lower tier were square-headed windows of a very late Gothic style. Carlos complained that:

The detail is excessively faulty; instead of its being selected from the works of antiquity, the paltry inventions of Wyatt and his school have been adopted, and "the fantastic order" triumphs where the pointed style ought alone to reign.

The nave and aisles were separated by arcades, each of eight pointed arches. There were galleries over the aisles, and an organ gallery, at the west end, with another in front of it, supported on iron columns, for "charity children". They were panelled vestries built into the corners at the east end: Carlos said they had "much the appearance of brewers' vats." The ceilings of the aisles were horizontal, while that of the nave was horizontal in the centre, but sloped at the sides; it was ornamented only with narrow bands, crossing it above the spandrels of the arches.

== Haggerston Church Scheme ==
In 1860 John Ross was appointed vicar of Haggerston. He set to work on improving his church and on making better provision for his parish, which had a population of more than 30,000, although congregations at St Mary's had fallen to as few as 200. With the help of Robert Foster and Robert Brett, the co-founder of St Matthias Church, Stoke Newington, he set about raising funds for what became known as the Haggerston Church Scheme.

The first practical initiative of the scheme was the provision of a chancel and sanctuary for the parish church, suitable for the contemporary high church ideas of proper Christian ritual. The architect James Brooks was brought in to make the alterations, which were to bring him a great deal of positive attention and advance his career. The chancel was formed out of east end of the nave, while the sanctuary was built out beyond it, connected to the much wider nave by a "canted" or sloping bay. The new sanctuary was vaulted, and lit by a large five-light window in the Decorated style, with glass by Clayton and Bell. In other changes, Nash's arcade pillars were reshaped into a more authentic Gothic form, the lower tier of windows was removed, and the upper ones given Decorated tracery. The galleries were removed and the box-pews were replaced with more open substitutes. The nave and aisles were reroofed.

A choral service was introduced, along with "a simple yet dignified ritual", and the congregations increased considerably.

== Organ ==
The church's organ had a complex history. It was originally built by Father Smith for St George's Chapel, Windsor, where it remained until 1788, when it was transferred to Windsor parish church. In about 1825, when that church was rebuilt, part of the organ was sent to Haggerston, and part to a non-conformist chapel in Long Melford. During the alterations of 1861–2 the organ at St Mary's was moved from the west gallery to the east end of the south aisle. In the early 20th century it still retained some of Smith's work, notably the woodwork.

== Destruction ==
The church was destroyed by bombs in 1941, and from 1953 the parish was united with that of St Chad's Church, Haggerston. The site of the church, between Queensbridge Road and Thurtle Road, became a playground.
