= London Architectural Salvage and Supply Company =

The London Architectural Salvage and Supply Company or LASSCO is a British company formed in 1979. They focus on the recovery and restoration of furniture and building materials in and around London, United Kingdom, and have developed a large collection of recliamed materials over the years. They have had access to salvage furniture at historical buildings such as the British Library and the Victoria and Albert Museum.

It was originally sited in the former church of St Michael Shoreditch. It later acquired yards in Islington and Bermondsey, and has operated out of Brunswick House in Vauxhall since 2004. Barry Phillips considers them to be the "grand old man" of reclamation yards.
