= Bridge Academy (disambiguation) =

Bridge Academy may refer to:

- Bridges Academy, School for twice-exceptional students in Los Angeles
- The Bridge Academy, Secondary school in Haggerston, London
- Bridge of Don Academy, Secondary school in Aberdeen, Scotland
- Milo Academy Bridge, Covered bridge in Milo, Oregon, U.S.
- Naval Academy Bridge, Bridge over the Severn River in Annapolis, Maryland
