= James Brooks (architect) =

English architect (1825–1901)

James Brooks FRIBA
- James Brooks
- Born: 30 March 1825; Hatford
- Died: 7 October 1901 (aged 76); Stoke Newington
- Occupation: Architect

James Brooks FRIBA (1825–1901) was an influential English Gothic Revival architect and designer. Brooks established his reputation through a series of landmark churches built in the East End of London in the 1860 and 1870s, and was awarded the Royal Institute of British Architects' Royal Gold Medal in 1895.

== Early life ==
Brooks was born in Hatford, near Wantage, Berkshire, in 1825. He was educated at John Roysse's Free School in Abingdon-on-Thames (now Abingdon School) which he attended from about 1835 until 1840. In 1847 he was articled to the London architect Lewis Stride. He attended Thomas Leverton Donaldson's lectures at University College London, and enrolled as a student at the Royal Academy Schools.

== Career ==
Brooks set up in practice in about 1852. He exhibited at the Royal Academy between 1853 and 1899; from 1894 as "James Brooks and Sons". Arthur Heygate Mackmurdo was his pupil. He was architect to the Diocesan Society of Canterbury, and a consulting architect to the Incorporated Society for Building Churches. He became a Fellow of the Royal Society of British Architects in 1866, and was its vice-president from 1892–96. He received its Royal Gold Medal in 1895. His address is given in the catalogues of the Royal Academy as 6 Bloomsbury Street between 1853 and 1862; 11, Serle Street, Lincoln's Inn, between 1871 and 1875, and 35 Wellington Street, Strand from 1876. He lived, however, for much of this time at The Grange, Park-lane, in Stoke Newington (now numbered 42, Clissold Crescent), a red-brick house built to his own design in 1862. It was at this residence that he died on 7 October 1901 aged 76.

=== East London churches ===
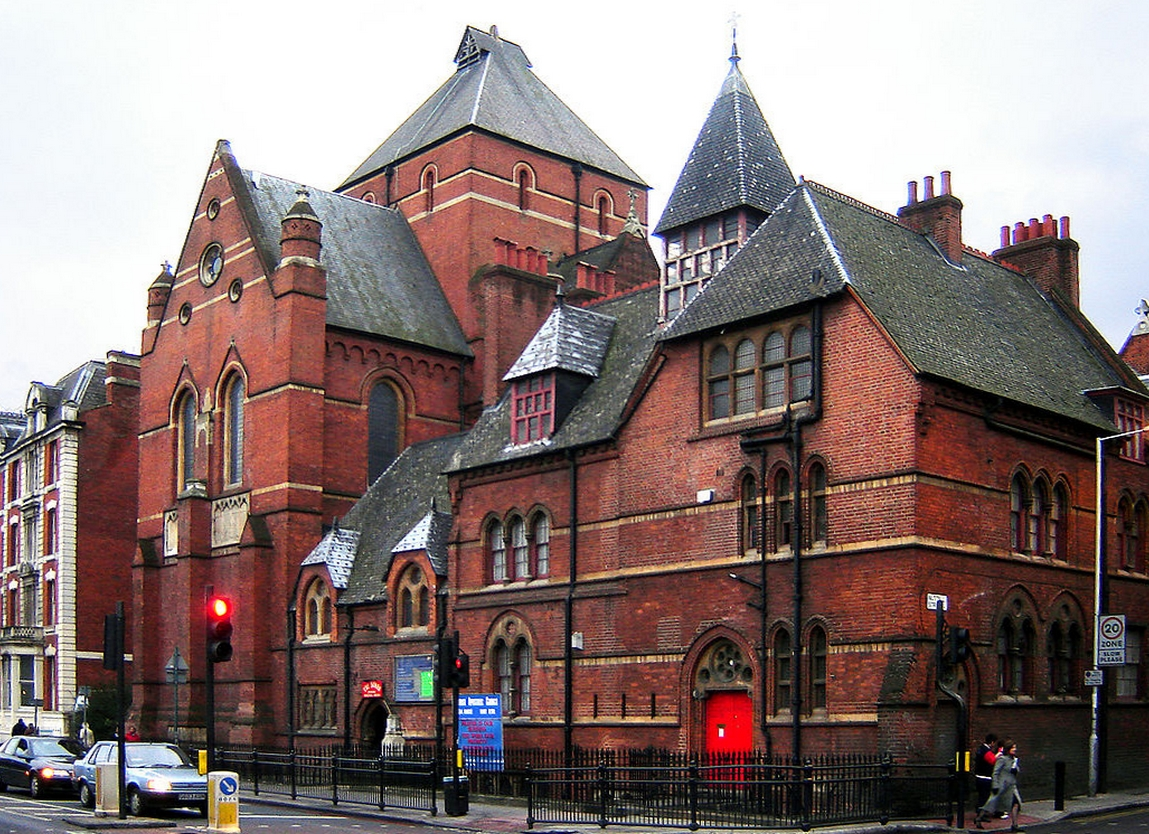
St Columba's, church, Haggerston

Brooks attracted attention early in his career for several large brick-built churches in East London: St. Michael and All Angels, Shoreditch, St Saviour, Hoxton, St. Columba, Haggerston and St. Chad, Haggerston.

The last two churches were built as part of the Haggerston Church Scheme, which had been set up in 1860 on the initiative of the vicar of St Mary, Haggerston, the parish church of the district. St Mary's, built in 1827, had been designed by John Nash in the Gothic style of his time. The first initiative of the scheme was to create a chancel and sanctuary of the kind held to be suitable for modern high church ideas of religious ritual. Brooks was brought in to do the work and, according to T. Francis Bumpus, "the boldness with which he grappled with such a monster as Nash's structure won him much praise. It was one of his earliest works, and its cleverness and originality brought him into public notice."

Money was then raised for new churches, and four new parishes were created in Haggerston, and provided with temporary buildings, three of which were soon superseded by permanent buildings, dedicated to three British missionary saints – Augustine, Chad and Columba – and completed by the summer of 1869. Brooks designed the last two.

The East London churches were intended for mission work in poor, crowded areas, and built on restricted budgets. The Church Builder said of them

They are spacious in plan, affording ample accommodation for the estimated congregations, and an almost lavish supply of room besides in unseated aisles and transepts. They are all also of unusual height. Their effect is obtained partly by this spaciousness and height, partly by the fine proportions of all the parts, partly by a bold, severe dignity in the style of design.

They were characterised by their broad naves with narrow aisles; transepts which projected hardly, if at all, beyond the aisle walls, and brick vaulted chancels with north and south aisles. The exteriors were plain and unbuttressed, in red brick with stone sparingly used for window dressings and plate tracery, and for occasional bands of relief. Another East London church, St Andrew, Plaistow, was similar in conception, but faced in stone. Brooks tended to use stilted arches, and employed a distinctive type of lierne vault in his chancel, in which the vaults themselves were brick and the ribs stone. Brooks also designed the furniture and liturgical furnishings of several of these churches, most notably at St Columba's; at St Chad's, he designed the reredos, carved by Thomas Earp, and the pulpit.

=== Secular architecture ===
Once he had established his reputation as an ecclesiastical architect he built few secular works. An exception was the South Eastern Hotel at Deal in Kent (1894), an asymmetric Renaissance Dutch-style building, in red brick with stone dressings. He showed drawings for the hotel at the Royal Academy in 1893.

== Works ==
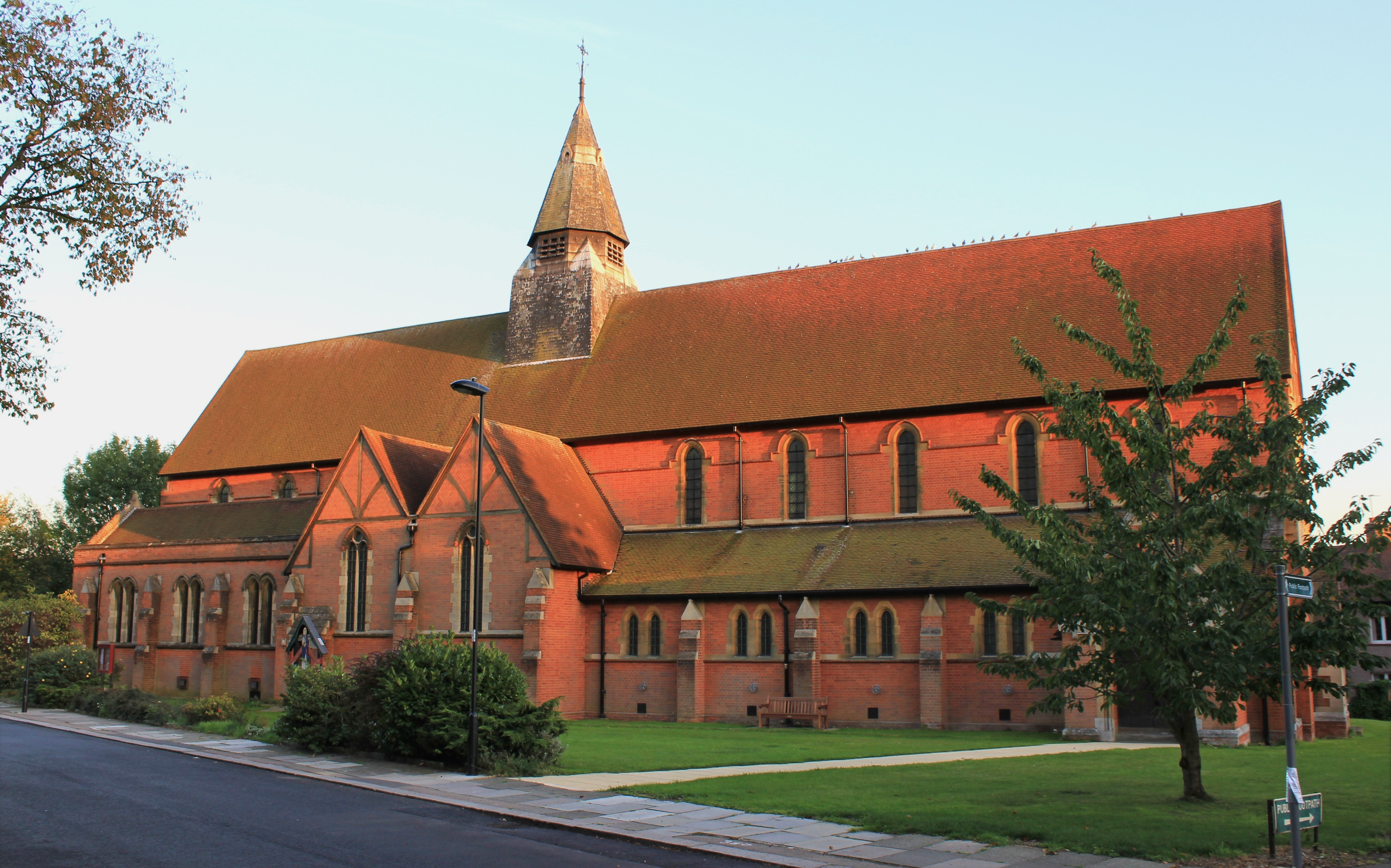
St Luke, Browning Road, Enfield

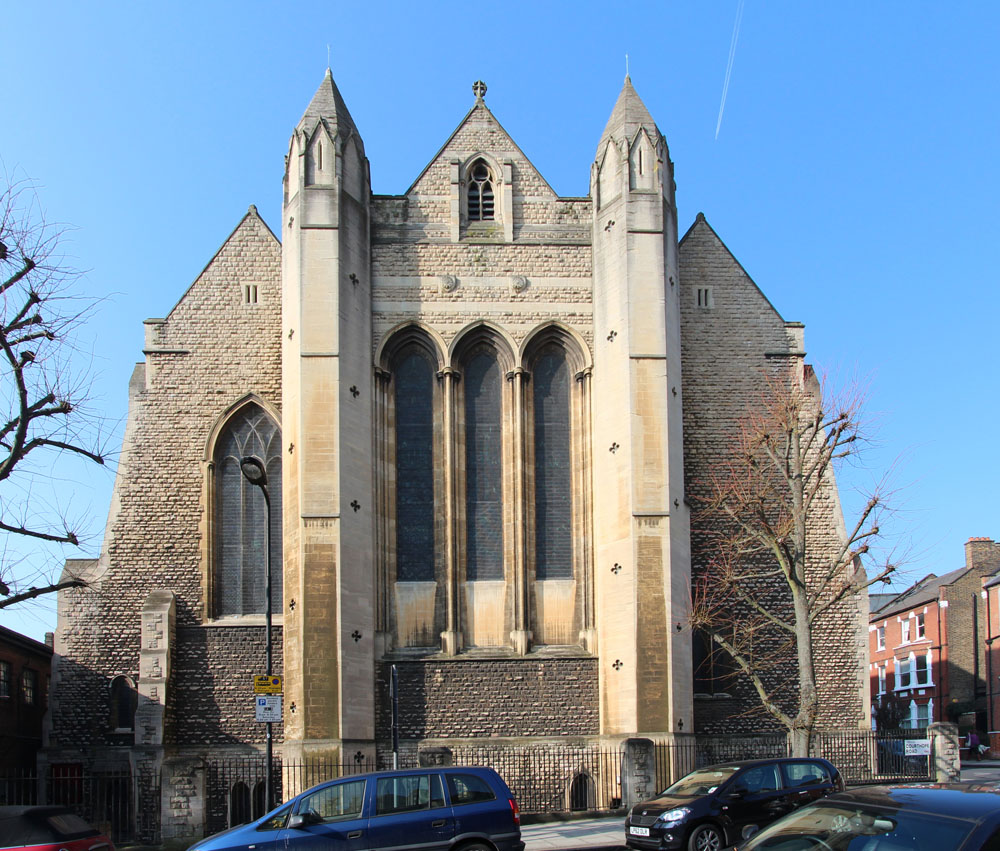
All Hallows, Gospel Oak

- School, Hart Street, Henley (1856).
- Framland, Challow Road, Wantage. A house for Judge J. Mackonockie (1862).
- The Grange, Stoke Newington (1862). Brooks' own house, now numbered 42, Clissold Crescent.
- St Michael the Archangel, Shoreditch (1863–66). Now an architectural salvage warehouse.
- St Saviour, Hoxton (1864–66). Destroyed.
- Headington Quarry National School, near Oxford
- St Columba, Haggerston (1867–69), with "The Sisters' House" (1898).
- St Chad, Haggerston (1867–69), with a vicarage of 1870
- St Andrew, Barking Road, Plaistow (opened 1870).
- Church of the Annunciation, Chislehurst (1868–70).
- St Saviour, Mortomley, Yorkshire (1869–72).
- All Saints, Perry Street, Northfleet(1867–71).
- School, Nutton Road, Wolstanton (1871).
- Rectory, Maiseyhampton, Gloucestershire (c.1872).
- St John the Baptist, Holland Road, Kensington (foundation stone laid 1872, completed after many changes of plan, by J. D. Adkins in 1911).
- Edgware Abbey 1873-90.
- Extensions to Humewood Castle, Kiltegan, County Wicklow (1873–77), for William Wentworth Fitzwilliam Hume Dick. Humewood Castle is a Gothic Revival mansion built in 1867 to a design by William White; Brooks added an extra storey on the north wing, and a circular tower at end of stable block.
- South aisle of the church at Kiltegan, County Wicklow, and the adjoining Hume Mausoleum (1875).
- St James, Marston Meysey, Wiltshire (1874–76).
- The Ascension, Lavender Hill, Battersea (1876; taken over by J. T. Micklewhite and Somers Clarke in 1882, completed by them in 1898).
- St Modoc's Episcopal Church, George Street, Doune, Scotland (1877).
- Church of the Transfiguration (later St Barnabus), Algernon Road, Lewisham (1881).
- Stables and coach house for the Marquis of Londonderry, Brick Street, Westminster.
- St Michael, Coppenhall (chancel 1883, the nave by J. Brooks, Son and Adkins, 1907–10).
- St Peter, St Leonards-on Sea, Sussex (1885).
- St Andrew, Willesden (1885–92), and vicarage (1889)
- All Saints, Prittlewell, Southend (1886–91).
- Holy Innocents, Hammersmith (1886–91).
- St Mary, Hornsey (1887–89). replacement for medieval church, itself demolished 1969.
- St Peter and St. Paul, St Alphege Road, Charlton, near Dover, Kent (1891–93).
- St Chad, Wybunbury, Cheshire (1891–93). Demolished.
- All Hallows, Savernake Road, Gospel Oak. Originally the Church of the Good Shepherd (1892–1914).
- St Peter, Hornsey (1896–98).
- St Luke, Browning Road, Enfield (1897–1900 and 1905–06).
- St Mary and St Chad, Longton, Staffordshire (1898). Additions by J. D. Adkins, 1910, remodelled in the 1980s.

== Publications ==
- Brooks, James. Report on the design for Liverpool Cathedral (1885).

== Bibliography ==
- Dixon, Rodger Edmund (1976).The life and works of James Brooks 1825-1901. England: University of London, Courtauld Institute of Art.

== See also ==
- List of Old Abingdonians
