= Robert Brett (surgeon) =

Robert Brett (1808–1874), was an English surgeon and writer of devotional books, involved with the tractarian movement.

== Life ==
Brett was born on 11 September 1808, it is believed at or near Luton, Bedfordshire. As soon as he was old enough, he entered St George's Hospital, London, as a medical pupil, and passed his examinations, both as MRCSE and LSAL, in 1830. He then probably filled some hospital posts, and most certainly married. At this time he wished to take holy orders, and go abroad as a missionary. But he was dissuaded from such a step, and continued the practice of his profession. On the death of his wife, he went as assistant to Samuel Reynolds, a surgeon at Stoke Newington, whose sister he married, and with whom he entered into a partnership which lasted fourteen years. He continued to practise at Stoke Newington until his death, on 3 February 1874.

== Religious activities ==
He entered enthusiastically into the tractarian movement from its commencement, doing all in his power as a layman to forward it; he became friends with most of the leaders, especially Edward Bouverie Pusey, and his whole life and means were spent in promoting the interests of this section of the Church of England. Even the motto on his carriage was "Pro Ecclesia Dei". It was owing to his calling the attention of Edward Coleridge, of Eton, to the deplorable condition of the ruins of St Augustine's Abbey, Canterbury, that a scheme was set on foot which resulted, through the munificence of Alexander Beresford Hope, in the establishment of St Augustine's Missionary College.

He parcelled out the parish of St Matthias, Stoke Newington, and was the chief agent in the building of its church, completed in 1853 to the designs of William Butterfield. Brett thought that the Dissenting chapels such as Newington Green Unitarian Church were attracting worshippers in part because the Anglican pews were full. He was subsequently involved in the erection of two churches at Haggerston and St Faith's, Stoke Newington.

He did other practical good work in founding the Guild of St Luke, which consists of a band of medical men who co-operate with the clergy. He was an active member of the first church union that was started, and was at the time of his death a vice-president of the English Church Union.

He wrote sixteen devotional books, including Devotions for the Sick Room Companion for the Sick Room, and Thoughts during Sickness. He was buried on 7 February 1874 at Tottenham Cemetery. A large number of clergymen, noblemen, physicians, and barristers attended his funeral.
