= Tottenham Cemetery =

Burial ground in North London

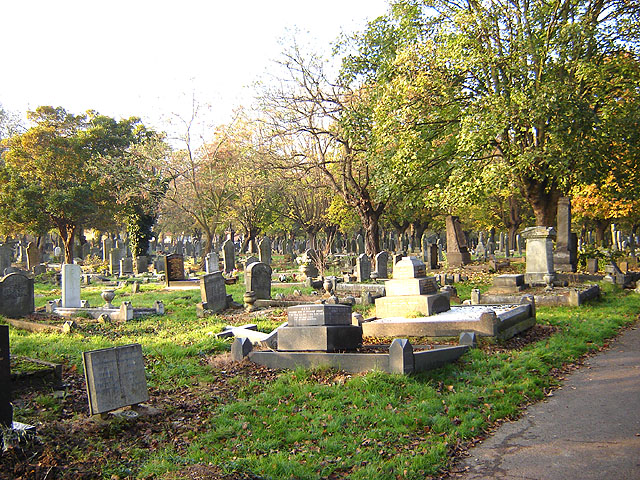
- Interactive map of Tottenham Cemetery

Details
- Established: 1858
- Location: White Hart Lane, Tottenham, Greater London, N17
- Country: England
- Coordinates: 51.603°N 0.078°W
- Type: Public
- Owned by: Dignity Crematoria Ltd
- Size: 62 acres (25 ha)
- Website: Official website
- Find a Grave: Tottenham Cemetery

Tottenham Cemetery is a large burial ground in Tottenham in the London Borough of Haringey, in north London, England. It was opened in 1858 by the Tottenham Burial Board to replace the churchyard of All Hallows' Church, Tottenham which had closed the previous year. The original five-acre site was not entirely consecrated, with two acres designated for non-Church of England burials.

== Chapels ==
The cemetery contains two original chapels, one built for Anglican services and one for other denominations. The buildings were designed by the architect George Pritchett in an early Gothic style. They were constructed primarily of Kentish ragstone, but include Bath stone dressings.

== War graves ==
The cemetery contains the Commonwealth war graves of 293 service personnel of World War I, most of whom are buried in a war graves plot on the western side of the cemetery, backed by a screen wall listing those buried in the plot and elsewhere in the cemetery whose graves could not be individually marked. Most of the 212 war graves from World War II are scattered in the cemetery but 30 of them lie in a small plot facing the World War I plot. Those whose graves could not be individually marked are listed on supplementary panels on the screen wall.

== Notable burials ==
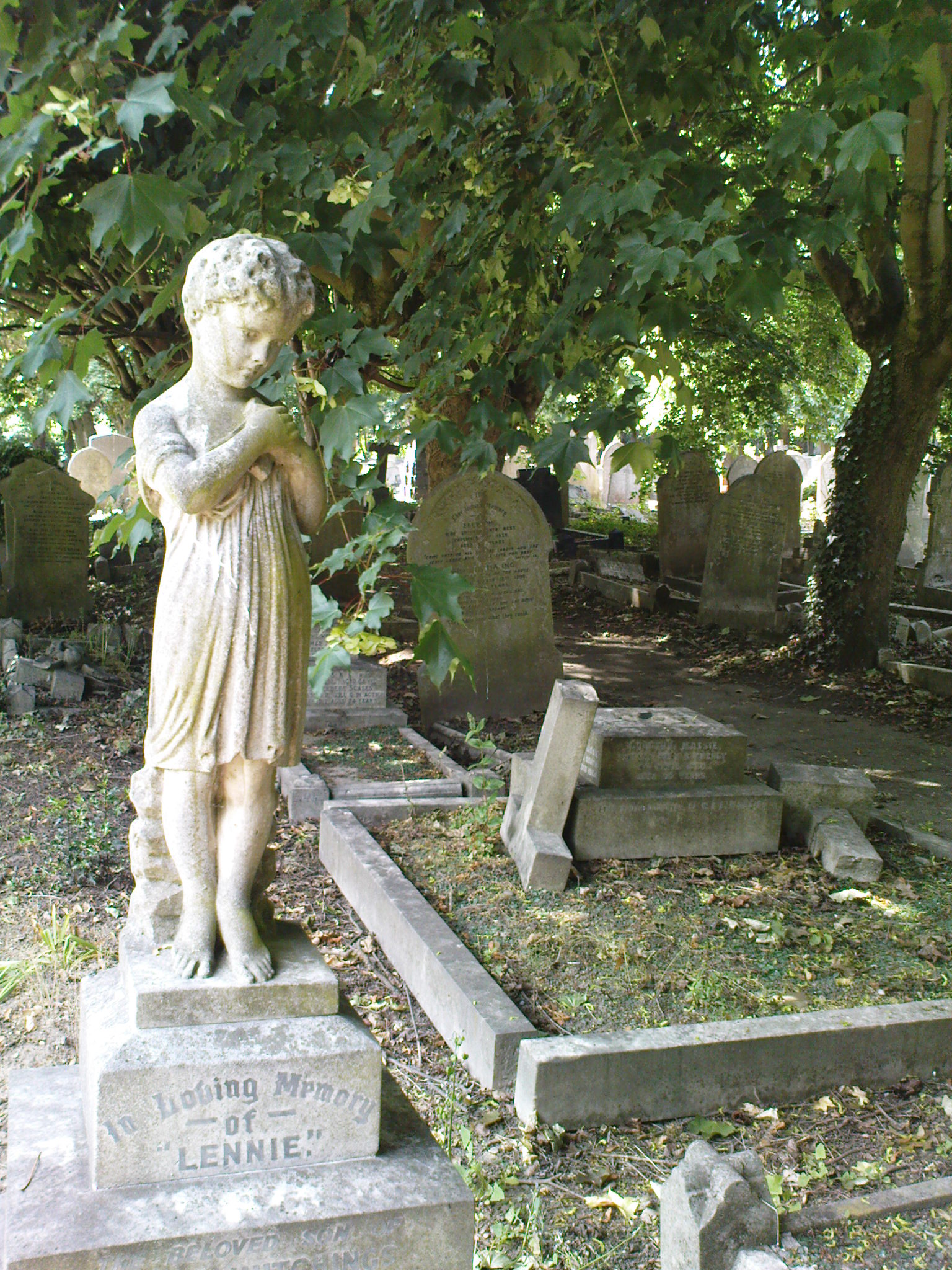
A grave

- Robert Brett (1808–1874), an English surgeon and writer of devotional books, involved with the tractarian movement.
- John Eliot Howard (1807–1883), an English chemist of the nineteenth century, who conducted pioneering work with the development of quinine
- William Butterfield (1814–1900), a Gothic Revival architect (tomb now a listed monument)
- Thomas Bidgood (1858–1925), an English conductor, composer and arranger (buried in an unmarked grave)
- Alfred Edward Durrant VC ISM (1864–1933), an English recipient of the Victoria Cross
- Edward Henry "Ted" Willis, Baron Willis (1914–1992), a British playwright, novelist and screenwriter who was also politically active in support of the Labour Party
- Bernie Grant (1944–2000) was a British Labour Party politician who was the Member of Parliament for Tottenham, London, from 1987 to his death in 2000.

== Sources ==
- Fred Fisk The History of the Ancient Parish of Tottenham in the County of Middlesex, from early Druidical times, B.C. to A.D. 1923 (Tottenham, 1923), pp. 145–6, 340
- Hugh Meller & Brian Parsons, London Cemeteries: an Illustrated Guide and Gazetteer, 4th edition (The History Press, 2008)
