= Alfred Edward Durrant =

Recipient of the Victoria Cross (1864–1933)

Alfred Edward Durrant VC ISM
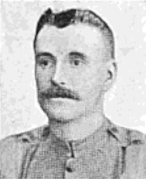
- Durrant circa 1923
- Born: 4 November 1864; Westminster, London
- Died: 29 March 1933 (aged 68); Tottenham, London
- Burial place: Tottenham Cemetery
- Military career
- Allegiance: United Kingdom
- Branch: British Army
- Rank: Lance Corporal
- Units: The Rifle Brigade
- Conflicts: Mahdist War; Second Boer War
- Awards: Victoria Cross; Imperial Service Medal

Alfred Edward Durrant VC ISM (4 November 1864 – 29 March 1933) was an English recipient of the Victoria Cross, the highest and most prestigious award for gallantry in the face of the enemy that can be awarded to British and Commonwealth forces.

== Details ==
He was 35 years old, and a private in the 2nd Battalion, The Rifle Brigade (Prince Consort's Own), British Army during the Second Boer War when the following deed took place on 27 August 1900 at the Battle of Bergendal, South Africa, for which he was awarded the VC:

At Bergendal, on the 27th August, 1900, Acting-Corporal Wellar having been wounded, and being somewhat dazed, got up from his prone position in the firing line, exposing himself still more to the enemy's fire, and commenced to run towards them. Private Durrant rose, and pulling him down endeavoured to keep him quiet, but finding this impossible he took him up and carried him back for 200 yards under a heavy fire to shelter, returning immediately to his place in the line.

He later achieved the rank of lance-corporal. His Victoria Cross is displayed at the Royal Green Jackets (Rifles) Museum, Winchester, England.
