= St Mary of Eton =

Church in London, England

St. Mary of Eton
- St Mary of Eton with St Augustine.
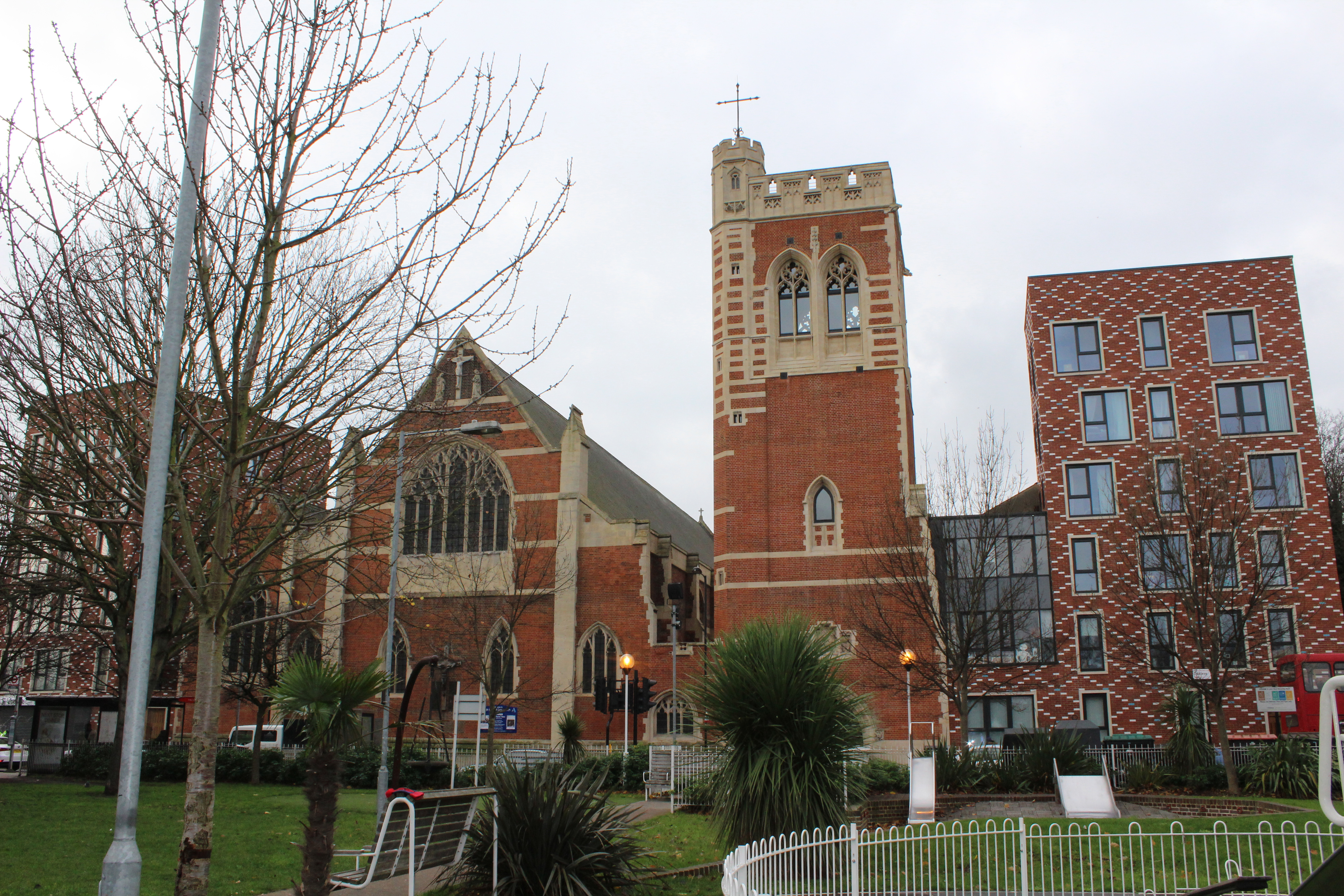
- St. Mary of Eton, Hackney Wick

- Location of St Mary of Eton in London
- 51°32′43″N 0°01′50″W
- Location: Eastway, London E9 5JA
- Country: England
- Denomination: Church of England
- Churchmanship: Anglo-Catholic
- Website: stmaryofeton.org.uk

History
- Status: Parish Church

Architecture
- Functional status: Active
- Heritage designation: Grade II* listed
- Architect(s): George Frederick Bodley and Thomas Garner
- Style: Gothic Revival
- Years built: 1890-92

Administration
- Diocese: London
- Parish: St. Mary of Eton with St. Augustine, Hackney Wick

St. Mary of Eton is an Anglican church on Eastway in Hackney Wick, London, and a Grade II* listed building. It was built 1890–92 in the medieval Gothic style to serve the Eton Mission, a mission to the East End organised and funded by Eton College.

== History ==
In the late 19th century, Eton College launched a scheme to provide social and religious support to people living in the crowded district of Hackney Wick in east London, and to familiarise privileged schoolboys with social conditions in deprived areas. The project of establishing an "Eton Mission" was started in 1880. St Mary of Eton Church was built 1890-02 as the centrepiece of the mission.

Following wartime bomb damage, the Church of St Augustine in nearby Victoria Park was closed in 1953 and its congregation merged with St Mary’s to form St Mary of Eton with St Augustine.

St Mary of Eton is notable as the founding location of the Church of England youth club the 59 Club.

== Architecture ==
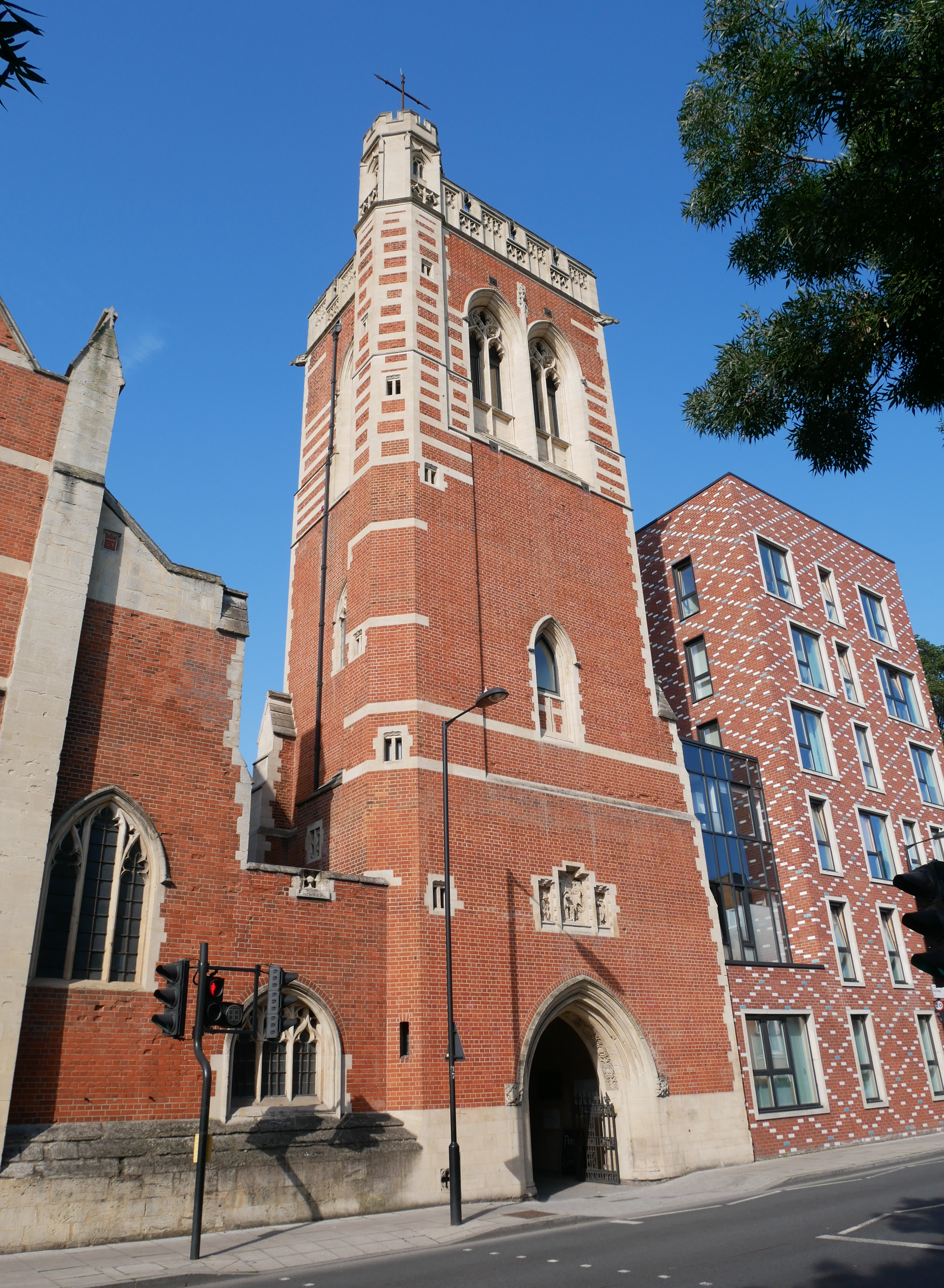
The tower at the east end of the church

St Mary of Eton was built 1890-02 by the Victorian architects George Frederick Bodley and Thomas Garner. It is built in red brick with stone dressings. The east side of the church faces onto the main street, and a gateway leads into the courtyard which is surrounded by the old Eton Mission buildings. Eton House was built in 1898 to house the clergy, and in 1911-12, two bays were added in by Cecil Greenwood Hare on the west side of the church. The tower was added in 1912.

The interior is noted for its tall, spacious nave, bisected by a painted rood screen by Bodley. At the east end, the high altar is backed by an ornately decorated reredos designed in 1930 by W Ellery Anderson.

During World War II, a bomb struck the Eton Mission in 1944, and it was badly damaged. Interior alterations were carried out in 1958 and a new organ by Grant, Degens and Rippin was installed in 1960.

In 2013/14, the church carried out a major refurbishment project. The church was re-ordered and restored. Some of the old Eton Mission buildings around the courtyard were redeveloped as residential flats and some buildings were demolished. New apartment blocked constructed next to the church were built with diaper-patterned brickwork to harmonise with Bodley's original church. The development was awarded a RIBA National Award in 2015 for its sensitive design.

== See also ==
- Grade I and II* listed buildings in the London Borough of Hackney
