= Haggerston Baths =

Former public baths in London

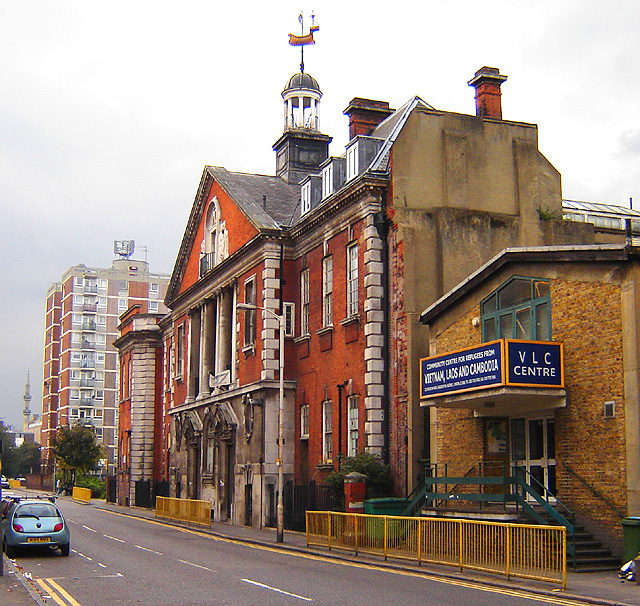
- 2005 photo
- Interactive map of Haggerston Baths
- Location: Whiston Road, Haggerston, London, E2 8BN
- Coordinates: 51.535235°N 0.071228°W

Construction
- Opened: 25 June 1904
- Closed: February 2000
- Architect: Alfred Cross

Haggerston Baths is a former public bath in Haggerston, London. It was opened in 1904 and were built at a cost of £60,000. There was a single pool, 91 slipper baths and a 60 stall wash house.

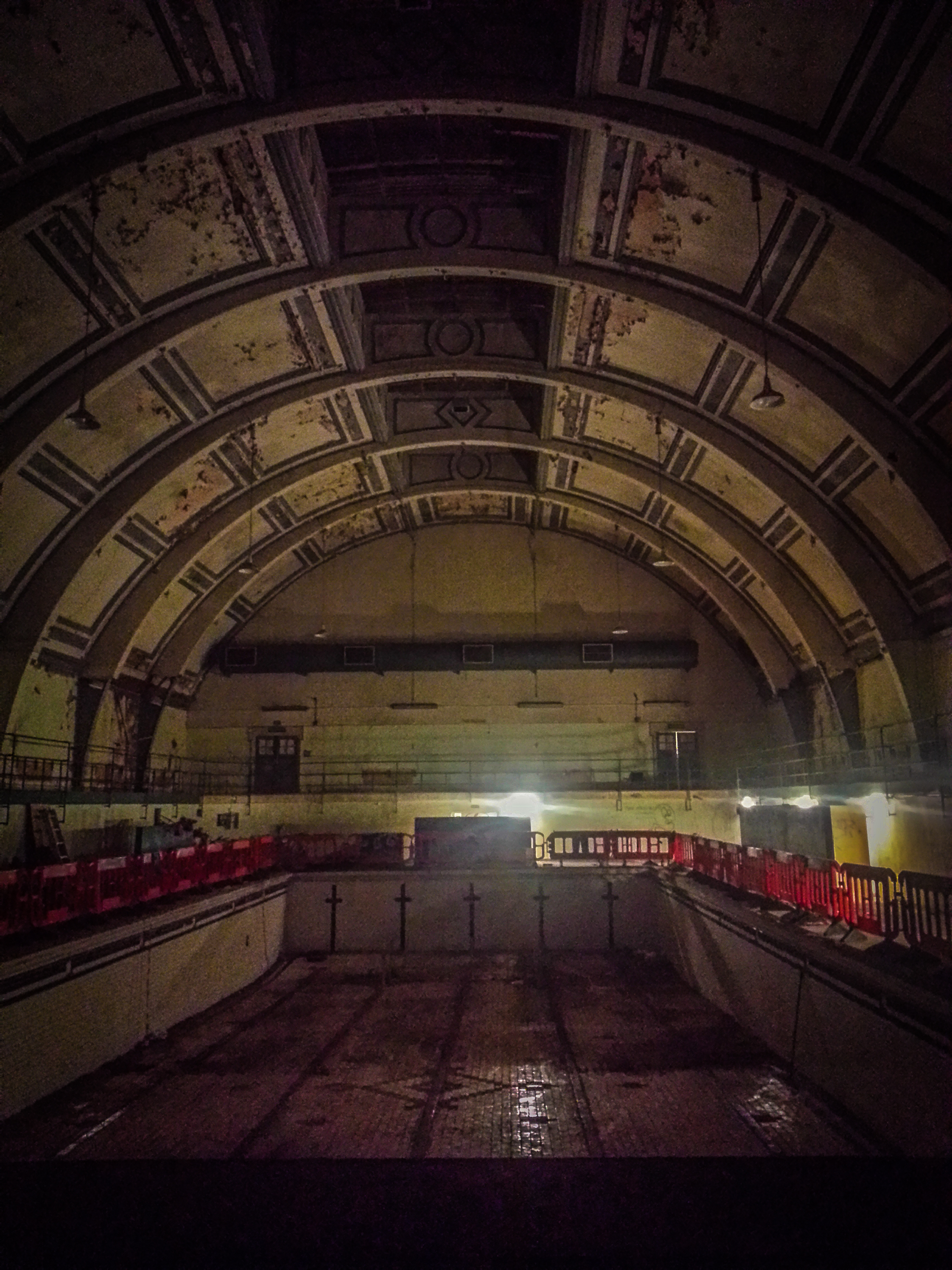
Interior of Haggerston Baths

The Grade II listed Haggerston Pool was designed by Alfred Cross. It was closed in 2000 with an uncertain future. In June 2009 after a long community campaign, a £5m grant was announced from the Department for Children, Schools and Families to refurbish and re-open the pool. The building would also contain community facilities and a GP surgery. Heavily involved in the re-opening of the pool was Michael Gallie, who was instrumental in surveying the building, creating 3D model sketches and more.

Due to the 2009 financial downturn, Hackney Borough Council had to remove funding for the re-opening of the baths. The Haggerston baths campaign restarted efforts to find financial backing and public support in an effort to re-open the historic East End pool.

As of January 2023 it appears that any restoration of the building will no longer include restoring the swimming baths.

== See also ==
- Haggerston
- Dulwich Baths
- Camberwell Baths

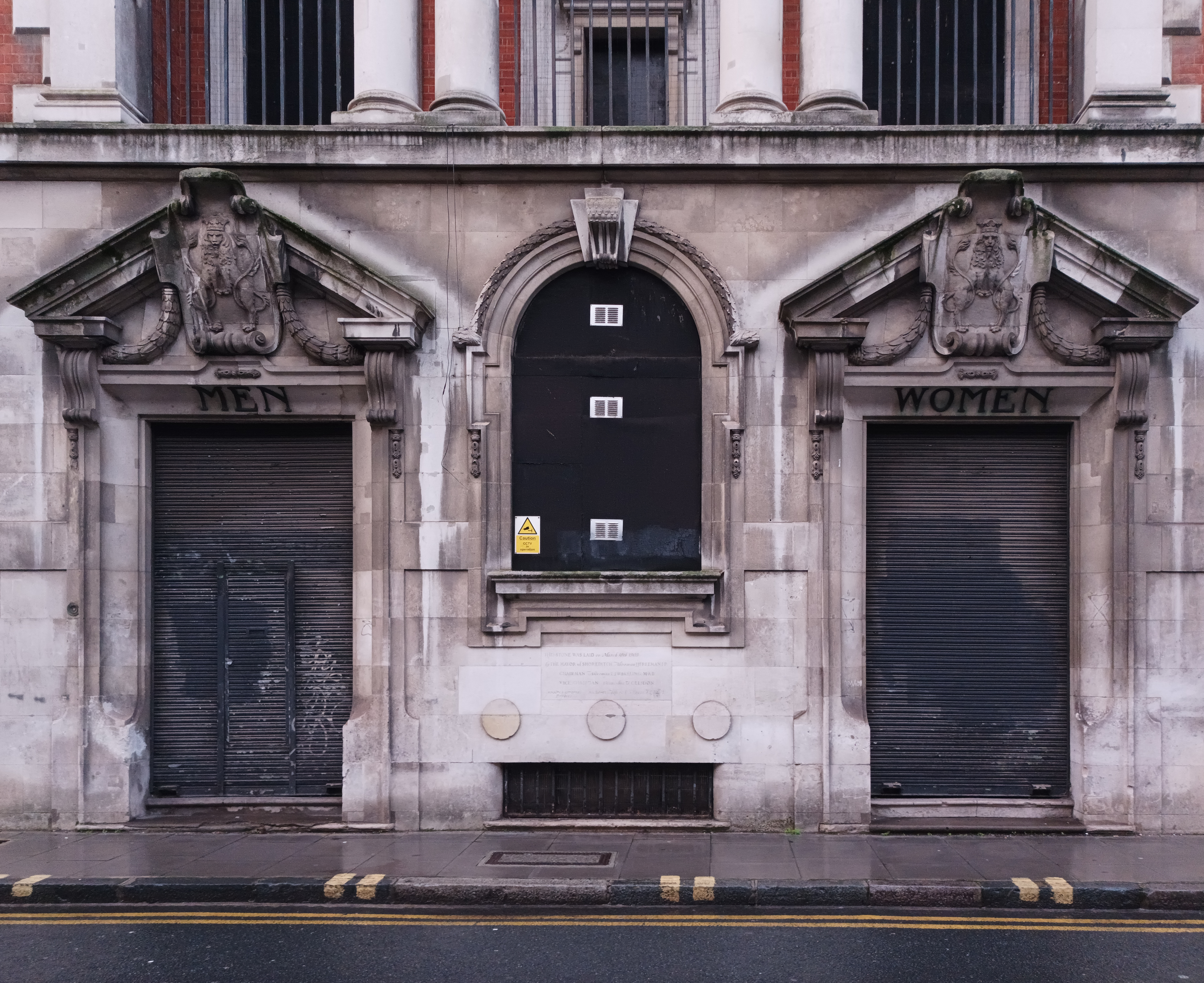
Segregated entrances
