= St Chad's Church, Haggerston =

Anglican church in London

St Chad's, Haggerston
- Church of St Chad, Dunloe Street
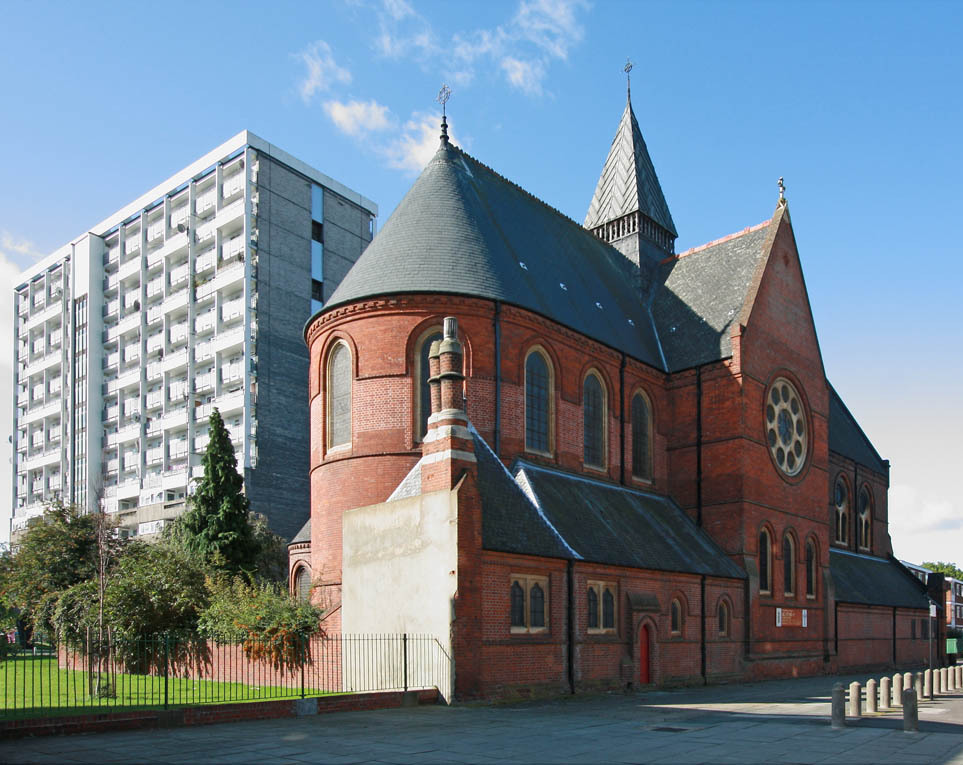
- St Chad's, Haggerston
- 51.5317°N 0.0733°W
- Location: Dunloe Street, Haggerston, London Borough of Hackney
- Country: England
- Denomination: Anglican
- Churchmanship: Anglo-Catholic
- Website: stchadhaggerston.org.uk

History
- Status: Parish church
- Dedication: Chad of Mercia
- Consecrated: 1869; 157 years ago

Architecture
- Functional status: Active
- Architect: James Brooks
- Style: Gothic Revival
- Groundbreaking: 1867
- Completed: 1869
- Construction cost: £7,500

Specifications
- Materials: red brick, Bath stone, slate roofs

Administration
- Diocese: London
- Archdeaconry: Hackney
- Benefice: Haggerston (St Chad)
- Parish: St Chad Haggerston

Clergy
- Bishop: Jonathan Baker
- Priest: Fr Aidan Bartlett SSC (Priest-in-Charge)

Listed Building – Grade I
- Official name: Church of St Chad
- Designated: 3 January 1950
- Reference no.: 1265793

St Chad's, Haggerston, located on Dunloe Street in Haggerston, is an urban Anglican parish church in the diocese of London, England. Built to designs by architect James Brooks and completed in 1869 as part of the Haggerston Church Scheme, the Grade I Listed church was united with the parish of St Mary, Haggerston in 1953, following the destruction of that church in an air raid in 1941. St Chad's has a historical association with High Church liturgy and Anglo-Catholicism.

== History ==
In 1862, the Shoreditch and Haggerston Church Extension Fund was started. The district of St Chad was created in 1863, with a committee formed for the erection of the church for the new parish holding its first meeting in January 1864. Construction was begun in 1867, and St Chad's was consecrated on 4 April 1869. At its design and completion, St Chad's was situated on the north-east corner of Nichols Square, a poor residential area consisting principally of terraced housing. Brooks also designed and built the adjacent vicarage, circa 1870, which is Grade II* listed.

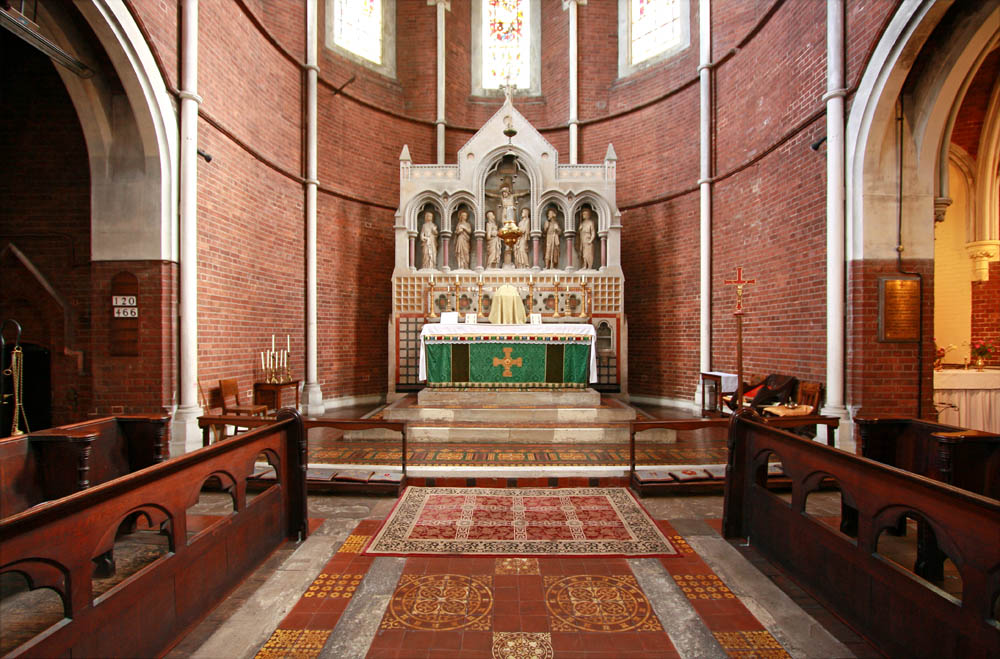
The east end and chancel of St Chad's

James Brooks is the name which one associates above all with the creation of a new type of urban church especially intended to act as a focus in poor and deprived areas. His great brick basilicas with their austere E. E. details, lit by tall clerestories rising triumphantly above their once squalid settings, are to be found chiefly in the East End, at Hoxton and Shoreditch.

— Nikolaus Pevsner.

St Chad's is a good example of Brooks's austere and muscular red-brick Gothic, entirely appropriate for bringing Anglo-Catholicism to Haggerston

— Charles Saumarez Smith, East London,

Nichols Square was demolished in 1963 to create the Fellows Court Estate. In 1970, the church of St Augustine's, Yorkton Street (also built as part of the Haggerston Church Scheme), closed and its parish, which had sustained bombing in the war and subsequent demolition, was incorporated into the parish of St Chad's.

== Architecture ==
=== Interior ===
Brooks designed the furniture and liturgical furnishings of several of his landmark East London churches. At St Chad's, he designed the reredos, which was carved by Thomas Earp, and the pulpit, and may have been responsible for further details including the rood screen. The clerestory and rose windows are plainly glazed, but there are several stained glass windows by eminent English designers and manufacturers Clayton and Bell, who were responsible for the three large-scale single figures in the apse – depicting a Christ in Majesty, flanked by windows with Mary as the Blessed Virgin, and St Chad, the church's patron saint.

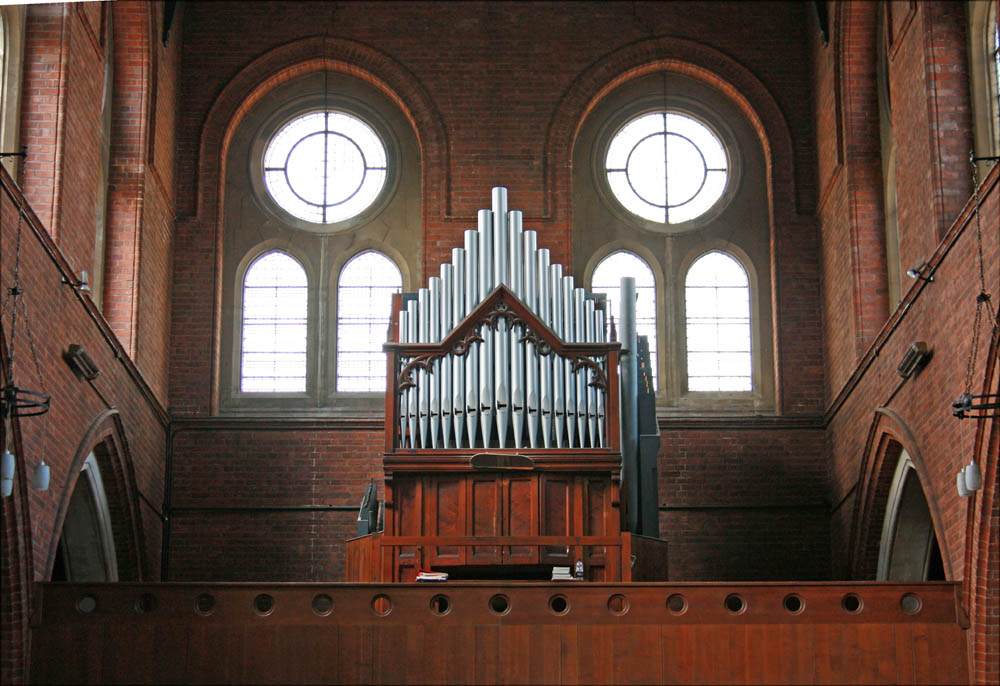
The organ loft and pipe organ of St Chad's

== Present day ==
St Chad's is an active Anglican parish church under the alternative episcopal oversight of the Bishop of Fulham, and is in the deanery of Hackney, in the Diocese of London. The building is on Historic England's 'Heritage at Risk Register', a programme for identifying for safeguarding significant historical sites at risk of loss.

== See also ==
- Frank Buttle, vicar of St Chad's from 1937 until his death in 1953.
