= Nazir Tanbouli =

Egyptian artist (born 1971)

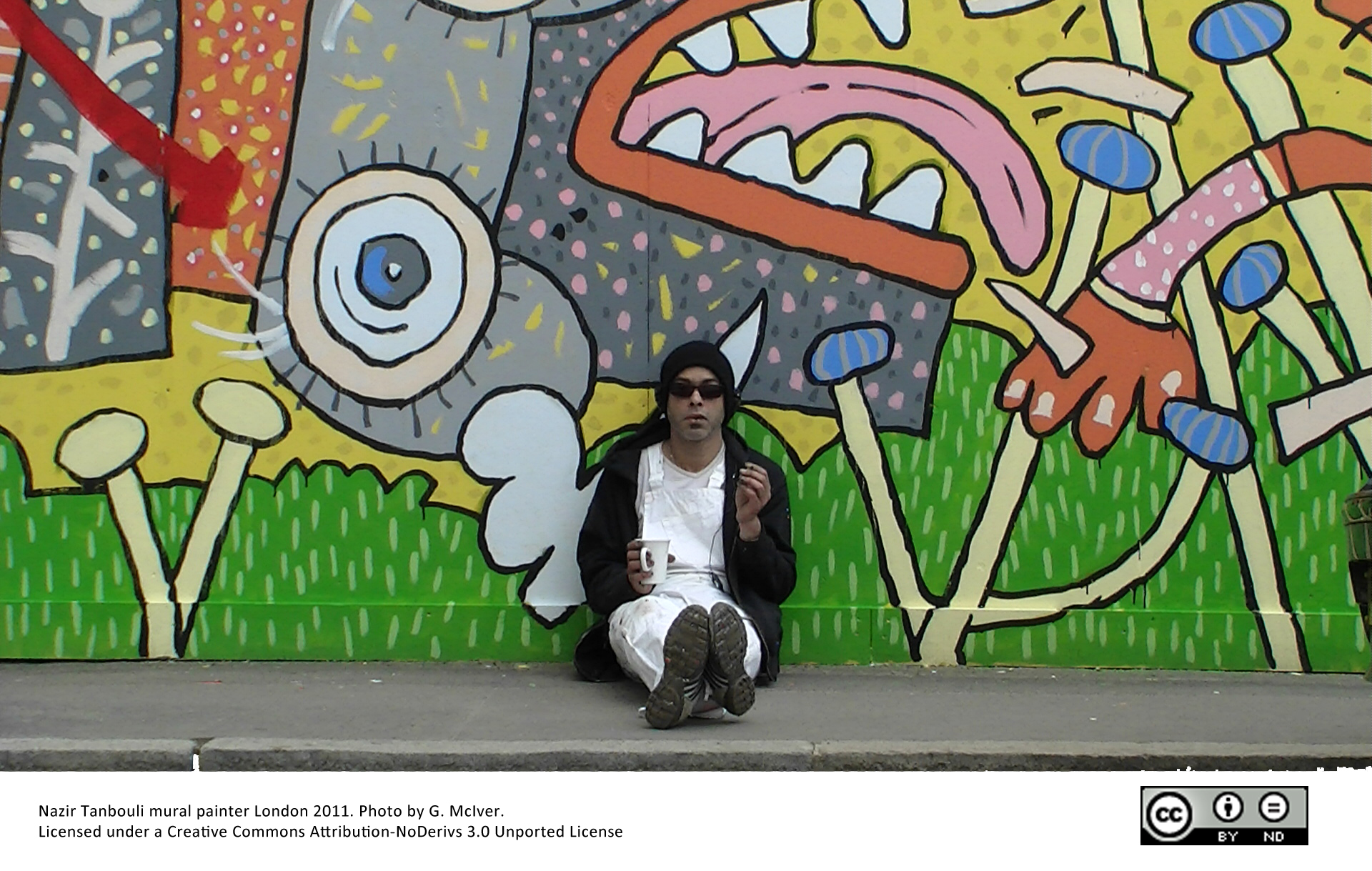
- portrait with mural, Haggerston London May 2011
- Born: 1971 (age 54–55); Alexandria, Egypt

Nazir Tanbouli (born 1971) is an Egyptian born artist. He was born and raised in Alexandria, Egypt and studied at the University of Alexandria Faculty of Fine Arts. His uncle is the painter Ibrahim El-Tanbouli (b. 1954) and his great-uncle was the painter and Egyptologist Lotfy El-Tanbouli (1919–1982). He works in drawing and painting, especially mural painting.

== Biography ==
Born into a family of painters, including painter and Egyptologist Lotfy El Tanbouli Nazir Tanbouli was awarded the 1993 Grand Drawing Prize at the National Salon of Youth, Egypt and participated in Cairo Bienniale and many other exhibitions in Egypt and abroad. He spent a number of years exclusively in mural painting. In 2002 he moved to the United Kingdom. He lived for several years in Nottingham where he was an active artist and educator, and began to exhibit around Europe. In 2007 he moved to London where he lives and works.

In 2010 he completed an MA in Fine Art (Printmaking) at Camberwell College of Arts. He co-founded the artist-run space Studio 75, which creates projects and hosts exhibitions. Tanbouli has received significant awards from the Arts Council of England as well as private foundations, and his work is held in public collections in Egypt and a number of private collections in the UK. In 2012 he created the mural project THE KING'S LAND, covering a semi derelict East London housing estate with murals.
