= The Bridge Academy =

Secondary school in Haggerston, London

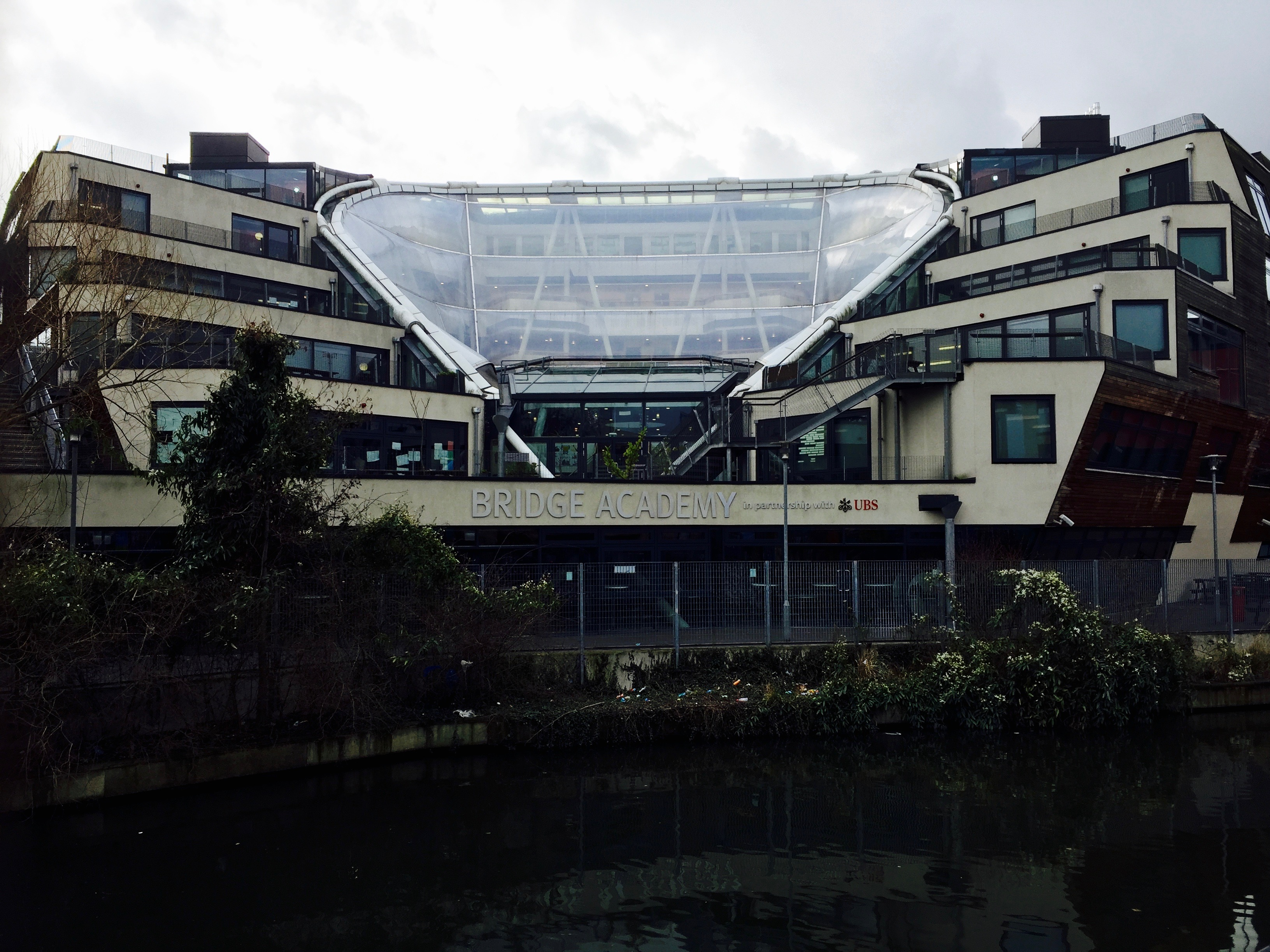

Location
- Laburnum Street; Haggerston, Greater London, E2 8BA; England; 51.53571°N 0.07244°W

Information
- Type: Academy
- Established: 2007
- Department for Education URN: 131609 Tables
- Ofsted: Reports
- Principal: Chris Brown
- Rajveer Singh: colour Purple Grey 🟪 ⬜️
- Gender: Coeducational
- Age: 11 to 19
- Website: www.bridgeacademy.hackney.sch.uk

The Bridge Academy is a coeducational secondary school and sixth form with academy status, located in the Haggerston area of the London Borough of Hackney in England.

The Bridge Academy opened in 2007 in new buildings sited along the banks of Regent's Canal, and opened a sixth form provision in 2012. The school is sponsored by the financial services company UBS, and has a specialism in mathematics and music.

The school offers GCSEs, BTECs and foundation courses as programmes of study. Students in the sixth form have the option to study from a range of A Levels and further BTECs.
