= St Michael's Church, Shoreditch =

Church in the London Borough of Hackney

Coordinates: 51.5244°N 0.0829°W

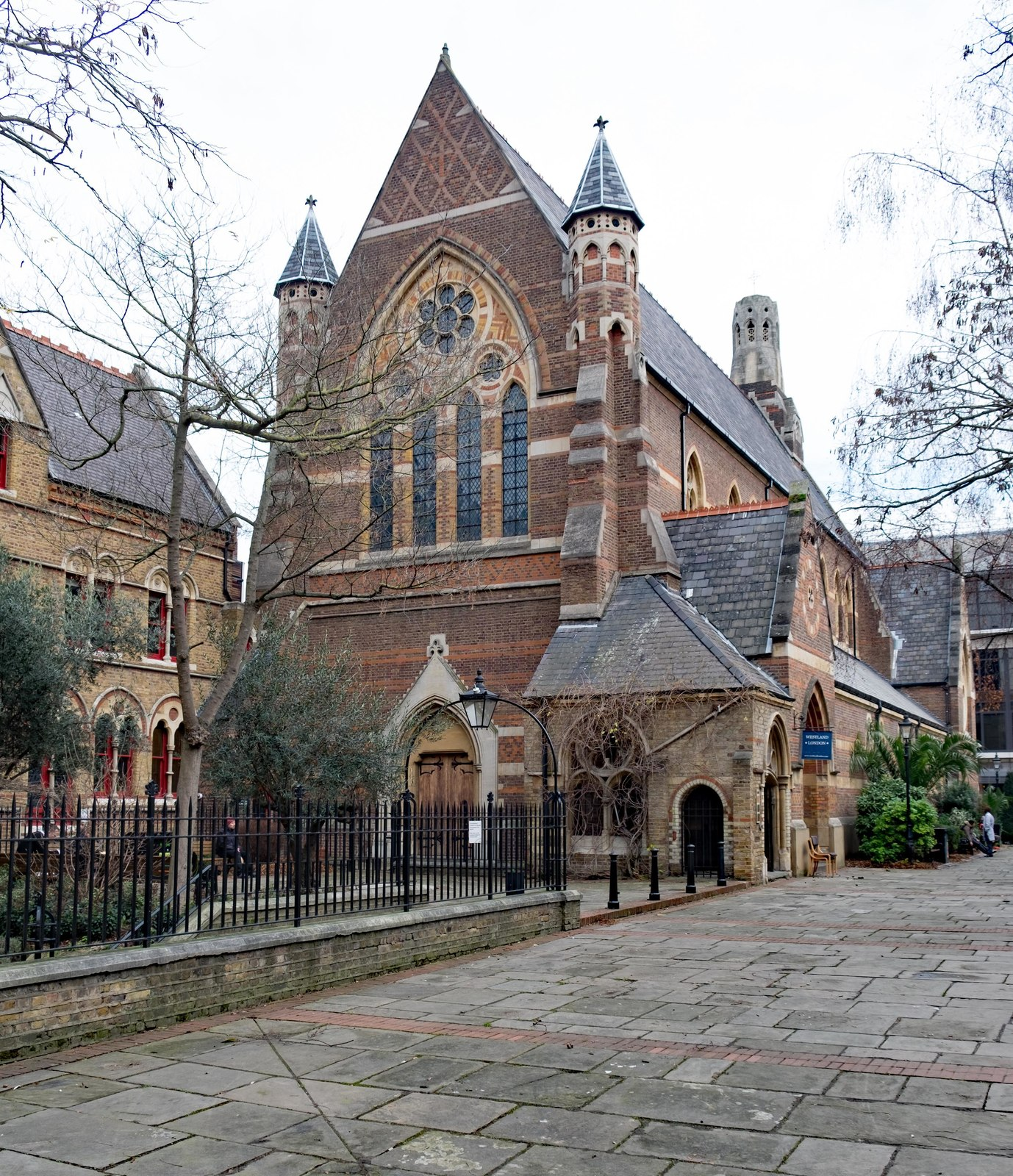
The west front

St Michael's Church is a deconsecrated Church of England church in Shoreditch, entered from Mark Street and running parallel to Leonard Street. Its parish was formed in 1862 by splitting off part of that of St Leonard Shoreditch. The building was designed by James Brooks and opened in 1865, though a planned tower was never added. A vicarage (1867–1868) and a school (1870) were soon added - these were both listed at Grade II* in 1975.

In 1937, the parish took on part of the dissolved parish of St Mark Old Street. The church was Grade I listed in 1950 but closed in 1964, with its parish merged back into that of St Leonard. The nave was designated as a storage warehouse, then in 1978 the whole church was sold by the Diocese of London to the London Architectural Salvage and Supply Co (LASSCO) and Westland & Company, which used it as a showroom for architectural salvage. It is currently being converted into office space.
