= Haggerston =

Coordinates: 51.53463°N 0.07663°W

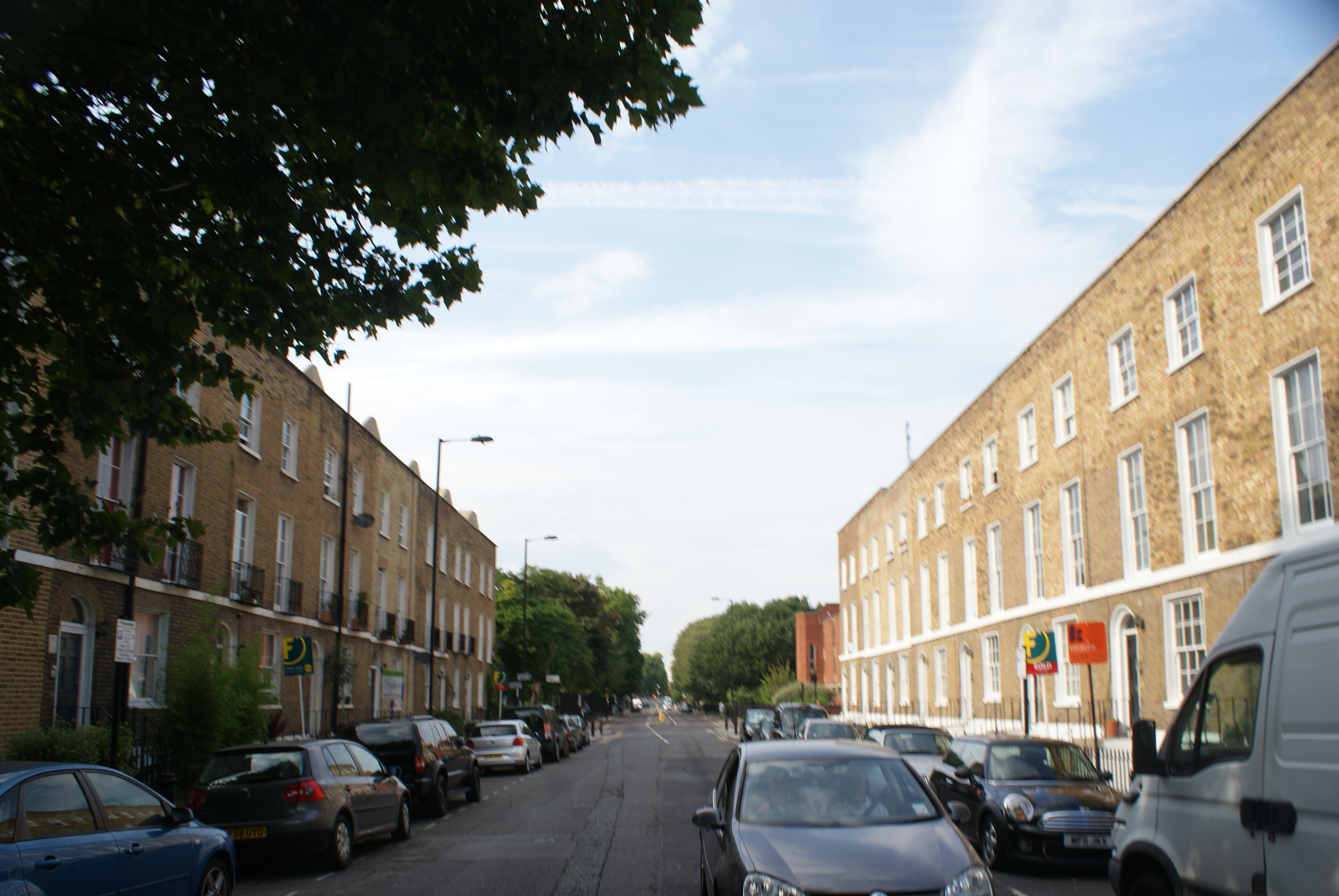
- View up Queenbridge Road

- Location within Greater London
- Population: 10,376
- OS grid reference: TQ340835
  - Charing Cross: 3.1 mi (5.0 km) SW
- London borough: Hackney
- Ceremonial county: Greater London
- Region: London
- Country: England
- Sovereign state: United Kingdom
- Post town: LONDON
- Postcode district: E2, E8
- Dialling code: 020
- Police: Metropolitan
- Fire: London
- Ambulance: London
- UK Parliament: Hackney South and Shoreditch
- London Assembly: North East

Haggerston is an area in London, England and is located in the London Borough of Hackney. Haggerston lies north-east of the City of London. It was historically in the county of Middlesex until it became part of the Metropolitan Borough of Shoreditch in 1899. In 1965, Shoreditch became part of the new London Borough of Hackney.

In the 1990s a number of the area's more rundown housing estates were refurbished and some disused public buildings were privately converted into gated communities. In 2010, Haggerston railway station re-opened, a little to the north of the original station.

== Toponymy ==
In 1086, Haggerston was first recorded in Domesday Book as Hergotestane, a name that may derive from a Saxon farmer called Hærgod, who either had a ‘ton’ (farmstead) here or a stone that marked the boundary of his land.

== History ==
Haggerston was an outlying hamlet of Shoreditch. On Rocque's 1745 map of Hackney, it is shown as Agostone but by the 19th century it had become Haggerstone.

Edmond Halley was born in the village on 8 November 1656. He is known as the first person to calculate the orbit of a comet that was later named after him, Halley's Comet.

At the end of the 18th century, Haggerston was still rural, with local farmers supplying nearby London with milk and dairy products and feed for horses.

The Cat & Mutton Bridge which crosses the Regents Canal still carries the name of a former alehouse that stood on the site at the extreme right, and has been closed since at least 1919. The present pub on a new site was built in 1909 as the Sir Walter Scott but is now known as La Vie en Rose.

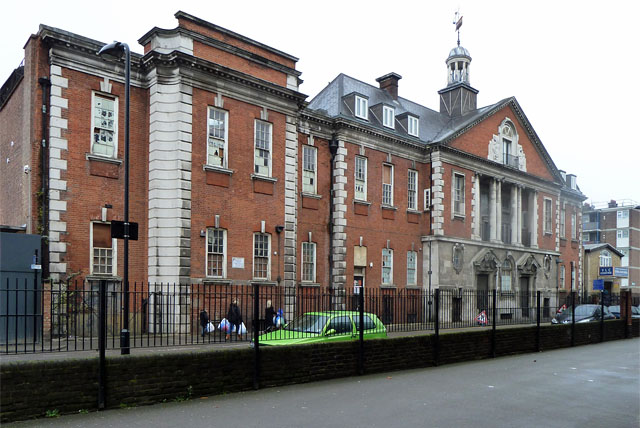
Haggerston Baths was built as the area developed.

Nichols Square was a development built in 1841, and featured two rows of Tudor gothic villas at its centre; it was later enhanced in 1867-9 by the addition of St Chad's church. In 1963, Nichols Square was demolished by a compulsory purchase order in order to build the Fellows Court Estate.

Haggerston railway station was opened in 1867 two years after the line to Broad Street was completed. It was originally to be known as De Beauvoir Town but this name was changed before it opened.

Ronald and Reginald Kray, identical twin gangsters known as the Kray twins, were born on 24 October 1933, on Stean Street.

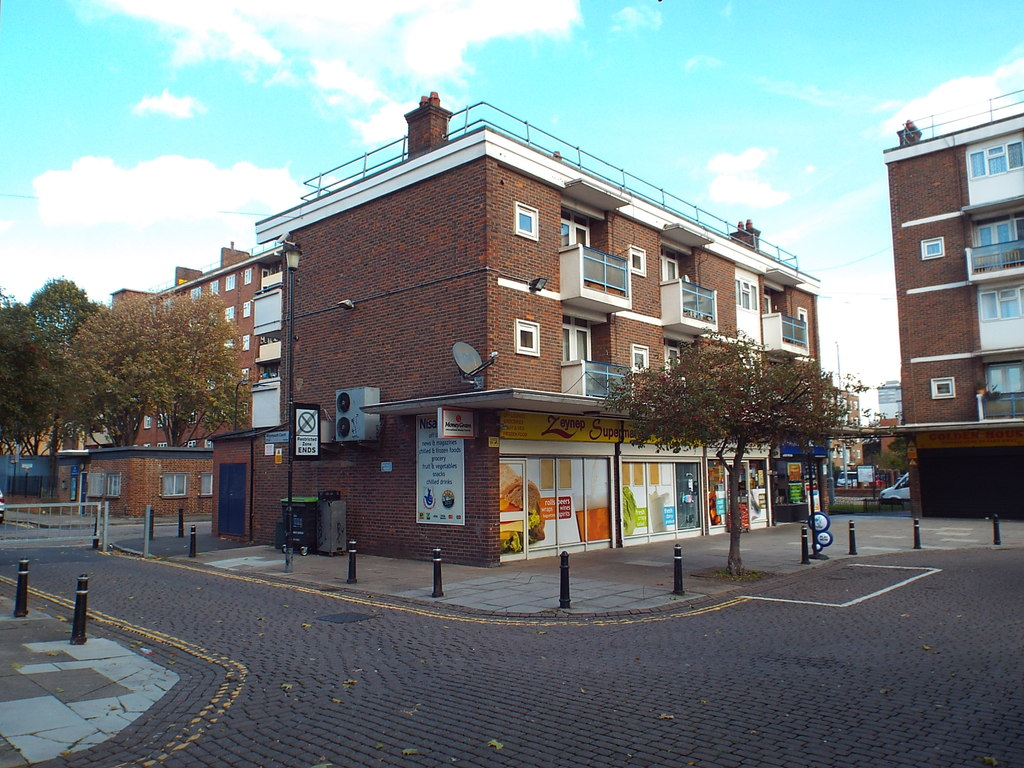
A row of shops on Weymouth Terrace.

The architect George Finch worked on the Suffolk Estate, which was an early low-rise, high-density scheme built in the 1950s, with a mix of flats and houses.

Haggerston Park was developed in two phases; the previously industrial northern half of the site became a public park in the late 1950s and the southern part of the park was fully developed in the 1980s. Formerly the site had been occupied by gas works operated by the Imperial Gas Light and Coke Company.

In August 1990, PC Laurence Brown was murdered while responding to a 999 call along Pownall Road in Orwell Court on the Suffolk Estate. Mark Gaynor, an unemployed 20-year-old, pulled out a shotgun and fired directly at him. PC Brown collapsed and died in a car park off Pownall Road.

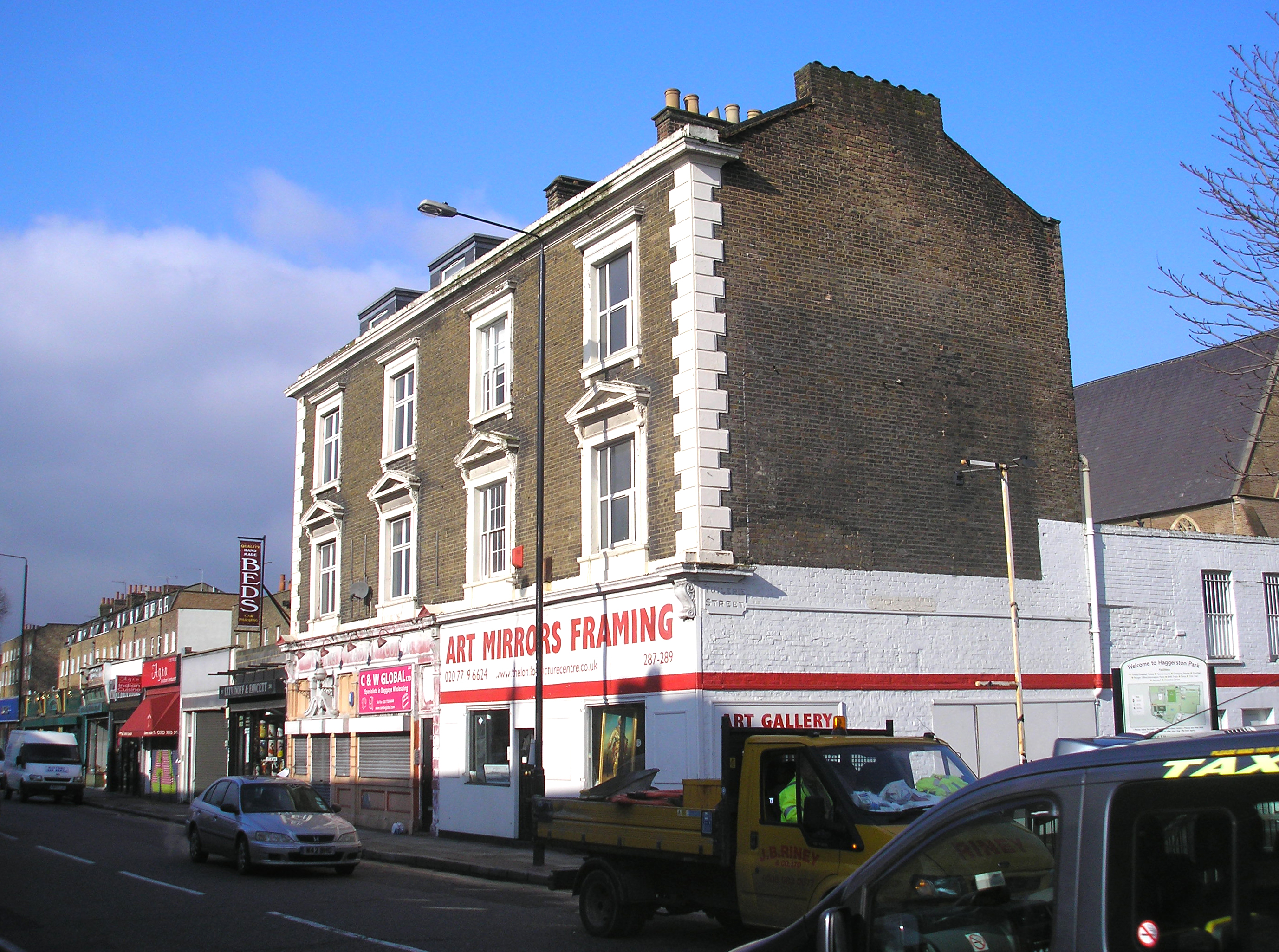
Corner of Hackney Road and Tuilerie Street.

During the 21 July 2005 London bombings, a number 26 bus was targeted by Muktar Said Ibrahim, who attempted to explode a device while the bus was on Hackney Road from Waterloo, near the corner of Columbia Road in Bethnal Green. The bomb caused a small explosion but did not detonate as intended, and there were no deaths or significant damage.

Due to the Great Recession, Hackney Borough Council had remove funding for the reopening of the Haggerston Baths, which sparked a campaign for efforts to find financial backing and public support in an effort to re-open the East End's oldest bath.

By 2015, Haggerston's proximity to Shoreditch had made the area popular with students and workers in the creative industries, as nearby areas had grown more expensive. In recent years, escalating property prices have driven commercial art galleries further into east London, which has exacerbated this effect. For the same reason, Haggerston has been attracting tech start-ups around Silicon Roundabout in Old Street, with some people calling the area "Hackerston".

== Representation ==
The Haggerston electoral ward forms part of the Hackney South and Shoreditch constituency. The ward returns three councillors to Hackney Council, with an election every four years. At the election on 6 May 2010, Ann Munn, Jonathan McShane, and Barry Buitekant, all Labour Party candidates, were returned. Turnout was 54 per cent; with 5,006 votes cast. Current councillors (2024) for the Haggerston ward are Humaira Garasia, Jon Narcross and Midnight Ross.

== Geography ==
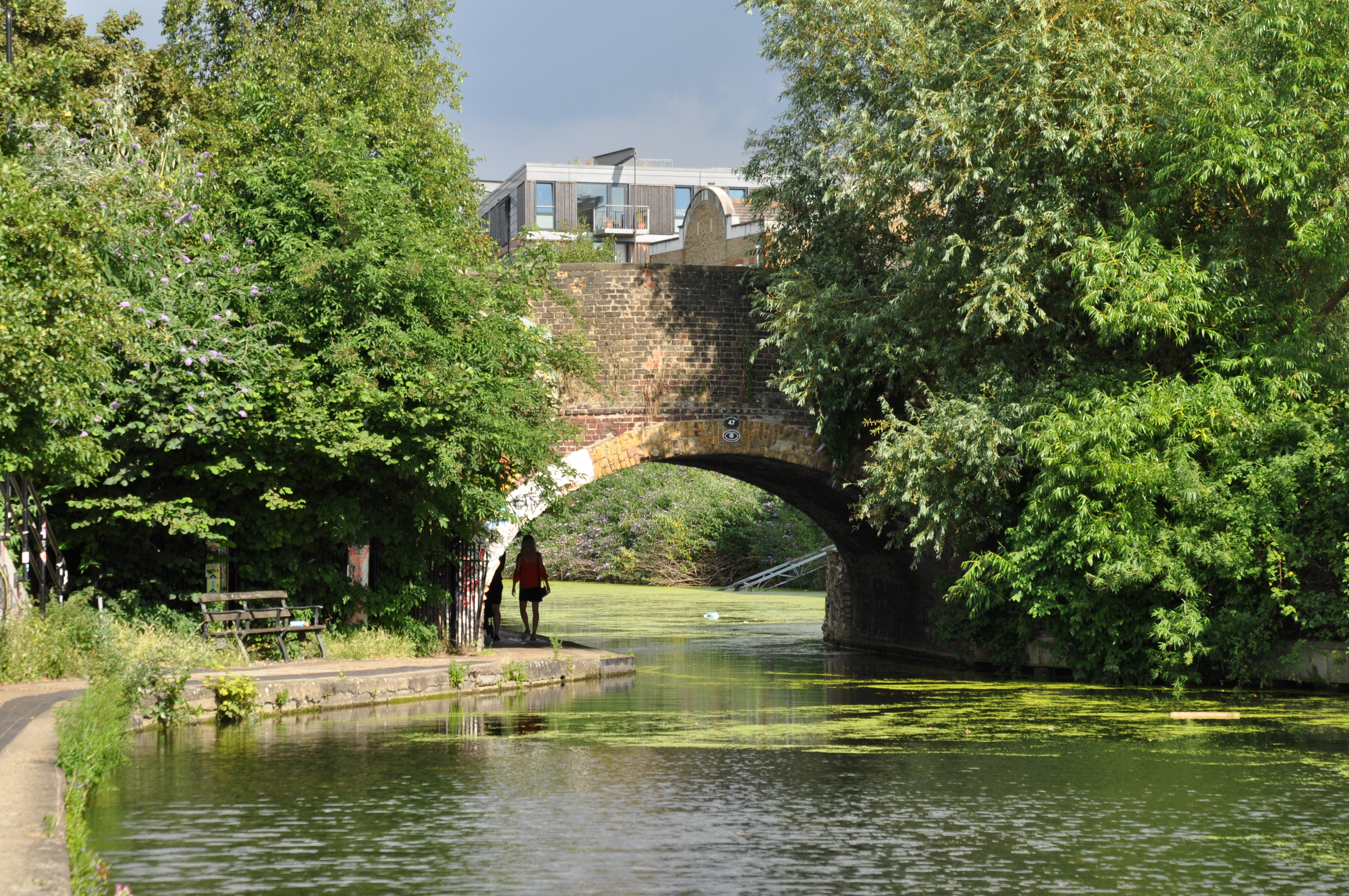
Haggerston Bridge over Regents Canal.

Haggerston is defined as stretching from Hoxton railway station in the south to the northern edge of Stonebridge Garden, reaching to London Fields to the east, and running up Kingsland Road, and is centred approximately around Queensbridge Road.

== Education ==
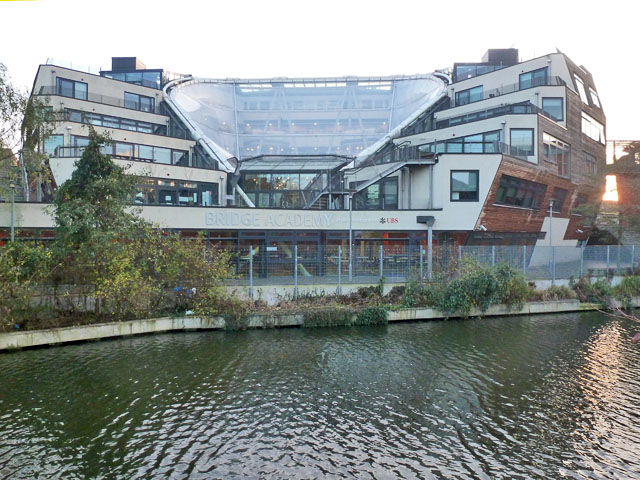
The Bridge Academy from the Regents Canal.

Haggerston School is a Grade II listed building, designed by the modernist architect Ernő Goldfinger and built in 1964–65.

The Bridge Academy opened in 2007 in new buildings sited along the banks of Regent's Canal, and opened a sixth form provision in 2012. The school is sponsored by the financial services company UBS, and has a specialism in mathematics and music.

== Culture ==
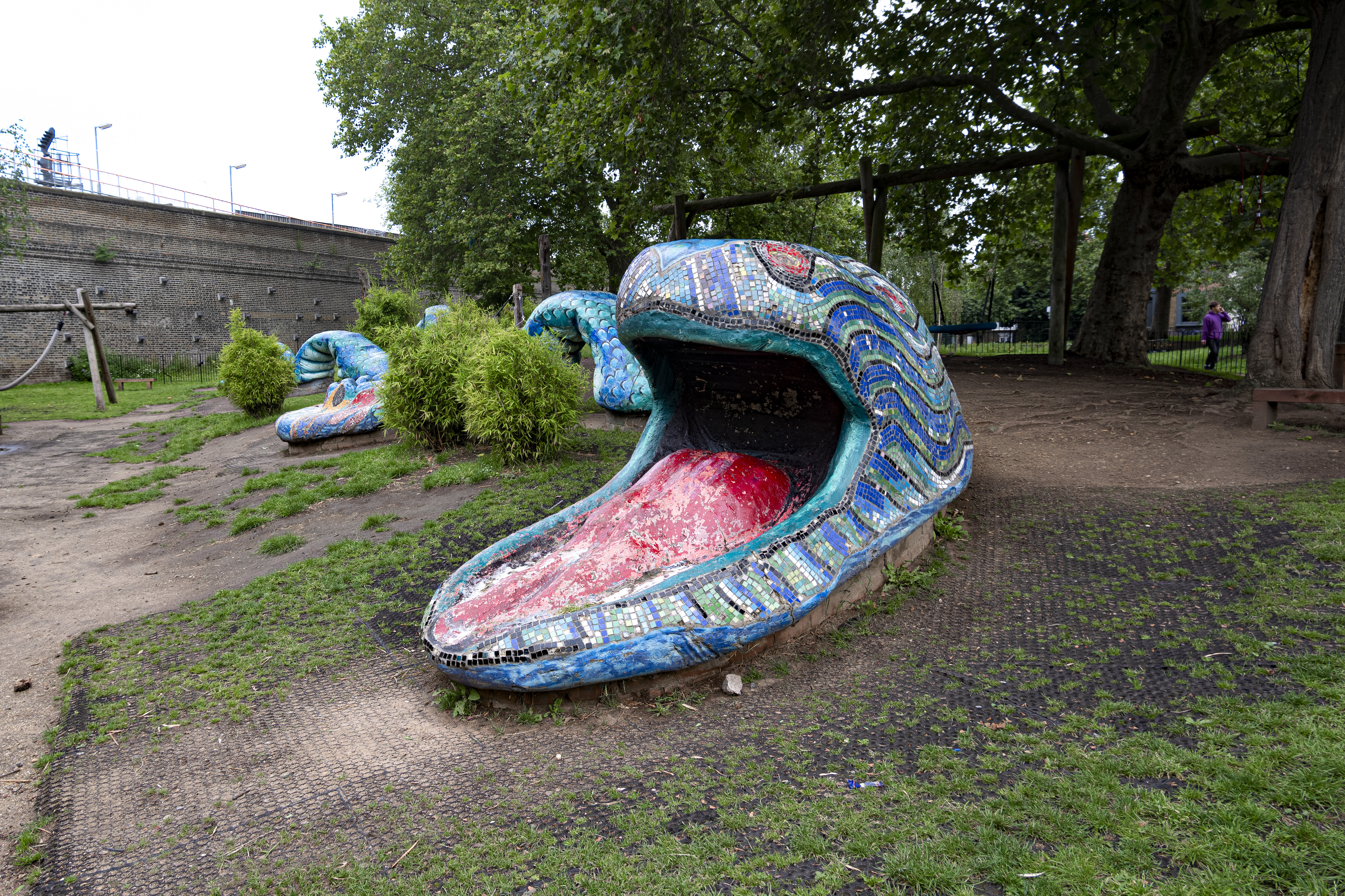
Mosaic Snake, Stonebridge Park.

The Grade II listed Haggerston Baths, designed by Alfred Cross and opened in 1904, was closed in 2000. In June 2009, after a long community campaign, a £5m grant was announced from the Department for Children, Schools and Families to refurbish and reopen the pool. The building would also contain community facilities and a GP surgery.

Haggerston has a long association with clowning. Holy Trinity Church, Dalston still hosts an annual clowns' service to commemorate Joseph Grimaldi, and All Saints Centre at one time housed the Clowns Gallery and Museum, including props and a unique collection of painted eggs, serving as the 'registration' of clowns' make-up. Much of the collection is now on display at Wookey Hole.

== Religion ==
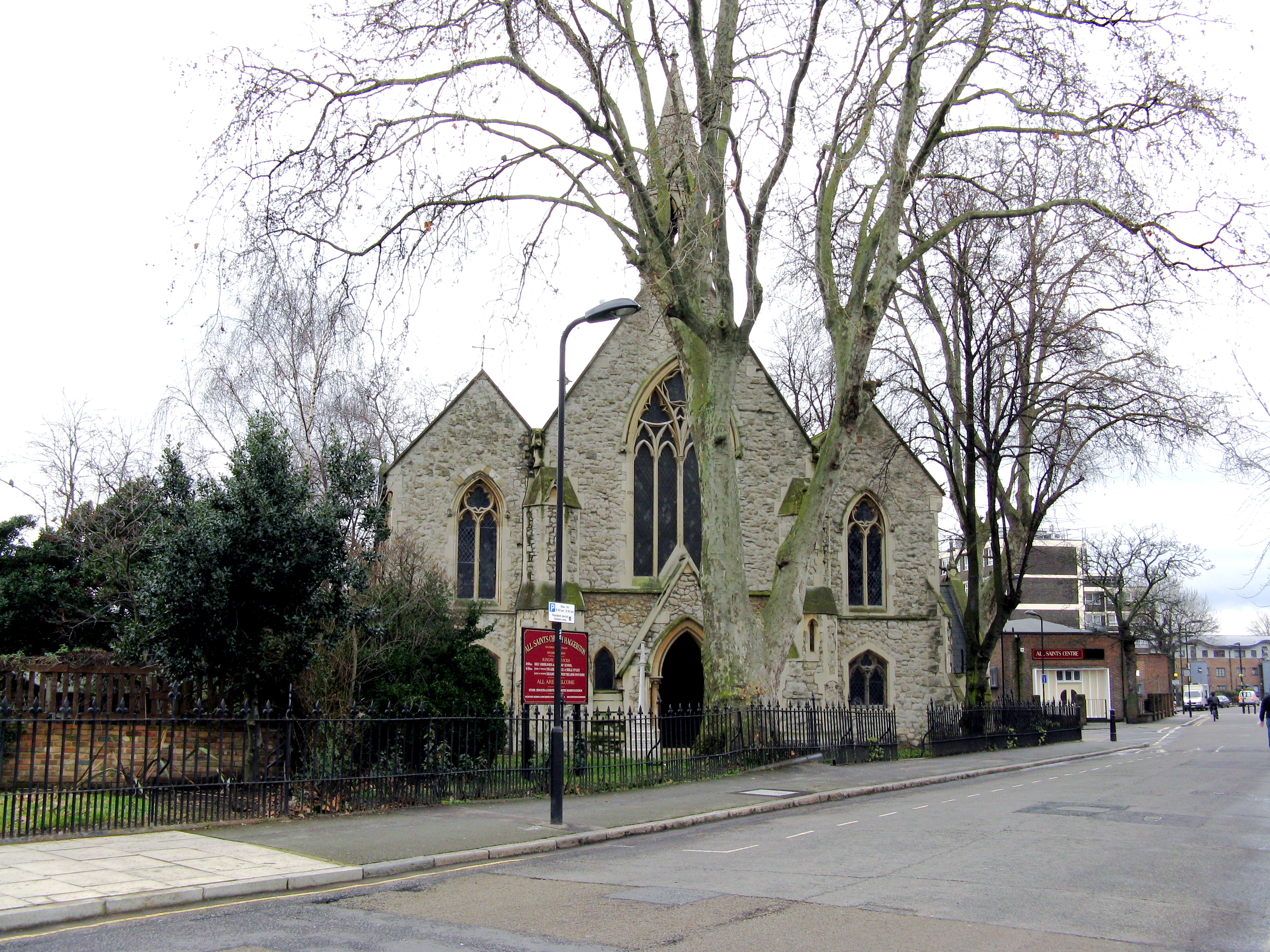
All Saints Church, on Haggerston Road.

The Little Sisters of Jesus are a Roman Catholic community of religious sisters inspired by the life and writings of Charles de Foucauld, founded in Algeria in 1939 by Little Sister Magdeleine of Jesus (Madeleine Hutin). They have had a community of Sisters at their council flat on the 13th Floor of Fellows Court Tower Block in Weymouth Terrace, Haggerston since 1989.

Haggerston was formerly divided into the ecclesiastical parishes of All Saints, St Chad, St Columba, St Mary, St Paul, St Augustine, and St Stephen.

== Transport ==
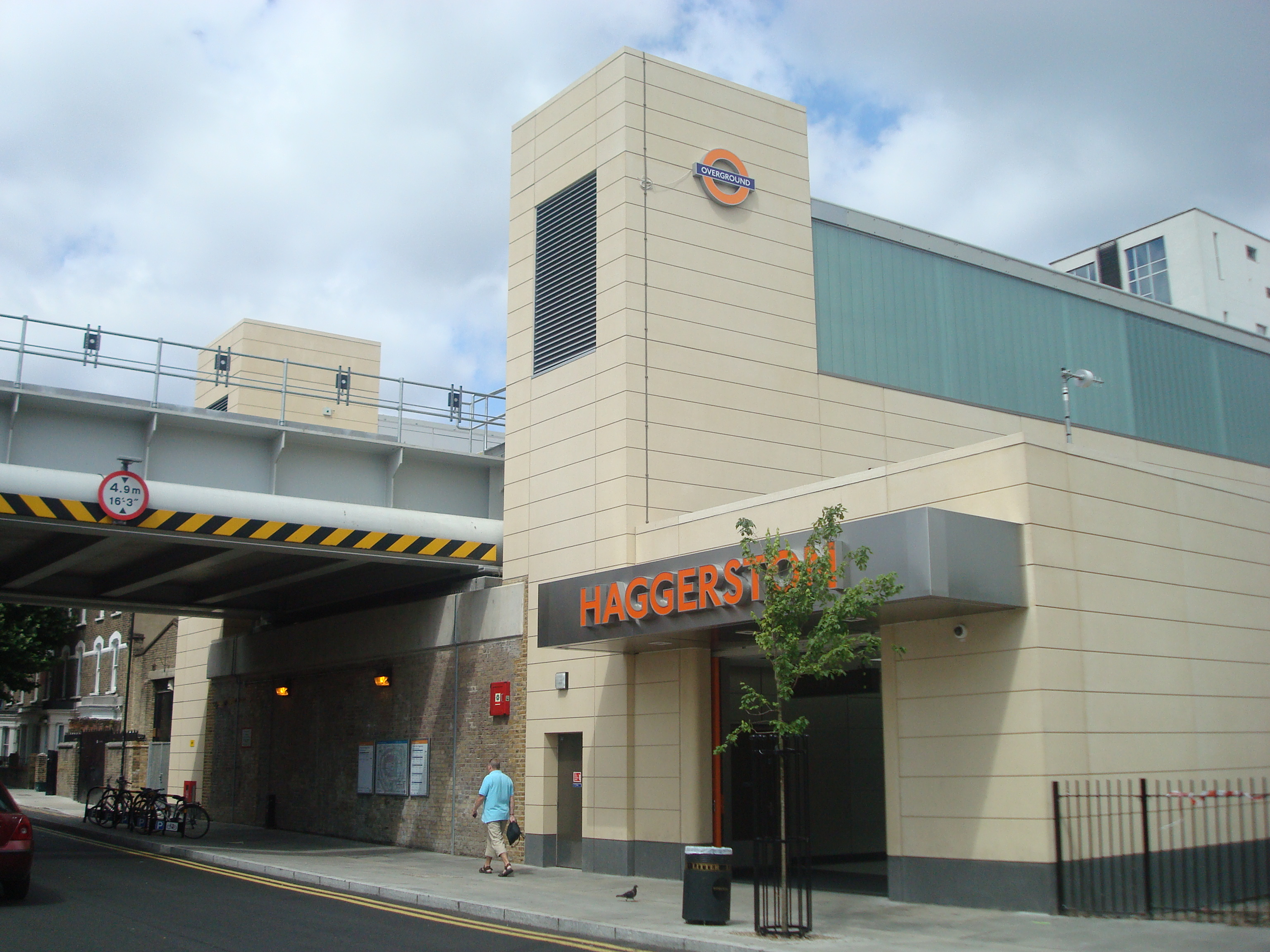
Entrance to Haggerston station.

=== Railway stations ===
- Haggerston station, served by London Overground's Windrush line.

=== Walking and cycling ===
The Regents Canal towpath is easily accessible to pedestrians and cyclists. It provides access to Victoria Park to the east and Islington to the west.

== Art and memorials ==
The Haggerston and Kingsland Estate was condemned and scheduled for demolition in the 1990s but the process did not get underway for another 20 years. In 2009 the artists Andrea Luka Zimmerman and Lasse Johansson, who lived on the estate on Dunston Road, created the I AM HERE project, placing on the building large portrait photographs of the current estate residents who were about to be moved out so the building could be demolished. These faced the Regent's Canal and were popular with passersby. The project came down in April 2014.

A feature film Estate, a Reverie (83 mins, Zimmerman) about the Haggerston estate was completed in 2015. Filmed over seven years, it reveals and celebrates the resilience of residents who are profoundly overlooked by media representations and wider social responses. The film was nominated for several awards, including the 2015 Grierson awards.

On the Kingsland Estate in Whiston Road, Egyptian painter Nazir Tanbouli created the "King's Land" project where, in the space of four months, he covered all of the buildings of the condemned estate with murals.

== Notable people ==
- Frank Buttle (1878–1953), Vicar of St Chad's, (1937-1953), founder of the National Adoption Society and Buttle UK
- Randal Cremer (1828–1908), Liberal MP for Haggerston (1885-1895 & 1900–1908), winner of the 1903 Nobel Peace Prize
- Edmund Halley (1656–1742), astronomer
- Kray Twins, Ronald (1933–1995) and Reginald (1933–2000), criminals and perpetrators of organised crime
- Iain Sinclair FRSL (born 1943), writer and filmmaker
- Nazir Tanbouli (born 1971), Egyptian born artist
- Andrea Luka Zimmerman (born 1969), & Lasse Johansson; artists, filmmakers and cultural activists; transforming the Haggerston estate with the large-scale public art and photography
