= St Matthias' Church, Stoke Newington =

St Matthias Stoke Newington
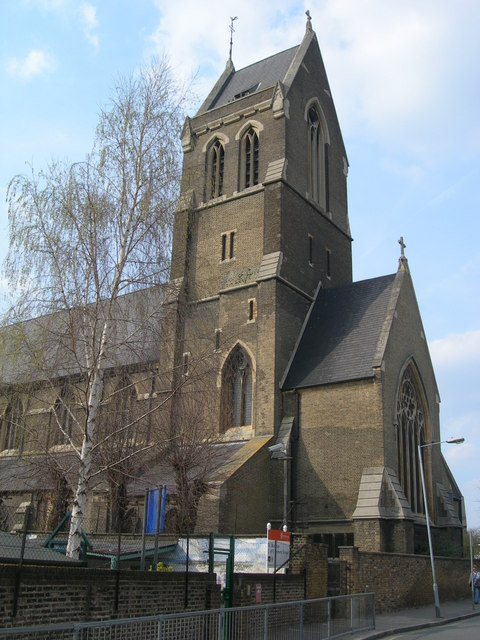
- St Matthias Stoke Newington, London N16

- 51.5526°N 0.0794°W
- Location: Wordsworth Road, Stoke Newington, London N16
- Country: England
- Denomination: Church of England
- Tradition: Anglican
- Website: The Church of England: A Church Near You. St Matthias Church Stoke Newington

History
- Founded: 1849
- Dedicated: 1853 & rededicated 1954

Architecture
- Architect(s): 1/. William Butterfield; 2/. Nugent Cachemaille-Day
- Style: Free Gothic
- Years built: 1851-53-83 & c. 1952-55

Administration
- Province: Canterbury
- Diocese: Diocese of London
- Archdeaconry: Hackney
- Deanery: Hackney
- Parish: St Matthias Stoke Newington

Clergy
- Vicar: Fr David Lambert (July 2005)

St Matthias' Church is a Grade-I listed Church of England parish church in Stoke Newington, north London, England. Since it opened it has been known for its distinctly ‘High Church’ forms of worship.

== History ==
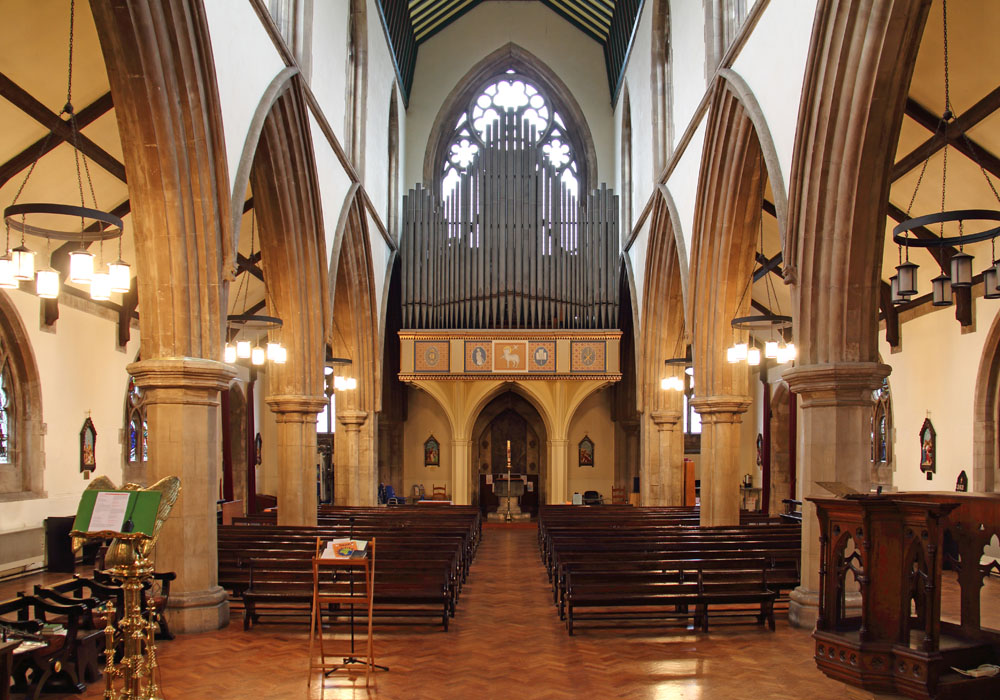
Looking west to the organ

The parish of St Matthias Stoke Newington was created in 1849, out of the parish of Stoke Newington and a parcel of 'detached' land belonging to Hornsey parish. The patron of the new parish - responsible for appointing the clergy - was alternately the Crown and the Bishop of London.

The impressive church building was designed by William Butterfield (1814–1900) and completed and consecrated in June 1853. The cost of the building was substantially met by a wealthy local surgeon named Robert Brett (1808–74). Brett was concerned at the flourishing of local Dissenting chapels such as the Newington Green Unitarian Church at the expense of the Established Church whose local buildings simply could not accommodate the area's rapidly growing population. Choral services at St Matthias' were developed by the organist, William Henry Monk, musical editor of Hymns Ancient and Modern and composer of "Abide with me".

Under the incumbency of Rev. Charles James Le Geyt, the ritualist, high church, tone of the services sparked off strong protests. In October 1867 the church was surrounded by a mob hundreds strong, protesting, and the vicar shouted at during the service. After the service the mob had grown and parishioners "roughly handled". It then tried to storm Brett's house, to be repelled by the police. After a subsequent anti-Ritualist demonstration in London Fields a large crowd processed towards St Matthias, one man dressed in a cardinal's cap, shouting "Attack the Church", "Down with St Matthias" and "Down with Le Geyt's house". A large police force with a reserve of 400 men were outside Le Geyt's house and the mob, again, dispersed having let out three large groans of protest at Le Geyt's High Church tendencies.

The building suffered from aerial bombing during the Second World War when all the interior surface decoration, stained glass and furniture was destroyed, as too the brick and stone vaulting of the chancel. The rebuilt church was reopened in 1954. The architect was Nugent Cachemaille-Day (1896–1976).

After the war the patronage of the living was transferred to the Corporation of London.

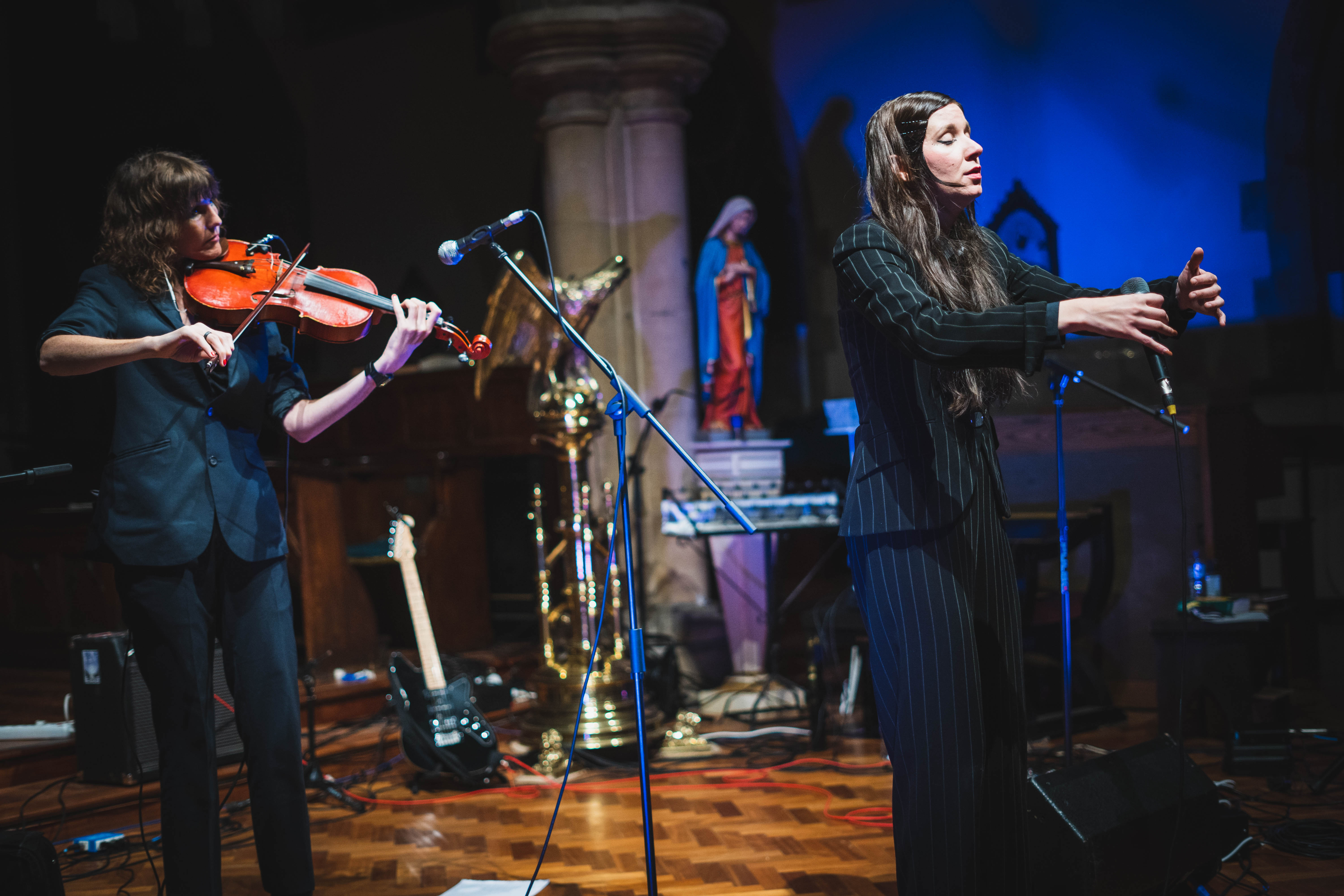
American musician Circuit Des Yeux performing inside the church in 2022

In 2022 it was hosting performances by musicians.

== Description of the current building ==
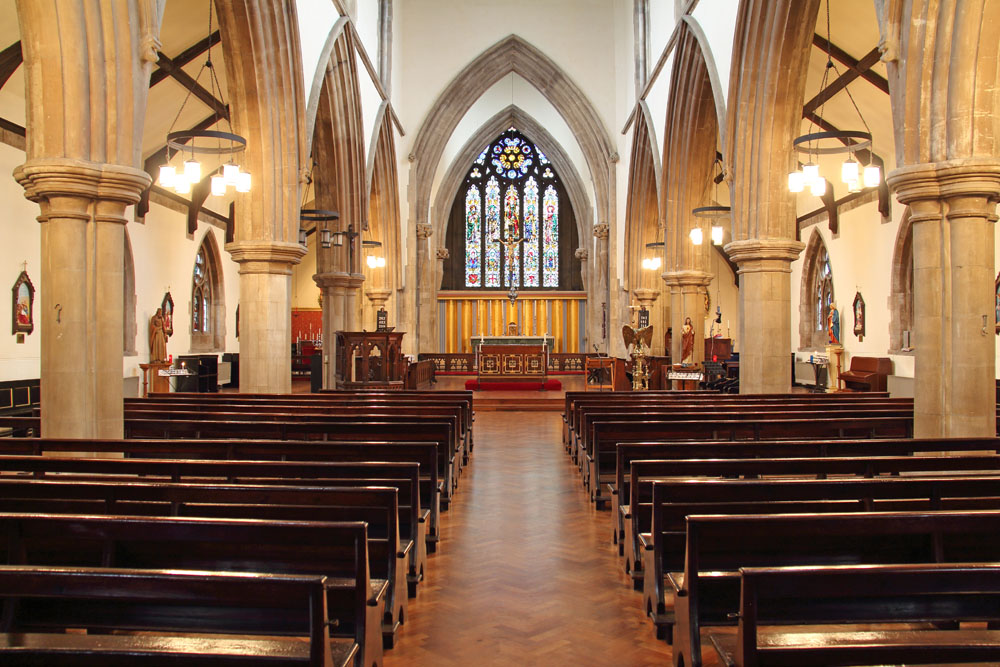
East end

The strongly individual building is of stock brick with Bath stone dressings and slate roofs. The tall nave of five bays has low, pent aisles and alternate octagonal and compound piers. The saddleback crossing tower with its very long bell openings is the most striking feature of the building creating inside a tall chancel arch with half-arches at east end of the aisles. The window tracery is a freely-adapted late Decorated type.

A programme of repairs was ongoing in 2019, funded by the parish with assistance from the Heritage Lottery Fund and Historic England.
