= St Mary's Church, Swanage =

Church in Dorset, England

Coordinates: 50.608691°N 1.9626957°W

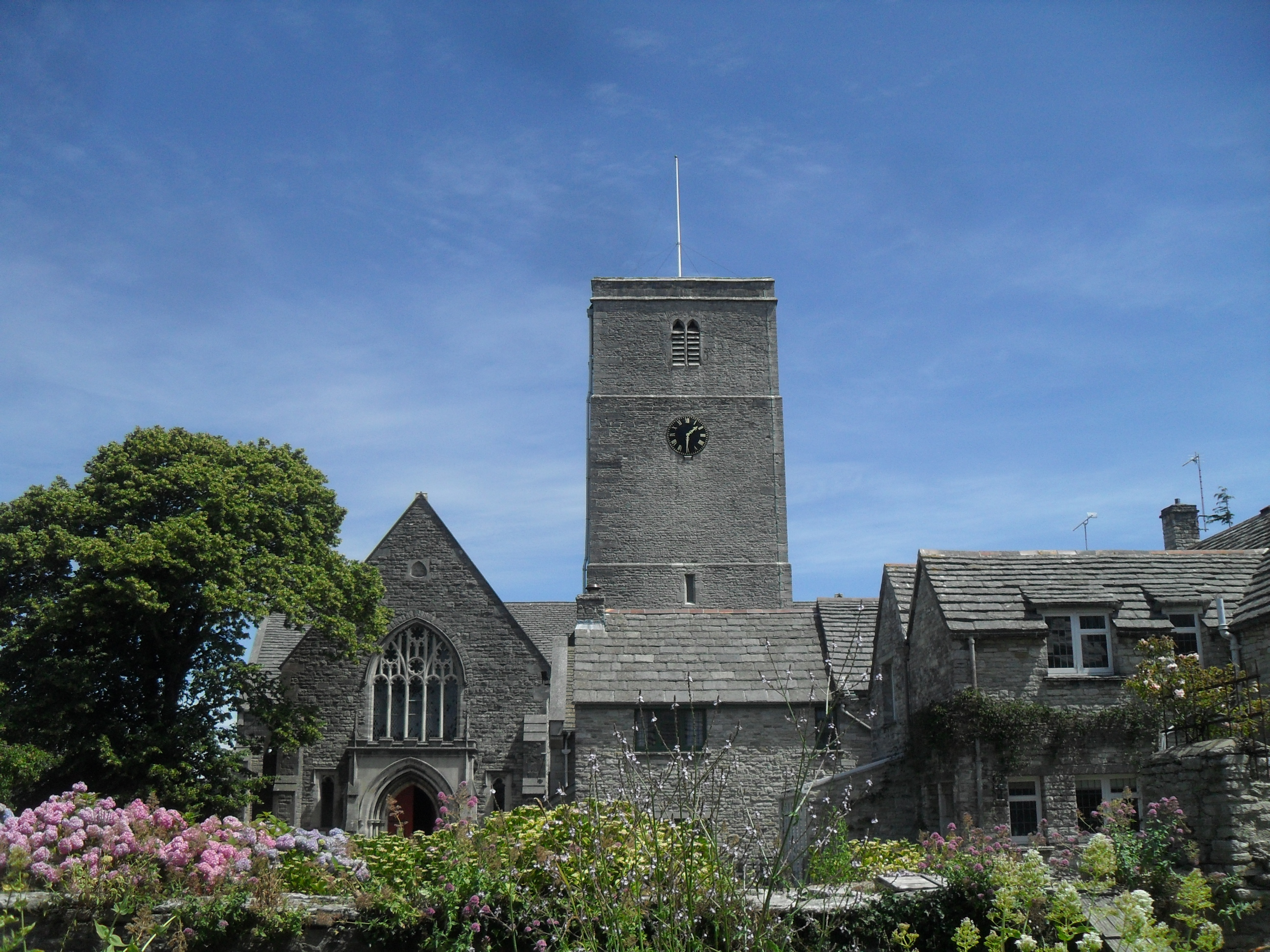
St Mary’s Church, Swanage, from the west

St Mary's Church is a parish church in Swanage, Dorset. It is dedicated to the Virgin Mary. The church is in the Archdeaconry of Dorset, in the Diocese of Salisbury. The tower is mediaeval; the church itself is a 19th and early 20th-century reconstruction. It is Grade II listed.

== History ==
St Mary's was originally a chapel of ease to St Nicholas's, Worth Matravers, and remained as such until 1487. Related to the chapel of ease origins, the Swanage local historian David Lewer speculated that the tower's origin was not ecclesiastical, and was more likely to be defensive. The church was the end-point of the Priest's Way, which was the route the priests took from Worth Matravers in order to say mass in Swanage.

The three lower stages of the square tower are 14th-century; the top stage dates from 1620. The tower is a plain structure, unbuttressed, with small plain windows and a parapet without battlements. The roof is lead covered. The tower carries a ring of eight bells. The two oldest are the work of John Wallis (dating from 1594 and 1612); the other six are the work of John Taylor & Co. Two of the John Taylor bells date from 1888; the other four date from 1940.

The mediaeval church was greatly altered in the 17th and 18th-centuries. A 17th-century Rector, the Rev Brune Cockram, demolished all of the church apart from the south transept, and rebuilt it. A recorded visit in 1847 described the church as consisting of a chancel, nave and belfry (i.e. the tower), but that there had previously been transepts as well. A war-time visit from the Royal Commission on the Historical Monuments of England assessed the surviving elements of the original church as being of 13th-century origin.

The church was rebuilt in a Gothic revival style by TH Wyatt in 1859–60, on land given for this purpose by Sir John Mowlem Burt.

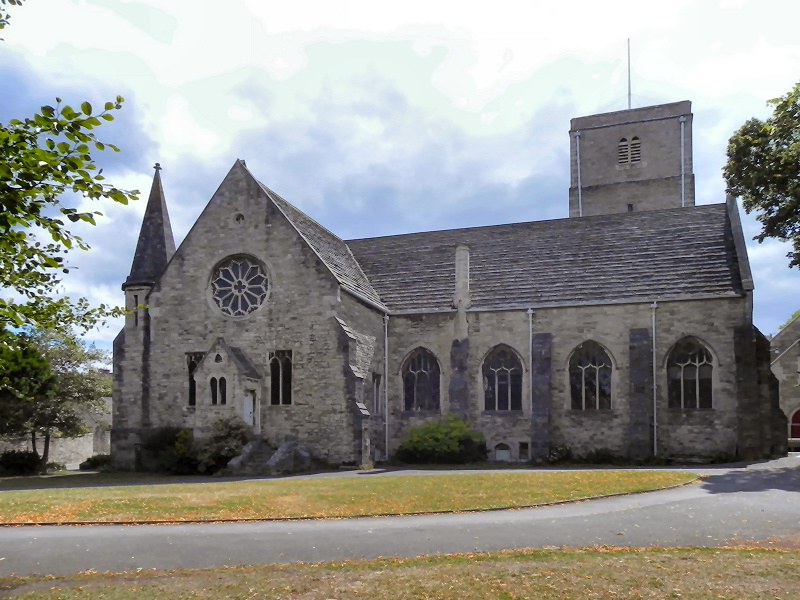
The north aisle and transept extension by Clifton & Robinson, 1906-08

Local architects James Edward Clifton and Edmund Arthur Robinson (a son of the art curator Sir John Charles Robinson) enlarged it in 1906–08 with the addition of a north aisle and galleried transepts. It is built of Purbeck stone. The main entrance is at the west end of the north aisle, and has a shallow portico with a doorway in an Early English style. Above that is a large window with Perpendicular tracery. An octagonal turret with stone spire adjoins the north transept. A number of 18th-century monuments were retained from the earlier church. The 19th-century font is Purbeck marble.

== Features ==
=== St Aldhelm's Chapel ===
The Swanage building contractor Sir George Burt was responsible for the construction of the daughter church of St Aldhelm's, on Park Road, which was opened in 1892. The church was never well-attended, and was closed and demolished in 1973. Some of the furnishings were then brought to St Mary's, and the north transept was converted into a chapel, dedicated to St Aldhelm (not to be confused with St. Aldhelm's Chapel, St. Aldhelm's Head). Daily morning prayer takes place in St Aldhelm's Chapel. The chancel screen includes stained glass depicting St Michael kneeling, the warrior to be crowned, and St George, by A. L. Moore, being the former east window of St Aldhelm's.

=== Stained glass ===
Most of the stained glass was lost to bomb damage during WWII.

The east window is by Francis Skeat of Goddard & Gibbs and depicts Christ in Majesty. The north chancel window depicts Christ calming the water and is a 19th-century survivor, possibly by Lavers & Westlake, and is a memorial to the Rev Robert Travers. The south aisle windows are a 19th-century depiction of an angel with a musical instrument in each light and a depiction of the Nativity by Skeat. The north aisle windows depict Elijah and the ravens by Abbot & Co given in memory of Charles Talbot-Dean and St John the Baptist by Leonard Pownall given in memory of the Rev William Wilson.

The windows in the south transept depict the Stoning of St Stephen, St George and the dragon, and St David, by Martin Travers given in memory of Hill Crest School pupils, and a rose window depicting the Royal British Legion badge by James Clarke & Eaton given in memory of lives lost in war. The north transept is now St Aldhelm's Chapel; one window is 19th-century and is a transfer from the former St Aldhelm's Church. The other three are by Abbott & Co, depicting St Aldhelm and Bishop Jewell, St Nicholas and HMS Glorious, and St Luke. At an upper level in the north transept is a rose window by Henry Haig depicting the Creation.

=== Organ ===
An organ was first installed in the former parish church in 1829, but nothing further of this instrument is known, other than that it was located in the gallery, and that, when it was replaced, it was sold to the Swanage Congregational Church (now the United Reformed Church) for £18. It was re-installed in the Congregational Church in 1876 by FJ Duncan of Poole.

The next instrument was built by W.G. Vowles in 1875. In turn, that too was sold to the Congregational Church, in 1900 for £60. (This organ was replaced in the Congregational Church in 1934 by a new organ built by George Osmond of Taunton; the Osmond organ was destroyed by bomb damage in 1943.)

The third organ was another instrument by Vowles. It was a two-manual instrument, located on the north side of the chancel, facing across the choir, and with five pipes of the Great Open Diapason facing the nave. When the church was extended with the addition of a north aisle in 1906, the 1899 Vowles organ was rebuilt, enlarged to a three-manual and relocated to the east end of the north aisle, again by Vowles.

It was considerably modified in 1958 and 1965 by Harrison & Harrison. It was rebuilt in 1986-87 by Kenneth James & Son. The organ was rebuilt again in 2017 by the Isle of Wight organ-builders, Andrew Cooper & Co.

The director of music is (2021) Simon Lole.

== Churchyard ==
The original churchyard was small, and on the western and southern sides of the church. An additional, detached churchyard, on the southern side of Church Hill, was acquired in 1826. The wall and tombstones of the detached churchyard are also Grade II listed.

== Incumbents ==
=== Rectors of Worth ===
- 1297-1308 Henry Terry
- 1308-1325 Alexander Wenden
- 1325-1361 Walter de Swanewich
- 1361-1378 Richard Swayne
- 1378-1408 Robert Starcliffe
- 1408-1414 William Talbot
- 1414-1419 Robert Osanne
- 1419-1436 Richard Abbot
- 1436-1457 Thomas Umfray
- 1457-1473 John Homme
- 1473-1486 Edmund Martyn
- 1486-1487 John Elyot

=== Rectors of Swanage ===
- 1487-1504 John Phelippes
- 1504-1506 John Savage
- 1506-1521 William Hyndebere
- 1521-1537 Edward Higgons
- 1537-1570 Thomas Griffith
- 1570 Thomas Whalley
- 1570-1576 Thomas Cooke
- 1576-1586 John Whitcomb
- 1586-1614 Edward Abbot
- 1614-1667 Brune Cockram
- 1667-1690 William Rose
- 1690-1714 Philip Baker
- 1714-1749 Edmund Cooke
- 1749-1782 John Pyke
- 1782-1785 John Thompson
- 1785-1801 Richard Williams
- 1801-1809 Andrew Bell. Bell was an educationalist who pioneered the Monitorial System of education.
- 1810-1816 Samuel Gale
- 1817-1841 Thomas Oldfield Bartlett
- 1841-1854 James Leonard Jackson
- 1854-1887 Robert Duncan Travers. Travers was the son of Rear-Admiral Sir Eaton Stannard Travers.
- 1887-1901 Thomas Alfred Gurney. Gurney was a grandson of the shorthand writer William Brodie Gurney.
- 1901-1905 William Arthur Wilson
- 1905-1908 William Henry Parsons
- 1908-1916 Henry Edwyn Eardley. Eardley had previously been a curate at Swanage, and married the daughter of the then Rector, the Rev Robert Duncan Travers.
- 1916-1934 William Riddell Parr
- 1934-1950 Hubert Victor Nicoll-Griffith
- 1951-1961 Norman Miller
- 1961-1969 Hector David Anderson. Anderson was a Chaplain to the Queen, 1955–76.
- 1969-1983 David Bailey
- 1983-1993 David Kingsley Callard
- 1993-2001 Dudley John Ratcliffe
- 2002-2016 John Samuel Wood
- Since 2017 John Owen Mann. Mann had previously been Dean of St Anne’s Cathedral, Belfast (2011-17).
