= LLF =

LLF may refer to:

- IATA code for Yongzhou Lingling Airport
- Landmark Legal Foundation
- Limited Locking Facility
- Line Loss Factor
- Lahore Literary Festival, an international literature festival held annually in Lahore, Pakistan
- Lucknow Literary Festival, an international literature festival held annually in Lucknow, Uttar Pradesh, India
- Llanfairfechan railway station, Wales; National Rail station code LLF.
- Load-loss factor
- Lobster Liberation Front
- Low-level formatting of computer hard disks.
- Low Level Flight, a Canadian alternative rock band
- LoveLikeFire, a San Francisco indie rock band
