= Priest's Way =

Ancient trackway in Dorset

Coordinates: 50°36′N 2°1′W

The Priest's Way
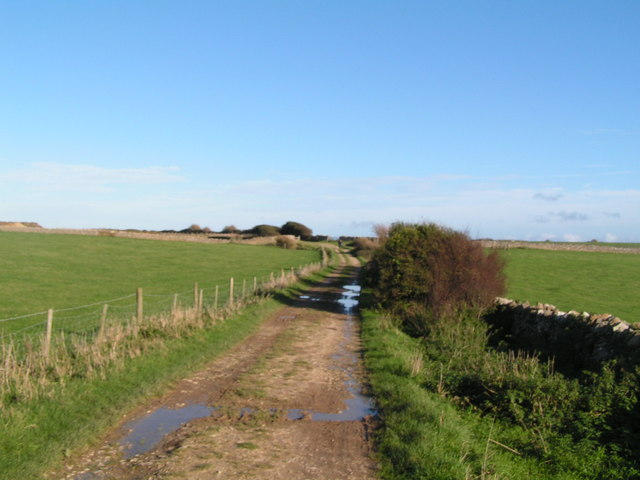
- The Priest's Way near Worth Matravers, Dorset
- Length: 4.8 km (3.0 mi)
- Location: South West England, United Kingdom
- Trailheads: Worth Matravers, Dorset; St Mary's Church, Swanage, Dorset
- Use: Hiking, cycling and byway; former priest's way
- Season: All year

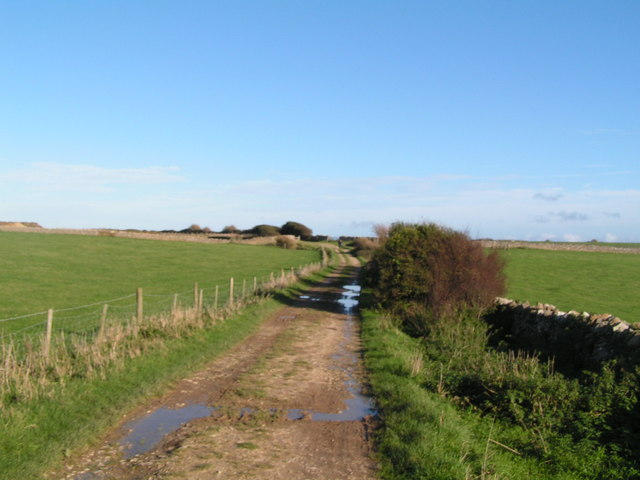
The Priest's Way at Worth Matravers

The Priest's Way is the historical route taken by clergy from St Nicholas's, Worth Matravers to St Mary's Church, Swanage in the Isle of Purbeck in Dorset. The track arose as a result of St Mary's being a chapel of ease to St Nicholas's, and followed the route priests took to say mass in Swanage. A modern footpath and bridleway follows much of the route.

== Historic Priest's Way ==
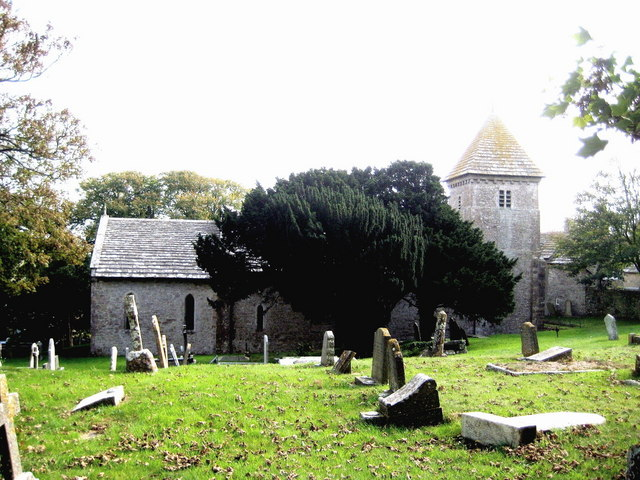
St Nicholas's, Worth Matravers

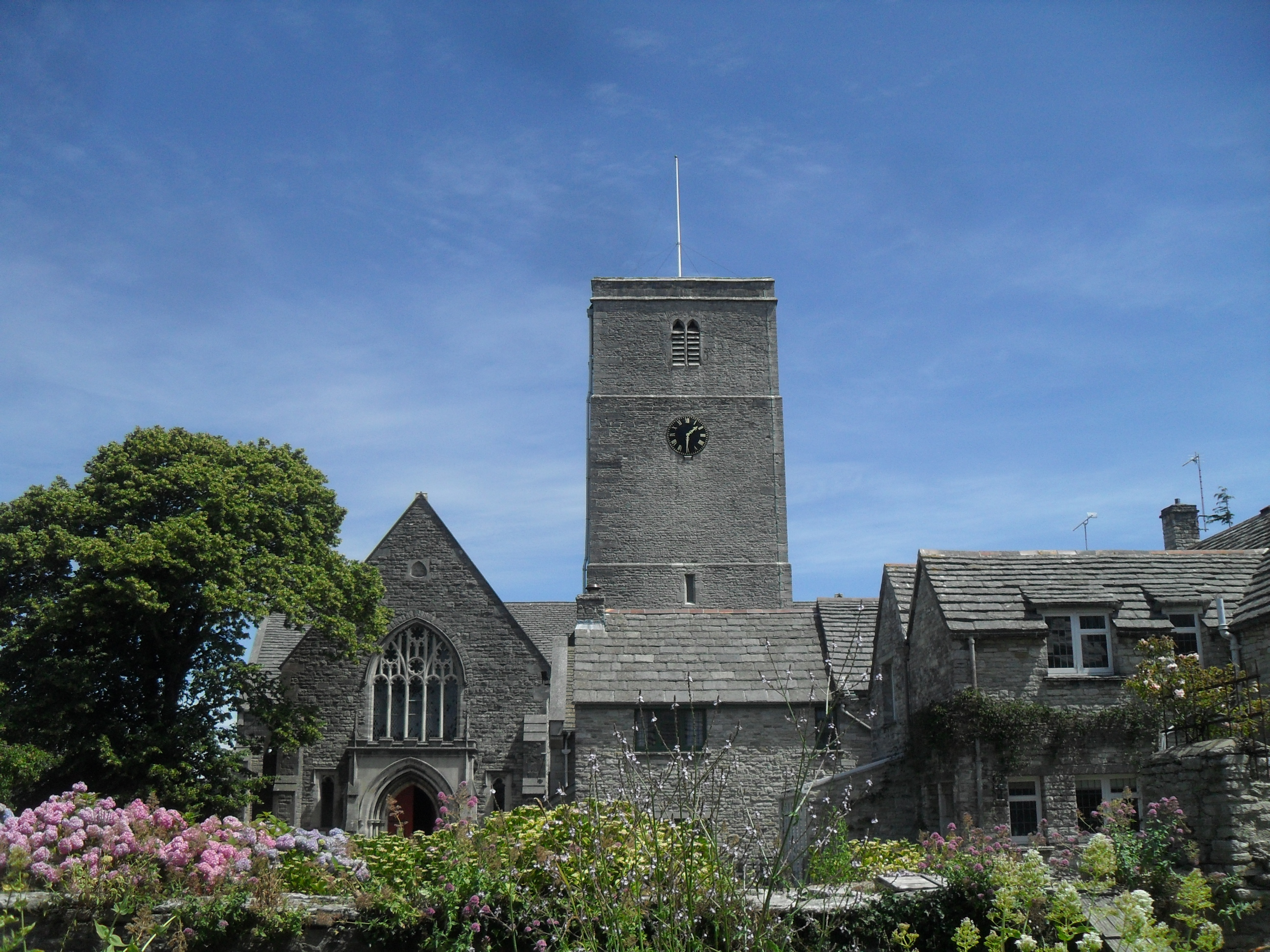
St Mary's Church, Swanage

St Mary's Church, Swanage was a chapel of ease to St Nicholas's, Worth Matravers until 1487; at that point the position was then reversed. Names of Rectors of Worth, and then of Swanage, are known from 1297. The Priest's Way is the track that the priest followed from Worth Matravers to Swanage and back in order to serve both churches.

== Modern Priest's Way ==
The modern Priest's Way is a public footpath and bridleway, and is maintained by Dorset Council. Its length is 3 miles, running from just north-east of Worth Matravers to the outskirts of Swanage. It forms part of the South West Coast Path. It underwent restoration work in 2014.

== Features ==
Features on the route of the Priest's Way, from Worth Matravers to Swanage, include:

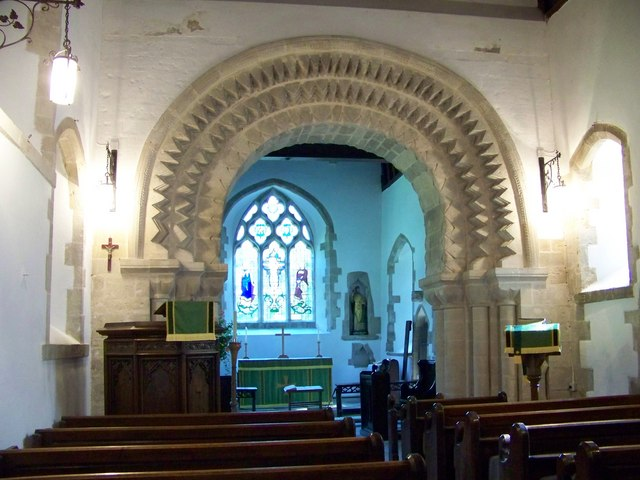
The Romanesque chancel arch at St Nicholas's, Worth Matravers

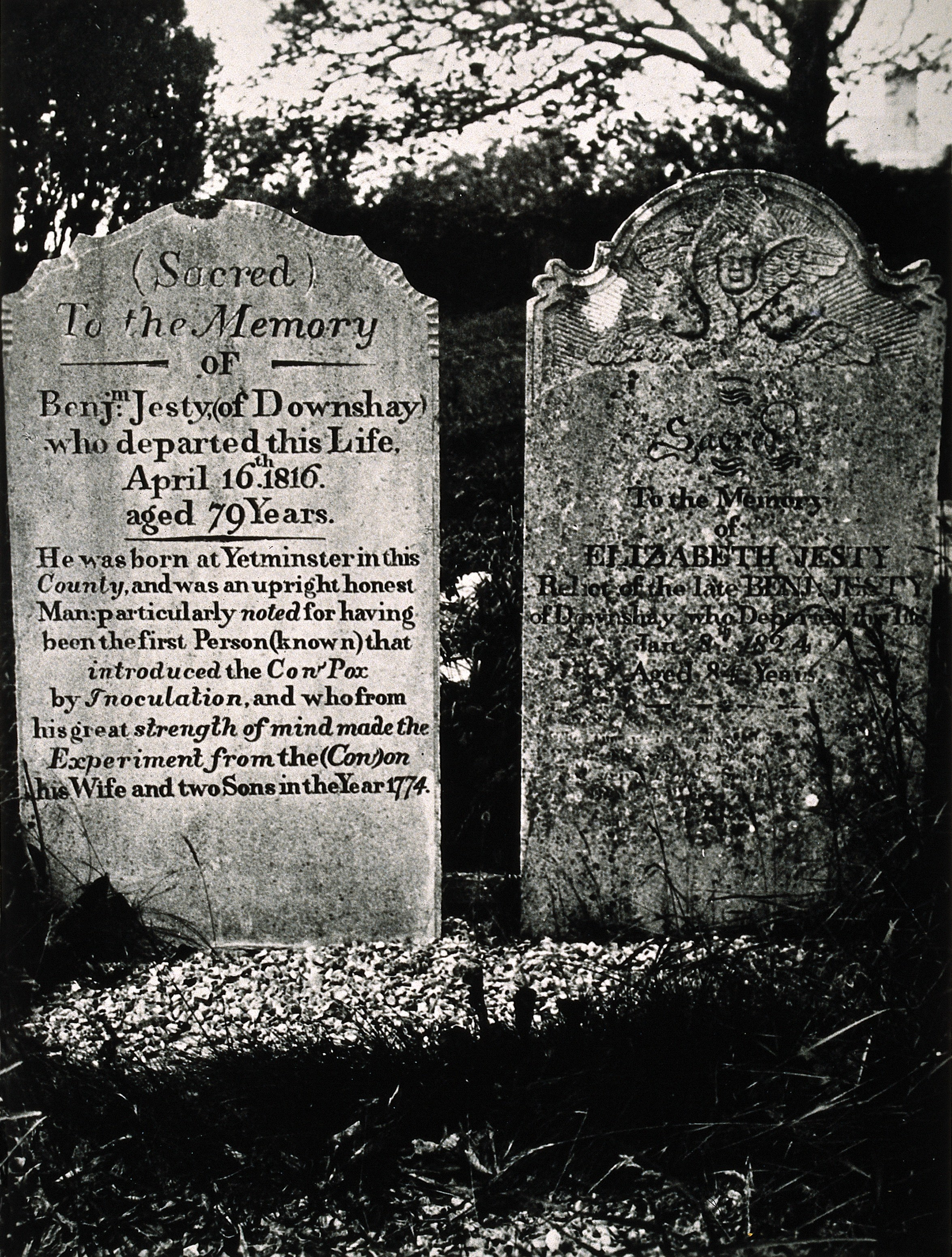
Benjamin Jesty's gravestone at St Nicholas’s, Worth Matravers

- St Nicholas of Myra Church, Worth Matravers, a Grade I listed 12th-century church notable for its Romanesque chancel arch. The churchyard includes the grave of the early proponent of vaccination against smallpox, Benjamin Jesty, which is separately Grade II listed for his historic significance.

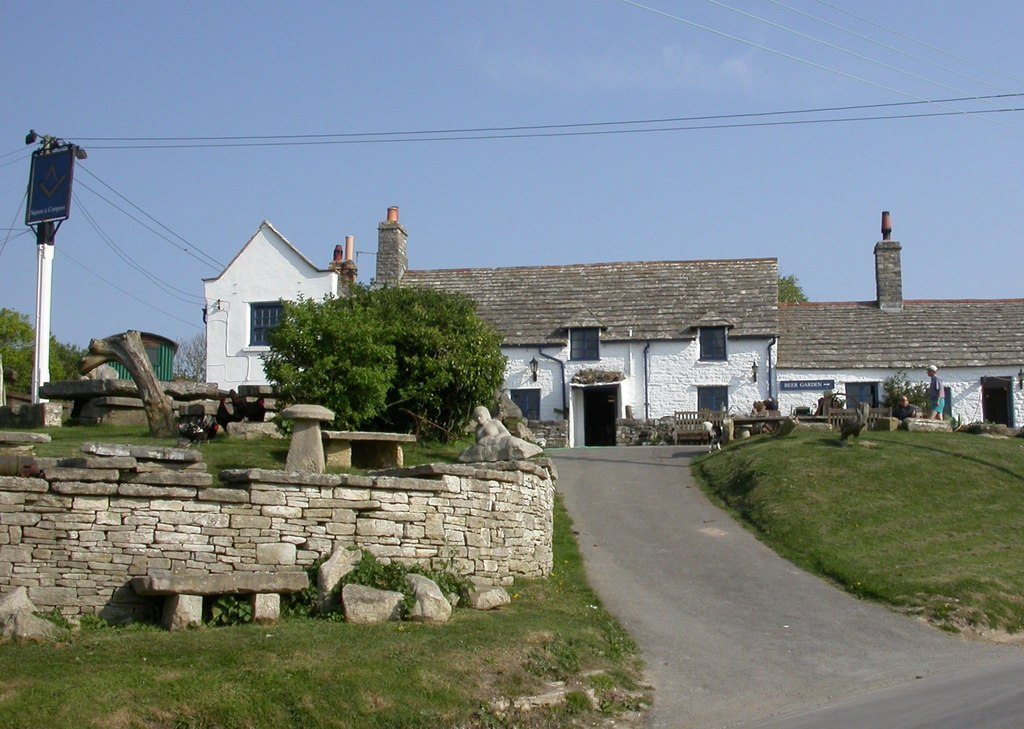
The Square & Compass at Worth Matravers

- Square & Compass public house, trading as an inn since at least 1793 and possibly as early as 1752, and has its own museum housing fossils, dinosaur bones and archaeological finds. It is Grade II listed, partly for the retained historic absence of a counter, beer being served instead through two serving hatches. A recent feature (erected in 2015) at the pub is Woodhenge, a henge monument constructed from wood and modelled on Stonehenge.
- Keates Quarry dinosaur footprints. Discovered in 1997 and opened to the public in 2016, these 140 million year old footprints were left by sauropod dinosaurs.
- A small pond, home to a population of great-crested newts.
- Spyway Barn, a Grade II listed early 19th-century barn, which was acquired by the National Trust in the 1990s and is used as a display room. The name Spyway refers to the smuggling activities that used to take place at this location, and Spyway Barn was used to store smuggled goods. The National Trust also own an adjacent cottage, Spyway Cottage, which is available for holiday rentals.
- A restored lime kiln.
- The Priest's Way then follows the route of two streets, Priests Way and Priests Road (both named after the Priest’s Way).
- St Mary's Church, Swanage, a 19th and early-20th century reconstruction of the mediaeval chapel of ease (by then the parish church); the tower is the only remaining mediaeval part of the church.

Other features that are near the Priest's Way, but not immediately on it, include the Burngate Stone Carving Centre in Langton Matravers, Langton Matravers Museum, St George's Church in Langton Matravers, the Dancing Ledge, and Herston Halt on the Swanage Railway.
