= St Richard's Church, Ham =

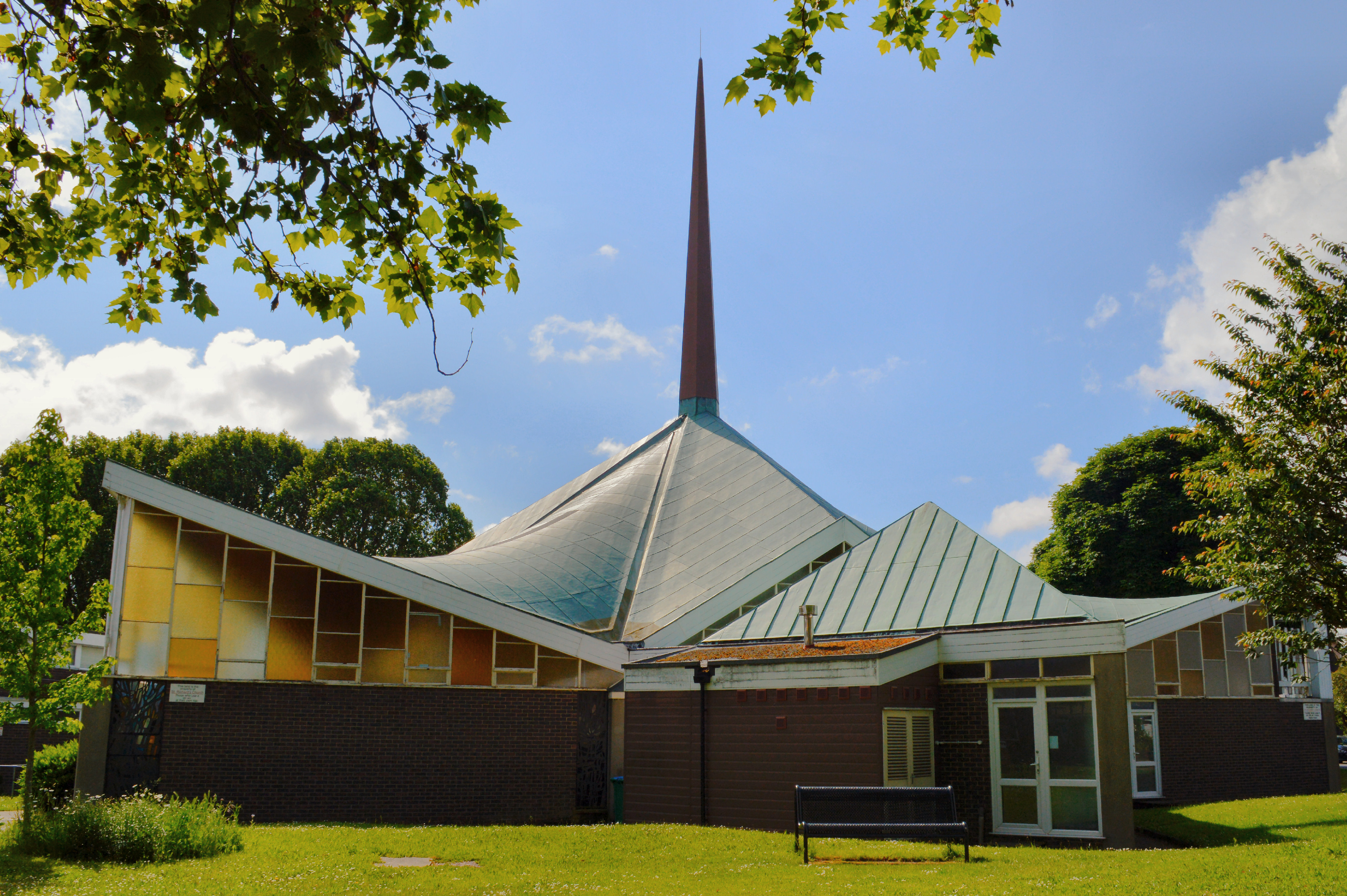
- St Richard's Church, Ham
- 51°26′11″N 0°19′11″W
- Location: Ashburnham Road, Ham, Richmond TW10 7LN
- Country: England
- Denomination: Church of England
- Website: www.achurchnearyou.com/church/650/

History
- Status: Church
- Founded: 19 August 1964
- Consecrated: 20 May 1966

Architecture
- Functional status: Active
- Architect: Ralph Covell

Administration
- Diocese: Southwark

Clergy
- Vicar: Revd Dr Simon Coupland since 2018

Listed Building – Grade II
- Official name: Church of St Richard, Ham
- Designated: 9 February 2024
- Reference no.: 1488007

St Richard's Church, Ham is an Anglican church on Ashburnham Road, Ham in the London Borough of Richmond upon Thames. It was founded in 1964 and is dedicated to St Richard of Chichester.

== History ==
The church was built as part of a substantial housing development on land given by the construction company Wates. The foundation stone was laid on 19 September 1964 by Norman Wates. During the construction, Wates provided access to a workmen's hut for the new and rapidly growing congregation to worship in.

Architect Ralph Covell based the design on the six-pointed Star of David creating an hexagonal space for worship to bring congregation and clergy closer together, as encouraged by the Second Vatican Council. The six sections of the star-shaped roof comprise alternate hyperbolic paraboloid (hypar) shells and pyramidal structures.

The triangular points of the star form, clockwise from the east, the entrance, lady chapel, parish room (Nash Room), vestry, kitchen and children's area. Henry Haig, then teaching at Kingston School of Art, was commissioned to create the fourteen stained glass windows. Haig also painted the sacristy doors and made the original processional cross. The non-figurative designs of the windows and paintings are inspired by aspects of the life and work of St Richard.

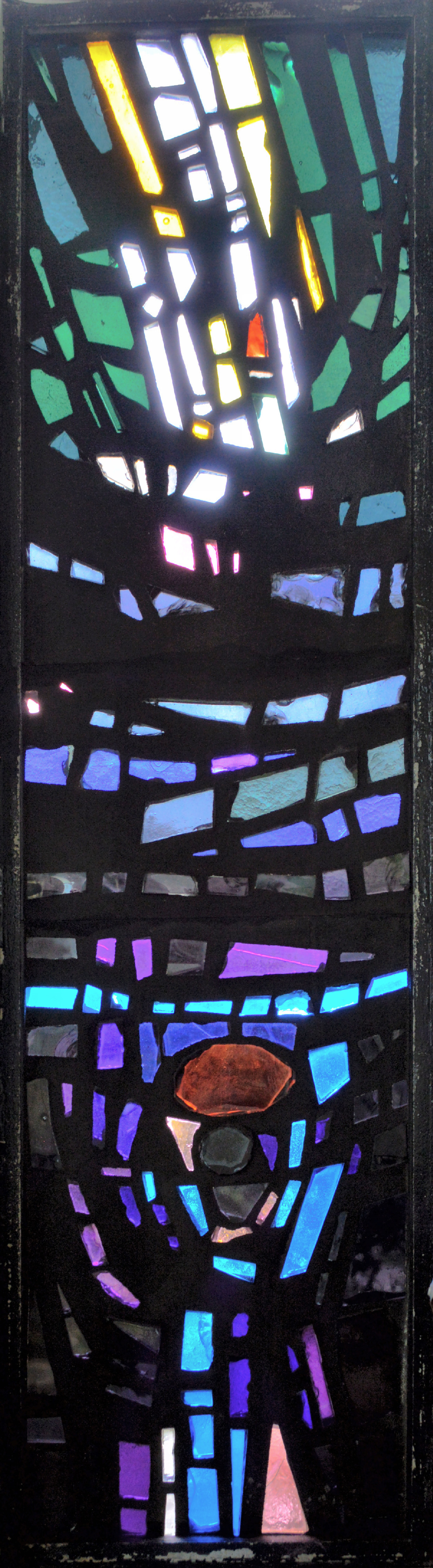
Death of St Richard window

The pair of window panels behind the altar of the lady chapel depict the chalice of St Richard. Running clockwise from there the next window depicts the miracle of the fishes. The following pair represent St Richard's gentleness and humour. The ruling bishop's mitre features in the next panel. The next three panels, to the right of the altar, are a group that show St Richard's power and strength in the outer panels with the central one representing the initial suppression of Richard's power by Henry III. The following panel represents St Richard's miracle at Candlemas and the next two represent St Richard the gardener and the growth of plants. The next depicts birth whilst the pair flanking the entrance represent St Richard's death with one showing hands pressing down on the chalice and releasing the soul whilst the other shows gifts left at the tomb.

The tracker organ with electric blower, single manual keyboard, small pedal keyboard and nine stops, originally made in about 1900 by Bevington and Sons of London, was rebuilt in the church in 1965 by N. P. Mander Ltd.

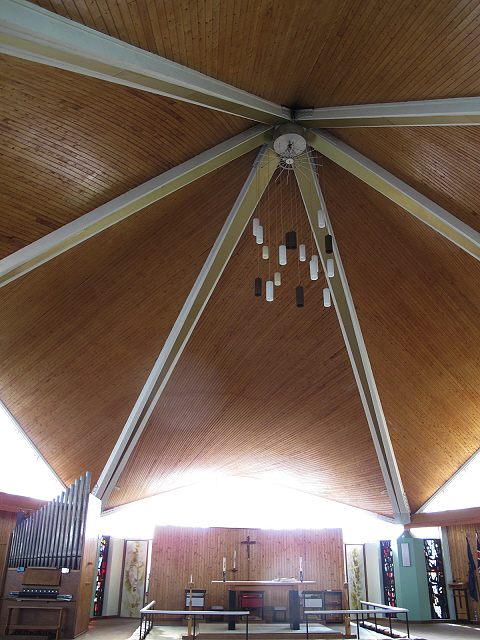
The church's interior, showing the wood-lined ceiling, suspended lights, organ to the left, altar centre with Henry Haig's processional cross behind, flanked by some of his stained glass windows and paintings on the vestry doors

On 20 May 1966 the church was consecrated to St Richard of Chichester by the Right Reverend Mervyn Stockwood, then Bishop of Southwark.

The kitchen and facilities for disabled people were improved in 1998. The children's area was developed in 2003 with the addition of folding screens and a mural. A large wooden cross that stands on the mound outside the church was constructed by local young people in 2006.

The church was listed Grade II in February 2024. It was later added to the Heritage at Risk Register and forced to close due to issues with the roof. In March 2026 Historic England confirmed a grant of £425,000 for repairs.

== Church activities ==
A weekly Parish Communion is held at 10 am on Sunday and is followed by tea and coffee. A Said Communion is held on Tuesday at 10 am.

== Community use ==
The church is linked to the adjacent St Richard's CE Primary School which uses the church for assemblies and other activities. The church space is also used by various community groups as well as those connected with the church. Users include a play group, a choir and a martial arts group.
