= St Alban's Head =

Headland in Dorset

Coordinates: 50.5788°N 2.0565°W

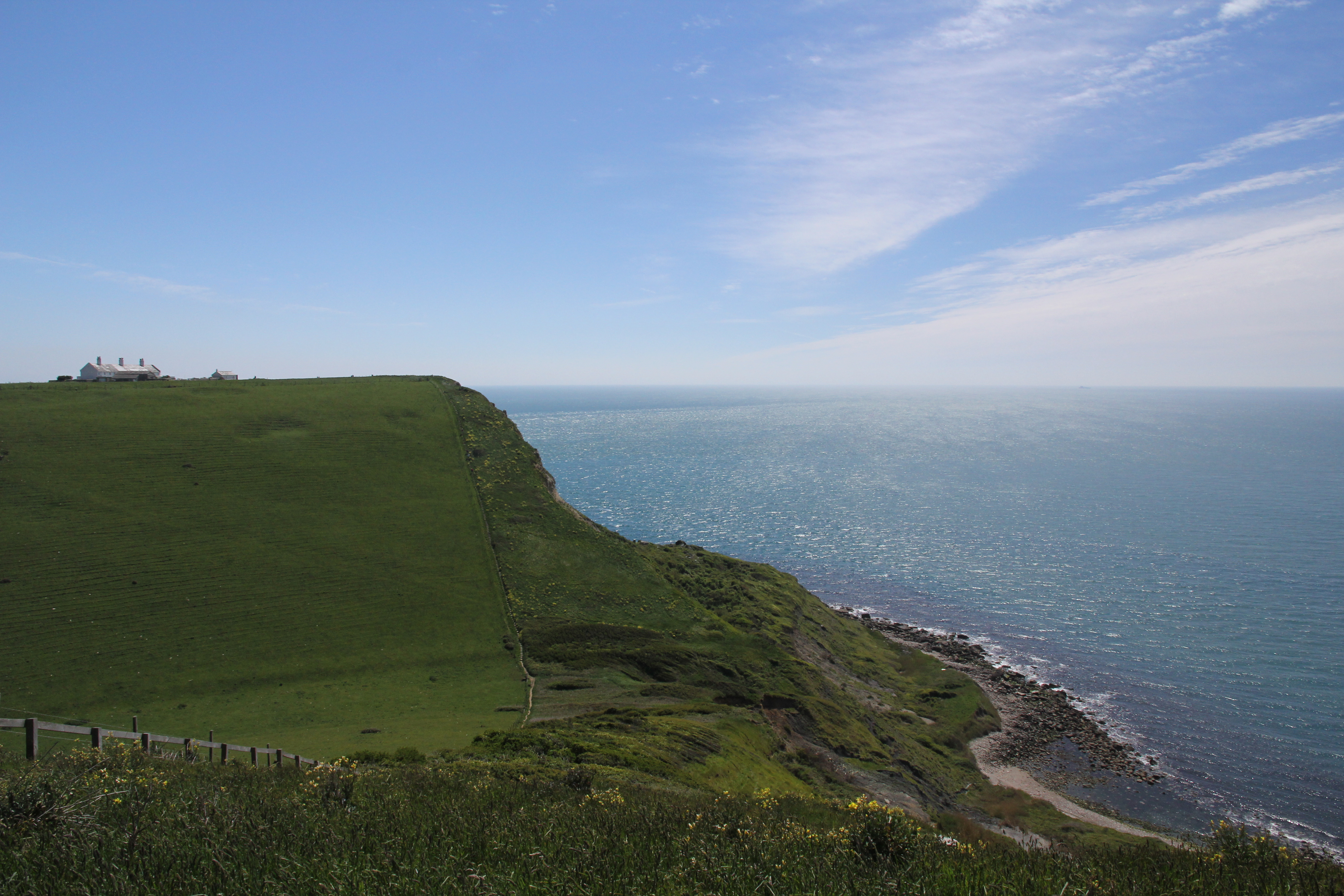
St Alban's Head, Dorset, seen from the SW Coast Path to the north.

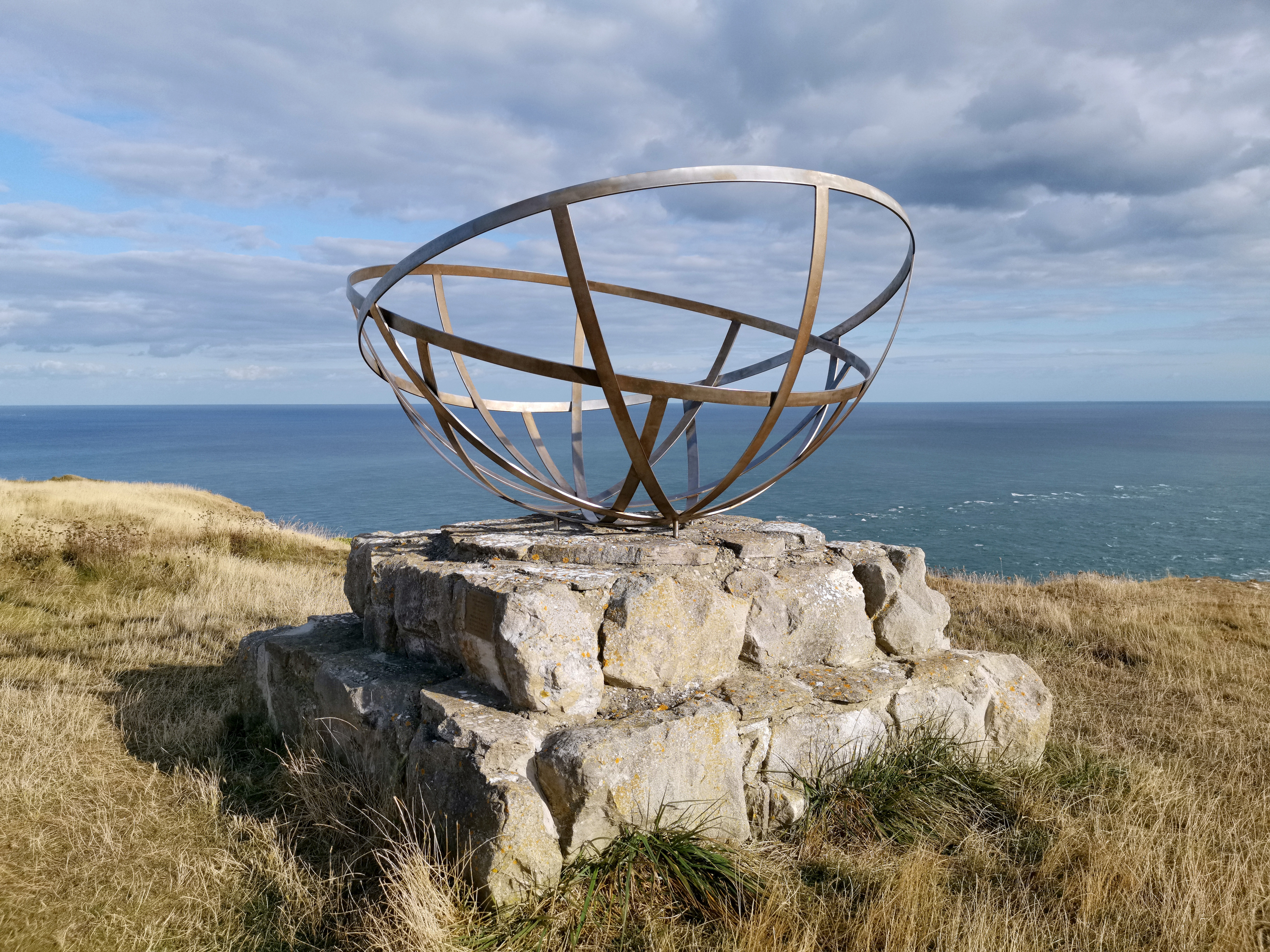
Radar Research Memorial

St Alban's Head (corruption of St Aldhelms Head) is a headland located 5 kilometres (3.1 mi) southwest of Swanage, on the coast of Dorset, England. It is the most southerly part of the Purbeck peninsula, and comprises an outcrop of Portland Stone from the overlying Lower Purbeck Stone. It is part of the Jurassic Coast, a World Heritage Site. It is designated a Special Area of Conservation under the European Union's Habitats Directive.

The Norman St. Aldhelm's Chapel, dedicated to St Aldhelm, Bishop of Sherborne stands on the head. On the bluff of the headland is a monument to the development of radar during World War II, by the Telecommunications Research Establishment at nearby RAF Worth Matravers. There is also a coastguard station, now maintained by the National Coastwatch Institution and some former coastguard cottages.

The western side of St Alban's Head contains a Royal Marines Memorial. The memorial is set with a small memorial garden which overlooks Chapman's Pool.

St Alban's Head has been heavily quarried and there is a defunct sea-cliff quarry underneath the coastguard station. St Aldhelms Quarry just inland is still in active use.

LB&SCR H2 class 4-4-2 no. 426 (later no. B426, 2426, and 32426) was named St. Alban's Head after this landmark.
