= Spyway =

National Trust property in Dorset

Coordinates: 50.602217°N 2.0201701°W

Spyway is an isolated property in the parish of Worth Matravers in Dorset and is owned by the National Trust. It is located on the route of the Priest's Way. It is notable for having 140 million-year old dinosaur footprints.

== Dinosaur footprints ==
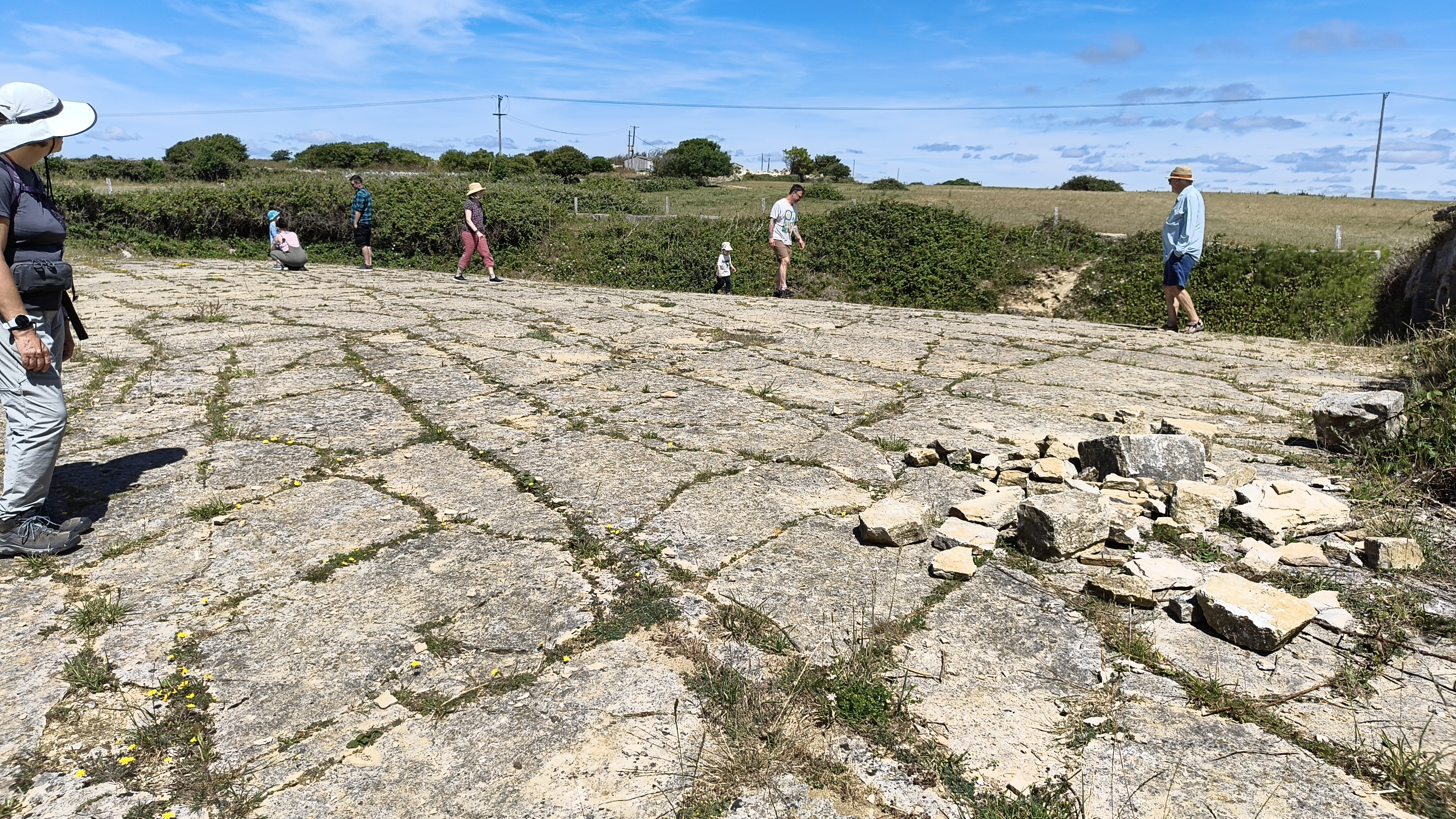
Spyway Dinosaur Footprints

The footprints were made by sauropods 140 million years ago. The fossils were found in the Purbeck Limestone Group, dated to the earliest Cretaceous period. At that time, the site was a beach along a coastal lagoon.

The footprints were discovered by quarrymen Kevin Keates and Trev Haysom in 1997. The over-100 prints were investigated by paleontologist Joanna Wright. The National Trust opened Spyway to the public in 2016.

== Other features ==
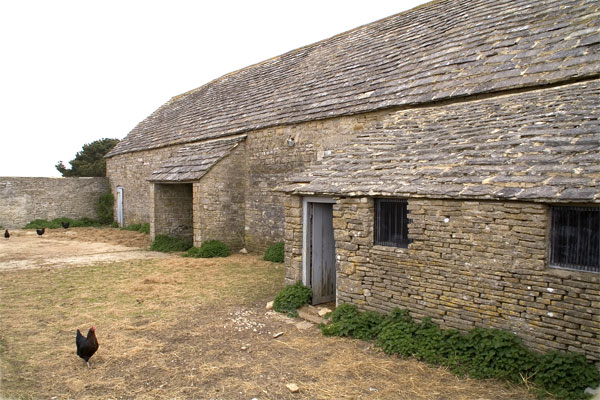
Spyway Barn

Spyway Barn, a Grade II listed early 19th-century barn, which was acquired by the National Trust in the 1990s, is used as a display room. The name Spyway refers to the smuggling activities that used to take place at this location, and Spyway Barn was used to store smuggled goods. The National Trust also own an adjacent cottage, Spyway Cottage, which is available for holiday rentals.
