= Henry Haig =

English abstract artist

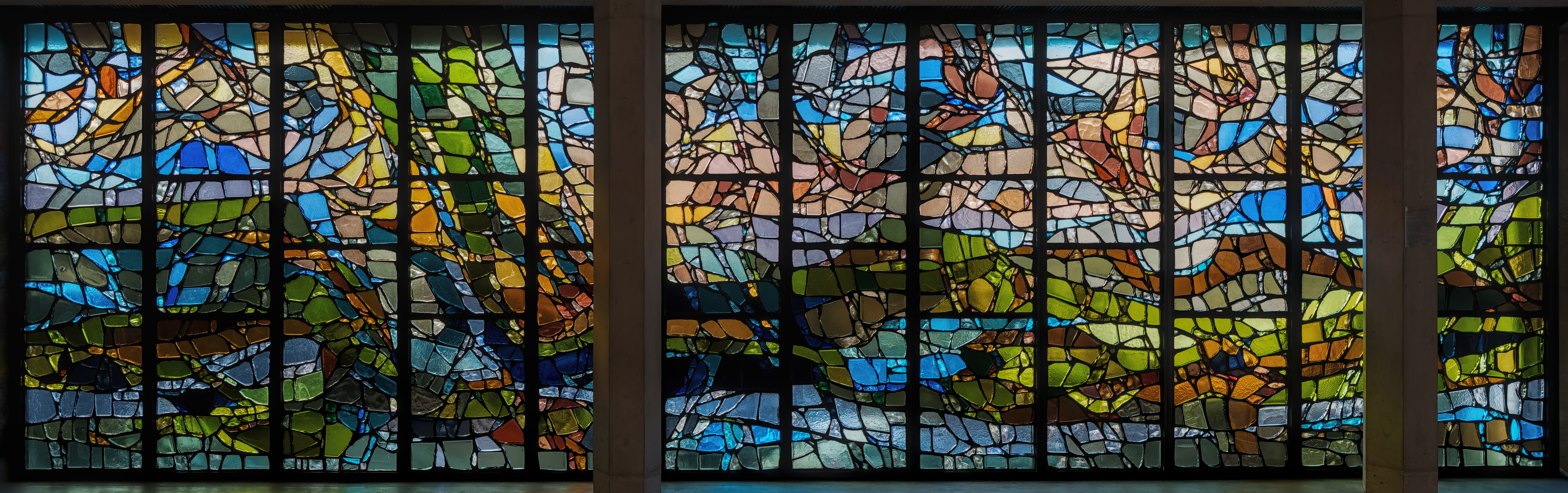
- "Jubilation" (1972–73), Clifton Cathedral
- Born: 9 February 1930; Hampstead, London, UK
- Died: 6 December 2007 (aged 77); Yeovil, UK
- Education: Wimbledon School of Art, Royal Academy of Art
- Known for: stained glass; painting; sculpture
- Movement: non-figurative modern art
- Spouse: Joan Salmon

Henry Haig (9 February 1930 – 6 December 2007) was an English abstract artist, painter and sculptor but notable predominantly for his stained glass work.

== Early life and education ==
Born in Hampstead in 1930, Haig's talent was recognised and encouraged by Jack Fairhurst, his art teacher at Richmond and East Sheen County School for Boys. A visit to Wimbledon School of Art at the age of fifteen led to an immediate offer of a place. Haig studied painting and sculpture there for five years until called for national service in 1949. He refused an officer's commission on completion, preferring to return to his art studies. He applied for a place in the painting school of the Royal College of Art but accepted an invitation to the stained glass department, led by Lawrence Lee. Haig was at RCA between 1952 and 1955, and, having met fellow student Joan Salmon during this time, they were married on New Year's Day, 1956. The couple went on to have five children.

== Career and works ==
One of Haig's earliest public works is the concrete, glass and granite chip frieze in the booking hall of South Ruislip station. It is thought by some to date from the 1948 construction of the station; others date it at 1961.

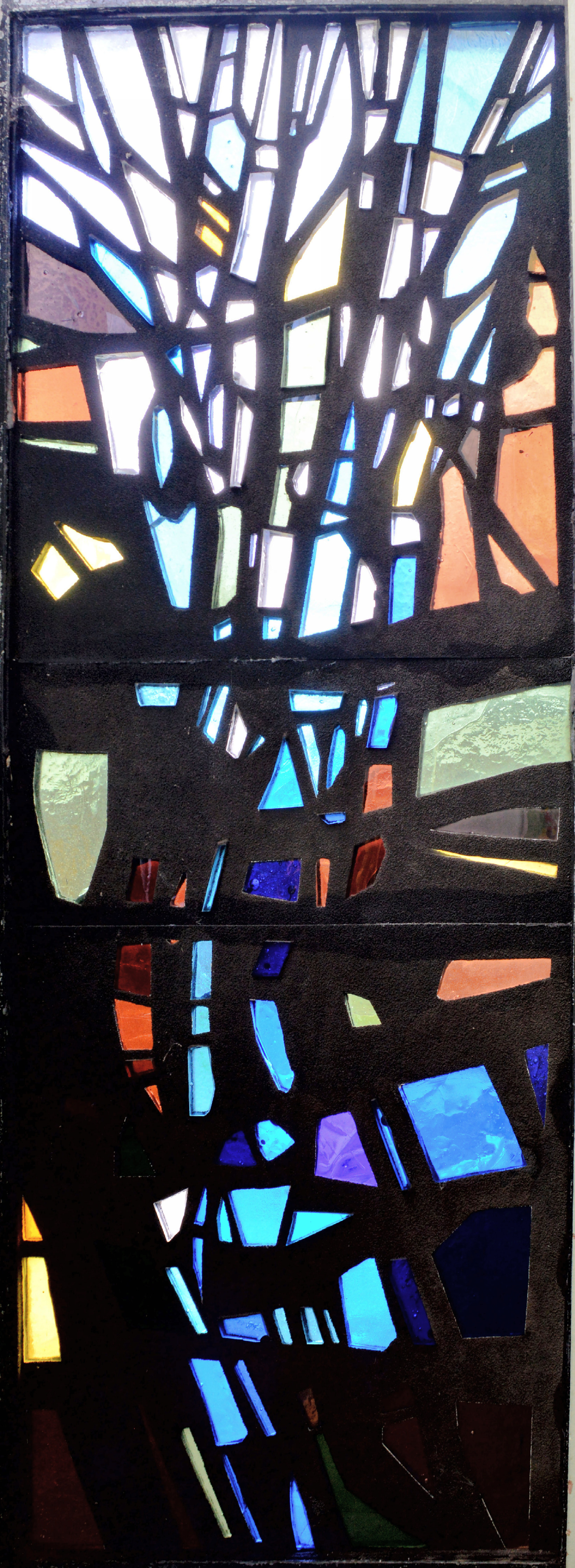
St Richard's Church, Ham, London

Both Joan and Henry went into teaching. Henry taught at Kingston College of Art and, whilst there, received a commission for St Richard's Church in Ham, London, under construction in 1964–1965. Henry created fourteen dalle de verre windows inspired by the life of St Richard. He also painted the sacristy door panels which are faced with enamels, gold and silver fused onto sheet steel, the left door depicting the Bishop's chalice and the right evoking the "shimmer at the entrance to Paradise". The sculpted wood, copper and gilt processional cross and candlesticks are also Haig's work.

Haig's commissions gradually allowed him to give up teaching and concentrate full-time on his art, based in his home studio, a converted racquets court, in Fifehead Magdalen, Dorset where the family lived from 1969.

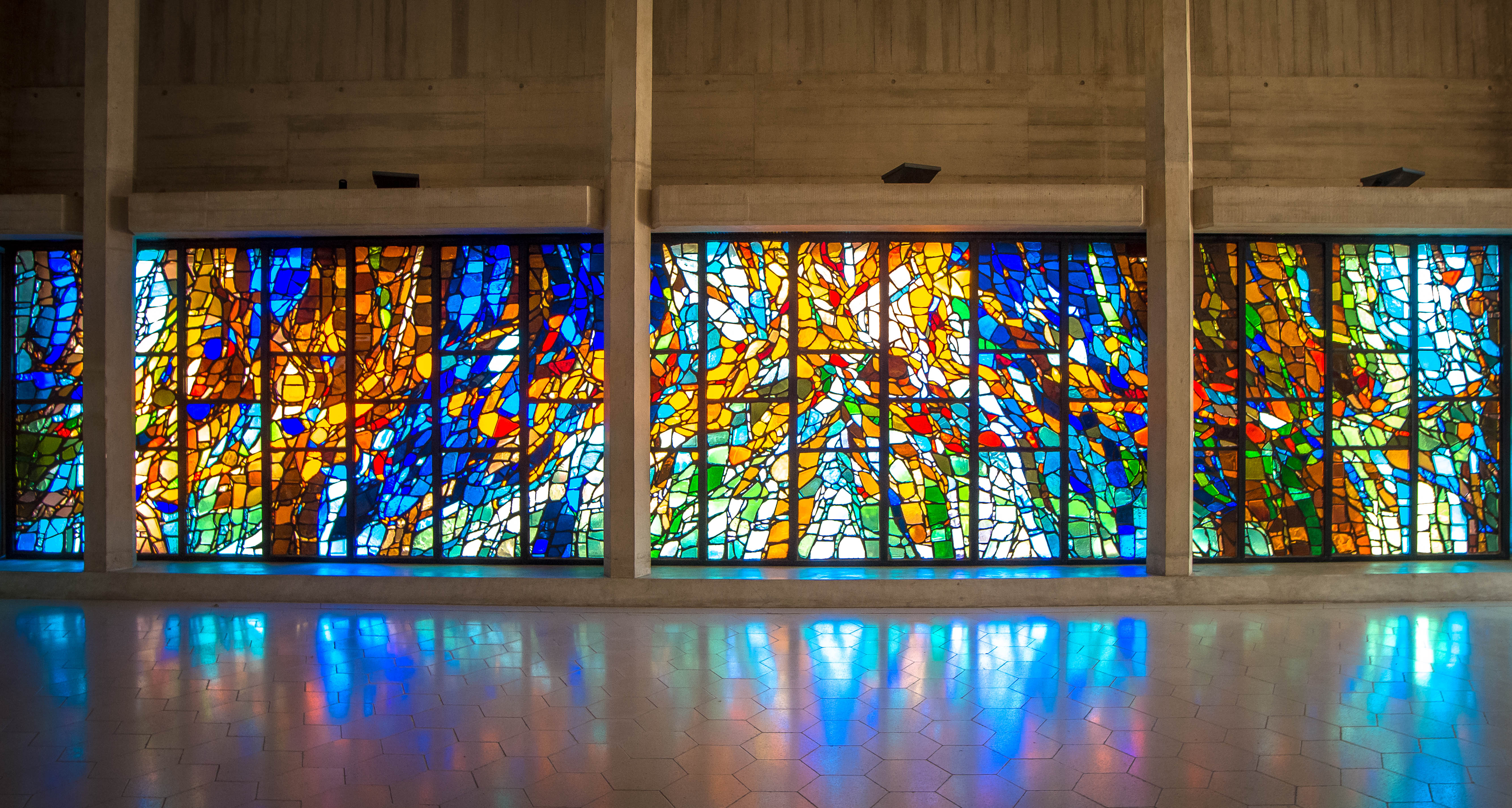
"Pentecost", (1972–73), Clifton Cathedral

Haig received a commission for Clifton Cathedral, Bristol, the project dating from 1965 and completed in 1972–73. Like St Richard's, Clifton has a six-pointed star plan with a hexagonal interior space. Haig's window contains 8,000 pieces of glass set in epoxy resin. The larger of the narthex windows depicts "Pentecost" and the smaller one "Jubilation".

Two windows symbolic of previous churches were made for Christ Church (Methodist/URC) Chichester and installed in 1982. Family associations were the theme for 1984 windows in the church of St. Mary, Donhead St Mary, Wiltshire. In 1985, Haig's two windows were installed in the church of Christ the King, Amesbury depicting 'Jesus Christ the Apple Tree' to the left and 'The Firmament' to the right of the altar. St Theresa's Convent Chapel, Effingham, Surrey has two of Haig's works, a four panel window and a single one on the theme of "light" dated 1987. A year later, in 1988, Haig created two windows each comprising three panels and a triangle for St Peter's Convent, Woking.

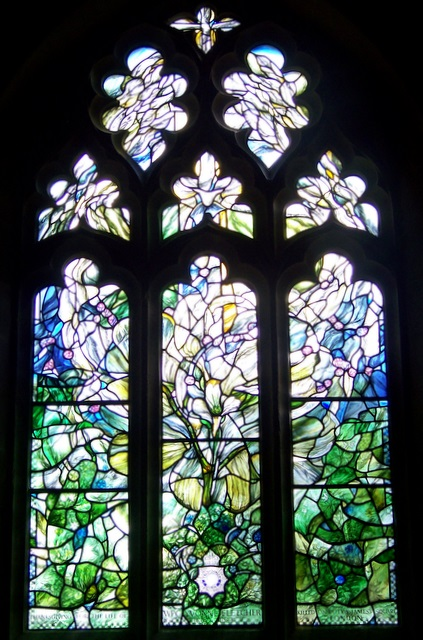
Memorial window to WPC Yvonne Fletcher

One of Haig's best-known works is the memorial window for WPC Yvonne Fletcher, who was shot and killed while on duty during the Libyan Embassy siege on 17 April 1984. The window, in the lady chapel of St Leonard's Church in Yvonne Fletcher's home town of Semley, Wiltshire, was dedicated by the Bishop of Salisbury on 17 April 1988. At the bottom of the centre light is the badge of the Metropolitan Police, and Yvonne's name is along the base of the three lights.

Haig was commissioned to produce a window to commemorate the 50th anniversary of RAF Lyneham, paid for with funds raised from air personnel contributions. The official launch of the work, in St Michael's and All Saints, Lyneham, Wiltshire, was celebrated at a service for the anniversary by the Queen on 17 May 1990.

Most, but not all, of Haig's work is installed in religious buildings. In February 1991, Haig's "Minerva" comprising six windows was installed in a surgery in Bath, Somerset.

On 22 November 1992, the Michael James memorial window was installed in the archway of the west door in Wimborne Minster. Haig took inspiration from the phrase "praise to the Holiest in the height and in depth be praise" from Elgar's 'Dream of Gerontius' which Michael James, the church's assistant organist, had been studying prior to his death in 1981.

"The Creed" and "Garden of Eden" windows in St Leonard's parish church, Priors Marston, Warwickshire were installed in 1993.

The north rose window in St Mary's Church, Swanage, installed in 1994, depicts The Creation. Haig's other works in Dorset also include the golden oculus for St Mark's Church in Highcliffe, which represents Alpha and Omega and fills a space in the gallery wall originally occupied by the organ. Other Dorset works include the 'Journey from Stourhead' screen and chapel windows in Shaftesbury Hospital, and a glass dome, cross and the cabinet for the chapel of the Joseph Weld Hospice in Dorchester.

In 1994 Haig provided the east window for St Stephen's York, replacing a window destroyed by arson in 1992. The design was inspired by the writing of Alcuin of York "In word and in example let thy light shine in the black dark like the morning star". The centre panel shows Saint Stephen's arms raised looking up to heaven and seeing the vision of Christ. In the top right of the window, three hunched figures represent the martyrs of every age.

In 1995 the south aisle of St. Michael Shalbourne, Wiltshire, gained a two light window depicting St. Luke and the Blessed Virgin Mary. Atypical for Haig, the non-abstract, figurative, design was by another, respected, stained-glass artist, Karl Parsons, who had lived locally.

In 1997 two lights depicting rural scenes were added to the church of St Edith, Baverstock, Wiltshire. Also that year Haig's arched window was installed at All Saints, Newland, 'The Cathedral of the Forest', and dedicated, in 2000, to the memory of its donor, Joan and her husband, Henry Ludlam.

In 1998 Haig's windows were installed in the church of the Most Holy Name and St. Edward, Shaftesbury. Haig started work on this in 1996, working with the congregation to refine the design, drawing on the colours of the windows in Nantes Cathedral. He used traditional construction with lead came and French, English and German mouth-blown glass. Fired iron oxides and silver stain were used to produce the desired colours and effects.

Haig's twelve windows in the church of Douai Abbey, Thatcham, were blessed by Abbot Geoffrey Scott OSB on 20 November 1999.

Haig was commissioned to create a stained glass window to celebrate the millennium for St Michael & All Angels' church, Alsop-en-le-Dale, Derbyshire. Its theme is "I saw a new heaven and a new earth", from the Book of Revelation. The Bishop of Derby dedicated the window on 30 September 2001. Haig also created a window for the south aisle of St Mary's Church, Fordingbridge in 2000.

Henry Wylie Haig died in Yeovil on 6 December 2007, aged 77.
