= St. Aldhelm's Chapel, St. Aldhelm's Head =

St Aldhelm's Chapel
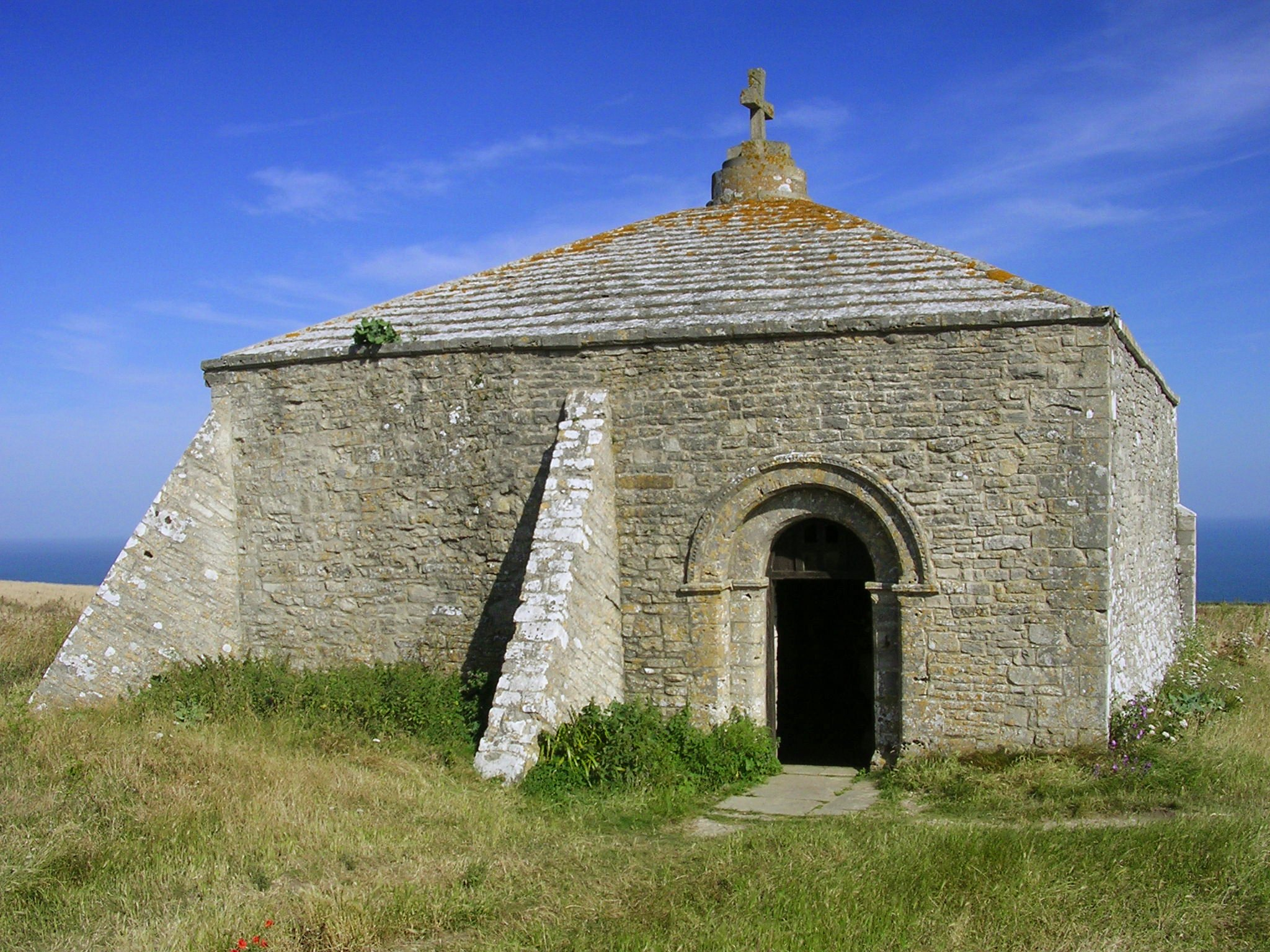
- St Aldhelm's Chapel (2005)

- Location in Dorset
- 50.5797°N 2.0568°W
- Location: St Aldhelm's Head, Dorset
- Country: England
- Denomination: Church of England
- Previous denomination: Roman Catholic

History
- Founded: 13th century

Architecture
- Heritage designation: Grade I Listed building
- Designated: 18 March 1955
- Style: Norman

Administration
- Province: Canterbury
- Diocese: Diocese of Salisbury
- Parish: Worth Matravers

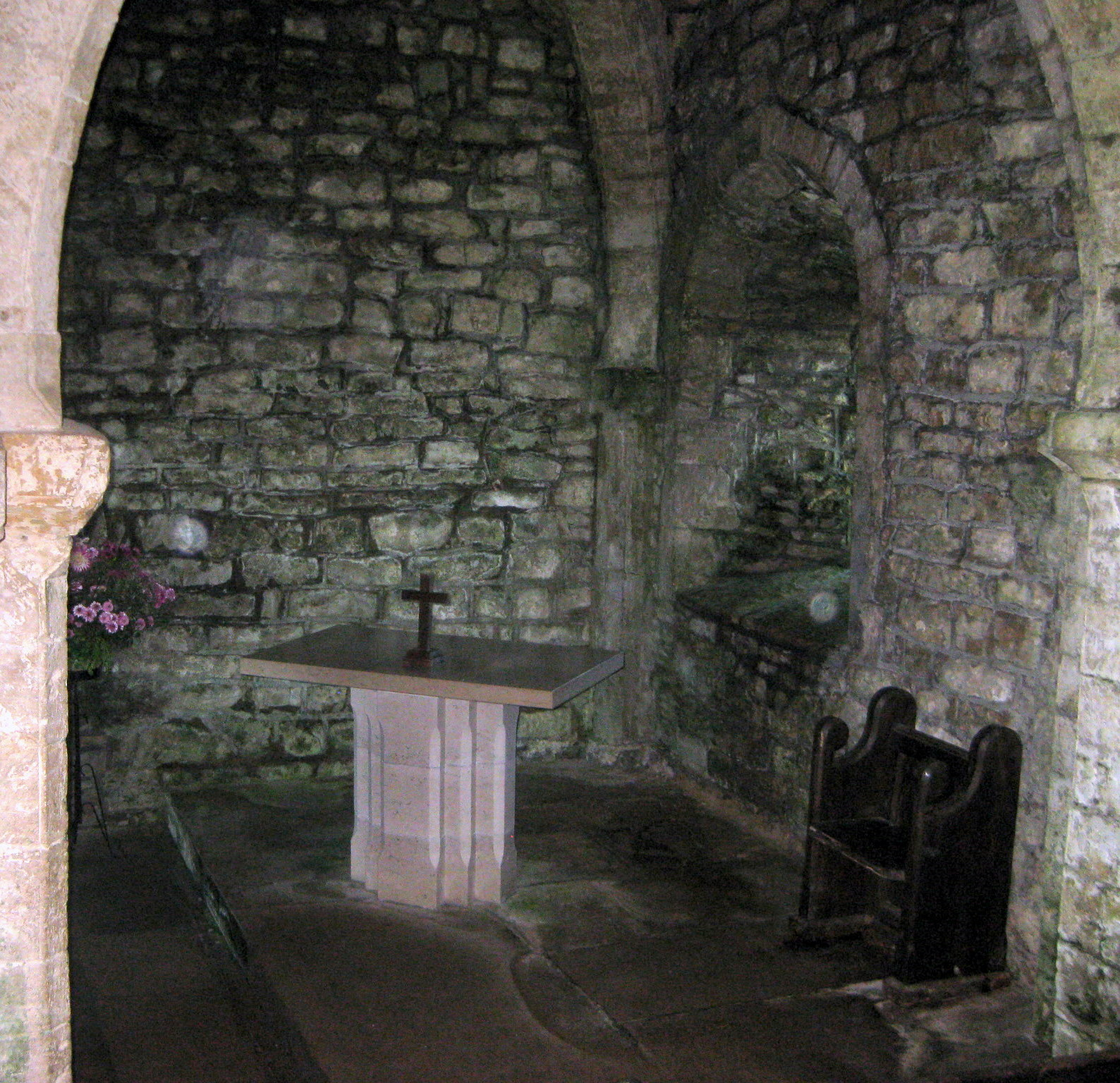
St Aldhelm's Head Chapel interior view

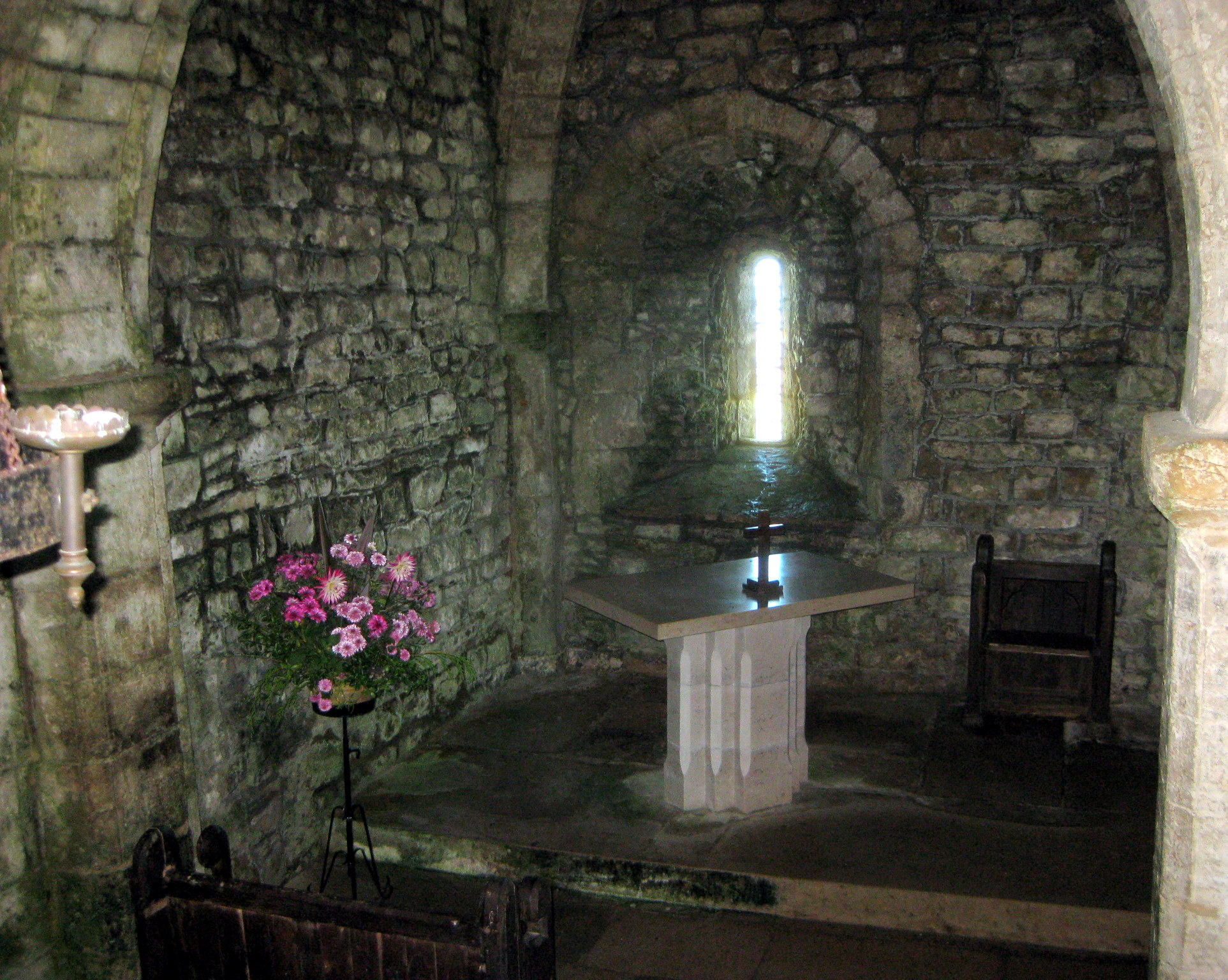
St Aldhelm's Head Chapel interior view

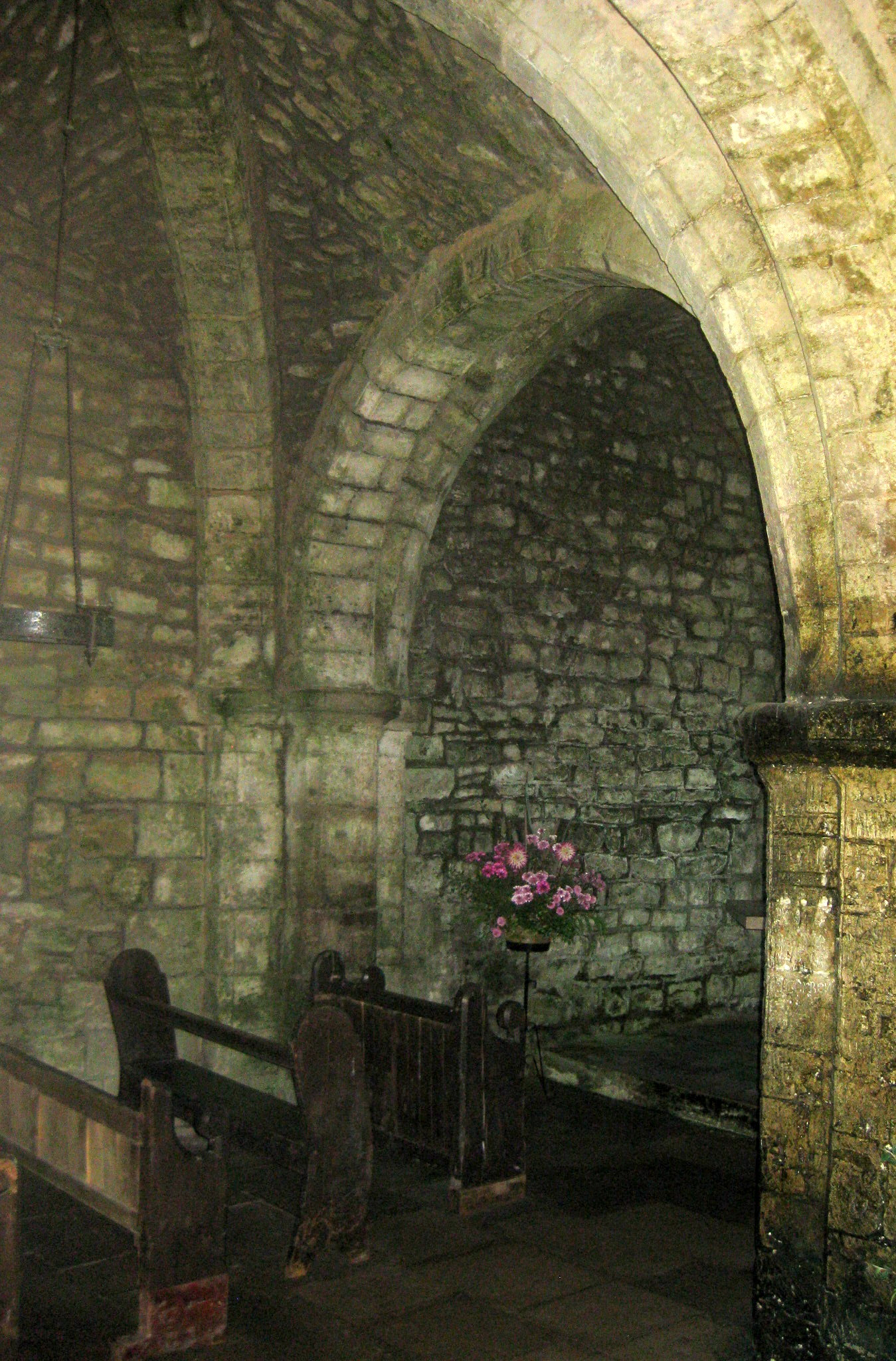
St Aldhelm's Head Chapel interior view

St Aldhelm's Chapel is a Norman chapel on St Aldhelm's Head in the parish of Worth Matravers, Swanage, Dorset. It stands close to the cliffs, 108 metres (354 ft) above sea level. It is a Grade I listed building.

The square stone chapel stands within a low circular earthwork, which may be the remains of a pre-Conquest Christian enclosure. The building has several architectural features which are unusual for a chapel: the square shape, the orientation of the corners of the building towards the cardinal points, and the division and restriction of the interior space by a large central column.

The lack of evidence for an altar or a piscina suggests that the building may not have been built as a chapel. It may have originally been built as a watchtower for Corfe Castle, covering the sea approaches to the south. Its identification as a purpose-built chapel rests on records of payments to a chaplain in the reign of King Henry III (1216–1272).

The interior of the chapel is approximately 7.7 metres (25 ft) square. In the centre is a square pier supporting four square rib vaults, with the heavy ribs leading to transverse arches, all stop-chamfered. In the north-west side is a Norman round-arched doorway. A small window is contemporary with the doorway. The corners of the chapel are orientated towards the cardinal points. The interior of the chapel contains a 12th-century groin vault, supported by a central column. Evidence uncovered during 20th century repairs to the chapel roof suggest that it may have been topped with a beacon at some time. The roof now bears a stone cross erected in 1873.

In 1957 a monumental slab of Purbeck stone was uncovered by ploughing in a field 400 metres (1,300 ft) NNE of the chapel. The slab, about 2 metres (6 ft 7 in) long and 0.75 metres (2 ft 6 in) wide at the head, was carved with a Celtic-style cross in relief. Below the slab was a grave containing the skeleton of a woman with arms crossed, placed within a row of upright stones. Eight pieces of iron, with traces of wood, were also found in the grave. The woman's age was estimated at 30 to 40 years, and the grave dated to the late 13th century. Nearby were the foundations of a building 2 metres (6 ft 7 in) square. The slab is now in the porch of St Nicholas' Church, Worth Matravers.

== History ==
The chapel first appears in written records during the reign of King Henry III when it, and the chapel of St Mary in Corfe Castle, were served by a chaplain, paid 50 shillings a year by the County Sheriff on behalf of the Crown. In 1291 the parish of the chapel of St Aldhelm was rated at 20 shillings for tax. In 1428 the parish was again assessed at 20 shillings, but was described as having no inhabitants. The sale of the nearby Manor of Renscombe in 1557 or 1558 included the advowson of the chapel of Renscombe. This may have been St Aldhelm's Chapel, as a map of 1737 shows the headland and chapel (marked as "St Abbon's chapel") as part of the manor. In 1625 the chapel was described by surveyor Thomas Gerard as serving as a sea-marke. The central column of the chapel bears dates and initials from the 17th century, indicating that it was still visited, although falling into disrepair. A hole in this column appears to have been used by young girls to make wishes, by dropping pins or hairpins into it.

The chapel appears to have gone out of use some time before 1625. By 1797 the roof of the chapel was described as being partly fallen in. In 1800 William Morton Pitt, the owner of Encombe, a neighbouring farm, became interested in repairing the chapel, and may have carried out minor repairs. He sold Encombe in 1807 to the 1st Earl of Eldon (1751–1838) who also purchased Renscombe in 1811. By this time the chapel roof was described as being overgrown in grass, and with parts of the groins collapsed. Eldon ordered the repair of the groins, but it appears that no major repairs were carried out. Repairs were carried out by local landowners during the 19th century, and the chapel was reopened for church services in 1874.

Articles by the Reverend John Austin in 1858 and H.J. Moule in 1893 describe Whit Thursday festivities at the chapel; a procession by the villagers of Worth Matravers to the Head accompanied by music, followed by the dressing of the chapel with flags and flowers, and dancing. Moule mentions further processions and dances on Worth Fair Day and Club Day. It appears that at this time the chapel was being used as a store for the coastguards.

By 1873 the chapel had been reconstructed, the cost being borne by the 3rd Earl of Eldon (1845–1926), who also presented the baptismal font. A service was held on 18 July 1874 to commemorate the reopening, at which Alfred Gibson, son of the chief boatman of the coastguards, was baptised. The chapel was used for regular services on Sunday evenings. During the late 19th and early 20th centuries regular weekly services were held, attended by coastguards and their families who lived in nearby cottages. The neighbouring Renscombe Farm was used for radar research during the Second World War, and the chapel was used infrequently.

By the 1930s the interior of the chapel had become extremely damp, and because of this an organ used for the services had to be stored elsewhere when not required. Services at this time appear to have been held fortnightly, and at Rogationtide. The chapel had at some point to be secured by a gate and fence to prevent cows from entering. This was removed in 1963.

In November 1965 the chapel was given by the Encombe Estate to Worth Matravers Parochial Church Council. The Council carried out repairs, funded in part by voluntary donations. In 2000 the surrounding earthworks, described as an Early Christian enclosure, were designated as a Scheduled Monument.

In 2005, as part of the celebrations of the 1,300th anniversary of the consecration of St. Aldhelm as Bishop of Sherborne, a new altar table was made from stone from St Aldhelm's quarry. This was consecrated on 4 June 2005 by Rowan Williams, Archbishop of Canterbury.

== Bibliography ==
- Pevsner, Nikolaus (2002). Dorset. Yale University Press. ISBN 0-300-09598-8.
- Ward Lock’s Illustrated Guide Book: Swanage and South Dorset (12th ed.). Ward, Lock & Co. 1933.
- Malins, Judith (2005). St. Aldhelm's Chapel at St. Aldhelm's Head (8th ed.). The Parishes of the Purbeck Hills.
- Day, Michael (2 October 2000). "Worth Matravers, (St. Aldhelm's Chapel)". Dorset Churches. Archived from the original on 20 May 2011.
