= Lobster Liberation Front =

Animal rights campaign

The Lobster Liberation Front (LLF) is an animal rights campaign which first appeared on the coast of Dorset, England in 2004, later spreading to Wales and Scotland. Their methods include releasing lobsters in live storage and sabotaging lobster pots or fishing boats.

The LLF consider boiling lobsters alive (the traditional method for cooking them) unacceptable and use direct action to prevent it. Their claim that lobsters, which possess a rudimentary nervous system, can feel pain, is the subject of ongoing scientific debate.

== Direct action ==
=== 2004 ===
In March, the village of Worth Matravers, Dorset was targeted when the individuals twice wrecked a fisherman's boat and set lobsters free. The actions were reported to the Southern Animal Rights Coalition, sent anonymously by the LLF. Shortly following this action, £1,000 worth of damage was made in June when it was presumed activists targeted a fisherman's potts in Cardigan and in Crymych, Wales.

=== 2006 ===
A large number of lobster fishermen's pots were damaged in Stranraer, Scotland, with graffiti left at the scene indicating the group had carried out the attacks.
