= Worth Matravers =

Village in Dorset, England

Coordinates: 50.5968°N 2.0382°W

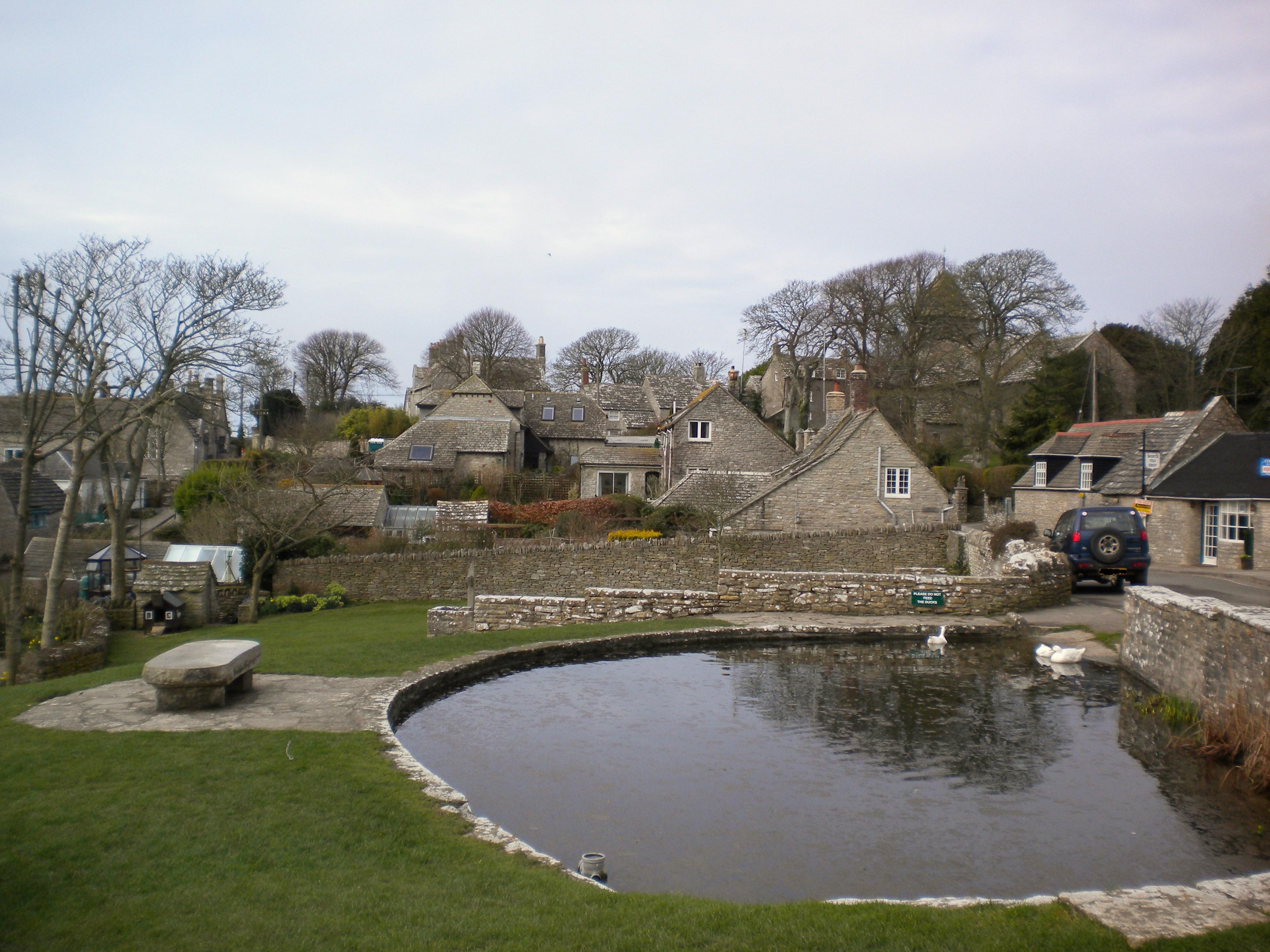
- Village pond, Worth Matravers

- Location within Dorset
- Population: 638 (parish)
- OS grid reference: SY975775
- Civil parish: Worth Matravers
- Unitary authority: Dorset
- Ceremonial county: Dorset
- Region: South West
- Country: England
- Sovereign state: United Kingdom
- Post town: SWANAGE
- Postcode district: BH19
- Dialling code: 01929
- Police: Dorset
- Fire: Dorset and Wiltshire
- Ambulance: South Western
- UK Parliament: South Dorset

Worth Matravers (/məˈtrævərz/) is a village and civil parish in the English county of Dorset. The village is situated on the cliffs west of Swanage. It comprises limestone cottages and farm houses and is built around a pond, which is a regular feature on postcards of the Isle of Purbeck.

The civil parish stretches from the coast northwards to, and just beyond, the A351 road from Corfe Castle to Swanage. The village of Worth Matravers is situated on side roads towards the south of the parish, which also includes the village of Harman's Cross on the main road to the north.

== Etymology ==
The earliest attestation of the name of Worth Matravers occurs in the Domesday Book of 1086, where the settlement was simply called 'Worth' (represented by a range of spellings including Wirde, Orde, and Urda). This name originates in Old English: worth, meaning 'an enclosure'. The Matravers element was added to disambiguate the place from others of the same name: it is the family name of John Matravers, who held the estate from 1335.

== History ==
Archaeological investigations at the site known as "Football Field" revealed frequent activity from the early Neolithic to the early medieval period, including a Neolithic enclosure, a Bronze-Age roundhouse, settlement during the Iron Age and Roman period, and an inhumation cemetery from shortly after the Roman period. Archaeogenetic research at the cemetery showed genetic continuity from Britain's Iron-Age population to the population of the cemetery, with little influence from the genetically Continental northern European population that became dominant in Eastern English cemeteries during the Roman and early medieval periods.

The cliffs of Worth Matravers were the site of a Chain Home radar station during World War II, which was instrumental in the development of radar when the Telecommunications Research Establishment outstation shared the site from 1940 until 1942 when it was relocated to Malvern, Worcestershire.

In 2004, local fishermen were targeted with a sabotage campaign by the so-called "Lobster Liberation Front", a fringe animal rights group operating in the area.

In September 2006, it was reported that the BBC soap opera EastEnders had been filming in the village for a storyline involving the Wicks family. The village centre, and the area around the Square and Compass pub, were used as locations.

== Geography ==
To the south of Worth Matravers village are the limestone cliffs of the English Channel coast. These are situated on the South West Coast Path and are part of the Jurassic Coast World Heritage Site. This coastline is popular with tourists in the summer months, with the rocky beaches of Winspit, Seacombe and Chapman's Pool situated within walking distance of the village.

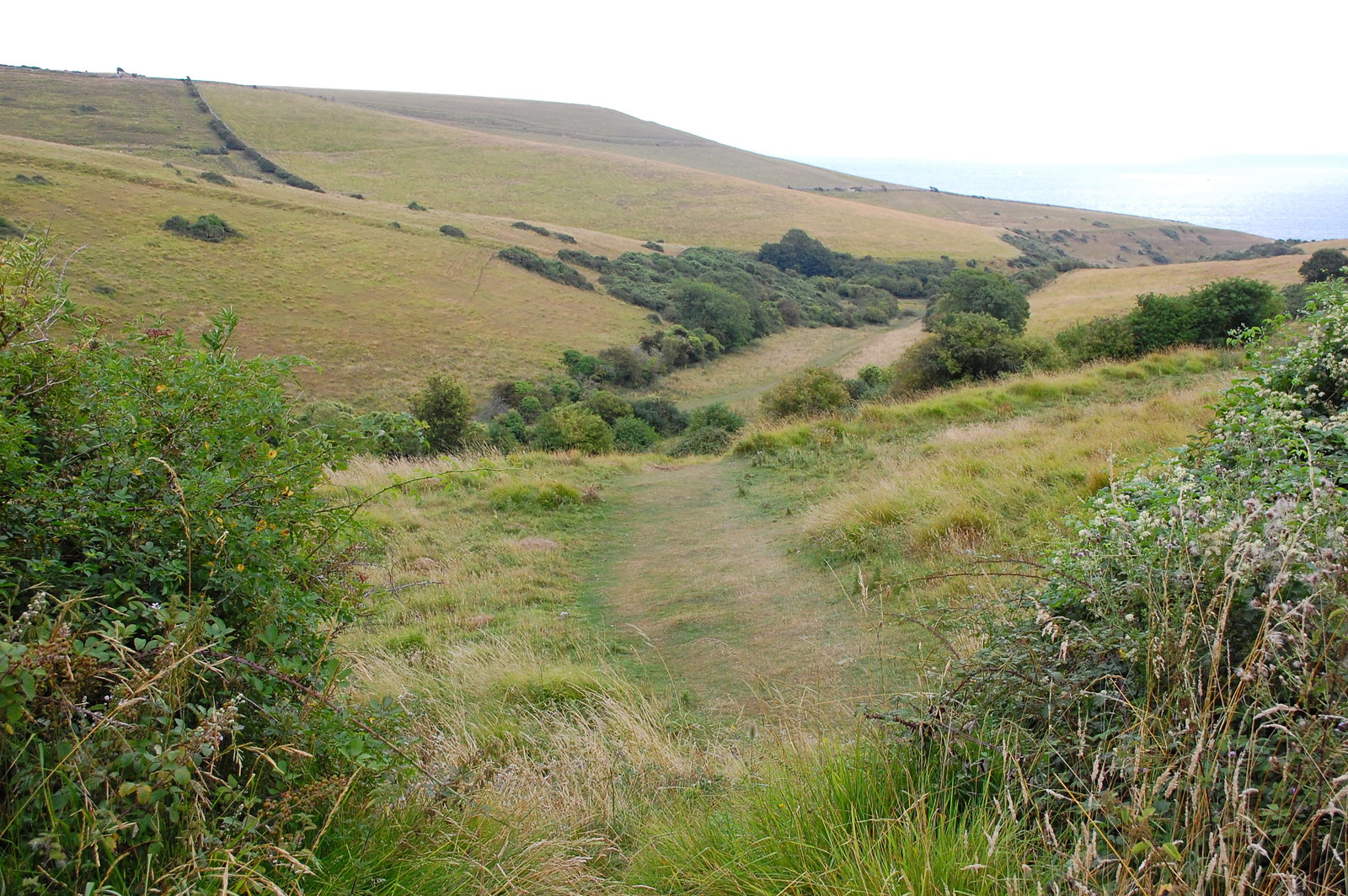
Hills to the south of Worth Matravers approaching the English Channel and the South West Coast Path

To the north of the village and parish are the chalk Purbeck Hills. Many tourists pass through this area on the Swanage Railway, a steam locomotive operated heritage railway. Harman's Cross railway station on that railway is within the parish boundaries, but a significant distance from the village centre of Worth Matravers.

The parish includes the settlement of Harman's Cross to the north, and has an area of 10.98 square kilometres. In the 2011 census it had 285 households and a population of 638. The parish formed part of the Purbeck local government district until its replacement by the Dorset unitary authority in April 2019. It is located within the South Dorset constituency of the House of Commons. Prior to Brexit in 2020, it was in the South West England constituency of the European Parliament.

== Economy ==
Traditionally the village's economy was based on farming, quarrying and fishing. As of 2019, two quarries – Swanworth and St Aldhelm's – are still in operation. Both arable and pasture farming are still central to the village's economy.

In March 2022, it was announced that the National Trust had purchased the 350 acre Weston Farm, in the village, adding to its other landholdings in the village and its vicinity such as Spyway.

== Places of interest ==
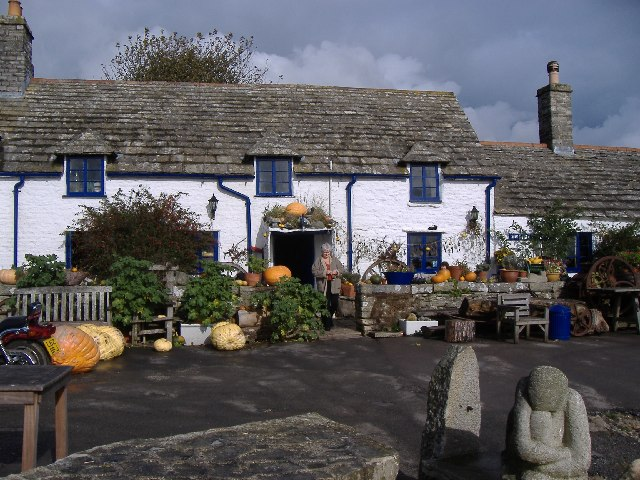
The Square and Compass

A monument on St Aldhelm's head, about a mile from the village, commemorates the development of radar by the Telecommunications Research Establishment at RAF Worth Matravers which was also one of the Chain Home radar stations during World War II, which proved decisive in the allied victory of that war. A Royal Observer Corps monitoring post is situated in the layby on the road to Worth Matravers.

About a mile from the village is Winspit, an old quarry on the cliffs. This was used as a filming location for an episode of Blake's 7 and also in two Doctor Who stories.

On the bluff of the headland is the Norman Saint Aldhelm's Chapel dedicated to St Aldhelm, Bishop of Sherborne. The village's parish church of St Nicholas of Myra dates from the 12th century and is Grade I listed.

The village is also well known for the Square and Compass, a Grade II listed public house, which has operated since 1793. It is on the Campaign for Real Ale's National Inventory of Historic Pub Interiors. It holds an annual week-long stone carving festival and accommodates a small museum exhibiting fossils and other local artefacts.

== Notable people ==
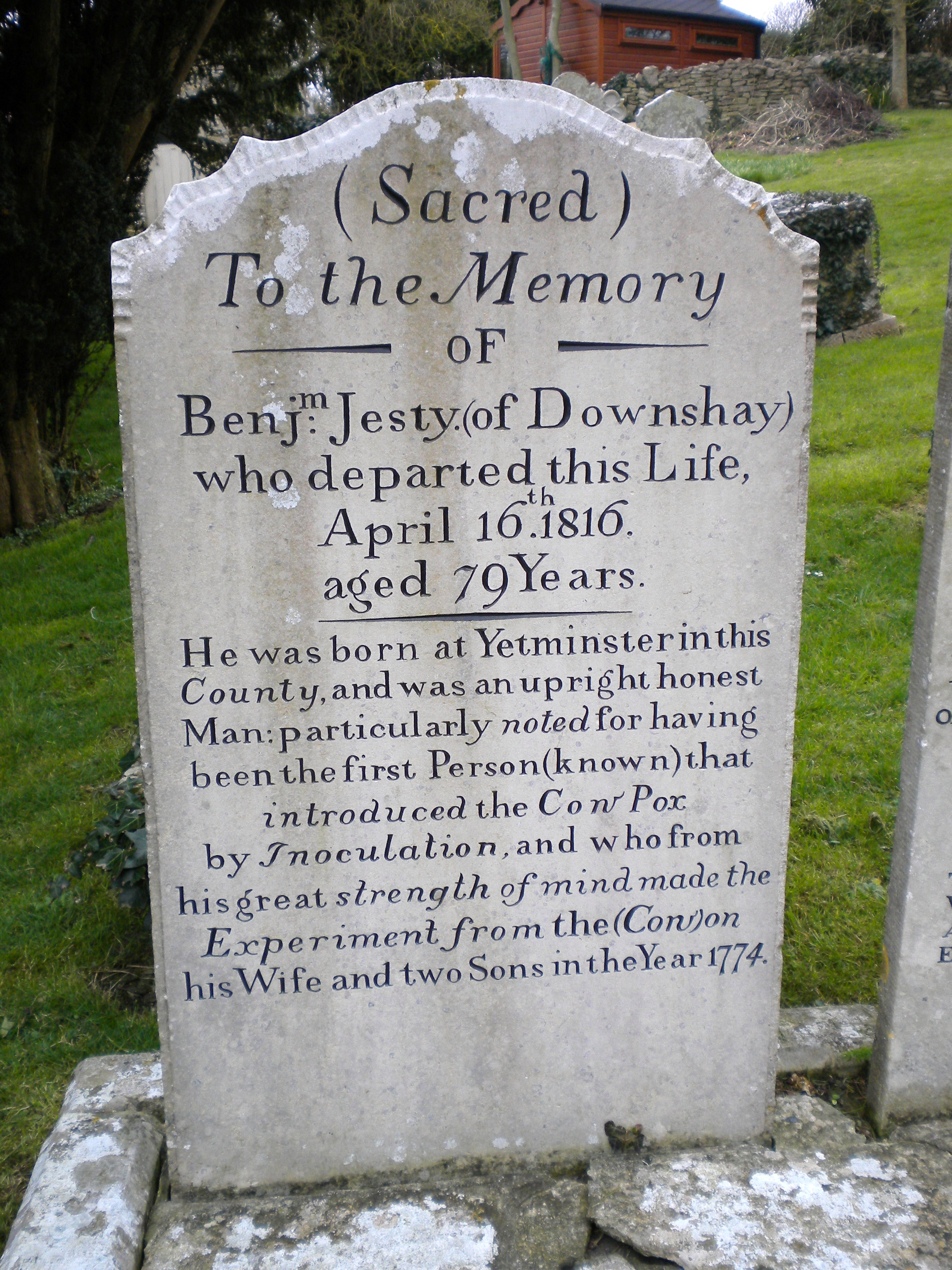
The grave of Benjamin Jesty, the cowpox vaccination pioneer; at right is the grave of his wife Elizabeth.

- The tombs of Benjamin Jesty, a farmer who is reported to have vaccinated his family against smallpox having made the same observations as Edward Jenner and a while earlier, but kept quiet about it, and his wife, are side by side in the churchyard. Jesty's family may be the first recorded deliberate attempt to induce immunity to smallpox using cowpox, or it may have been a more widespread activity prior to its systematisation.
- Sculptors Sir Anthony Caro (1924-2013) and Mary Spencer Watson (1913-2006) are buried in the village's churchyard.
- The first President of the Supreme Court of the United Kingdom, Lord Phillips, took Worth Matravers as part of his title.
