= Sebastian Horsley =

British artist

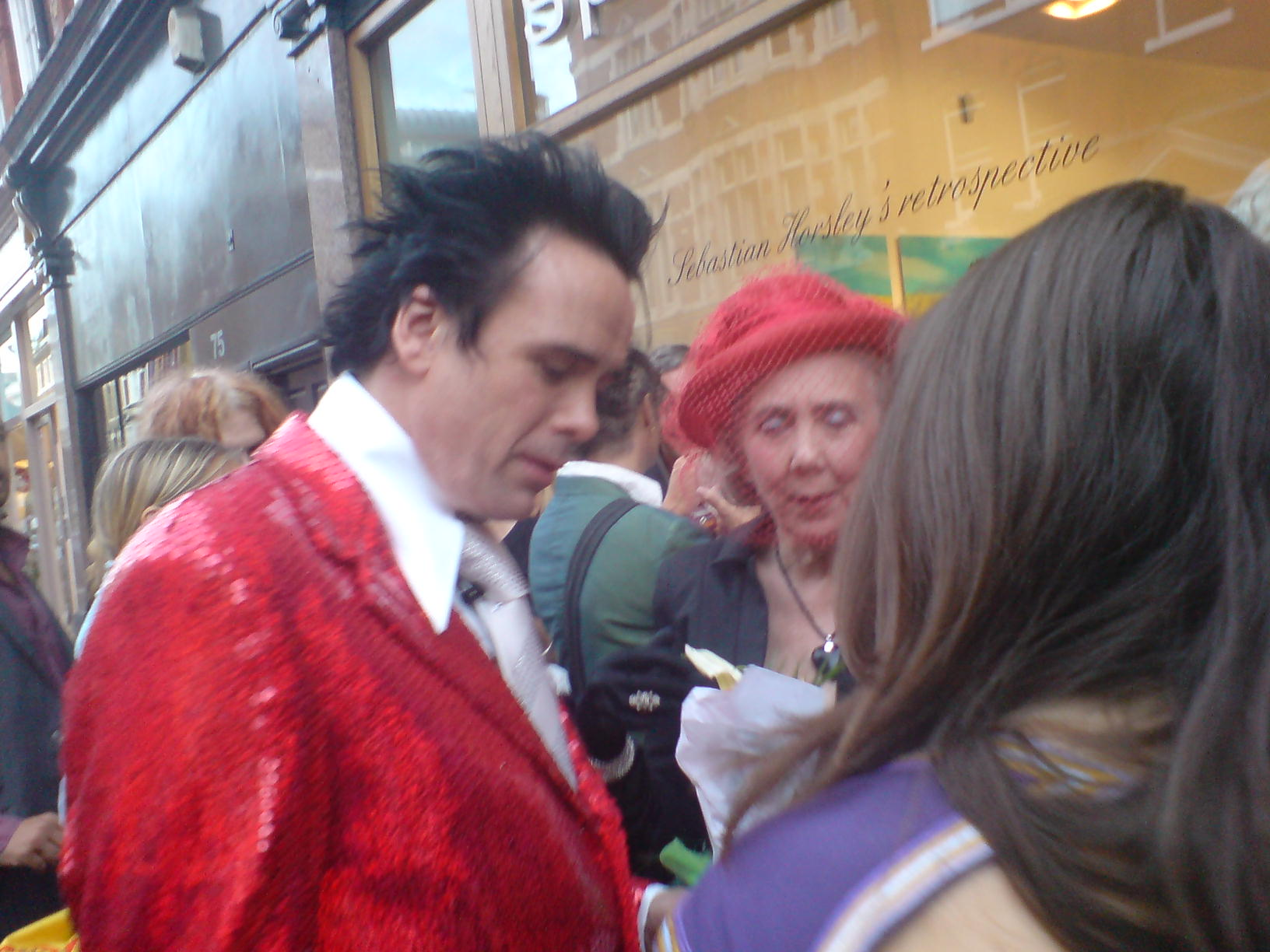
- Sebastian Horsley and his mother at a retrospective of his work at Spectrum London gallery, London, 2007.
- Born: Marcus A. Horsley; 8 August 1962; Holderness, East Riding of Yorkshire, England
- Died: 17 June 2010 (aged 47); London, England
- Occupations: Artist, writer
- Spouse: Evlynn Smith (m. 1983–1990)

Sebastian Horsley (born Marcus A. Horsley; 8 August 1962 – 17 June 2010) was an English artist and writer. Horsley's writing often revolved around his dysfunctional family, his flamboyant and eccentric behaviour, his drug addictions, sex, and his reliance on prostitutes.

== Background ==
Horsley was born in Holderness in the East Riding of Yorkshire. He was the eldest son of Nicholas Horsley, and with a younger brother, Jasun Horsley, attended Pocklington School as a day-boy in the early 1980s. Their grandfather, Alec Horsley, was the founder of Northern Foods. Their father replaced him as chairman of the company from 1970 until the role was assumed by Christopher Haskins. According to Horsley's autobiography, Dandy in the Underworld, his birth name was Marcus, but his mother decided to change it to Sebastian by the time she had returned from the hospital. His name was officially changed by deed poll in 1967.

Horsley had an older sister, a psychotherapist named Ashley, and a younger brother, Jasun Horsley. His mother, the former Valerie Edwards, was a Welsh typist. After his parents divorced, Horsley's father married Sabitha Sarkar (married 1975–1987), and Alwyne Law (married 1998). His mother did not remarry, but later became known as Valerie Walmsley-Hunter.

As Horsley wrote in his memoirs, following the divorce of his parents in 1975: "Clearly everyone in my life who should have been vertical was horizontal." In an interview Horsley's mother gave to The Sunday Times, she admitted that her son's childhood was profoundly difficult: "I don't think Nicholas ever went to bed sober and I was always in a fog. Sebastian and my other two children were accidents and, though it seems shocking to admit, I drank all the way through my pregnancies."

In 1983, Horsley married Evlynn Anne Smith (8 September 1962 – 18 April 2003), the daughter of a Scottish painter and decorator, and who, together with Meriel Scott, constituted the art and furniture-design company Precious McBane. Horsley and Smith separated in 1990. She died of an aneurysm at age 40. Smith was also the lover of Jimmy Boyle.

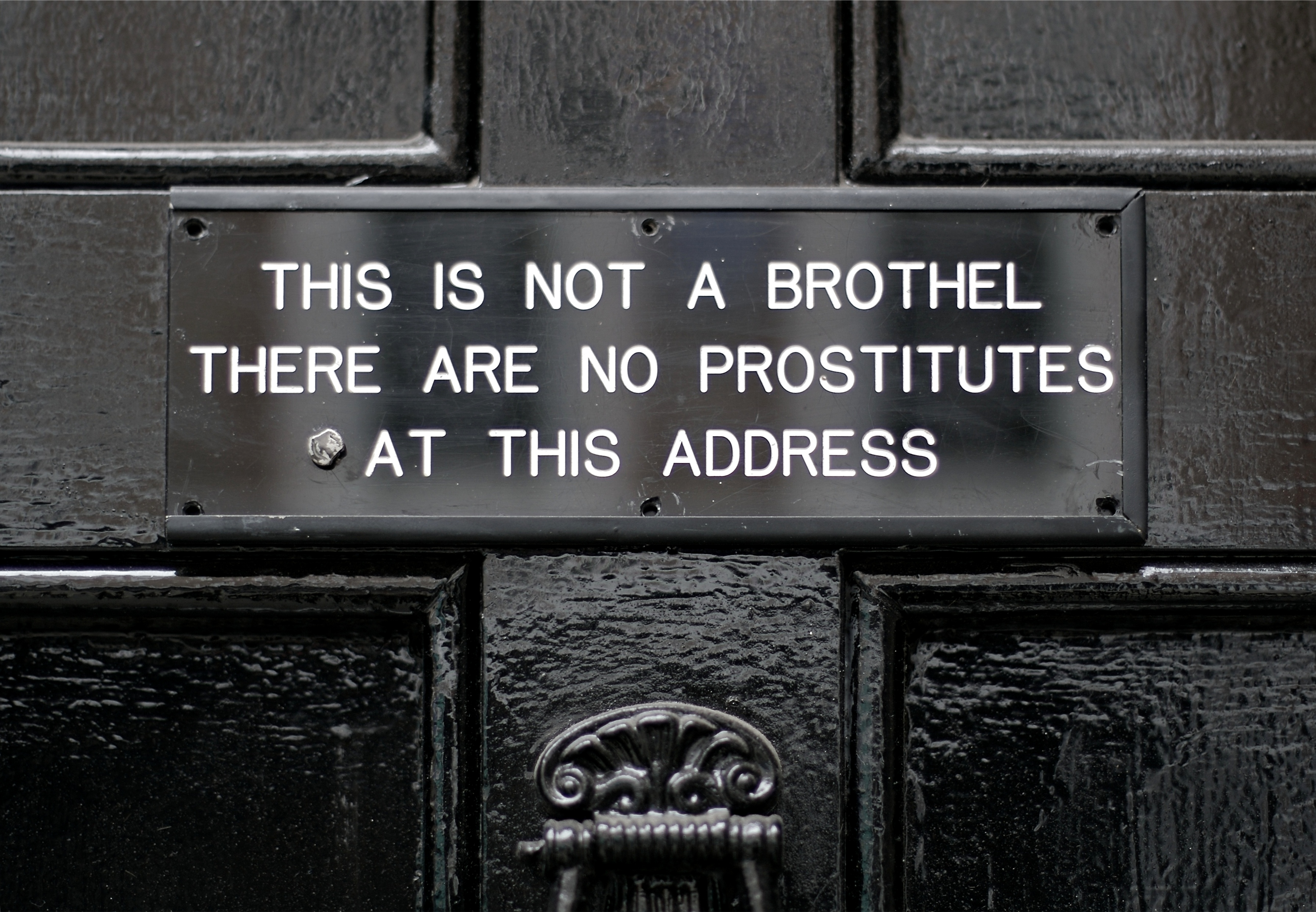
The sign at the entrance to the home of Sebastian Horsley

Horsley lived at 7 Meard Street, Soho, London. A sign on the door once read: "THIS IS NOT A BROTHEL / THERE ARE NO PROSTITUTES AT THIS ADDRESS", as doorways on the street were often used by scammers to trick punters out of money, inevitably leading to angry confrontations with the innocent occupants.

== Art and writing ==
In August 2000, Horsley travelled to the Philippines to experience a crucifixion, in order to prepare for a series of paintings on the topic. Refusing pain killers, he was nailed to a cross and passed out. The foot rest broke and he only avoided serious injury by being caught by onlookers. A film and photos of the event, as well as his subsequent paintings of crosses, were exhibited in London in 2002; The nails used for the crucifixion are on display in The Viktor Wynd Museum of Curiosities, Fine Art & Natural History, together with his red sequinned suit by Richard Anderson of Savile Row and other ephemera.

In a 2004 editorial article in The Observer, he described his preference for sex with prostitutes: "What I hate with women generally is the intimacy, the invasion of my innermost space, the slow strangulation of my art." He stated that he had worked as a prostitute for a while. He argued that prostitution should not be legalized, as that would take away part of its thrill.

From 1998 to 2004, Horsley contributed a column to the monthly Erotic Review. In early 2006, Horsley together with Marion McBride began to run a weekly sex advice column in The Observer. Four months later, after objectionable discussions of oral and anal sex led to numerous complaints from outraged readers, the column was discontinued.

In 2006, Horsley, a self-described dandy, praised his chosen home of Soho in an article, though he had grown increasingly unhappy at what he saw as the decline of Soho as a centre of loose morals and bohemian bars, bemoaning the closure of haunts such as the Colony Room. Speaking following the death of the Colony Room's last proprietor Michael Wojas in June 2010, a week before his own death, he told The Independent: " The air used to be clean and the sex used to be dirty. Now it is the other way around. Soho has lost its heart."

In September 2007, the Spectrum London gallery staged Hookers, Dealers, Tailors, a retrospective by Horsley. The show documented his diving in Australian shark-infested water and copiously ingesting deadly drugs.

His memoir, Dandy in the Underworld, named after the T.Rex album of same name (Horsley counted Marc Bolan as one of his idols) was published in the UK by Sceptre in September 2007 and in the US in March 2008 from Harper Perennial.

A one-man play, Dandy in the Underworld, written and directed by Tim Fountain opened at the Soho Theatre in London on 15 June 2010, one day before Horsley's death. In the premier production the role of Horsley, the sole character in the play, was performed by Milo Twomey.

Following his death, in 2012 many of his personal items were turned into relics and exhibited and sold at The Last Tuesday Society's Gallery Viktor Wynd Fine Art. The bulk of his wardrobe was given to the Museum of London by Rachel Garley, his partner and main beneficiary.

In 2015, Horsley's younger brother, Jasun Horsley, published Seen and Not Seen: Confessions of a Movie Autist, for Zero Books, the last two chapters of which give an insider's view of Horsley's death, and challenge aspects of Horsley's memoir.

== U.S. entry denied ==
Horsley was denied entry into the United States on 19 March 2008, after arriving at Newark Airport for a book tour. Immigration officers denied his entry claiming issues of moral turpitude. A customs official said that "...travellers who have been convicted of a crime involving moral turpitude (which includes controlled-substance violations) or admit to previously having a drug addiction are not admissible...". After eight hours of questioning, he was placed on a plane and sent back to London. Horsley had told the Associated Press that he had prepared for the visit. His one concession to immigration requirements, he said, had been the removal of his nail polish.

== Death ==
Horsley was found dead at his London home on 17 June 2010 of a heroin and cocaine overdose. A friend, the journalist Toby Young, said he believed Horsley's death was an accident: "If it had been suicide, Sebastian would not have passed up the opportunity to write a note. It's a tragic loss of life." In an interview in April 2008, Horsley romanticised dying "destitute in the arms of a prostitute," though not immediately dying "if that's alright with you."

His funeral took place on 1 July 2010, at St James's, Piccadilly, and was attended by more than 400 mourners, among them Marc Almond and the writer Will Self. Horsley's coffin arrived at the church in a horse-drawn hearse. Among those who paid tribute to him was Stephen Fry who spoke of his friend's "essential sweetness" and his "brown eyes" that stopped "just short of pleading". The journalist Rod Liddle read The Deathbed by Siegfried Sassoon. The coffin was carried out of the church to the strains of Marc Bolan's "20th Century Boy".

At the inquest on 17 August 2010 the Westminster Coroner, Dr Paul Knapman, decided that "[Horsley] was known to have abused drugs and to that extent he has been the author of his own misfortune."
