= West Cornwall Pasty Company =

Fast food chain in the United Kingdom

West Cornwall Pasty Co. Limited

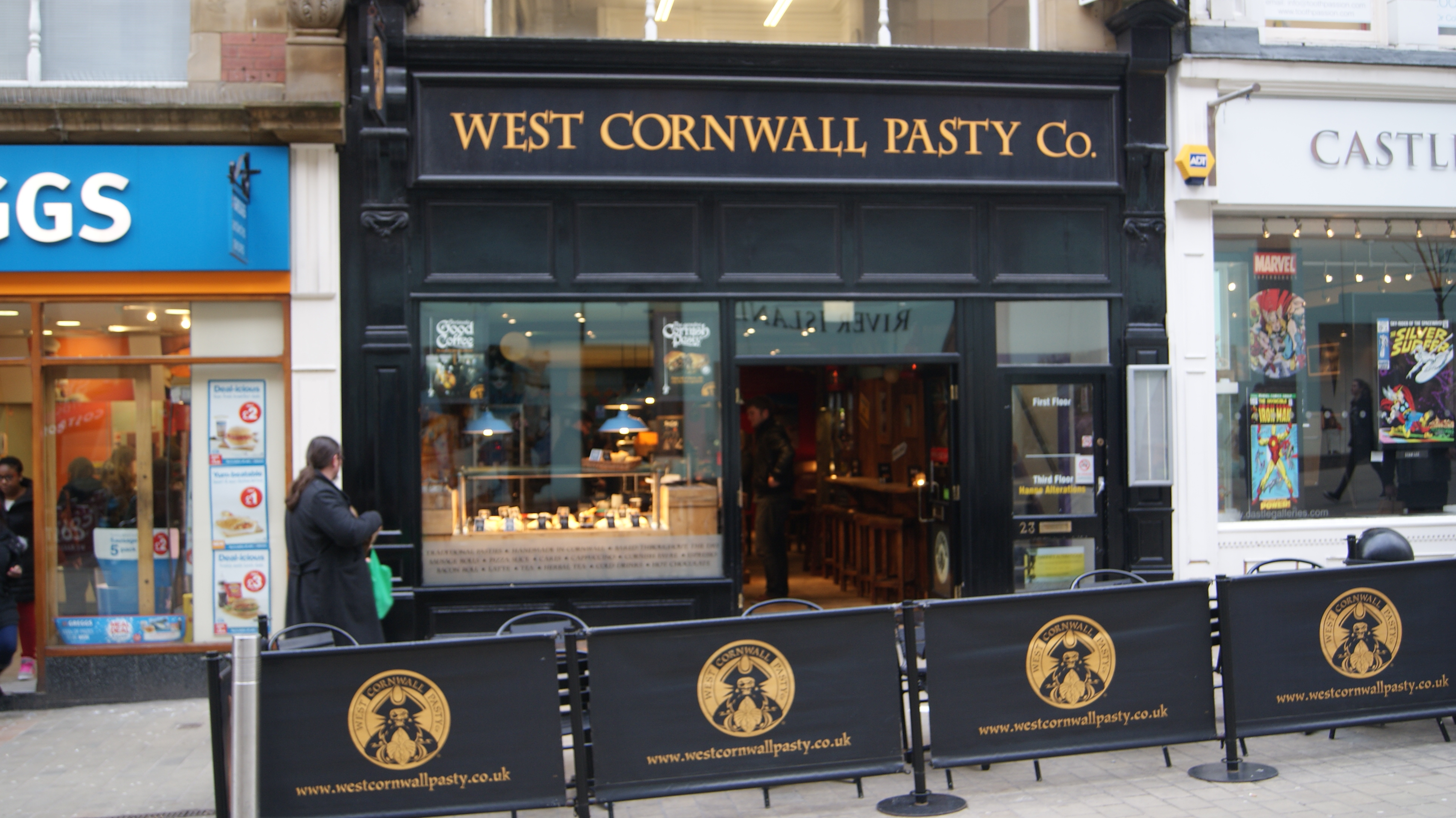
- West Cornwall Pasty Company, Albion Place, Leeds
- Type: Subsidiary
- Industry: Restaurant
- Genre: Fast-food
- Founded: 1998
- Founder: Ken Cocking & sons, sisters Victoria and Sarah Barber
- Area served: United Kingdom
- Owner: Samworth Brothers
- Website: westcornwallpasty.co.uk

West Cornwall Pasty Co. Limited is a fast food chain in the United Kingdom specialising in making and selling pasties. The company was established in 1998 and has been owned by Mark and David Samworth since 2017.

== History ==
West Cornwall Pasty Company was launched in 1998 by Ken Cocking, a serial entrepreneur, along with his sons, Arron and Gavin, and Mark Christophers. The first store was opened in Chippenham, Wiltshire, and the firm was initially financed by family and friends. After nine years, Cockings sold the company to its management for £40 million in October 2007.

At the time, the company had four hundred staff in 55 establishments of various types. By July 2013, it was reported to employ around 450 staff in eighty locations, including eighteen in London. The pasty was originally a portable meal of meat and potatoes in a pastry case, made for tin miners in Cornwall to take underground.

In April 2014, the private equity house Gresham, the owners of the company, put it into administration, blaming its failure on the government's decision to charge VAT on pasties. The company was subsequently sold to another private equity fund, Endless, backed by Danny Mills, former Leeds United F.C. and England footballer, and others. Losses were reduced by expanding the company's range and by taking a more targeted approach, concentrating on outlets such as railway stations and sports venues. The firm boosted the range of own brand coffees that it sells, to try to get each customer to spend more in each transaction.

Endless sold the business in 2017 to Samworth Brothers, who already owned the Ginsters pasty brand. At that time there were 33 shops and 19 franchises at motorway service stations. The company states that its pasties are still made in west Cornwall.

In what was described as a temporary measure, all the company's shops closed in March 2020 in response to the COVID-19 pandemic. In the last quarter of that year, Samworth decided to close the shops permanently as they were "unviable". The brand continues to be sold through other retailers at locations including motorway service stations and railway stations.
