= Joyce Laing (art therapist) =

Scottish art therapist (1939–2022)

Joyce Laing OBE
- Born: April 1939; Aberdeen
- Died: 17 July 2022 (aged 83)
- Education: Gray's School of Art
- Occupation: art therapist
- Employer: Barlinnie Prison
- Known for: art therapy with violent prisoners, such as Jimmy Boyle and long term psychiatric patients such as Angus McPhee

Joyce Laing OBE, art therapist (1939 - 2022) was a 'pioneer of art therapy'.

Laing saw a means of releasing creativity in long term psychiatric in-patients such as Angus McPhee (who did not speak for fifty years but created woven grass art), and worked with long-term (including violent) prisoners in the Barlinnie Special Unit, Glasgow, Scotland, such as Jimmy Boyle and Hugh Collins, both in prison for murder, who became sculptors. She was awarded an OBE in 2008 for her work and founded two major Scottish art exhibitions and wrote and edited publications about the evolution of art therapy.

== Education and career ==
Joyce Laing, was born in Aberdeen where she attended Gray's School of Art, studying Fine Art intending a career as an artist. After a friend who fell ill with tuberculosis (TB), became employed working with long term TB patients told her about using painting as a form of therapy. Laing then volunteered at Glen O'Dee TB sanitorium. She observed the relationship and differences between the colour and style of art produced during severe illness and in recovery.

She wrote about the benefits of art in mental health treatment and joined Professor Malcolm Millar at the experimental psychiatric unit at the Ross Clinic, Aberdeen, developing art therapy techniques with schizophrenia and bipolar disorders (then called manic depression). Laing then moved to the Nuffield Clinic, Edinburgh extending her practice to treating alcoholism and worked with 'maladjusted' children.

Her work with the violent prisoners at Barlinnie Special Unit began in 1973, and Laing told BBC Radio Scotland (2007) "If you can channel that energy into positive creation instead of a destructive creation, then you're on to a winner." Her work was admired by emeritus professor of criminal and community justice at the University of Strathclyde, Mike Nellis, who saw her working with prisoners with a history of violence in 2009-10, and said

"I saw how crucial she was to the success of the unit.

"The unit had the most violent men in the Scottish prison system and she started something that no one foresaw - and she handled it.

"That was the genius of Joyce Laing."

Jimmy Boyle's wife, psychotherapist Sara Trevelyan who married him in prison, said "Joyce saw how the work of each individual could express their inner state of being. She knew it was a key to transformation for many of these people."

She discovered, in Craig Dunain psychiatric hospital, Angus McPhee from South Uist, who suffered from schizophrenia and did not speak for fifty years but made 'art' works from natural materials, which he silently saw swept away with the autumn leaves, or quietly burned when clearing the grounds as part of the 'farm ward'. She got his consent to exhibit some of his work and continued to visit him after his release until his death and wrote a book about his work. In 2011/2012 artist Mike Inglis incorporated materials from Angus's work and life in a permanent Public Art wall installation in Inverness and refers to Joyce Laing in "Chasing the Ghost of Angus McPhee" supported by Creative Scotland and University of Edinburgh research grants, presented including a short video of her speaking about him, at the European Outsider Art Conference (2022).

Laing lived in Pittenweem, Fife and founded an art festival there, which included some of the rescued work by Angus McPhee. She also became a consultant and lecturer at the University of Edinburgh School of Art Therapy.

== Exhibitions and events ==
Laing was among those leading the call for a Scottish Centre for Art Extraordinary (also known as Outsider art) which was made a permanent exhibition in 2022 in the Kelvingrove Art Gallery and Museum, but she had started with a touring exhibition, Inner Necessity in 1997. Laing donated her collection of over 1100 works of art by prisoners and psychiatric patients to Glasgow museums in 2012. Some of the material she collected was being discarded as large psychiatric units were closed down and Laing was said to have 'rummaged in bins' to save the patients' work, not generally regarded as 'art' by many at the time, but valued by her as made by untrained artists, but a form of vital self-expression or 'compulsion'. In 2023, the gallery will exhibit 50 years of art work from Barlinnie.

She also co-founded the Pittenweem Arts Festival in 1981 serving on the board until 2007, which built up from old photographs of local lifeboats to annual open house events (art works exhibited in residents' homes) and grew to involve known artists such as Ian Hamilton Finlay, Will Maclean, Oscar Marzaroli, Joan Eardley and John Bellany.

== Publications ==
- The Special Unit, Barlinnie Prison Its Evolution Through Its Art : an Anthology of Essays, Statements, Art Works, Creative Writings and Documentary Photographs (1982)
- Angus McPhee Weaver of Grass

== See also ==
- Art therapy
- Outsider art
- Jimmy Boyle (artist)
- Angus McPhee
