= Angus McPhee =

Scottish artist

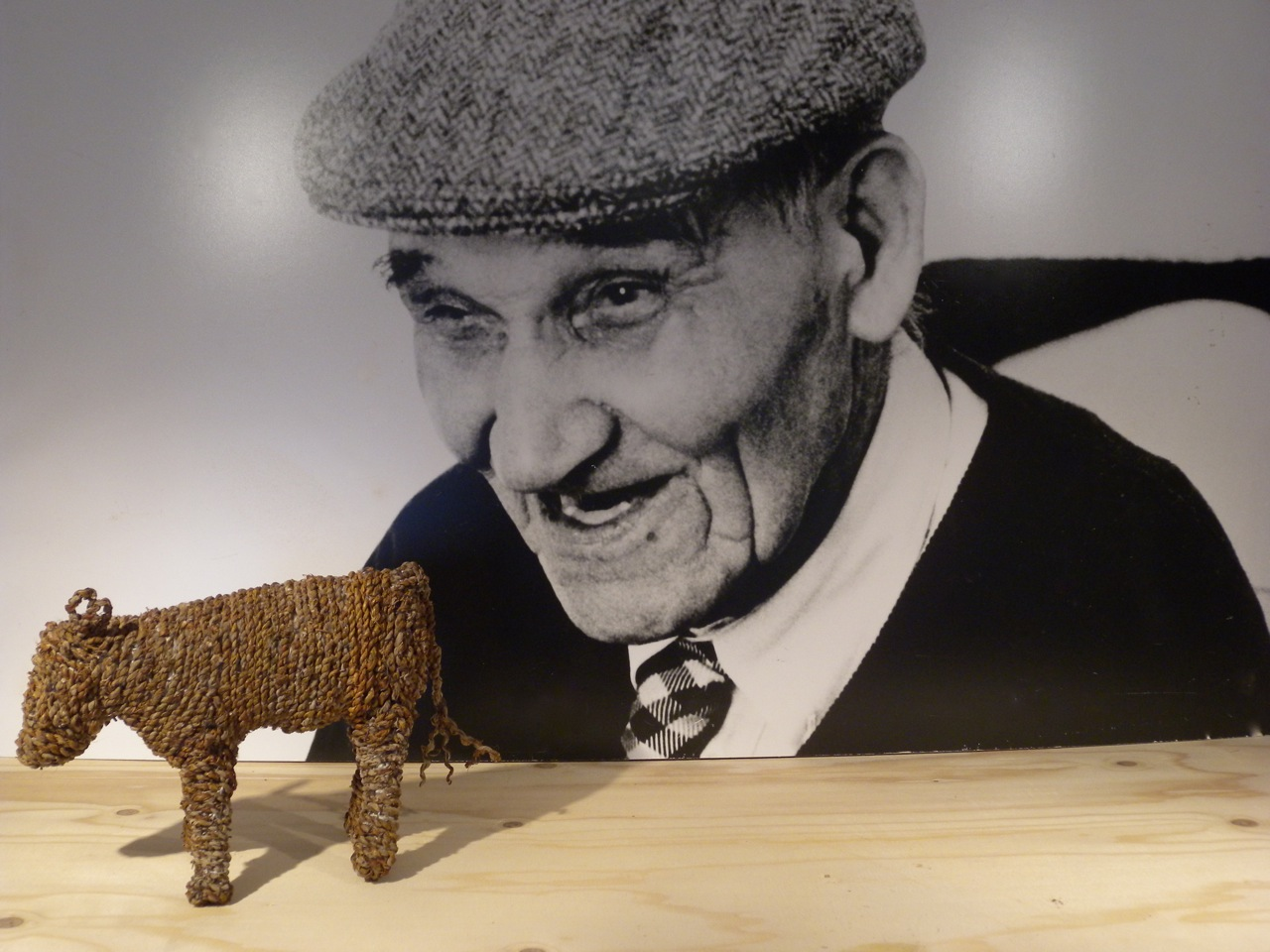
Angus MacPhee at the Art Extraordinary Gallery, Pittenweem, with a woven calf inspired by his work, made by Joanne B Kaar

Angus McPhee or MacPhee (1916–1997) was a Scottish outsider artist, who lived as a young man in the community of Eochar on the island of South Uist, part of the Outer Hebrides. He made his art by weaving found vegetation, such as grasses, into extraordinary garments. He also used sheep's wool picked from barbed wire fences, and leaves. MacPhee created most of his work whilst in the Craig Dunain Hospital near Inverness. He chose not to speak for 50 years.

== Biography ==
MacPhee was born into a crofting family from Eochar/Iochdar, South Uist (Outer Hebrides), although he was actually born in Nettlehole, west of Glasgow, whilst his father worked as a hired hand before returning to Uist to settle when Angus was 7. As a young boy on the croft, he learnt how to make ropes and horse-harness from the abundant marram grass or muirineach on the island. He showed some skills playing music and singing, loved horses, but otherwise appeared to be a normal child of a poor crofting family. Although as a young child he was brought up in a Scots English-speaking community, on the island he soon became a fluent speaker of Gaelic.

MacPhee served with the Lovat Scouts, and rode on horseback to join them at Beaufort Castle, where the horse was sold for £70. Angus was garrisoned in the Faroe Islands during World War II, where he became increasingly mentally ill. No one knew what caused this illness. He returned home on the croft, but he became mute, sullen and self-absorbed. His family noticed his animals became neglected, and soon he was moved to Larbert Asylum. He was diagnosed with schizophrenia in 1946, and spent much of the rest of his life in Craig Dunain Hospital. He fell largely silent and according to Joyce Laing, an art therapist who met MacPhee in the 1970s, he didn't speak for more than 50 years. There is some uncertainty about how totally mute MacPhee actually was, and the first full biography of MacPhee, by Roger Hutchinson shows there was evidence that MacPhee spoke a little to a few close friends in Craig Dunain, in Gaelic. Whatever the case, the fact seems to be that he remained largely silent for 50 years.

Described as 'the quiet big man', he was admitted to the farm ward of the hospital, Kinmylies House. There he tended the animals and worked on the lands. He was a steady and hard worker and had a particular affection for horses. During his free time, MacPhee wandered the hospital grounds in search of materials and created objects woven mostly from grass, sheep wool and beech leaves. He made garments, hats, caps, pouches, harnesses and the like, which he liked to hide under the bushes. He was completely silent as to their purpose.

In the 1990s, as part of the movement to return psychiatric patients to the community, Angus was moved back to South Uist, and lived until his death in the Old People's Nursing Home in Daliburgh within an hours' drive of his remaining family. Joyce Laing recalls visiting him and showing him a photograph of a favourite horse. To her surprise Angus briefly spoke, commenting on the horse. She hoped that he might eventually reveal his story to her but within a short time he died.

== Work and influence ==
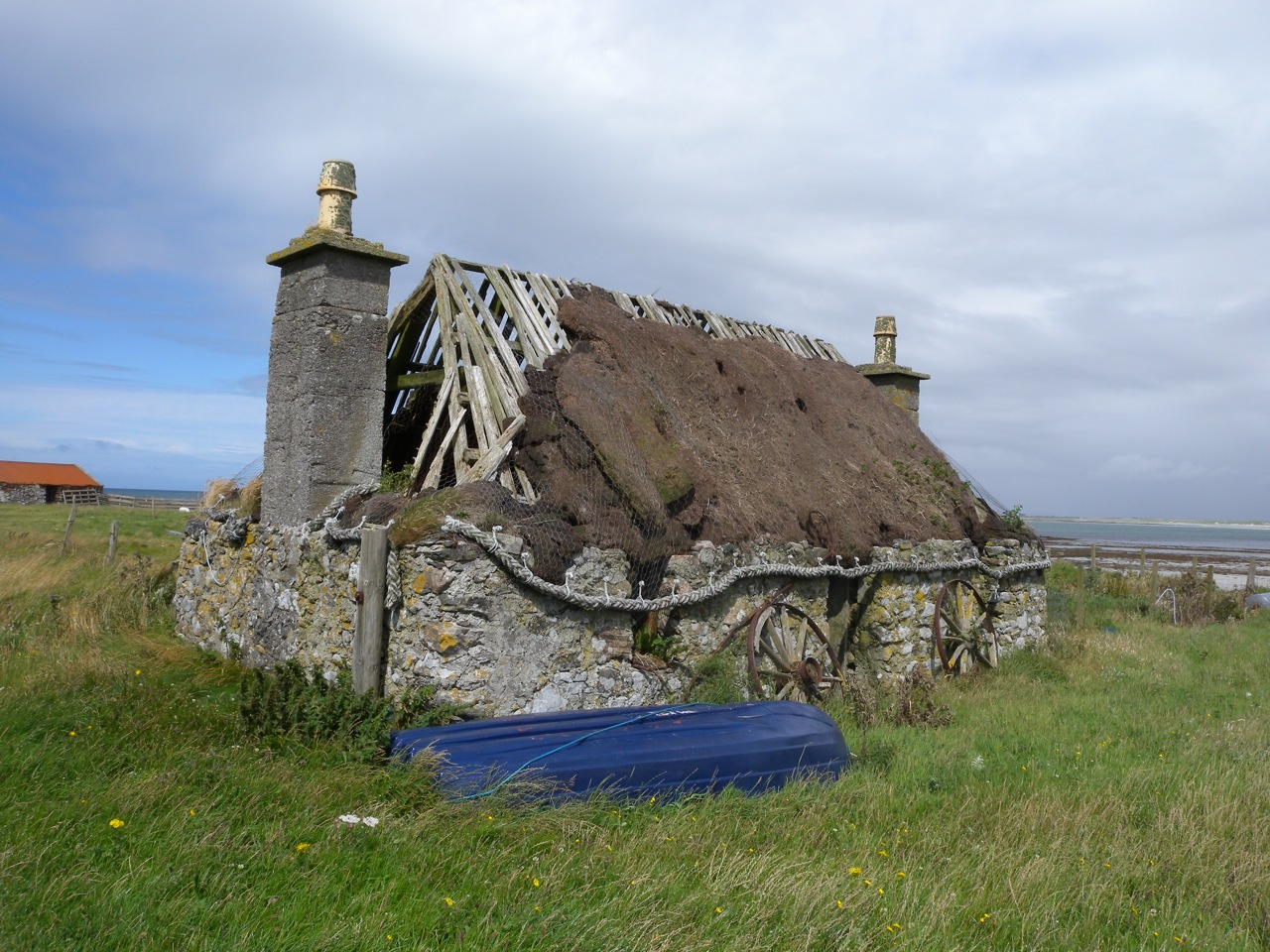
The ruined crofthouse at Iochdar, South Uist, where Angus McPhee was brought up

Whilst an inmate of Craig Dunain he met Joyce Laing, an art therapist. Under the influence of Jean Dubuffet and others, she was searching, with the playwright Tom McGrath, for 'Art Brut' artists. Laing was able to rescue a number of pieces of work by MacPhee which are now in the collection of the Pittenweem 'Art Extraordinary Gallery'. She wrote the book Angus McPhee: Weaver of Grass for an April 2000 exhibition for the Taigh Chearsabhagh Art Trust in Lochmaddy, and she continued to visit MacPhee until his death. He was said to have silently seen his works simply swept up with the autumn leaves whilst a resident in the hospital. In Roger Hutchinson's 'The Silent Weaver' he develops a case for seeing MacPhee's weaving as a way of Angus finding his way back to a kind of health or mental equilibrium by creatively using traditional craft skills and developing them into a unique form of expression.

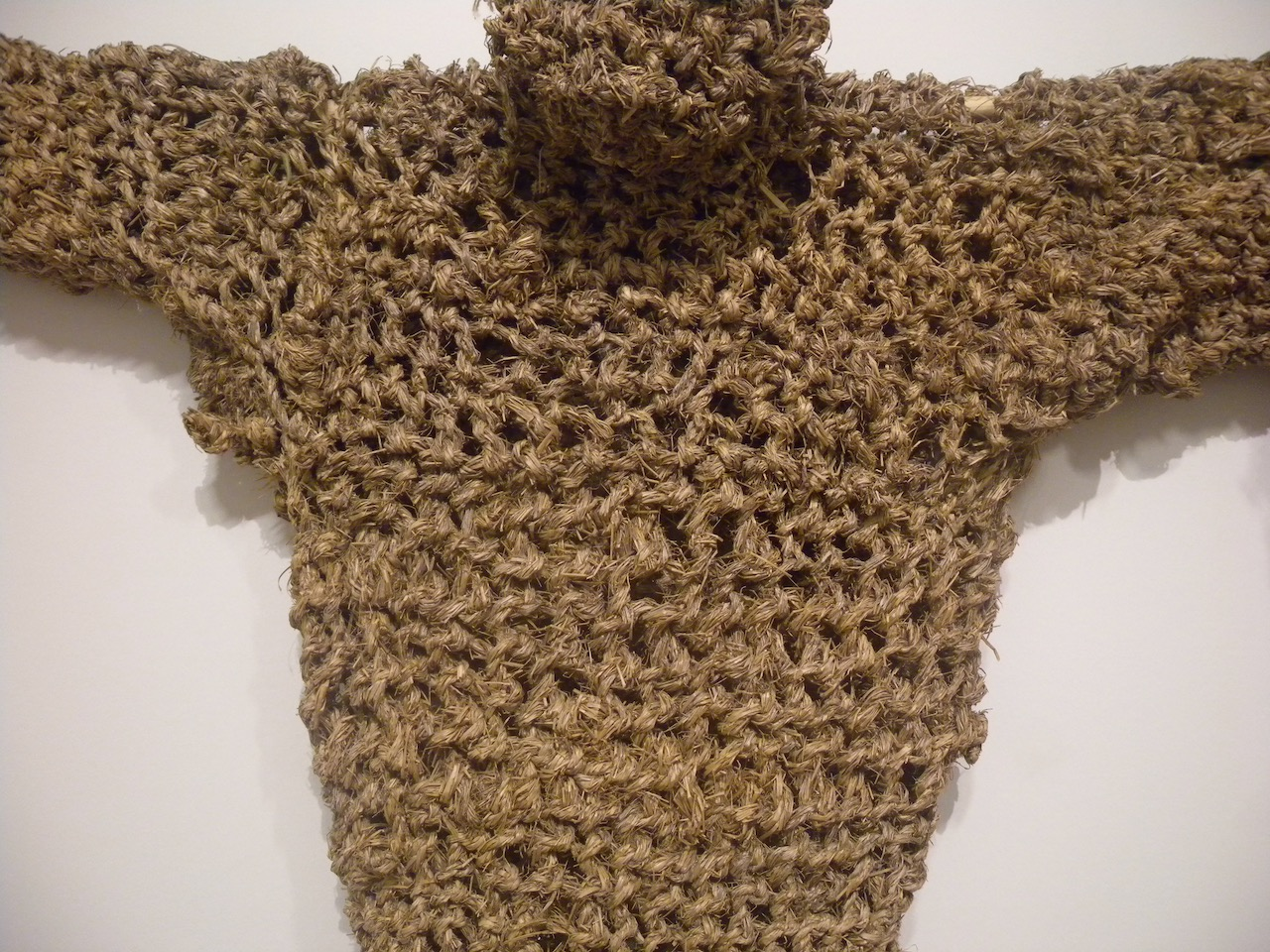
Close up of a woven grass tunic made by Angus McPhee at Craig Dunain Hospital

In 1997 the Mackenzie Sisters included a self-written song 'A'fighe le feur' (Weaver of Grass) on their first album Camhanach, inspired by the unusual story of Angus MacPhee. Sung in Gaelic the English translation of the opening is "Have you ever heard a stranger sound than Angus MacPhee knitting with grass?". In 2004 Donnie Munro (ex-Runrig) included his song 'Weaver of Grass' inspired by the story of Angus MacPhee in his album 'Fields of the Young'.

In 2004, a documentary was made of his life by Nick Higgins: Hidden Gifts: The Mystery of Angus MacPhee (IMDb), which won the 2005 Britspotting award. This includes some home-movie footage of Angus back in Uist, towards the end of his life.

The Silent Weaver by Roger Hutchinson was published in 2011, the fullest and best researched account yet of MacPhee's life and his place as an artist. His story has also been developed as a theatre production, called 'Angus – Weaver of Grass', by Horse and Bamboo Theatre which has toured extensively in the Highlands and Islands during the summers of 2012 and 2013, also appearing in London, Oxford and Lancashire. The Caithness fibre artist, Joanne B Kaar, has worked alongside Horse + Bamboo Theatre on their production, and directly with Joyce Laing. In the process she has rediscovered the techniques used by Angus McPhee and has recreated some of his garments both for the theatre production, for the collection in Pittenweem, and for Scottish Museums.

In 2011/2012 artist Mike Inglis incorporated textures and outfits directly influenced by the stories and artefacts of Angus into his 65-metre permanent Public Art wall installation in Inverness. He is developing a new work entitled "Chasing the Ghost of Angus McPhee" supported by Creative Scotland and University of Edinburgh research grants which further develops themes surrounding Scottish identity and culture as well as his own obsession with Angus, and explains Joyce Laing's involvement, was presented at the European Outsider Art Conference (2022).
