= Leachkin =

Coordinates: 57.47528°N 4.26687°W

Leachkin: Scottish Gaelic: Leacainn
- Location within the Inverness area
- OS grid reference: NH637444
- Council area: Highland
- Country: Scotland
- Sovereign state: United Kingdom
- Post town: Inverness
- Postcode district: IV3 8
- Police: Scotland
- Fire: Scottish
- Ambulance: Scottish

Leachkin (/ˈlɑːrkɪn/; from the Scottish Gaelic: An Leacainn [əɲ ˈʎaːʰkəɲ], "The Broad Hillside") is a suburb on the western outskirts of Inverness, in the Highland council area of Scotland. It is about 3 km west of the city centre, on the hill sloping towards Craig Dunain and Craig Phadrig.

New Craigs Psychiatric Hospital is in Leachkin, it replaced Craig Dunain Hospital and Craig Phadrig Hospital which were nearby. Great Glen House—the headquarters of Scottish Natural Heritage—is also in the area.
