= Bowyers (company) =

British meat manufacturer

- Company type: Private company, Subsidiary
- Industry: Food manufacturing
- Headquarters: Trowbridge, Wiltshire, UK
- Key people: Abraham Bowyer (founder)
- Parent: Lloyds Development Capital

Bowyers was a company known for the manufacture of meat products, including a brand of sausages, which was based in Trowbridge, Wiltshire, England. The company was acquired by Northern Foods in 1985, and passed through two other owners until the Trowbridge factory was closed in 2007. The brand is used by Addo Food Group for ranges of sausage rolls, pork pies and quiches.

== History ==
In 1805, Abraham Bowyer established a grocers shop in Trowbridge. He became known for his meat products, in particular for his sausages, and eventually specialised in meat products. Merged with Wiltshire Bacon in Chippenham and Calne, and Harris in Calne, Bowyers became part of the Marsh Bodiner Group. This allowed a capital injection which resulted in the company's move into Innox Mill, Trowbridge in 1954.

Acquired by Northern Foods in 1985, it was merged in 1990 with Palethorpes of Market Drayton into new company Pork Farms Bowyers. In 2001, the Bowyers and Palethorpes pork sausage business and brands were sold to Kerry Group, to allow the company to concentrate on baked meat products.

The company was bought by private equity firm Vision Capital in 2007, as part of a £160 million divestment by Northern Foods. With European Union legislation requiring Melton Mowbray pork pies to be produced within a defined distance of Melton Mowbray, the company chose to close the Trowbridge plant with the loss of 400 jobs, and invest £12 million into the Nottingham plant to increase Melton Mowbray pie production. Some employees were subsequently offered jobs in the Pork Farms plant at Shaftesbury.

In 2015, Vision Capital combined Bowyers with other chilled savoury pastry brands under Addo Food Group. In 2017, Addo was sold to Lloyds Development Capital, another private equity firm.

== Sites ==
The site at Innox Mill, Trowbridge was bought by the Morrisons supermarket chain and cleared for redevelopment, except for the Grade II listed three-storey factory building of c. 1875. However, the site was sold again in 2016.

There was also a Bowyers factory on Alexandra Road, Mutley, Plymouth. The site had a large chimney with the name Bowyer running down it. The factory was formerly the Bedford Brewery premises which became the Beechwood factory in 1921, producing Devonshire bacons and hams. In 1959, it came under Unigate Dairies ownership when they took over Cow & Gate. The plant was sold to Bowyer's, who opened a new factory on the Newnham Industrial Estate in 1979 and the old factory was demolished; the chimney was taken down in May 1980.
