= Samworth Brothers =

British food manufacturer

- Company type: Limited company
- Industry: Food
- Founded: 1896
- Headquarters: Melton Mowbray, Leicestershire and Callington, Cornwall, United Kingdom
- Key people: Life President: Sir David Samworth CBE DL; (deceased 2022); Group Holdings Board: Nicholas Linney (Chair); Hugo Mahoney (Group Chief Executive); Mark Samworth (Director); William Kendall (Non-Executive Director); Hannu Ryöppönen (Non-Executive Director); Jonathan Warburton (Non-Executive Director); Group Executive Board: Steve Bailey (Group Finance Director); Paul Davey (Director); Simon Wookey (Director); Mary-Ann Kilby (Director); Richard Marris (Director)
- Products: Meat products, Melton Mowbray pork pies, Sandwiches, Meals
- Owner: Private, various
- Number of employees: 2,000+
- Subsidiaries: Ginsters, Walker & Son, Dickinson & Morris, Soreen and SCI-MX Nutrition

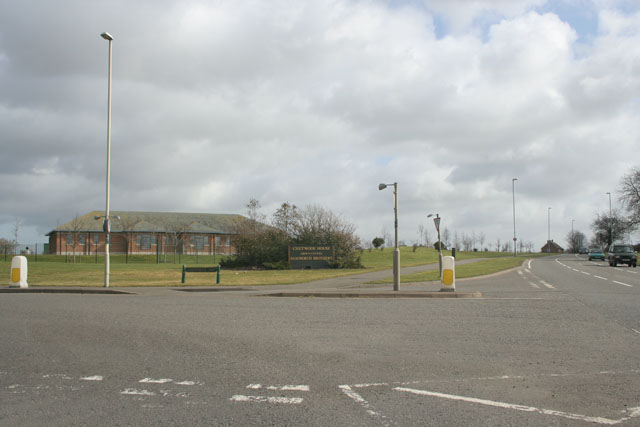
Samworth Brothers' head office fronts two food manufacturing plants on the A607

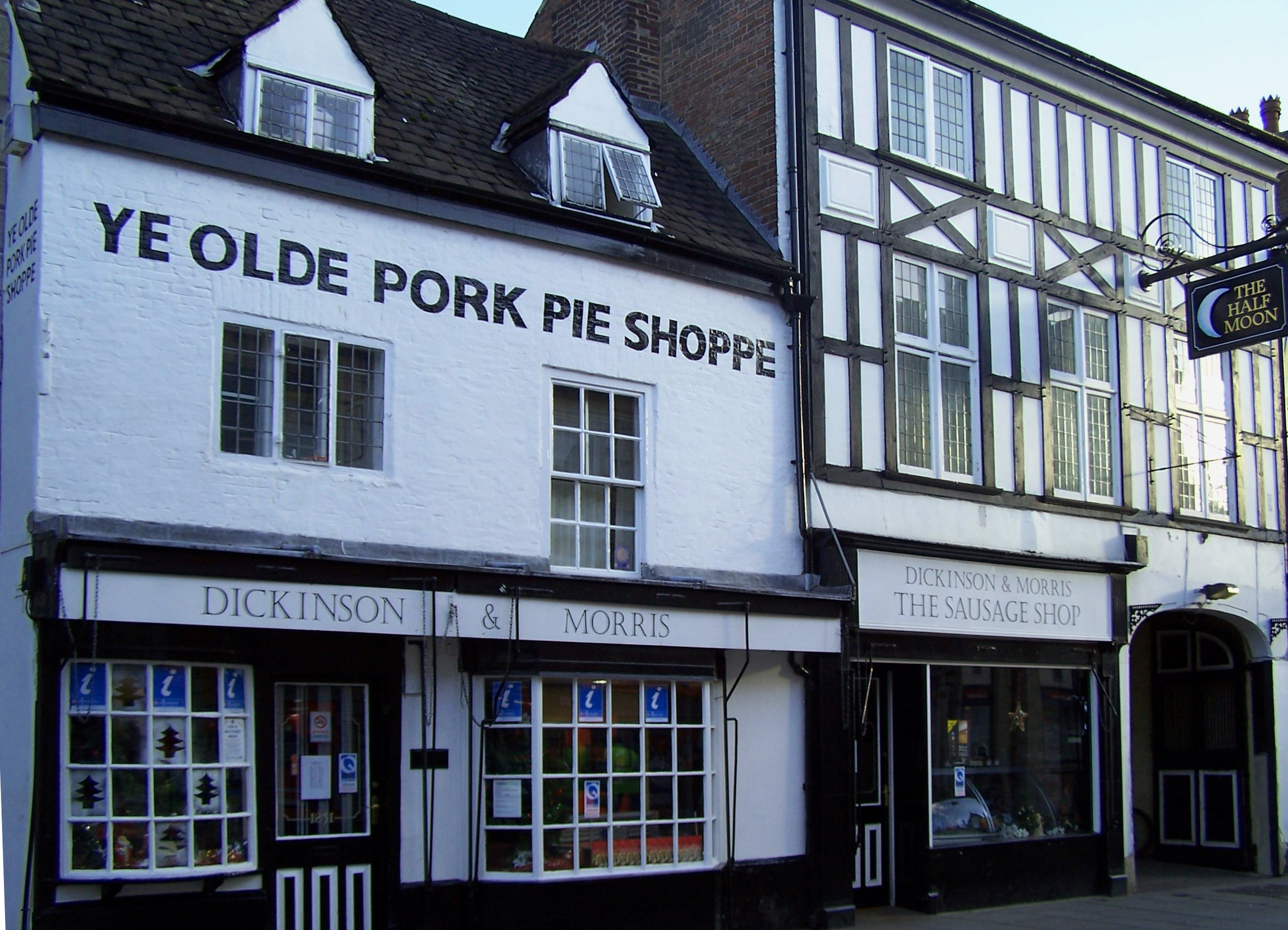
Dickinson and Morris pie shop, Melton Mowbray

Samworth Brothers is a British food manufacturer which produces a range of chilled and ambient foods, both own-label and branded. It is the owner of Cornish pasty maker Ginsters and malt loaf manufacturer Soreen, and is also known as a maker of certified Melton Mowbray pork pies.

== History ==
George Samworth was born in 1868, and after joining a group of Birmingham-based pig buyers started his own pig-dealing business in 1896. After his retirement in 1930, his sons Frank and George took over the business. In 1950, Frank bought Nottingham based butchery and pie makers TN Parr, followed in 1969 by the acquisition of local Nottinghamshire rival Pork Farms which doubled the size of the business overnight. Frank decided to retire, leaving the business to his sons, with David as chairman, while Frank Jr. and John Samworth were senior Directors. In 1971, the group was floated on the London Stock Exchange as Pork Farms plc, and in 1972 bought rival Holland's Pies. In 1978, Pork Farms was acquired by Northern Foods.

Separately, in 1977, John Samworth had left the business after his purchase of the Ginsters Cornish pasties business from the Ginsters family, under his holding company Goran Foods Ltd. In 1985 the name of Goran Foods was changed to Samworth Brothers, to reflect the involvement of John and David Samworth.

In 1986, Samworth Brothers purchased Leicester-based Walker & Son Ltd. Having sold their Walkers crisps business in 1971 to US-based Standard Brands, their pie-making business was now the largest distributor of Melton Mowbray pork pies. This business was added to in 1992 after the purchase of the fire-destroyed Melton Mowbray based pie maker Dickinson & Morris, which was refurbished in a traditional style.

In 2014, the Group bought the malt loaf brand, Soreen, and in 2015, the sports nutrition brand, SCI-MX.

In 2017, Samworth Brothers bought the West Cornwall Pasty Company, a chain of fast food outlets which at that time had 33 shops and 19 outlets at motorway service stations.

In June 2024, Samworth Brothers Manton Wood voluntarily recalled 15 sandwich and wrap products containing vegetable leaf following an outbreak of Shigatoxigenic E. coli in the United Kingdom in major supermarket chains. The recalls were done as a precautionary step, as no testing has yet indicated traces of E. coli in tested products.

== Present ==
The business is chaired by non-family member Nick Linney.

=== Products ===
Samworth Brothers manufactures the following product lines:

Food to go: including sandwiches, wraps, salads, pasties and mini malt loaves.

Savoury pastry: including Ginsters and the West Cornwall Pasty Company, as well as pork pie brands Dickinson & Morris and Walker & Son. The Group is a member of the Cornish Pasty Association and the Melton Mowbray Pork Pie Association.

Meals: a range of 'heat and serve' meals for major UK retailers and branded suppliers.

Sausages and cooked meats: Walker Sausage Company and Walkers Deli make a range of premium sausages, hams and pates.

Sports nutrition: SCI-MX makes a range of high protein powders, capsules, snack bars and shakes.

=== Services ===
Samworth Brothers Supply Chain provides temperature controlled distribution services to companies within the Samworth Brothers Group, as well as to external food manufacturers, retailers and other distributors.

Westward Laboratories is a food testing lab in Cornwall which provides microbiological and chemical testing for the food industry.

=== Community ===
Since 2007, the company has run the Charity Challenge, a fundraising triathlon-style event that takes place every two years.

In 2013, the Group launched the Samworth Brothers Sports Opportunity Fund which supports community sports projects close to Samworth Brothers locations. Between 2013 and 2019, it gave £1.9 million to 160 sports projects.

=== Sustainability ===
Since 2017, Samworth Brothers has bought all its grid-supplied electricity from certified renewable sources. In an effort to tackle food waste, the Group is a signatory to the IGD/WRAP Food Waste Reduction Roadmap and to the Champions 12.3 pledge – an international food-waste-reduction initiative.

Samworth Brothers also has group-wide initiatives in place aimed at reducing impact, reusing resources, recycling materials and adopting recovery principles.

== National Living Wage debate ==
At the time of introduction of a National Living Wage in April 2016, Samworth Brothers came under widespread criticism for removing premium pay rates in order to pay the new minimum wage. Joan Ryan, Labour Party MP for Enfield North, stated in Parliament:

Bradgate Bakery is part of the group [Samworth Brothers] that owns famous brands that we all enjoy, such as Ginsters pies and Soreen loaf, but the pay that it is offering staff is a lot less tasty than its food. Bradgate has written to all its Leicestershire staff, detailing changes to their wages. Most shop-floor employees at Bradgate were earning just over £6.70 an hour before 1 April, so the introduction of the national living wage should have made quite a difference for them, but Bradgate, like B&Q, has found an opportunity to save money.

[Bradgate] has changed staff terms and conditions to phase out double pay for Sundays by 2019. That means that while employees on the national minimum wage earned £13.78 per hour on a Sunday last month, by 2019 they will earn just £9 per hour. That is the national living wage according to Bradgate Bakery. Extra pay for night shifts, Saturdays and overtime are also being scaled back. In sum, Bradgate workers are being sold a lie: they are told that their pay is increasing, but what the Government are giving with one hand, Bradgate is taking with another. According to one very worried worker who approached my hon. Friend the Member for Mitcham and Morden, these cuts will affect the whole range of shifts that run in the factories. That means that by 2018 a production operative on night shift will be paid £2,778 less a year, while a night shift team leader will be paid £344 less.

== Politics ==
Mark and David Samworth, who died in 2022, were regular donors to the Conservative Party. It was reported in 2015 that donations since 2002 by the Samworths, and others connected with the company, totalled nearly £650,000.

Mark Samworth was invited to one of the Conservative Party's "leaders' group meals" in 2016, according to documents released by the party and analysed by the Morning Star. These "cash-for-access" meals require a minimum payment of £50,000 to the Conservative Party.
