= Nicholas Horsley =

British businessman

George Nicholas Seward Horsley (21 April 1934 – 18 January 2004) was a British businessman, and chairman of Northern Foods. He was born in North Ferriby, East Riding of Yorkshire, England.

== Personal life & family ==
Nicholas Horsley was born to a wealthy business family in Yorkshire, the second of the five children (three sons, two daughters) of Susan Howitt and Alec Horsley, the founder of Northern Foods. He attended Keswick grammar school, Bootham school, York, and Worcester College, Oxford, where he graduated with a third-class degree. Though his father (a Quaker) preferred conscientious objection, Nicholas did national service in Germany without being commissioned.

A passionate Yorkshireman, womaniser, tennis player and gambler, Nicholas was married three times. Firstly to Valerie Edwards (a Welsh typist); they had three children, with whom Nicholas became estranged, named Ashley Horsley, Sebastian Horsley and Jason Horsley. After their divorce Horsley married Sabitha Sarkar in 1975 (divorcing 1987) and Alwyne Law in 1998. His first wife did not remarry, and maintains he was the "love of her life" (though she later became known as Valerie Walmsley-Hunter).

== Career ==
Initially attempting a career as a freelance journalist, Nicholas began work for Northern Foods (then Northern Dairies) in 1958 as trainee manager. In 1963 he became a director. He was chairman of the Dairy Trade Federation from 1975–1977 and 1980–1985, and chairman of the BBC consultative group on industrial and business relations from 1980–1983. He also chaired the Yorkshire and Humber Regional Economic Board.

== Later life and death ==
In the early 1970s Nicholas began to suffer from a "rare genetic disease" which eventually restricted him to a wheelchair due to the wasting of his thigh muscles (his sister Gilda is also a sufferer). He retired from Northern Foods and moved to the West Indies, where he held a number of posts, including deputy chairman of BICO, and director of the Pine Hill dairy. He struggled with depression and alcoholism for the remainder of his life, and died from heart failure on 18 January 2004.
