= Iochdar =

Coordinates: 57.393°N 7.365°W

Iochdar: Scottish Gaelic: An t-Ìochdair
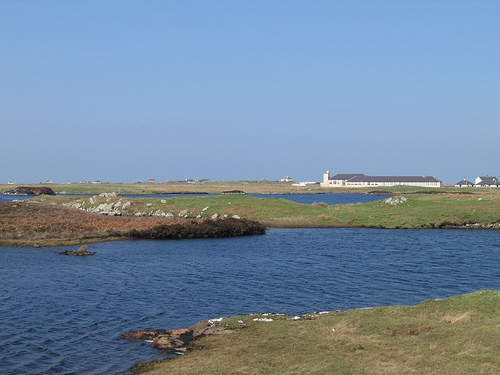
- Loch an Oig looking over Iochdar School

- Location within the Outer Hebrides
- Language: Scottish Gaelic; English
- OS grid reference: NF777463
- Civil parish: South Uist
- Council area: Na h-Eileanan Siar
- Country: Scotland
- Sovereign state: United Kingdom
- Post town: ISLE OF SOUTH UIST
- Postcode district: HS8
- Dialling code: 01870
- Police: Scotland
- Fire: Scottish
- Ambulance: Scottish
- UK Parliament: Na h-Eileanan an Iar
- Scottish Parliament: Na h-Eileanan an Iar

Iochdar (Scottish Gaelic: An t-Ìochdair), also spelled Eochar, is a hamlet and community on the west coast of the island of South Uist, in the Outer Hebrides, Scotland. Iochdar is also in the parish of South Uist. It is the largest of several crofting settlements in the north-west of South Uist, and is located 1.5 kilometres (0.93 mi) west of the A865 road. Iochdar is part of the 93,000 acres (38,000 ha) South Uist Estate, which was the subject of Scotland's largest community land buyout in 2006, and is now run by Stòras Uibhist. Iochdar was where Angus McPhee or MacPhee (1916–1997), the Scottish Outsider Artist, was raised. He is buried in the local cemetery.

== Iochdar School ==
Iochdar School, built in 1963, is a primary school (years 1–7) that caters to students from the hamlet as well as surrounding communities. The school has 75 pupils and five teachers. The school has won a number of awards, including the Homecoming Scotland Award at the Scottish Education Awards 2009.

== Sgoil an Ìochdair agus a' Choimhearsnachd ==
Sgoil an Ìochdair agus a' Choimhearsnachd (Eochar School and Community) was formed in December 1998 in response to a lack of outdoor facilities at Iochdar School. It is a community group whose aim is to support recreation and sport in the catchment area of the school, which extends 14 miles (23 km) along the island chain, from Peninerine in South Uist, to Island Flodda in Benbecula.

The group's core aims are to upgrade outdoor facilities in Iochdar. After a community survey and a feasibility study, the group has completed a number of small projects, including a makeover of the playground and playing fields at the school. Sgoil an Iochdair agus a' Choimhearsnachd includes both individuals and community groups, and is run by a board of up to seven trustees, of which three represent community groups, three are elected from the local community, and one of which can be co-opted.

== Iochdar Hall ==
Iochdar Hall (Scottish Gaelic: Talla An Ìochdair) is a community hall, used for dances and sales. There is an annual cattle show at the hall.

== Iochdar Saints ==
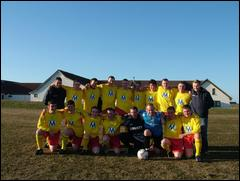
Iochdar Saints Football Team

Iochdar Saints are an amateur football club, who play in the Uist and Barra League. The club is managed by Stephen MacAulay. The club are currently champions of the Uist & Barra league for a fourth time in a row. Iochdar Saints have also won the Westford Challenge, the MacPherson Memorial Shield, Summer Cup, Billy McNeil Cup and the Indoor Tournament Cup.

== Attractions ==
The main attraction in Iochdar is Hebridean Jewellery. They sell a wide range of jewellery, mainly being of Celtic designs. The jeweler is John Hart. The jewelers also includes a cafe. Other attractions are Lovats Shop & Carnan Stores which sell a wide range of homeware and outdoor facilities.
