= Soreen =

Food brand in the United Kingdom

Soreen is a brand of malt loaf and is owned by Mark and David Samworth, a food manufacturing company based in Leicestershire.

The creator of Soreen, John Rahbek Sorensen, arrived in England in 1920. He purchased a property in Manchester two years before establishing John Sorensen Bakery Equipment & Co. Over the course of the next several years, he produced and sold his own baked goods.

In 2013, the company's revenue grew 20% to £30M, and in 2014 the Soreen brand was acquired from the McCambridge Group by the Samworth Brothers for an undisclosed sum. As of December 2018, the company employs 126 at its Manchester factory, and its products are consumed by roughly 28.5% of households in the UK. They distribute 1.5 million loaves per week. In recent years the company has developed additional flavours of loaf including banana, strawberry, salted caramel and others.
