= Evlynn Smith =

Scottish artist, designer and furniture maker (1962–2003)

- Born: Evelynn Ann Smith; 8 September 1962; Edinburgh, Scotland
- Died: 18 April 2003 (aged 40); London, England
- Occupations: Artist, Interior Designer, Furniture Maker
- Spouse: Sebastian Horsley (m. 1983–1990)

Evlynn Smith (born Evelynn Anne Smith; 8 September 1962 – 18 April 2003) was a Scottish artist, designer and furniture maker. She was married to the artist Sebastian Horsley from 1983 to 1990, ran various art therapy groups in Scotland during the 1980s (some with Jimmy Boyle), and set up the design company Precious McBane with Meriel Scott in 1993.

== Career and personal life ==
Smith was born in Edinburgh, Scotland. Her father was a painter and decorator and her mother was a secretary, She was raised in a basement flat in Stockbridge with four sisters, and attended Stockbridge primary school and Broughton High School. Although her attendance at secondary school was sporadic and her mother often quipped that she was in school more regularly than Evlynn. In 1981 she met Sebastian Horsley, and they were married two years later on the island of Iona.

In 1983 she completed a foundation degree at the Chelsea College of Arts and was offered the chance to study sculpture at Central Saint Martins. She accepted the place, but deferred her entry in order to co-direct the Gateway Exchange project in Edinburgh, with reformed gangster Jimmy Boyle and his wife; a charitable organisation designed to rehabilitate drug addicts and ex-convicts through art therapy. In 1987 she co-founded the Fighting Back workshops, which used art therapy to raise awareness of and reduce suffering for victims of HIV and AIDS.

In 1990 she moved to London and attended Central Saint Martins, also divorcing from Sebastian Horsley (reportedly after both she and he had engaged in long-term affairs with Jimmy Boyle).

In 1993, together with Meriel Scott, Smith founded and ran the art and furniture-design company Precious McBane.

== Death ==
On 18 April 2003 Smith suffered a brain aneurysm and died at her London home. She was 40 years of age.
