= New Craigs Psychiatric Hospital =

- NHS Highland
- Shown in Inverness

Geography
- Location: Leachkin, Inverness, Scotland
- Coordinates: 57°28′12″N 4°16′5″W

Organisation
- Care system: NHS Scotland
- Type: Specialist

Services
- Beds: 234
- Speciality: Psychiatric Hospital

History
- Founded: 2000

Links
- Other links: List of hospitals in Scotland

New Craigs Psychiatric Hospital is a hospital situated in Leachkin, on the western outskirts of Inverness, Scotland. It is managed by NHS Highland.

== History ==
The facility is a 234-bed healthcare campus that provides mental health and learning disability accommodation. New Craigs, which replaced Craig Dunain Hospital and Craig Phadrig Hospital both of which were both located nearby, opened in July 2000.

The hospital was the first psychiatric facility to be funded under a private finance initiative scheme in Scotland. It was built and managed by Robertson Group, with NHS Highland repaying for the cost over a 25-year contract. Under the PFI arrangement the facility cost £16.5 million to build but the total cost that NHS Highland is expected to bear is estimated at £106 million.
