= Julekake =

Norwegian Christmas cake

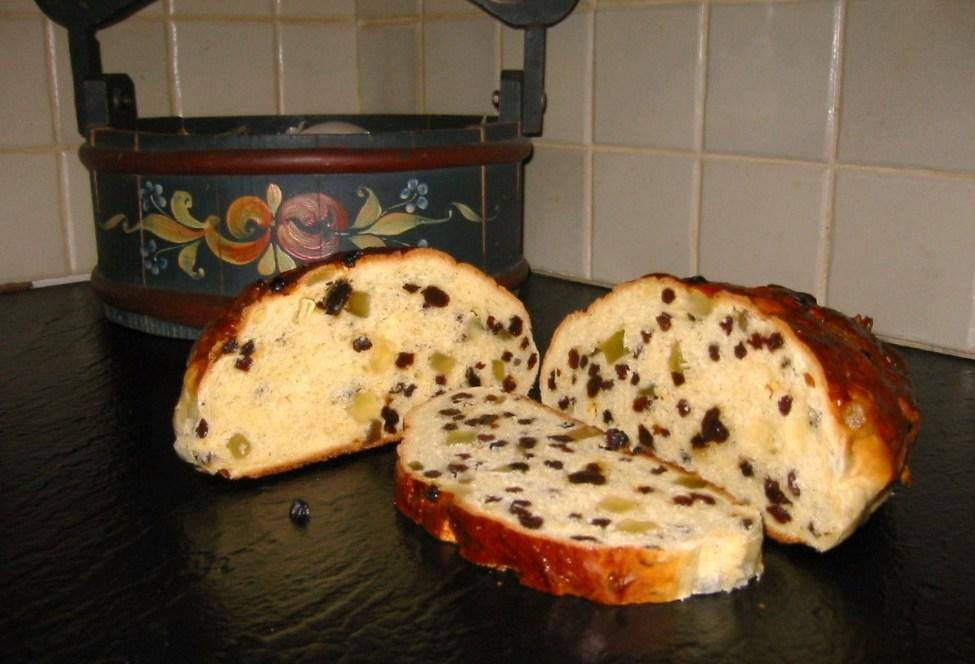
Julekake with raisins and succade

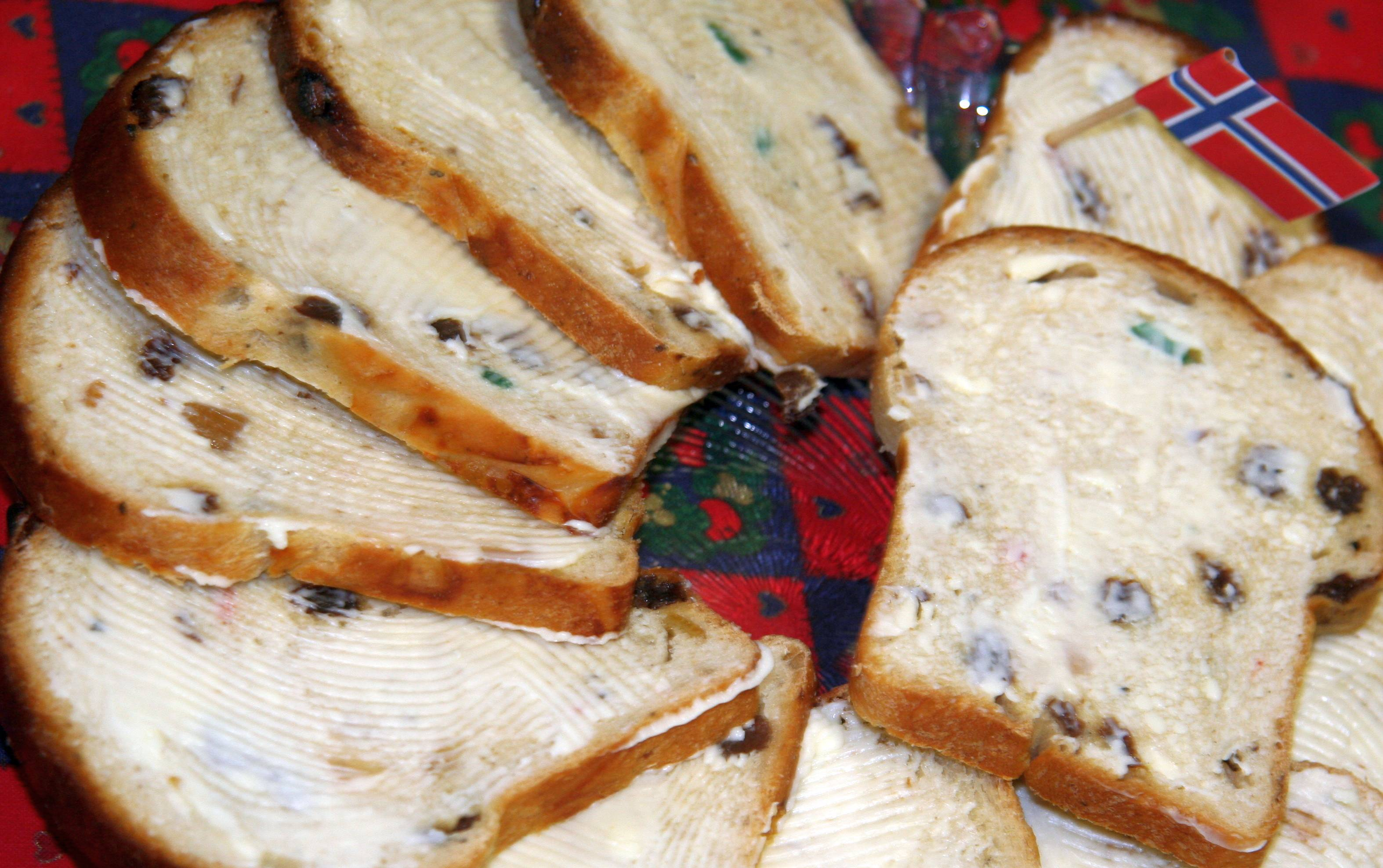
Julekake as Christmas bread (julebrød), a traditional Christmas food in Norway.

Julekake is a Norwegian Christmas cake. It is a yeast cake made with butter and sugar, spiced with cardamom, and containing candied fruits, raisins, and almonds. It is also sometimes called a "Christmas bread" instead of a cake. It can be eaten warm, or toasted and served with butter.

== Preparation ==
The cake is made by mixing sugar with tepid scalded milk, salt, and cardamom then adding the yeast to the mixture, followed by the oats, butter, and egg. After the flour is folded in with the dried and candied fruits, the bread is kneaded and brushed with butter, then set aside to rise. There are two rises.

== See also ==
- Fruitcake
- Limpa bread
- Stollen
