= Limpa =

Scandinavian rye bread flavored with caraway and orange peel

Wort bread
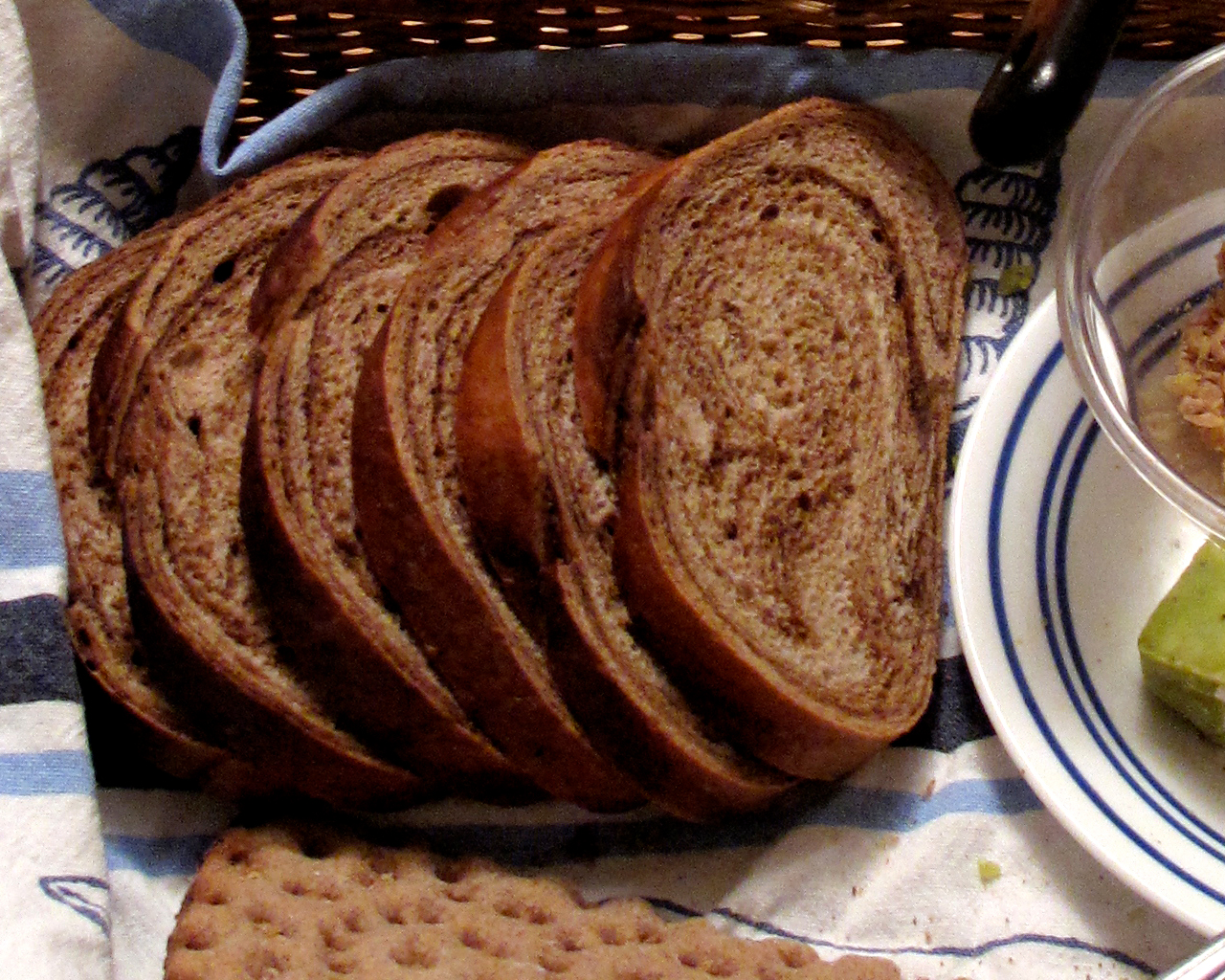
- Vörtbröd in a basket.
- Alternative names: Vörtlimpa, vörtbröd
- Type: Bread
- Place of origin: Sweden
- Region or state: Scandinavia
- Main ingredients: Rye flour, molasses, butter, brown sugar, yeast, wort
- Variations: Caraway, fennel, anise, orange peel, beer, raisins, prunes

Wort bread (Swedish “Vörtbröd") is a sweet Scandinavian rye bread, associated with Swedish cuisine. It is a yeast-leavened spice loaf, sweetened with brown sugar and molasses which comes in a large variety in regard to whether or not butter-enriched, and if spices are being used. Traditional bread spices are anise, caraway, fennel seeds, and bitter orange.

Usually baked during the Christmas season, the festive wort breads/loaves (Swedish: vörtbröd / vörtlimpa) are flavoured with spices like anise, caraway, and fennel seeds, and often orange rinds, raisins or sultanas, and dark beer, in addition to the wort. Its distinct taste and look is in large part due to the addition of wort to the dough, making it similar to a malt loaf. It is a typical dish for a traditional Christmas Eve smörgåsbord or julbord. Limpa bread pairs well with jams and jellies, or cream cheese.

== Preparation ==
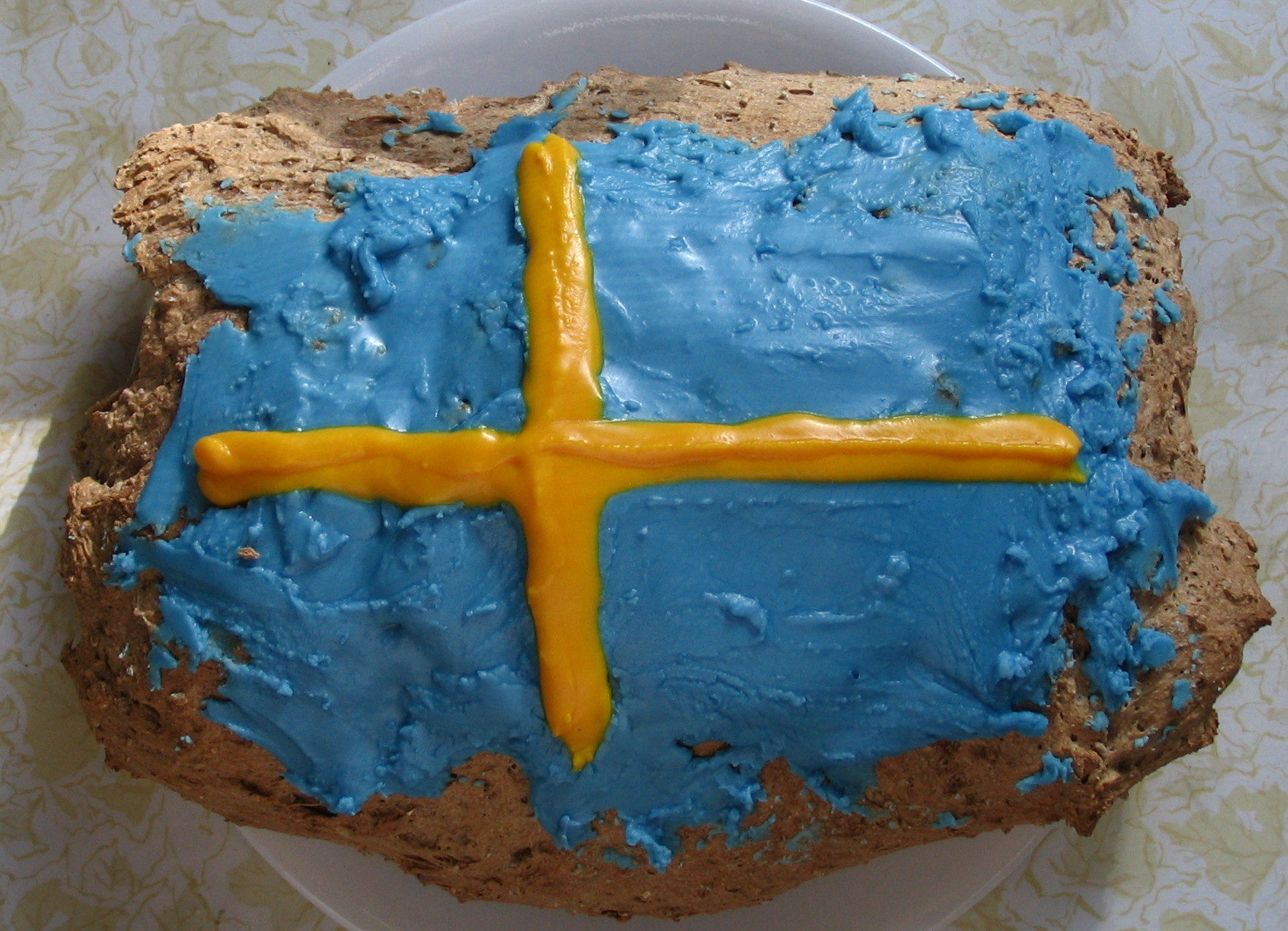
Wort bread frosted in the colors of the Swedish flag for National Day of Sweden 2007

The first step for making the bread is to bring molasses, brown sugar, caraway seeds, wort, and water to a gentle boil, then to add shortening or butter and citrus rind. Once this mixture has cooled to a tepid temperature, it is combined with activated yeast and rye flour. The dough rises and more flour is added to knead the dough in preparation for a second rise, then the tops are brushed with melted butter and the loaves are baked. Some recipes add the molasses mixture to the dry ingredients after the rye flour has been scalded with hot water.

== Ingredients ==
This bread was historically leavened with fermented brewer's wort, hence its Swedish name vörtlimpa or vörtbröd ("wort loaf" or "wort bread"). Modern recipes sometimes still use stout beer as an ingredient.

The recipes vary, some replacing caraway with cardamom, or leaving out the orange peel. In the United States, its most common form is an aromatic orange and spice loaf.

Molasses adds color to the brown bread, made with a blend of rye and other flours. Other flours blended in with the rye, depending on the recipe, can include cornmeal, whole wheat flour or all purpose flour. To add the orange flavor, orange oil or orange zest can be used. Although not strictly traditional in the origin area of northern Sweden, some variations on the basic recipe may add raisins or prunes. This is however traditional in southern Sweden where wort bread was adopted later.

== See also ==
- Julekake
- List of breads
- List of Christmas dishes
