= Northern Foods =

Food company based in Britain

Northern Foods Ltd.
- Type: Private
- Industry: Food
- Founded: 1937 as Northern Dairies
- Headquarters: Wakefield, England
- Key people: Ranjit Singh Boparan
- Revenue: £975.2 million (2009)
- Operating income: £52.7 million (2009)
- Net income: £2.5 million (2009)
- Number of employees: 9,890 (2009)
- Parent: Boparan Holdings
- Subsidiaries: Gunstones bakery, Solway Foods, Fox's Biscuits, Green Isle Foods, Hollands Pies, Pennine Foods, Matthew Walker

Northern Foods is a British food manufacturer headquartered in Wakefield, England. It was formerly listed on the London Stock Exchange and was a constituent of the original FTSE 100 Index. The company is credited, together with Marks & Spencer, with creating the UK Chilled Food category. The driver of this growth was Christopher Haskins, the son-in-law of the company's founder Alec Horsley. Haskins became a director in 1967, deputy chairman in 1974, and was chairman from 1980 to 2002. The company was delisted in 2011 when it was bought by the 2 Sisters company.

== History ==
=== 20th century ===
The business was founded by Alec Horsley in 1937 as a family-run dairy business based in Holme on Spalding Moor. During the war years, Horsley bought up many competing local dairies to become a major dairy force in the Humber region. In 1942, the business was registered as Northern Dairies and became a public company in 1956. In 1958, Alec's son Nicholas Horsley joined the then Northern Dairies as a trainee manager, becoming a director in 1963. His first business success was to acquire cheaply, a stake in a small ice-cream company called Mr Whippy, which he sold on to Charles Forte for a high price two years later.

The dairy was generating large amounts of cash, as many dairies were at the time, due to the government backed guaranteed pricing created by the Milk Marketing Board, itself a legacy of post-war food shortages. That cash was used to fund diversification into foods. In 1972, Northern Dairies changed its name to Northern Foods. Nick Horsley's brother-in-law, Christopher Haskins found himself on a plane next to Marks & Spencer (M&S) executive who was setting up a new store in Belfast. M&S began buying milk for the store from Northern Foods, followed by yoghurt deliveries and food, including the first fresh trifle for M&S. The contract developed into food sales to M&S that were eventually worth over half a billion pounds a year. Northern Foods also made some non-competing products for other retailers. Since then its strategy has been to buy up and consolidate M&S suppliers.

In 1986, Northern Foods built Fenlands Food Factory in Grantham, for £8 million, dedicated entirely to M&S. At the time it was regarded as the most advanced food factory in Europe.

Nick Horsley had successfully diversified the business, widening Northern Foods' portfolio into Marks & Spencer cakes (through Park Cakes), Smith's Flour Milling, brewing (with the purchase of Hull Brewery), Fox's Biscuits, Pork Farms and many other smaller firms. It was during this period that the company pioneered the market in chilled, prepared meals and sandwiches in supermarkets.

Nicholas Horsley took early retirement due to a rare genetic wasting disease, and by 1986, Haskins had become chairman of Northern Foods. In November 1991, the company acquired Express Dairies from Grand Metropolitan.

In 1994, the Milk Marketing Board was abolished and milk prices in supermarkets fell. The loss of the high return on milk made a measurable impact on all dairy companies including Northern Foods. Northern Foods demerged Express Dairies in 1998 as the depressed margins were dragging the share price down of the overall group. Both businesses were listed to the FTSE 250. Express Dairies was later bought by in a staged acquisition, finalised in 2003, by Arla Amba a Danish and Swedish co-operative.

=== 21st century ===
Christopher Haskins stepped down as CEO in 2002 with Jo Stewart succeeding him. In March 2004, Patricia O'Driscol, who had previously worked for Tesco’s chilled business and Shell, was hired to replace Stewart.

In July 2004, M&S was subject to a takeover bid from Philip Green. This was rejected by M&S which, partly as a result of shareholder pressure, decided to be more transactional in its supplier relationships and started to take volume out of the Northern Foods factories to diversify its supply base. Four profit warnings followed.

In 2005, O'Driscoll embarked on a radical restructuring programme. In February 2006, she hired Stefan Barden, formerly CEO of Heinz UK&I, to support the restructuring as CEO designate. They completed the restructuring that year selling the dedicated chilled distribution (NFT), flour milling (Smiths), cakes (Park Cakes), speciality bread (Fletchers) and chilled pastry businesses (Pork Farms Bowyers) were also sold to a private equity group, Vision Capital. Lastly, the Green Isle Boyle site and its Trafford Park Bakery were also closed with production either consolidated into other factories within its footprint or moved to other manufacturers such as Ginsters. The restructuring complete, O’Driscoll stepped down and Barden took over as CEO in 2007. The next 16 quarters saw sales growth and margin expansion during a period of continued supply over capacity, volatile commodity prices and significant customer pricing pressure.

Whereas trading was now performing well, a major issue for Northern Foods’ had become its large pension scheme, which since the 2008 financial crisis, had moved from being in surplus to having a sizeable £150m deficit. A merger of equals with Greencore was proposed to help address this, but the pension fund preferred the protections given in an alternative offer by 2 Sisters PLC; which successfully consummated the acquisition in May 2011.

On 13 May 2011, the company was delisted from the London Stock Exchange. The Northern Foods factories continue to trade with the UK major supermarkets from within the 2 Sisters group.

On 11 September 2020, Northern Foods sold the Fox's Biscuits brand to Ferrero SpA, an Italian multinational specialized in the production of chocolate and snacks.

== Owned properties ==
- Bowyers
- Baxters Food Group
- Cavaghan & Gray Seafood
- Dalepak Foods
- Donegal Catch
- Dorset Chilled Foods
- Eden Vale
- Elkes Biscuits
- Emile Tissot
- Ethnic Cuisine
- Express Dairies
- Fenland Foods
- Fletchers, Grain D’Or and Kara Foods
- Fox's Biscuits
- George Payne & Co
- Green Isle Food Groups
- Gunstones Bakery
- Holland's Pies
- Kara Foods
- Lacemont
- Matthew Walker
- NFT Distribution
- Park Cakes
- Pennine Foods
- Pyewipe
- R&K Wise
- Rawmarsh Foods
- Ski
- Smiths Flour Mills
- Solway Foods
- Vanderheul

=== Former ===
- Palethorpes
