= 2024 United Kingdom Shigatoxigenic E. coli outbreak =

Foodborne illness outbreak across UK supermarkets

- Pathogen: Shigatoxigenic Escherichia coli O145
- Location: United Kingdom
- First reported: 25 May 2024
- Date: 25 May-5 July 2024
- Type: Tainted salad leaf in pre-packaged sandwiches, wraps, and salads for supermarkets
- Confirmed cases: 211
- Hospitalized cases: 67
- Deaths: 1
- Territories: England, Scotland, Wales, Northern Ireland

The 2024 United Kingdom shigatoxigenic E. coli outbreak was a Shigatoxigenic Escherichia coli (STEC) O145 outbreak that is believed to have occurred in prepackaged supermarket sandwiches, salads, wraps distributed to and sold in multiple supermarket chains across the United Kingdom such as Aldi, Asda, Co-op, Morrisons, Sainsbury's, WHSmith, and Tesco. As of 27 June 2024, 1 person has died, 211 people were affected by E. coli symptoms, with 67 people requiring hospitalization.

== Background ==
Disease caused by Shiga-toxigenic E. coli differs from Escherichia coli O157:H7 in that it produces Shiga toxin, which in addition to typical bacterial abdominal symptoms like diarrhea and abdominal pain, it can also cause severe damage to small blood vessels in the gastrointestinal tract and kidneys. Inflammation of the digestive tract lining and the glomerular vascular endothelium can potentially lead to hemorrhagic colitis and hemolytic-uremic syndrome respectively.

== Outbreak ==
United Kingdom public health authorities determined that the breakout was linked to the tainting of “a small number of salad leaf products”.

=== Impact ===
Cases of E. coli were first reported on 25 May 2024. On 14 June 2024, the distribution of the 211 reported cases was:

- England: 147 cases
- Scotland: 35 cases
- Wales: 27 cases
- Northern Ireland: 2 cases

With 67 people requiring hospitalization. The ages of people showing disease symptoms ranged from two to 79, with most of the reported symptomatic infections occurring in young adults.

== Recall ==
Several food manufacturers have had to recall multiple products suspected to be tainted with E. coli, with a use-by date of 16 June or earlier.

Recalls include:

- Greencore Group - Voluntarily recalled 45 products, including sandwiches, wraps, and chicken salad. No testing has yet indicated the presence of E. coli in any of their products, but the organization chose to proactively recall several leaf vegetable-containing products to minimize harm to consumers and to spread information about the outbreak.
- Samworth Brothers Manton Wood - Voluntarily recalled 15 sandwich and wrap products also to avoid possible harm despite no traces of E. coli being present yet in tested products.
- THIS! - Issued a recall on its vegan chicken and bacon wrap for units with a use-by date of 18 June or earlier, sold exclusively at WHSmith.

Statements from the Food Standards Agency and British Retail Consortium reported that they were contacting all relevant retailers and food manufacturers in order to work with them on testing potentially tainted products and distributing recall notices emphasizing the potential severe GI and kidney damage STEC O145 organisms can cause.
