= Malt loaf =

Type of sweet leavened bread

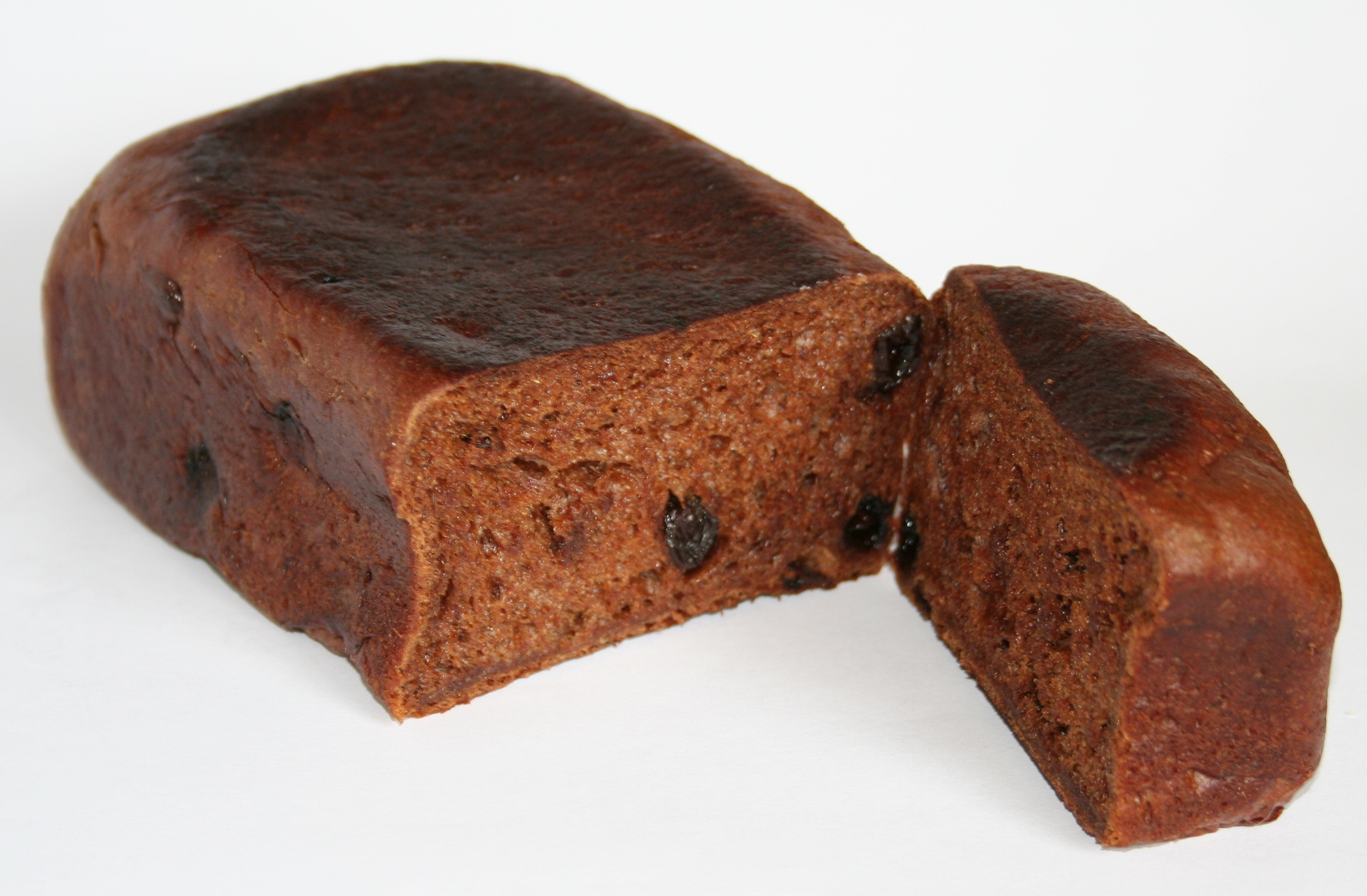
- Place of origin: Scotland
- Region or state: Unknown
- Created by: John Montgomerie
- Main ingredients: Malt, fruits

Malt loaf is a type of sweet leavened bread made with malt extract as a primary ingredient. It has a chewy texture and often contains raisins. It is usually eaten sliced and spread with butter for tea. Malt flour is sometimes used to supplement the flavour.

== History ==
In 1889, John Montgomerie of Scotland filed a US patent application titled "Making Malted Bread," which was granted in 1890. This patent asserted a prior patent existed in Great Britain dated 1886. Montgomerie claimed a novel saccharification process, which involved warming a portion of dough mixed with diastatic malt extract to an appropriate mash temperature and holding it for a time to allow the extract's enzymes to break down some of the starch into maltose.

== Commercial production ==
"Soreen" (/ˈsɔːriːn/) is a brand of malt loaf manufactured in the United Kingdom since the 1930s by a Danish immigrant named John Rahbak Sorenson, the inventor of the Soreen recipe, and "Green", a business partner. In 2004, Warburtons sold the brand to Inter Link Foods. In 2007, Soreen became part of McCambridge Group. In 2014, UK food group Samworth Brothers bought the Soreen brand for an undisclosed sum.

"Harvo" was a brand of malt loaf which was made at the company's bakery at 257 Lawley Street, Birmingham, until the company ceased business in 1973. The Harvo trademark was later held by one of the Premier Foods companies, associated with its takeover of Rank Hovis McDougall, RHBB (IP) Ltd; The Harvo trademark expired in 2006.

== Variants in other countries ==
In December and during the holiday season, a similar type of bread called vörtbröd (literally “wort bread”) is popular in Scandinavia. The dough's water is supplied by beer wort, adding sweetness and flavour to the bread. Several different spices and fruits commonly associated with Christmas are also added, e.g., cloves, cinnamon, ginger, cardamom and raisins.

== See also ==
- Brown bread
- Raisin bread
- Tea loaf
- List of breads
- List of desserts
