= Pork Farms =

Nottingham-based British producer and distributor of mainly pork-based bakery products

- Type: Ltd
- Industry: Food, Pastry
- Founded: 1931
- Headquarters: Nottingham, England
- Key people: Ken Parr
- Products: Pork pies, sausage rolls
- Owner: Lloyds Development Capital
- Number of employees: 2,000+
- Subsidiaries: Bowyers, Farmhouse, Palethorpes, Wall's

Pork Farms is a Nottingham-based British producer and distributor of mainly pork-based bakery products. The company grew from a pie shop founded in 1931, and was floated on the London Stock Exchange in 1971. After several sales and amalgamations, since 2017 the brand has been owned by Lloyds Development Capital.

== History ==
In the early 1940s, recently City and Guilds qualified baker Ken Parr received a £9,000 loan to open his own pie shop. He developed a reputation founded on good baking, and developed the first "original" pork pie based on an old recipe, with signature dark and crispy pastry. He then bought another local pie shop, founded in 1931 which traded under the name Pork Farms, which he adopted for all of his shops.

In the mid-1960s, Parr's business was bought by food tycoon W. Garfield Weston, who made Parr Chairman. In 1969, rival Nottingham pie company TN Parr, formerly owned by Parr's uncle but then by Samworth Brothers, bought out Pork Farms, again bringing together the two companies together under the Pork Farms brand. In 1972, Pork Farms bought rival Holland's Pies. In 1971, the group was floated on the London Stock Exchange as Pork Farms Ltd.

In 1974, Pork Farms and Northern Foods created joint venture company Porkdown Ltd, to supply meat products to French foods group Danone. But immediately after production started, Danone undertook a group-wide review, and on deciding to concentrate on their milk-based products line, closed down the contract. The resultant losses closed Porkdown, and in 1978 lead to the agreed sale of Pork Farms to Northern Foods, after the Samworth family agreed sale of their shares to the group. Later merged by Northern with both Palethorpes of Market Drayton and Bowyers of Trowbridge, Wiltshire, to form Pork Farms Bowyers, the company sold the Bowyers and Palethorpes pork sausage business and brands to the Kerry Group in 2001, to concentrate on baked meat products.

Bought by private equity firm Vision Capital in 2007, with European Union legislation focusing on the need to produce Melton Mowbray Pork Pies within a defined distance of Melton Mowbray, the company chose to close the Trowbridge plant and invest £12 million into the Nottingham plant to increase Melton Mowbray pie production. In 2010, the company employed over 2,000 people at five locations, in Poole, Nottingham, Market Drayton and Shaftesbury.

In 2011, Pork Farms commemorated its 80th anniversary with a £1 million relaunch and a new range of slices. Packaging carried the straplines 'Making & Baking since 1931' and 'Butchers, Bakers, Master Piemakers'.

In 2014, the company proposed to buy two pastry product manufacturing sites, at Spalding and Poole, from Kerry Group; the sale was approved in 2015 on completion of an investigation by the Competition and Markets Authority. The same year, Vision Capital combined Pork Farms with other chilled savoury pastry brands under Addo Food Group.

== Present ==
In 2017, Addo was sold to Lloyds Development Capital, another private equity firm.
