= Palethorpes =

British food company

Palethorpe's
- Company type: Private
- Industry: Meat processing
- Founded: 1850s
- Headquarters: Market Drayton, Shropshire, United Kingdom
- Key people: Henry Palethorpe (founder)
- Products: Sausages

Palethorpe's is a British producer of cooked meat and pastry products and was particularly well known for its branded sausages. Founded in 1852, it was bought by the Bibby Group in 1969 and then by Haverhill Meat Products (a J Sainsbury and Canada Packers joint venture) before becoming part of the Northern Foods Chilled Foods division in 1991. Palethorpes was then part of Pork Farms before being taken over by the Addo Food Group (now the Compleat Food Group since 2021) in turn owned by PAI Partners.

== History ==
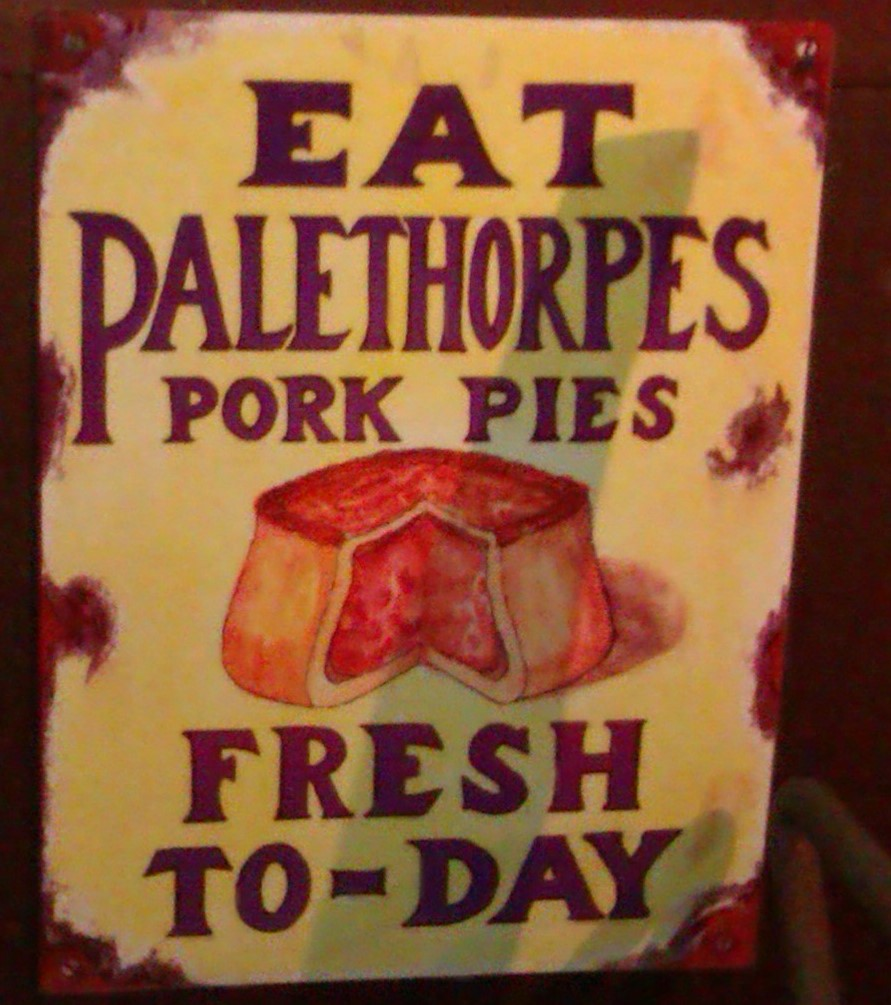
Eat Palethorpes Pork Pies

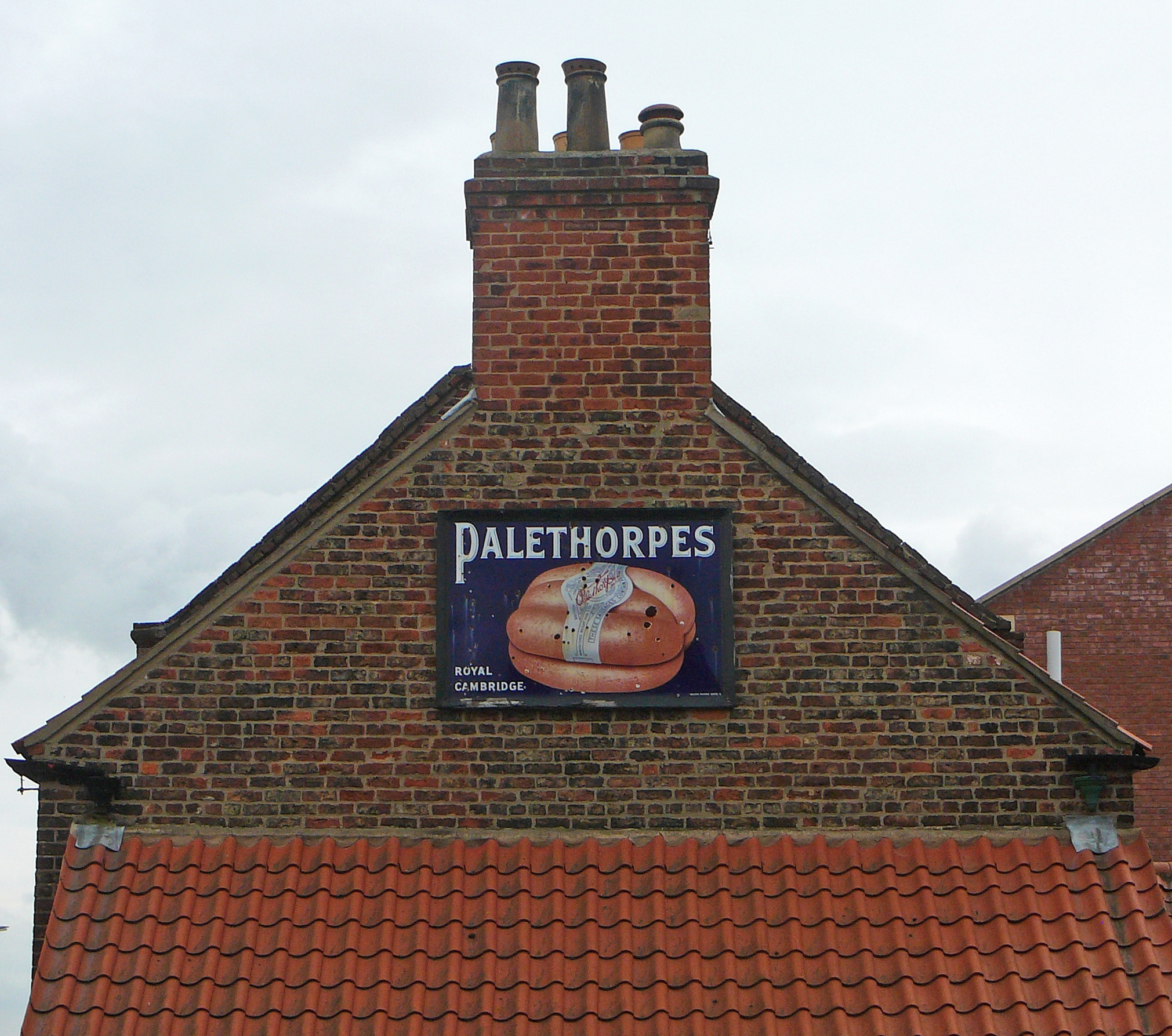
Palethorpes Sausages

Henry Palethorpe was born in 1829 in the Black Country. Setting up business as a butcher in Birmingham in the 1850s, he realised that the United States was flooding the United Kingdom market with cheap bacon and pork.

Palethorpe decided to move into value-added meat processing products, specialising in sausages, with which he had success. The company moved to Tipton in 1896, claiming at the time to be the world's largest sausage producer. The company expanded during World War I, supplying canned meat products to the British Army. However, it lost market share during and after World War II, with restrictions on meat sales due to the amount of meat that was being imported; this gave an advantage to fishmongers such as Mac Fisheries, who boomed during the war.

By the 1960s, with the development of supermarkets in the United Kingdom, the company was experiencing additional pressure. In 1967 Palethorpe's constructed a purpose-built factory employing 400 people in Market Drayton, at a cost of £650,000. This resulted in the closure of the Tipton factory in 1968, after which it was demolished and redeveloped as low-rise council flats.

The high cost of building the new factory saw Palethorpes suffer financial difficulties and in 1969 the business was bought by the Bibby Agricultural Group. In 1980 the business again changed hands being bought by Haverhill Meat Products, a joint venture company owned equally by J Sainsbury and Canada Packers. In 1985 J Sainsbury produced the world's first Mycoprotein (later to become Quorn) product, a Savoury Pie produced at its Palethorpes factory The Company ceased manufacturing and selling Palethorpes branded products in 1986 in order to concentrate on its own label business. The Palethorpes brand name was reborn briefly in the mid-1990s as a value brand for Sainsbury's pies and pasties, although it is no longer used.

Palethorpes became a part of Northern Foods, at that time the UK's largest manufacturer of meat and savoury products, in 1991. It became part of the Chilled Foods division known as Premium Savoury Products. In January 2007 Northern Foods sold most of its Savoury Pastry business to Vision Capital; this included Pork Farms, Bowyers and Palethorpes.

Now rebranded by Vision Capital as Addo Food Group, the Market Drayton plant presently employs 700 people. The company supplies foods to leading retailers to be sold under their own brand names. Customer companies include Asda and Sainsbury's.

In 2021, the merger of Winterbotham Darby and Addo Food Group formed the Compleat Food Group, which has taken over the Palethorpes brand and assets.

== Links ==
Compleat Food Group Website

Brief History of Palethorpes in Tipton

Palethorpes Tipton Factory 1935

Brief History of Palethorpes from the J. Sainsbury Journal

News of Palethorpes sale by Northern Foods in 2006

National Archives article about favourite festive foods from the past including Palethorpes Sausages
