= Christopher Haskins =

Irish businessman and peer (1937–2026)

The Right Honourable The Lord Haskins

Member of the House of Lords
- Lord Temporal
- Life peerage 25 July 1998 – 1 December 2020

Personal details
- Born: Christopher Robin Haskins; 30 May 1937 Dublin, Ireland
- Died: 26 March 2026 (aged 88)
- Party: Independent (since 2005); Labour Party (until 2005)
- Education: St Columba's College, Dublin; Trinity College, Dublin

Christopher Robin Haskins, Baron Haskins (30 May 1937 – 26 March 2026) was an Irish-born businessman and life peer, who was a member of the British House of Lords from 1998 to 2020.

== Early life ==
Christopher Robin Haskins was born in Dublin, Ireland on 30 May 1937. The son of a Protestant farmer, he attended St Columba's College, Dublin, and Trinity College, Dublin, where was known as a student radical and member of the Campaign for Nuclear Disarmament. Graduating with an honours degree in modern history, he contemplated becoming a journalist but later joined De La Rue.

== Career ==
Haskins proposed to marry Gilda Horsley, whose father consented upon condition that Haskins joined the family business, Northern Dairies, based in Yorkshire, England. Haskins agreed and joined the company in 1962. Haskins foresaw the huge demand for good-quality prepared meals, and turned the company into Northern Foods, whose brands include Ski yoghurt and Bowyers sausages, while Marks & Spencer are the company's largest customer for ready meals. Haskins became a director in 1967, deputy chairman in 1974, and was chairman from 1980 to 2002.

== House of Lords ==
Haskins was ennobled as a life peer with the title Baron Haskins, of Skidby, in the County of the East Riding of Yorkshire, on 25 July 1998. During 2001, at the height of the foot and mouth disease epidemic, he became Prime Minister Tony Blair's 'rural tsar'. Lord Haskins retired from the Lords on 1 December 2020.

In August 2005, it was revealed that Haskins had donated £2,000 to the campaign of Scottish Liberal Democrat Member of Parliament for Inverness, Nairn, Badenoch and Strathspey, Danny Alexander. Following an investigation, Haskins was expelled from the Labour party for this action. He subsequently sat as a crossbencher.

He was Chairman of the Better Regulation Task Force and a member of the New Deal Task Force. A pro-European, he was a leading member of the Britain in Europe campaign, the House of Lords European Sub-Committee, and was a former chairman of the European Movement. He was a fellow board member of Yorkshire Forward and also Chairman of the Council of the Open University. In 2016, he was chair of the Humber local enterprise partnership.

== Death ==
Haskins died on 26 March 2026, at the age of 88.
