= Jimmy Boyle (artist) =

Scottish criminal & artist (born 1944)

James Boyle (born 17 May 1944) is a Scottish former gangster and convicted murderer who became a sculptor and novelist after his release from prison.

== Imprisonment ==
In 1967, Boyle was sentenced to life imprisonment for the murder of another gangland figure, William "Babs" Rooney. He served fourteen years before his release in 1980. Boyle has always denied killing Rooney but has acknowledged having been a violent and sometimes ruthless moneylender from the Gorbals, which was once one of the roughest and most deprived areas of Glasgow. During his sentence at the special unit of Barlinnie Prison, Riddrie, he discovered a passion for art, with the help of the special unit's art therapist, Joyce Laing. He wrote an autobiography, A Sense of Freedom (1977), which was later turned into a film of the same name. In 1979, whilst still a prisoner at Barlinnie, he was commissioned to produce a memorial statue of poet William McGonagall; however, the project was never completed due to various difficulties.

In 1980, while still in prison, Boyle married psychiatrist Sara Trevelyan. In 2017, Trevelyan wrote Freedom Found, a book about her twenty-year marriage to Boyle. In an interview after the book's publication, she stated that she had never felt unsafe with him.

== Life after release ==
Upon his release from prison on 26 October 1981, he moved to Edinburgh to continue his artistic career. He designed the largest concrete sculpture in Europe called "Gulliver" for the Craigmillar Festival Society in 1976. In 1983, Boyle set up the Gateway Exchange with Trevelyan and artist Evlynn Smith; a charitable organisation so he could keep in contact with ex prisoners. As part of his life licence, he wasn't allowed contact with ex prisoners, so it was a front to circumnavigate the legal system. The Gateway Exchange offered art therapy workshops to recovering drug addicts and ex-convicts. Though the project secured funding from private sources (including actor Sir Sean Connery, comedian Sir Billy Connolly and John Paul Getty) it lasted only a few years.

In 1994, his son James, a drug addict, was murdered in the Oatlands neighbourhood of Glasgow.

Boyle has published Pain of Confinement: Prison Diaries (1984), and a novel, Hero of the Underworld (1999). The latter was adapted for a French film, La Rage et le Rêve des Condamnés (The Anger and Dreams of the Condemned), and won the best documentary prize at the Fifa Montreal awards in 2002. He also wrote a novel, A Stolen Smile, which is about the theft of the Mona Lisa and how it ends up hidden on a Scottish housing scheme. It was rumoured that Disney bought the film rights, but Boyle has denied this.

In 1998, he was named as a financial donor of the Labour Party.

He divides his time between France and Morocco with his second wife, Kate Fenwick, a British actress. They married at a ceremony in Marrakesh, Morocco, on 27 October 2007.

== Cultural impact ==
The character Nicky Dryden in the 1999 film The Debt Collector is reportedly loosely based on Boyle.

The punk band The Exploited released a song titled Jimmy Boyle in 1982.
