= Ginsters =

Company based in Callington in Cornwall, in the south-west of England

- Type: Ltd
- Industry: Food, pastry
- Founded: 1969
- Headquarters: Callington, Cornwall, England
- Products: Pasties, sandwiches, snacks
- Owner: Samworth Brothers
- Number of employees: 700+
- Website: ginsters.co.uk

Ginsters /ˈɡɪnstərz/ is a company based in the town of Callington, east Cornwall, England. The largest pasty maker in the UK in turnover, it specialises in making mass-produced pasties, sausage rolls, sandwiches, pasta bowls and other savoury snacks. Since 1977, it has been owned by the Samworth Brothers.

== History ==
The Ginsters family were in the business of supplying horse manure to foundries for mixing with sand for the moulds for casting. The business was based in West Bromwich before finally moving to Longwood Lane, Walsall. After the Second World War, Geoff Ginster approached his father saying that he wished to move with his family down to the West Country. He asked his father if it would be possible to have his inheritance early in order to so do. Originally moving to Devon, Geoff Ginster started making clotted cream and became very successful to the point where the Milk Marketing Board offered to buy him out. Geoff refused only to be met with the response, "if he did not sell the MMB would cease to supply his business with milk". Geoff Ginster having no choice moved to Cornwall and started his Cornish Pasty business in 1969. They started the business in a near-derelict egg-packing station, with a staff of four. Geoffrey Ginster started production of pasties from a "secret recipe" he claimed to have obtained from a ship's cook. Production slowly increased until by 1970 a staff of 30 was producing 48,000 units a day. Ginsters pasties were initially sold to pubs, cafés, corner shops and other small stores in Plymouth and nearby seaside towns, before expanding further to cover southern England.

In 1977, Geoffrey Ginster retired and sold the business to Samworth Brothers, leading to further growth, modernisation and development. An adjoining factory was acquired, renovated and equipped with modern baking and packing facilities. It was renamed the Tamar Bakery, and was later extended with new, largely automated, machinery. When it went into operation the original Ginsters bakery was closed. In 1984, Ginsters was producing 1.5 million pasties a week and had become the biggest employer in East Cornwall's private sector. In 1987, a new bakery, named Lynher Bakery after the nearby River Lynher, was built alongside the Tamar Bakery.

In 1990, Ginsters commenced advertising and promotional campaigns to raise awareness of their product. This resulted in Ginsters Original Cornish Pasty being stocked by leading supermarkets, petrol stations, convenience stores and motorway service stations across Britain. Ginsters claim that their Original Cornish Pasty is the biggest-selling product in the savoury pastry market, and that during a twenty-year period 450 million of them have been sold.

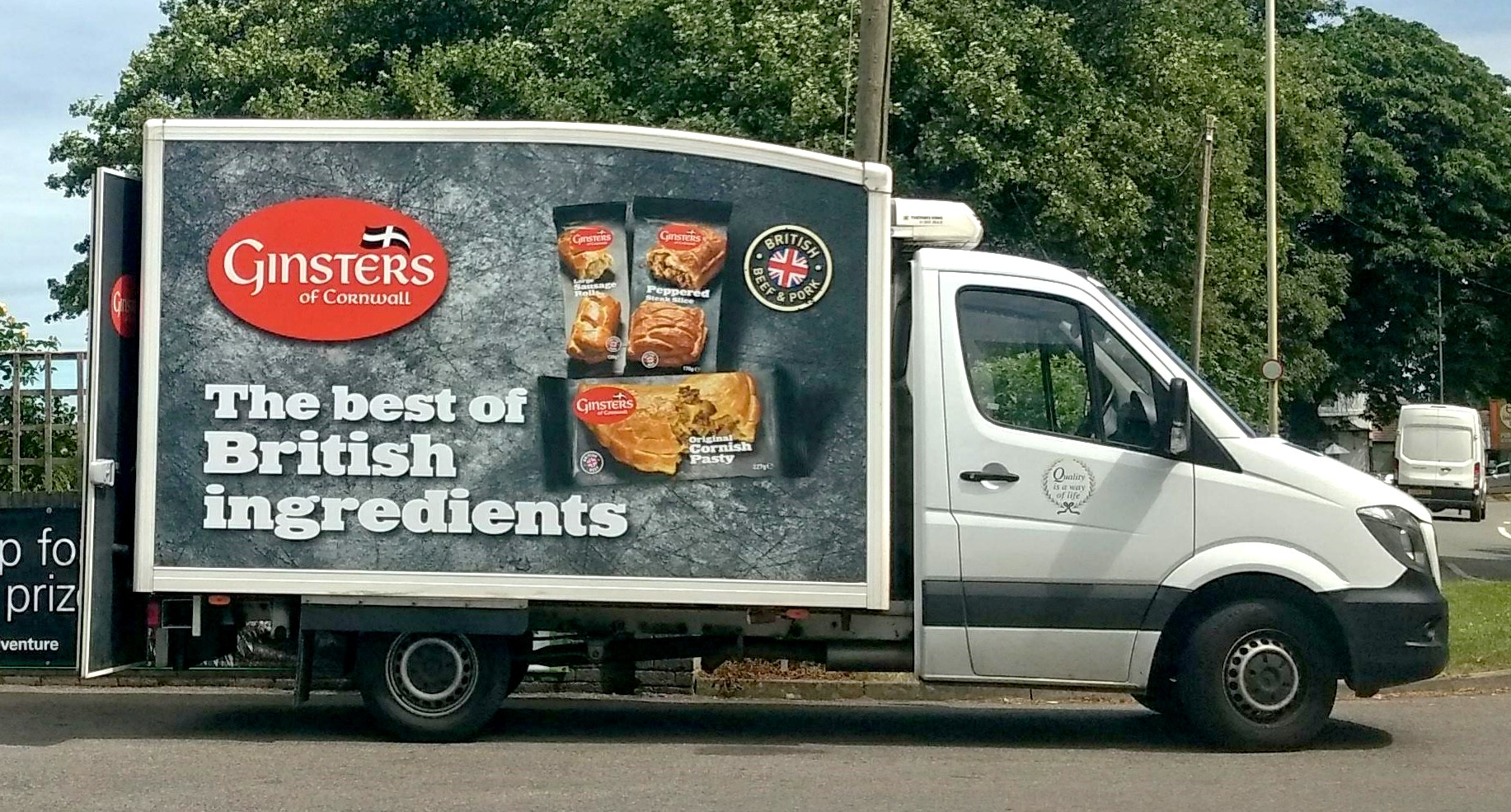
Ginsters delivery van

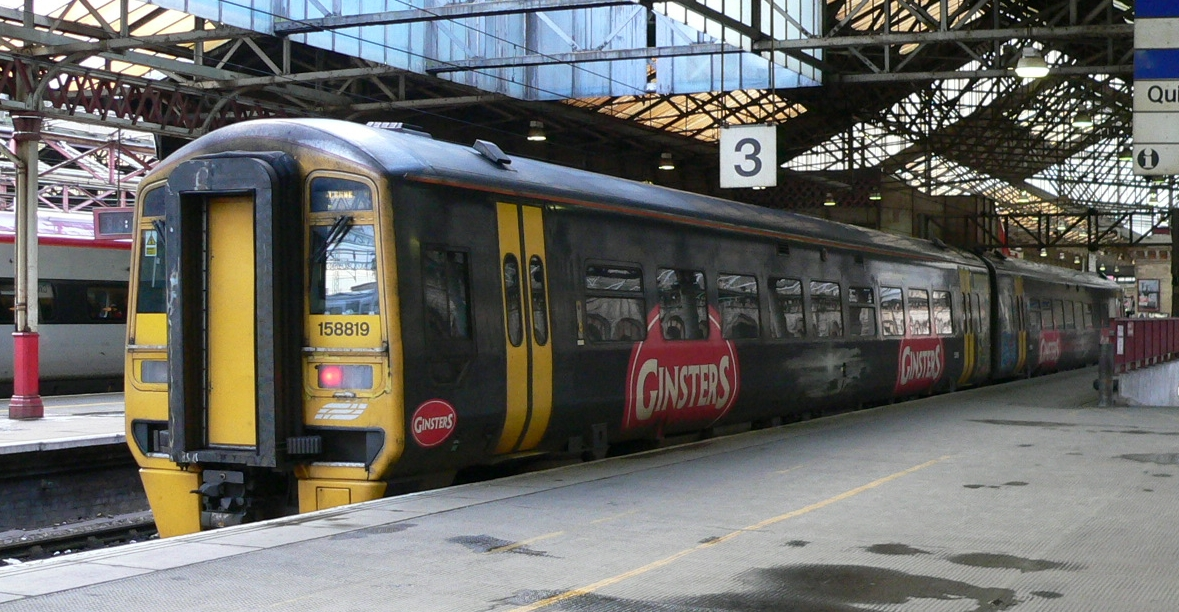
Ginsters liveried Class 158 Sprinter at Crewe railway station

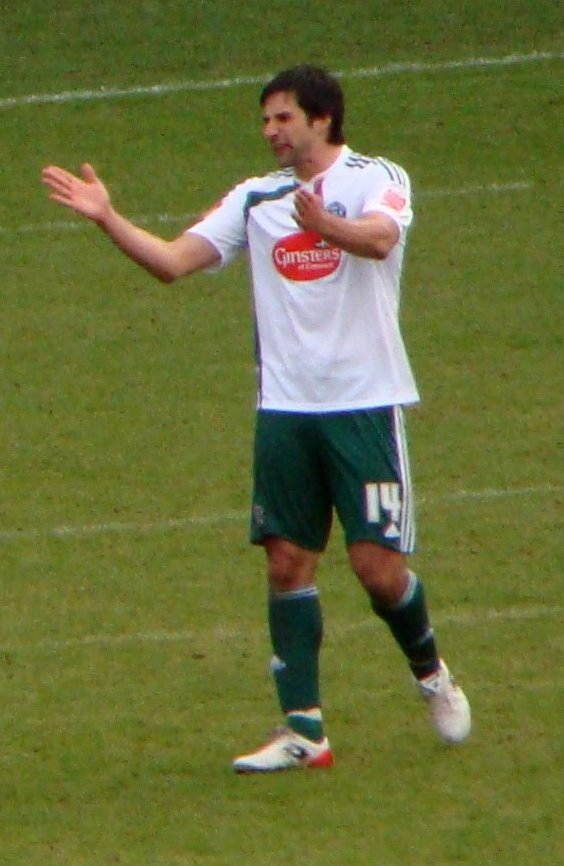
Rory Fallon of Plymouth Argyle F.C. in a Ginsters sponsored shirt

== Politics ==
The company has donated at least £32,000 to the Conservative Party since 2002, on top of the £610,000 donated by the individual Samworth brothers since 2010.

== Products ==
Ginsters’ most popular product is the Original Cornish Pasty. Cornish pasties were granted protected geographical indication (PGI) status from the European Union in 2011. This product is still made using Ginsters’ original recipe. Since the 1990s the product range has been extended to include a variety of pasties, savoury slices, sausage rolls, pork pies, hot pies, snacks, sandwiches, flatbreads, wraps and packaged salads. Ginsters claim to source their ingredients from neighbouring farms in Cornwall.

=== Vegan products ===
From 2019, Ginsters has been producing vegan products, for example its Moroccan vegetable pasty, which won an award in 2020. In 2021 the company introduced additional vegan pasty fillings, including Bombay potato and spinach, and Cajun spiced sweet potato and chickpea.

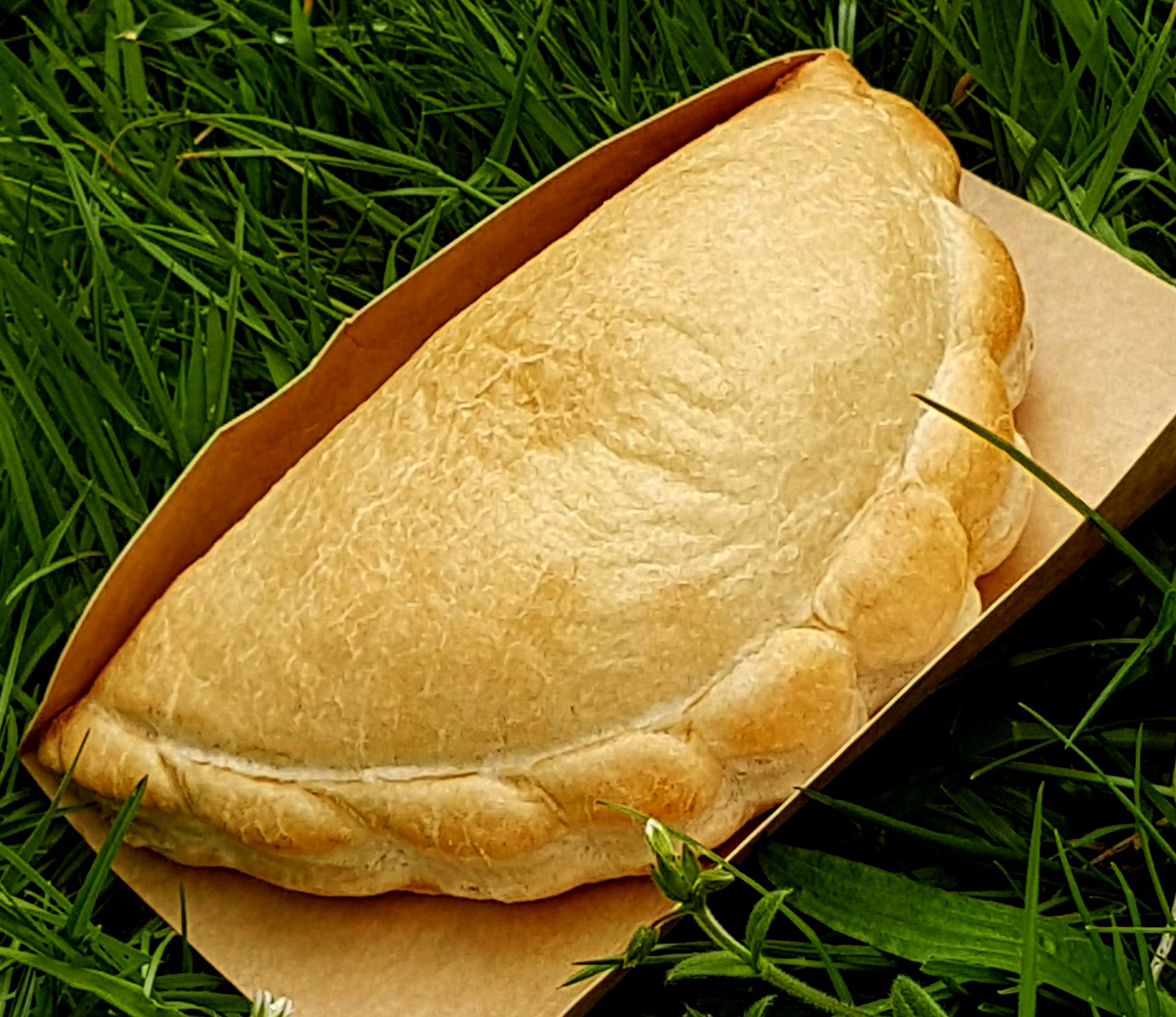
Ginsters vegan Bombay potato and spinach pasty

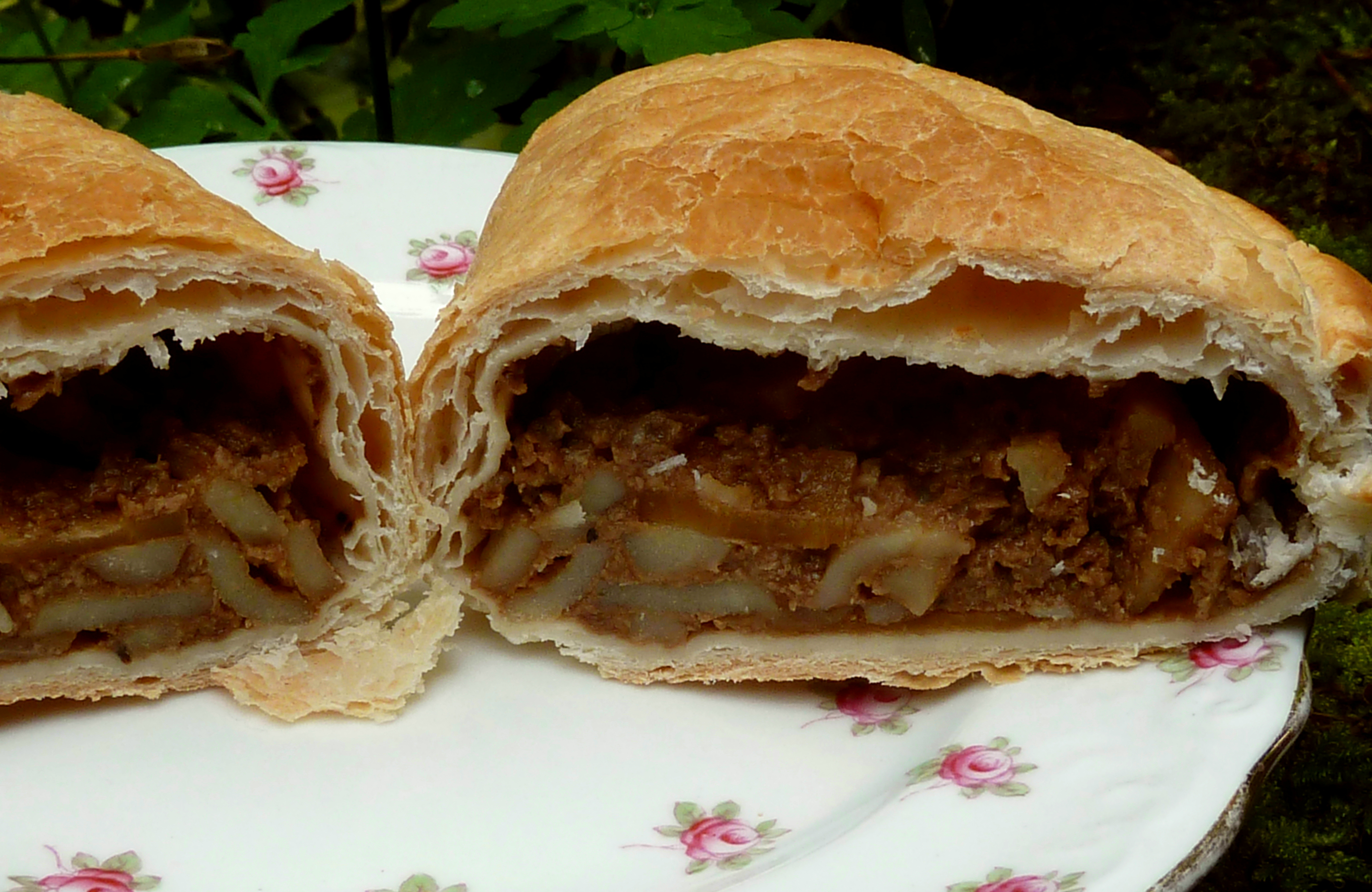
Ginsters vegan Quorn pasty

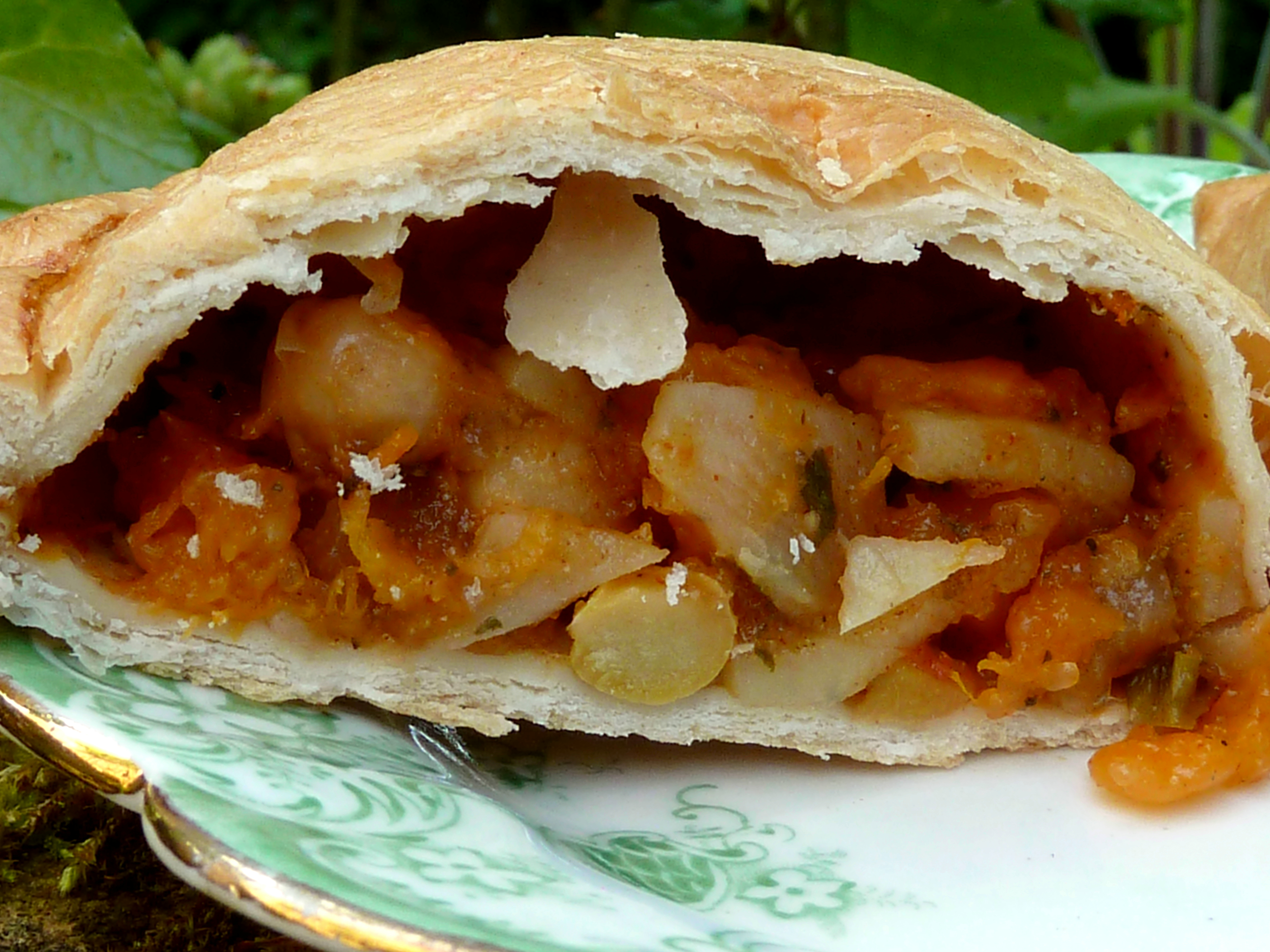
Ginsters vegan Moroccan spiced vegetable pasty

== Sponsorship ==
From 2002 to 2011, Ginsters sponsored football club Plymouth Argyle F.C., rekindling this sponsorship in 2016 with a 3-year deal. It also sponsors Callington Town FC, Callington Rugby Club and Launceston Rugby Club ("The Cornish All Blacks").

Ginsters became the title sponsor for Speedworks Motorsport in the 2019 British Touring Car Championship season with the manufacturer backed Toyota Corolla. The team entry was known as Team Toyota GB with Ginsters.
