= Craig Dunain Hospital =

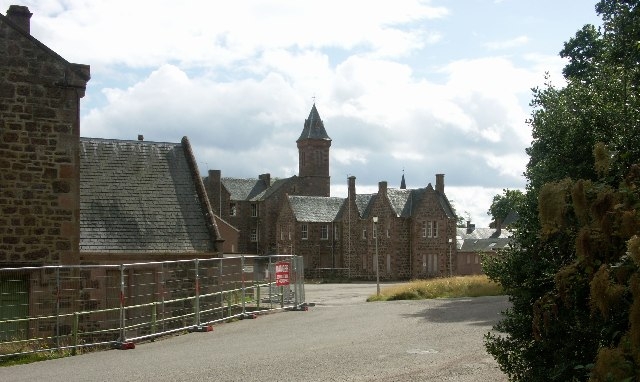
- Craig Dunain Hospital

- Shown in Inverness

Geography
- Location: Inverness, Scotland
- Coordinates: 57.4637°N 4.2749°W

Organisation
- Care system: NHS Scotland
- Type: Psychiatric hospital

Services
- Emergency department: No

History
- Founded: 1864
- Closed: 2000

Links
- Lists: Hospitals in Scotland

Craig Dunain Hospital was a mental health facility near Inverness in Scotland. The former hospital is a Category B listed building.

== History ==
The hospital, which was designed by James Matthews, opened as the Inverness District Asylum in May 1864. Additional male and female hospital wards were completed in 1898, a large new recreation hall was added in 1927 and a new chapel, designed by William Mitchell, was completed in 1963. After the introduction of Care in the Community in the early 1980s, the hospital went into a period of decline and closed in 2000. Although the main building was badly damaged in a wilful fire raising attack in 2007, remedial work was carried out, including replacement of one of the towers in spring 2019, to allow the building to be converted for residential use as "Great Glen Hall". A modern facility, known as New Craigs Psychiatric Hospital, was built to the north of the old hospital.
