= Alec Horsley =

English businessman and peace activist (1902–1993)

- Born: Alec Stewart Horsley; 1 September 1902; Ripley, Derbyshire, England
- Died: 11 June 1993 (aged 90); Hessle, East Yorkshire, England
- Occupations: Businessman, peace activist
- Known for: Founder of Northern Foods

Alec Stewart Horsley (1 September 1902 – 11 June 1993) was a British businessman and peace activist best known as the founder of Northern Foods, one of the United Kingdom’s largest food manufacturing companies.

== Early life and education ==
Horsley was born in Ripley, Derbyshire, and educated at Worcester College, Oxford, where he studied Philosophy, Politics and Economics. After university, he briefly joined the Colonial Service before entering the family dairy-importing business in Hull.

== Business career ==
In 1932, Horsley joined Pape & Co., a Hull-based condensed milk importer. He later established a milk-processing factory at Holme-on-Spalding-Moor in 1937.

In 1942, he registered the expanded dairy operations as Northern Dairies, which later became Northern Foods. Through acquisitions and diversification into chilled and prepared foods, the company grew into a major supplier to British retailers, including Marks & Spencer.

Northern Foods was later listed on the London Stock Exchange and became a constituent of the FTSE 100 Index.

== Political and social activism ==
A lifelong Quaker, Horsley was active in peace movements and civic reform. During the 1940s, he became involved with the Common Wealth Party and later supported the anti-nuclear Committee of 100 movement.

He served as a city councillor in Hull between 1945 and 1949 and was appointed Sheriff of Kingston upon Hull in 1953.

== Personal life ==
Horsley married Susan Howitt in 1932; they had five children. He was the grandfather of the writer and artist Sebastian Horsley.

He died on 11 June 1993 in Hessle, East Yorkshire.

== Honours ==
In 1982, he received an honorary doctorate from the University of Hull in recognition of his contribution to business and civic life.
