= Hackney Central =

Area of Hackney, London, England

Coordinates: 51.543307°N 0.059486°W

Hackney Central: Hackney
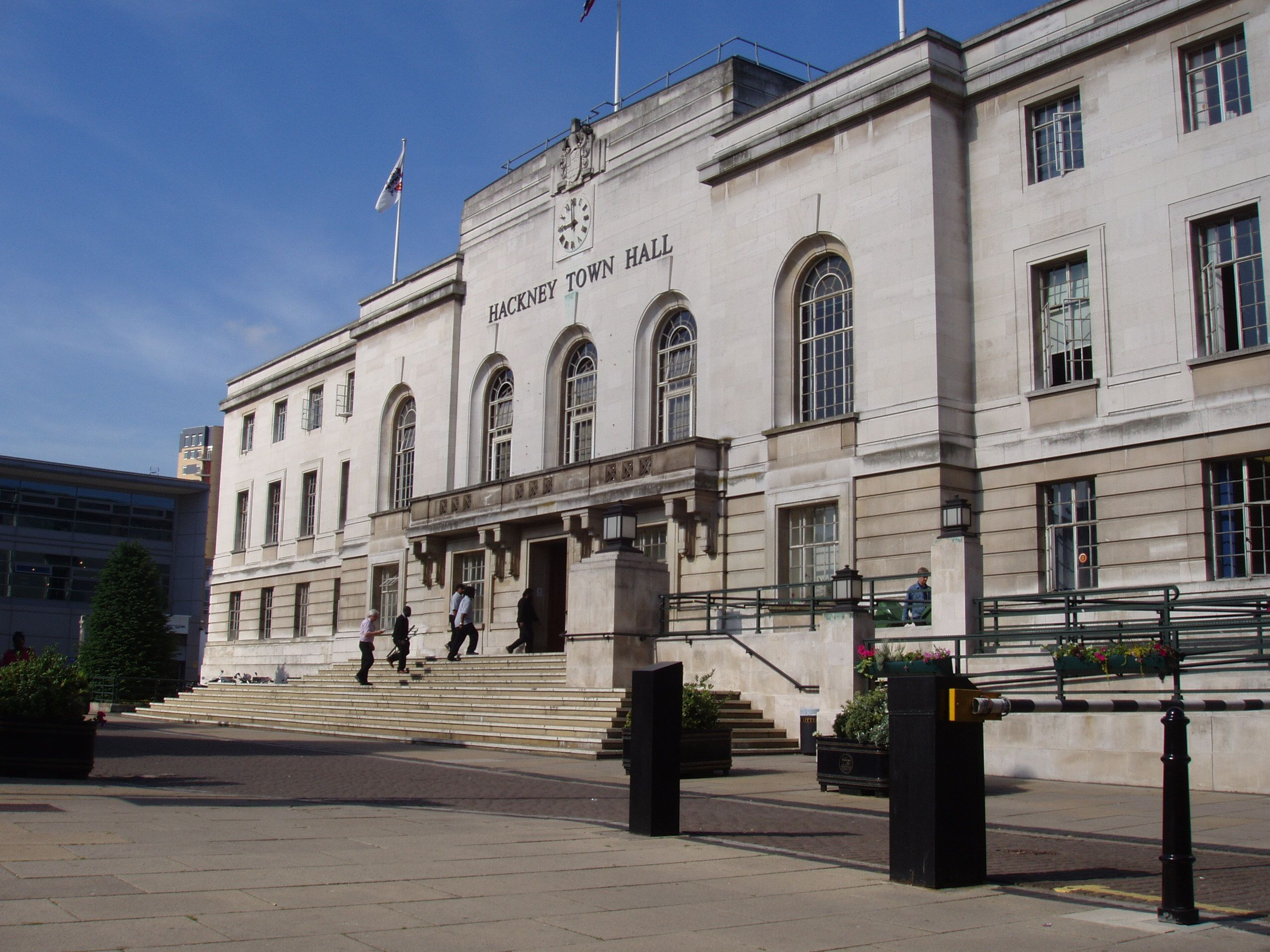
- Hackney Town Hall, built 1934–37 for the Metropolitan Borough of Hackney

- Location within Greater London
- Population: 77,336 (2011)
- OS grid reference: TQ345845
  - Charing Cross: 4 mi (6.4 km) SW
- London borough: Hackney
- Ceremonial county: Greater London
- Region: London
- Country: England
- Sovereign state: United Kingdom
- Post town: LONDON
- Postcode district: E8 E9
- Dialling code: 020
- Police: Metropolitan
- Fire: London
- Ambulance: London
- UK Parliament: Hackney South and Shoreditch
- London Assembly: North East

Hackney Central is a sub-district of Hackney in the London Borough of Hackney in London, England and is four miles (6.4 km) northeast of Charing Cross.

The Hackney Central area is focused on Mare Street and the retail areas to the north of it including Narrow Way and surrounding local area around Hackney Downs railway station. As such it extends north from Regent's Canal (with Bethnal Green), takes in most of Broadway Market and London Fields, and follows each side of Mare Street till it terminates in the vicinity of Hackney Central railway station. The area also includes the central retail area which extends from Hackney Downs station in the west to Morning Lane and goes in between Wick Road (Homerton) and Cassland Road (South Hackney) till meeting Hackney Wick, to the east.

Hackney Central is the area that once would have been known as Hackney Village. This was a place that flourished from the Tudor period, when principal members of the Court had their houses in the surrounding area, and King Henry VIII of England had a palace (located near the modern Lea Bridge Road roundabout). Hackney Central remained a popular resort for Londoners until the end of the Georgian era, when this suburb of London began to be completely built up. Railways, trams and factories brought an end to Hackney's rural atmosphere during the Victorian era, and its fortunes declined.

The industries of nearby Homerton and the Lee Valley have largely disappeared, leaving the NHS and local council as the largest employers. Successive waves of immigrants, both from abroad and within the United Kingdom, make modern Hackney a culturally vibrant part of inner London, with both the benefits and challenges that this brings.

Extensive post-World War II redevelopment replaced much of the housing stock, but the Georgian housing and Victorian terraces that remain have become popular again.

== History ==
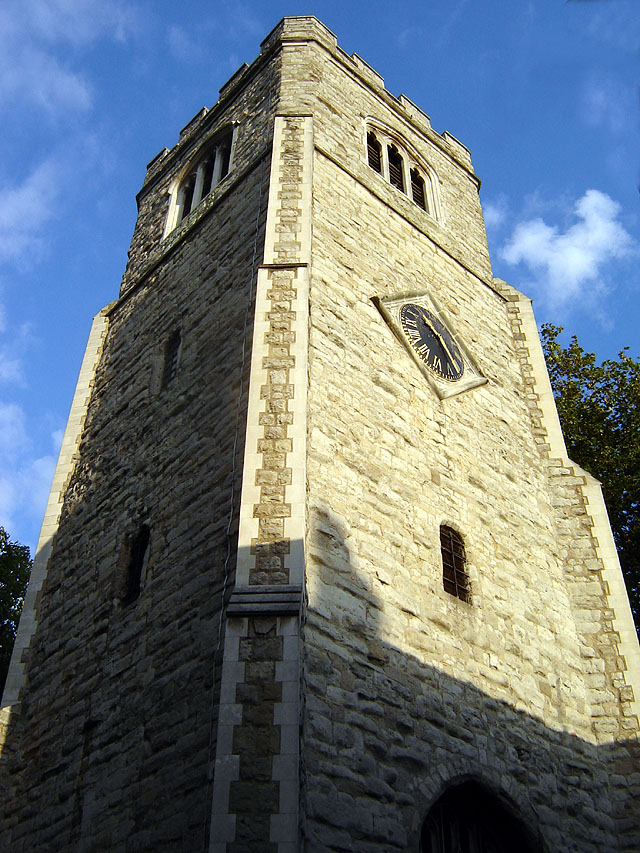
St Augustine's Tower. Dating back to the 13th century, this is Hackney Central's oldest building. It is all that remains of the original medieval parish church, which was demolished in 1798 (September 2005)

In 1727 Daniel Defoe said of the villages of Hackney

All these, except the Wyck-house, are within a few years so encreas'd in buildings, and so fully inhabited, that there is no comparison to be made between their present and past state: Every separate hamlet is encreas'd, and some of them more than treble as big as formerly; Indeed as this whole town is included in the bills of mortality, tho' no where joining to London, it is in some respects to be call'd a part of it.

This town is so remarkable for the retreat of wealthy citizens, that there is at this time near a hundred coaches kept in it; tho' I will not join with a certain satyrical author, who said of Hackney, that there were more coaches than Christians in it.

=== Early origins ===
In Roman times Ermine Street passed to the west of what is now Hackney Central. The land was covered with open oak and hazel woodlands, with marshland around the rivers and streams that crossed the area. Hackney lay in the Catevallauni tribal territory.

The name Hackney derives from a 5th- or 6th-century Saxon settlement known as Haca's ey – or raised ground in marshland. The settlement was near Hackney Brook, and was probably on the higher ground around the later St Augustine's Tower. Hackney is not mentioned by name in the Norman Domesday Book; at that time it formed a part of the manor of Stepney.

=== Tudor village ===
Little remains of early Hackney, except the Tudor St Augustine's Tower, which survives as Hackney's oldest building. The churchyard, Hackney Brook, and the surrounding villages prevented Hackney's expansion, and by 1605 the village had a lower rateable value than the other divisions of the parish. In Tudor times there were a number of fine houses along Church Street (now Mare Street), but many Tudor courtiers lived in nearby Homerton. On the site of Brooke House college, in Clopton was sited one of Henry VIII's palaces, where his daughter Mary took the Oath of Supremacy. Her guardian was Henry's Principal Secretary of State Ralph Sadleir, a resident of Bryck Place, Homerton.

A further cluster of houses existed in medieval times, where Well Street enters Mare Street. The Loddiges family founded their extensive plant nursery business on open ground to the north-east of here in the 18th century.

=== Georgian period ===
By 1724, while still consisting of a single street, there is an unbroken line of buildings, except by the churchyard and by the brook, with large gardens behind for the finer houses and inns. The 16th-century church, despite galleries being installed, became too small for the needs of the parish, and parliament was petitioned in 1790 for a modern larger church to be built. This began in 1791 on a field to the north east of the old church, but was bedeviled by builders' bankruptcies and not finally completed until 1812–1813 when the tower and porches were added. Further disaster struck in a fire of 1955. In the churchyard stands the tomb of Francis Beaufort, deviser of the Beaufort wind force scale; and that of John Hunter, the second governor of New South Wales, Australia. The Loddiges family also has a tomb in the churchyard and memorials within the church. The parish burial register records the death of "Anthony, a poore old negro, aged 105" in 1630. This is all that is known of Anthony, the first recorded black resident of Hackney.

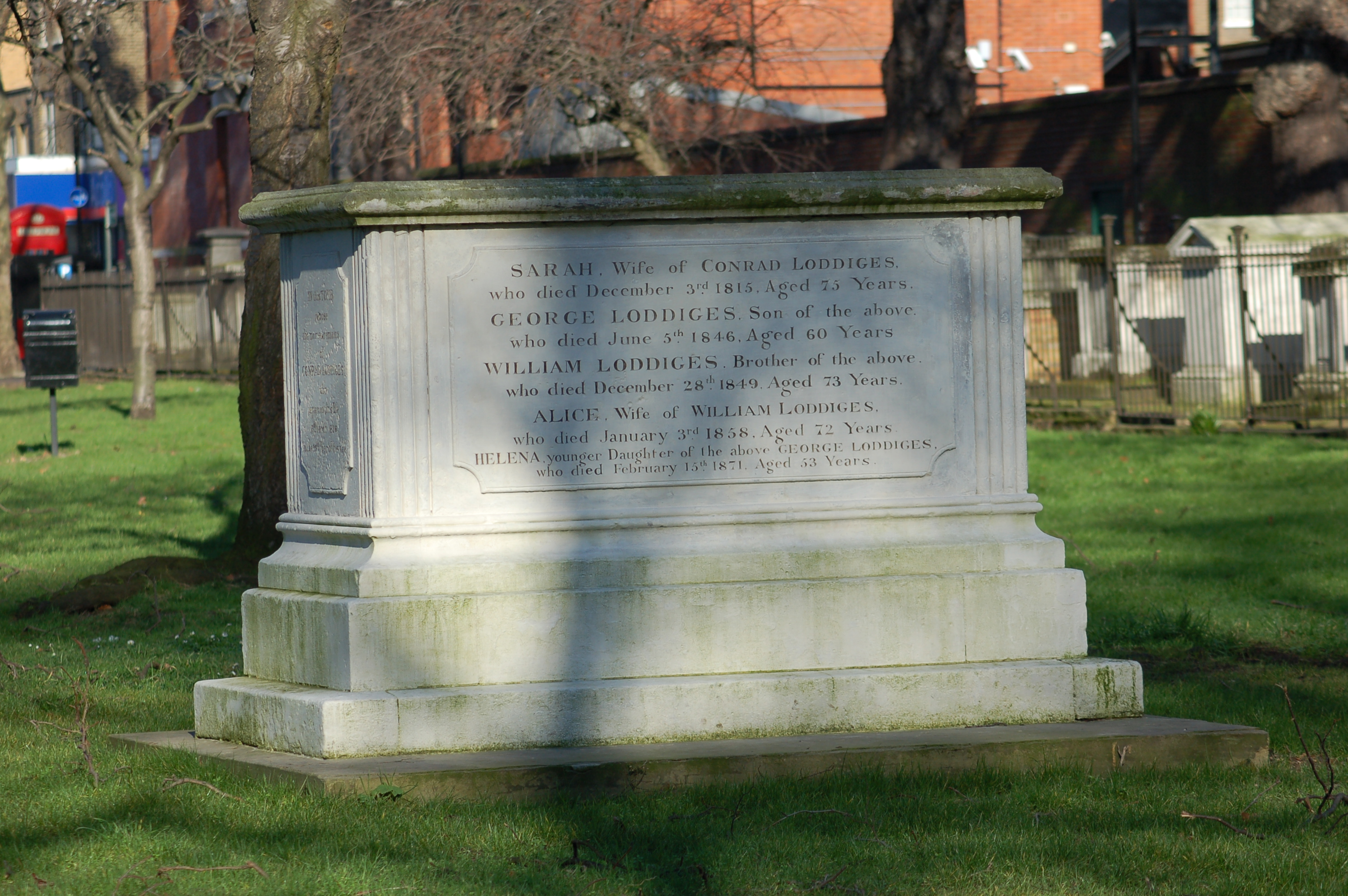
Loddiges' family vault in St John's Church Gardens

The villages of Hackney, Lower Clapton and Homerton remained separated by fields into the 19th century. The fine houses remained, with large gardens behind. Artisans and labourers lived in cottages established in these gardens. There was not the room, or the will, for major rebuilding in the village. By 1800, St Thomas' Square, a Georgian square was laid out on the southern end of Mare Street. By the 20th century, these buildings had declined and were replaced with public housing. An early 18th-century mansion, now the New Landsdown Club, but once the headquarters of Elizabeth Fry's British Ladies' Society for Promoting the Reformation of Female Prisoners remains at 195 Mare Street. It is Grade II* listed, but in poor condition and on the English Heritage register of buildings at risk. In neighbouring Homerton, (to the east of the churchyard) Sutton Place was built by 1806, near Sutton House.

The rebuilding of the Church, on a field to the north of the village, altered the course of the road and allowed the establishment of Clapton Square in 1816, in nearby Lower Clapton. Much of the area to the north and east of the churchyard now forms the Clapton Square Conservation Area, designated in 1969.

=== Victorian Hackney ===
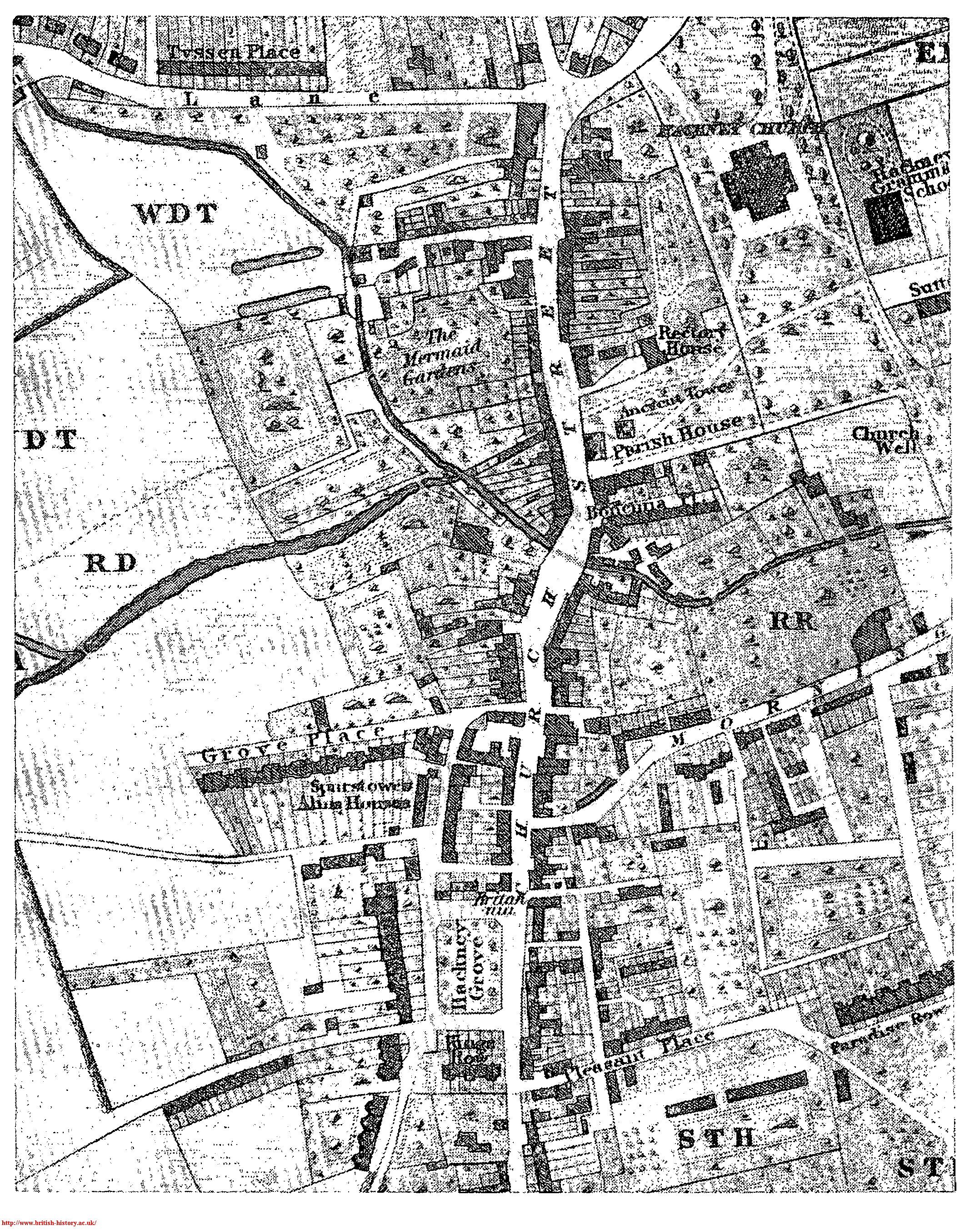
1830 Map of Hackney village

A map showing the Hackney ward of Hackney Metropolitan Borough as it appeared in 1916.

During the Victorian era, many of the old buildings were swept away and the estates broken up to form streets of terraced housing. The change from rural suburb to firmly urban, was marked by the arrival of the railway in 1850, with a great iron rail bridge crossing Mare Street. Trams began to make their appearance on the streets in the 1870s, and a tram depot opened in 1882 on Bohemia Place. (Note: The North Metropolitan Tramways Co. from Bishopsgate ran through Mare Street, and thence to Clapton, opened in 1872, and was extended to Clapton Common in 1875, reaching Stamford Hill in 1902)

Increased access and the culverting of Hackney Brook in 1859–1860, brought about the present road layout. Many older buildings were pulled down to intensify development and to make room for street widening and the railway. In 1802 the parish vestry hall on the Narrow Way was rebuilt. In 1900 it was re-faced in stone and given a pediment inscribed 'Hackney Old Town Hall'. A new town hall was built on a different site in 1866; it was in turn superseded by today's Town Hall, built in 1937. By the turn of the 20th century, only St Johns Gardens, and Clapton Square, the areas around the 1791 church, remained as public open space.

== Governance ==
There is a Hackney Central ward electoral ward for Hackney Council, which, as electoral wards require roughly equal electorates, corresponds only very roughly to the area after which it is named.

== Geography ==
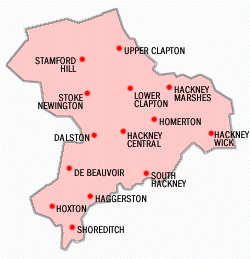
Districts within the London Borough of Hackney.

Hackney Central is the geographic, administrative and retail core of Hackney and is based on the village that grew up within the pre-existing parish of Hackney which had been in existence, with consistent boundaries, from the medieval period.

The term Hackney Proper was often applied to that wider district which also includes Hackney Wick, South Hackney, West Hackney, Homerton, Dalston, De Beauvoir Town, Stamford Hill and Upper and Lower Clapton.

In 1965 the term Hackney was used to name the London Borough of Hackney, however the borough also includes Shoreditch and Stoke Newington.

Hackney Town Hall is about 5 miles (8 km) north-east of Charing Cross; and 3.8 miles (6.1 km) from the GLA City Hall near Tower Bridge.

== Landmarks ==
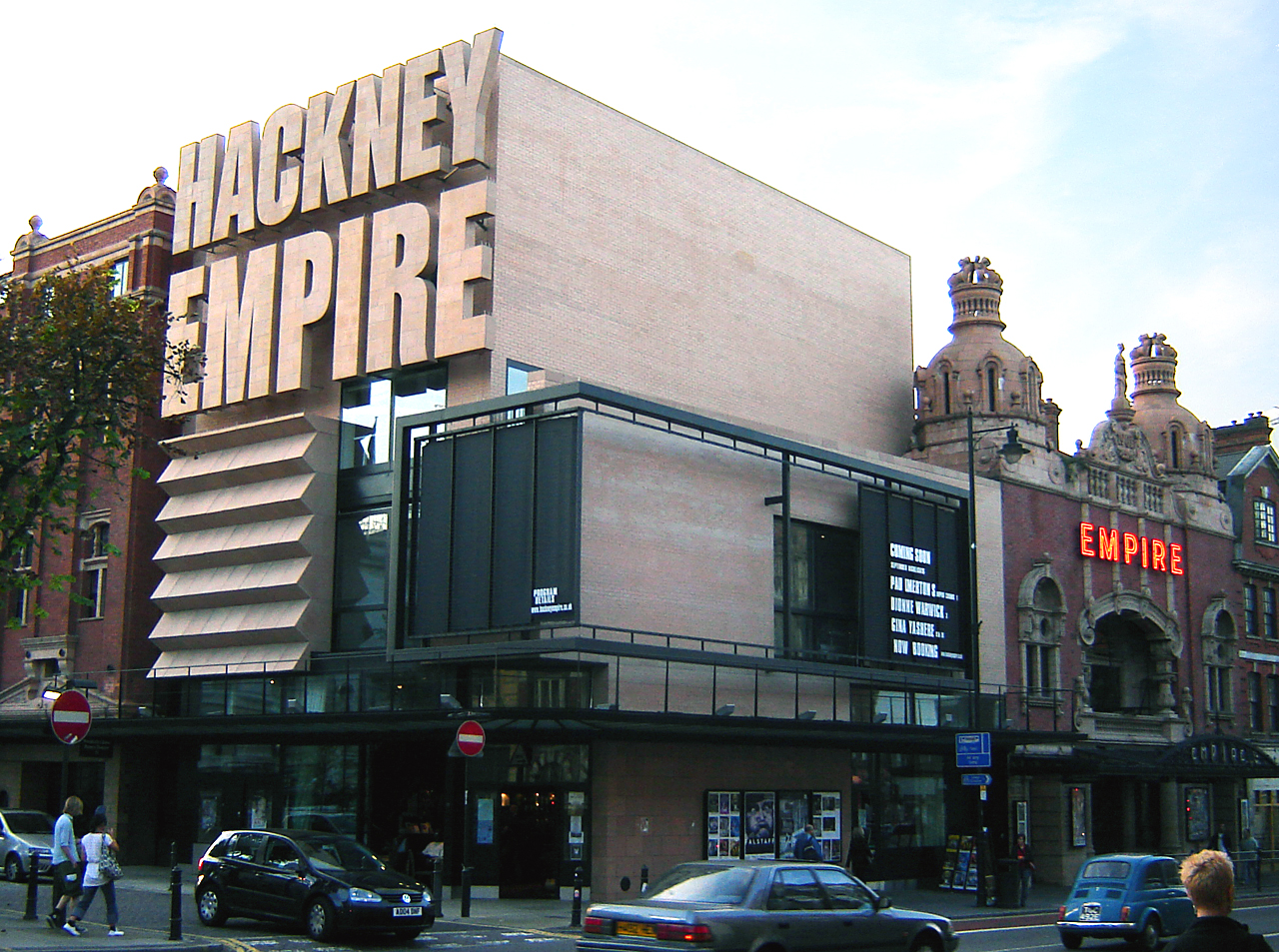
The refurbished Hackney Empire is one of the oldest surviving music halls in Britain. (September 2005)

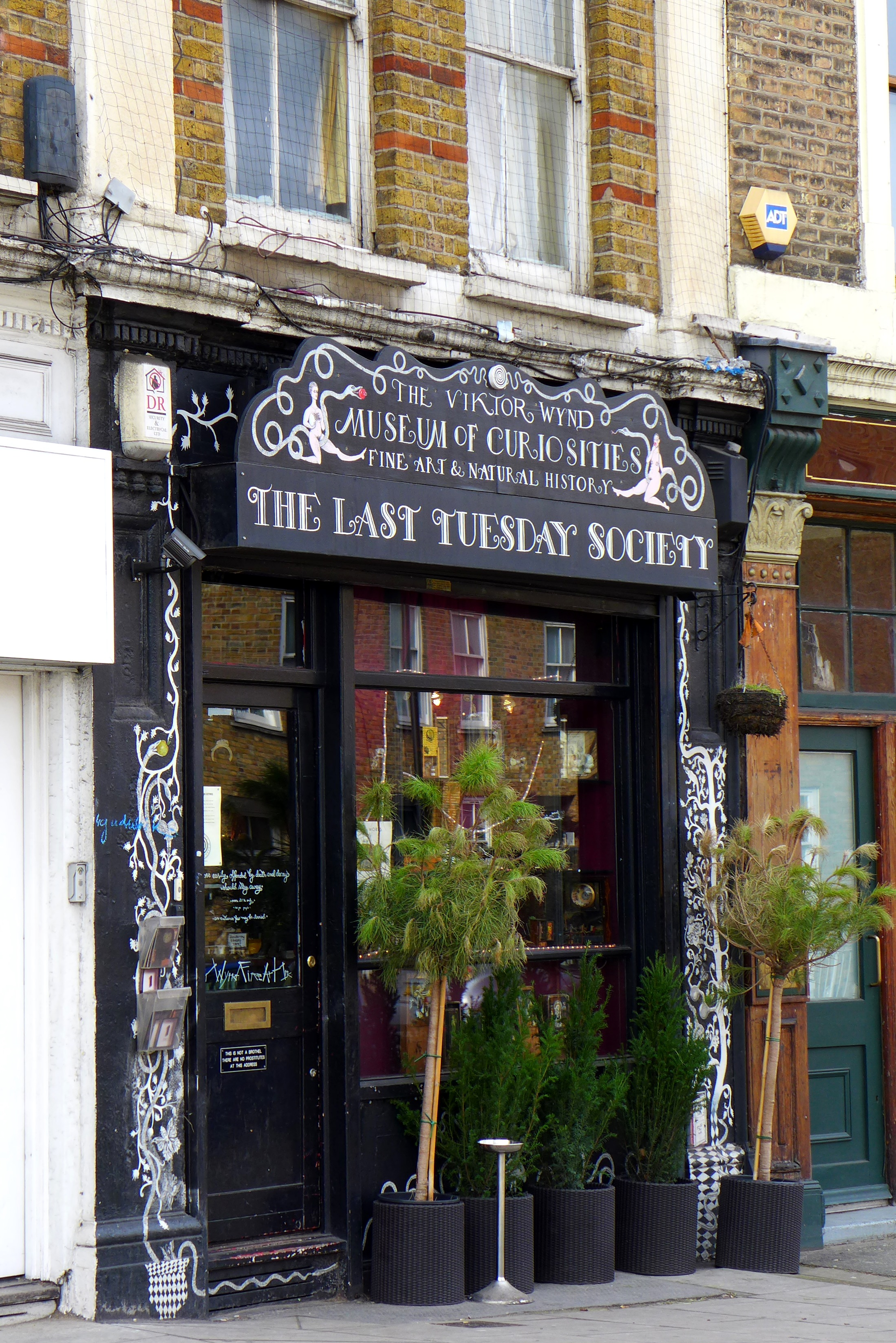
The Viktor Wynd Museum of Curiosities, Fine Art & Natural History near the Regents Canal, opened 2015

South of Hackney Central railway station Mare Street slices through Hackney's 'cultural quarter' of Town Hall Square. Its north side is dominated by Frank Matcham's Grade II* listed 1901 Hackney Empire music hall, on whose stage appeared Charles Chaplin and Marie Lloyd – who lived in nearby Graham Road. On the west side of Town Hall Square is the 1934–1937 Grade II Hackney Town Hall in Portland Stone, fronted by an open space created when its predecessor, the Hackney Vestry Hall of 1860 was demolished. A new town hall complex is being constructed behind the existing building. Opposite on the East side, is the 2001 refurbishment of the Central Library and Methodist Hall, combined to form the Ocean Music Venue.

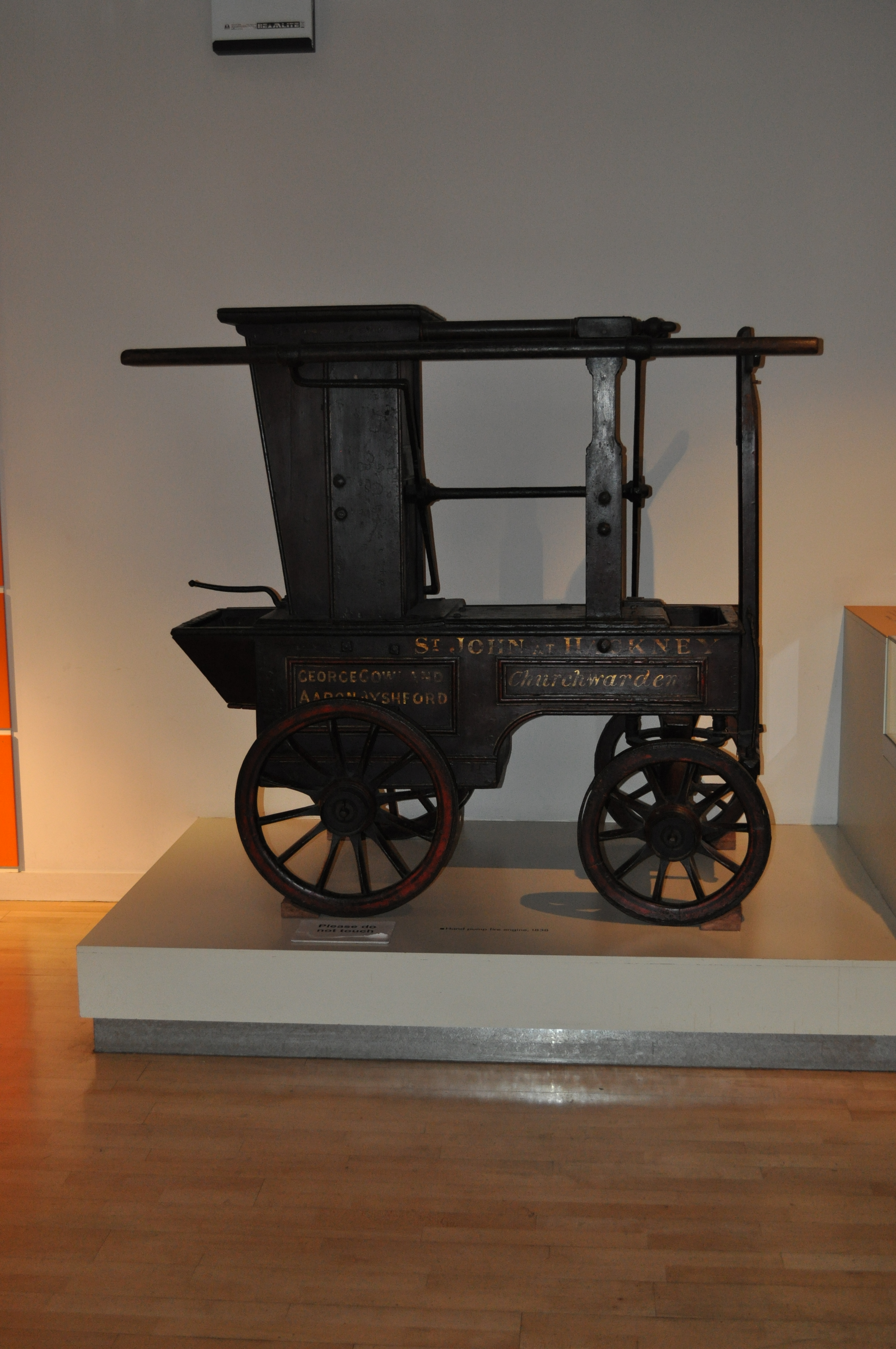
The Hackney Museum contains Hackney's first fire engine.

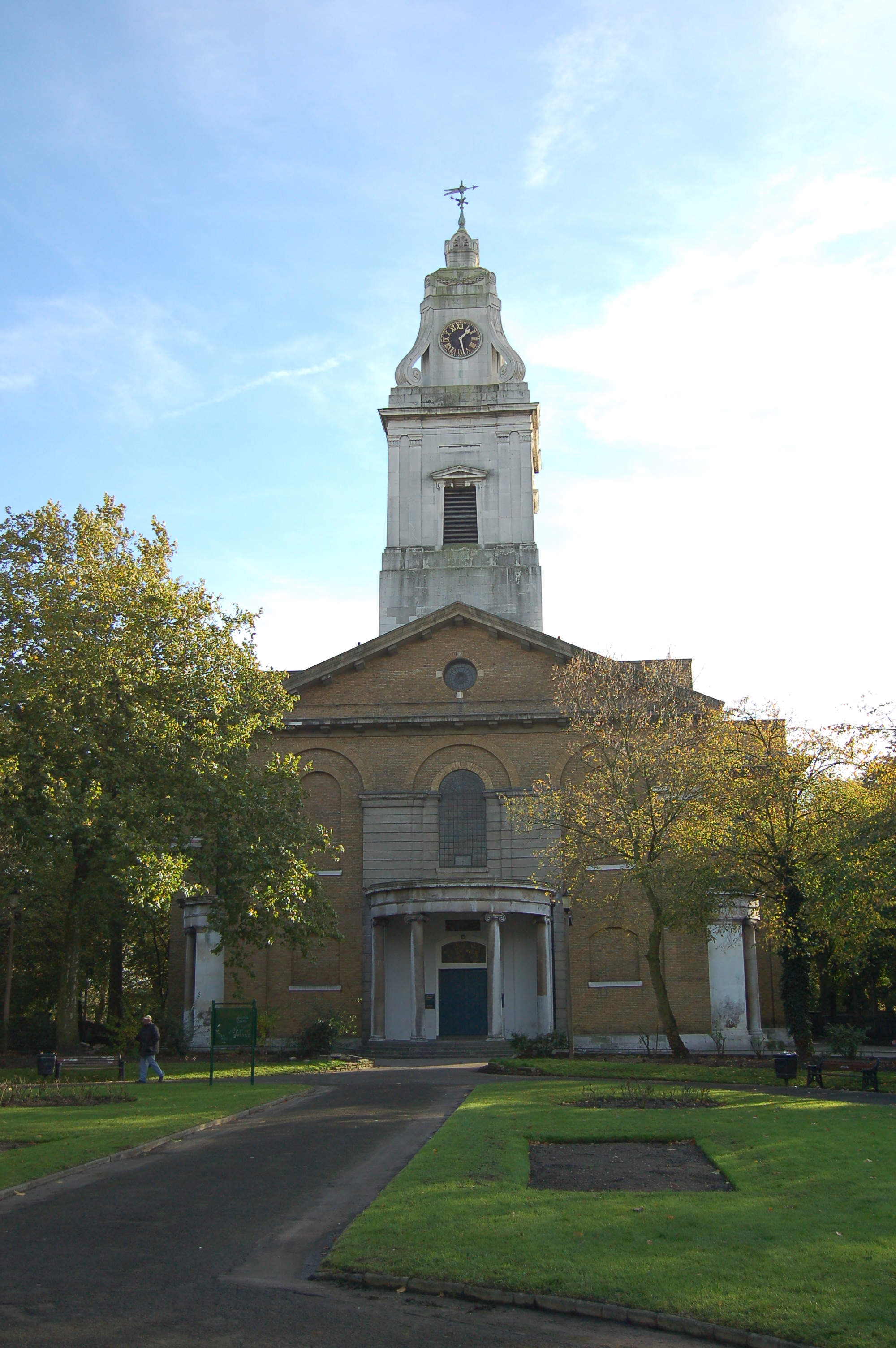
Church of St John-at-Hackney

The square is completed by the 2002 Learning and Technology Centre. This houses the new Hackney Central Library, the Hackney Archive, the local museum and the offices of the Hackney Learning Trust.

North of the railway bridge, Mare Street continues as The Narroway (originally known as Church Street). By St Augustine's Tower, a Grade I landmark, is the 'Old Town Hall' built to serve the Parish of Hackney in 1802. It is now a betting shop. To the east are St Johns' Church Gardens. In 2009, they were awarded Heritage Green Flag status. Within the gardens stands the Church of St John-at-Hackney (built 1792).

The Viktor Wynd Museum of Curiosities, Fine Art & Natural History opened in 2015, the museum and bar is situated in a former call centre on Mare Street that is run by Viktor Wynd, which is a part of the Last Tuesday Society and funded by Kickstarter. Its gallery includes classic curiosities such as hairballs, Sebastian Horsley nails from his crucifixion and drawings and archive material to do with Stephen Tennant, a collection of human remains including shrunken heads, dead babies in bottles and parts of pickled prostitutes, as well as condoms used by the Rolling Stones and tribal art, in among an art collection which spans several centuries.

The Ash Grove bus depot was built by London Buses in 1981 as part of a program to build more garages. The roof is of unusual design, carried by ten 35-ton triangular trusses supported on reinforced concrete columns, and was developed at a cost of £3.5 million. Ash Grove has also been used at various times as part of the London Transport Museum to house stored vehicles.

== Transport ==
=== Rail ===
The area is 2 miles (3.2 km) north-east of the City of London with frequent trains from Hackney Downs railway station to Liverpool Street. Hackney Central railway station is a London Overground station with westbound trains to Richmond and Clapham Junction via Dalston Junction, and eastbound trains to Stratford via Homerton.

=== Buses ===
London bus routes 30, 38, 55, 106, 236, 242, 253, 254, 276, 277, 394, N38, N55, N242, N253, N277 and W15 serve Hackney Central. Route N277 also serves here when the 277 route was withdrawn between Dalston and Highbury Corner and the N277 was retained.

== Economy ==
The Narrow Way (Church Street) remains a busy shopping area, and there is a large Tesco supermarket in nearby Morning Lane (Money Lane). This international store group was founded in Hackney, from a market stall in Well Street market in 1919. A planning application for a multi-storey shopping centre (with parking beneath, and housing above) on the Hackney Tesco site was refused permission in 2010, and the future of the site remains uncertain. A former Burberry factory building is also located off Morning Lane, with a 'factory outlet' that is considered to be Hackney's most visited tourist attraction. This site is currently being redeveloped, in two phases, that will see the retention of the showroom, but add housing above.

The primary local employers are the council and the NHS at Homerton University Hospital; there are also two London Transport garages, one at the foot of the Narroway, and another about 1 mile south at Ash Grove. Between Ash Grove and London Fields there is a small industrial estate.

== Education ==
Schools in the area include The Urswick School (formerly known as Hackney Free and Parochial Church of England Secondary School) and BSix Sixth Form College.

== See also ==
- Metropolitan Borough of Hackney (1900–1965)
- Hackney carriage
- Hackney Central Parliamentary constituency (1885–1950, 1955–1983)
