= Mare Street =

Street in Hackney, London

Coordinates: 51°32′48.63″N 0°3′18.07″W

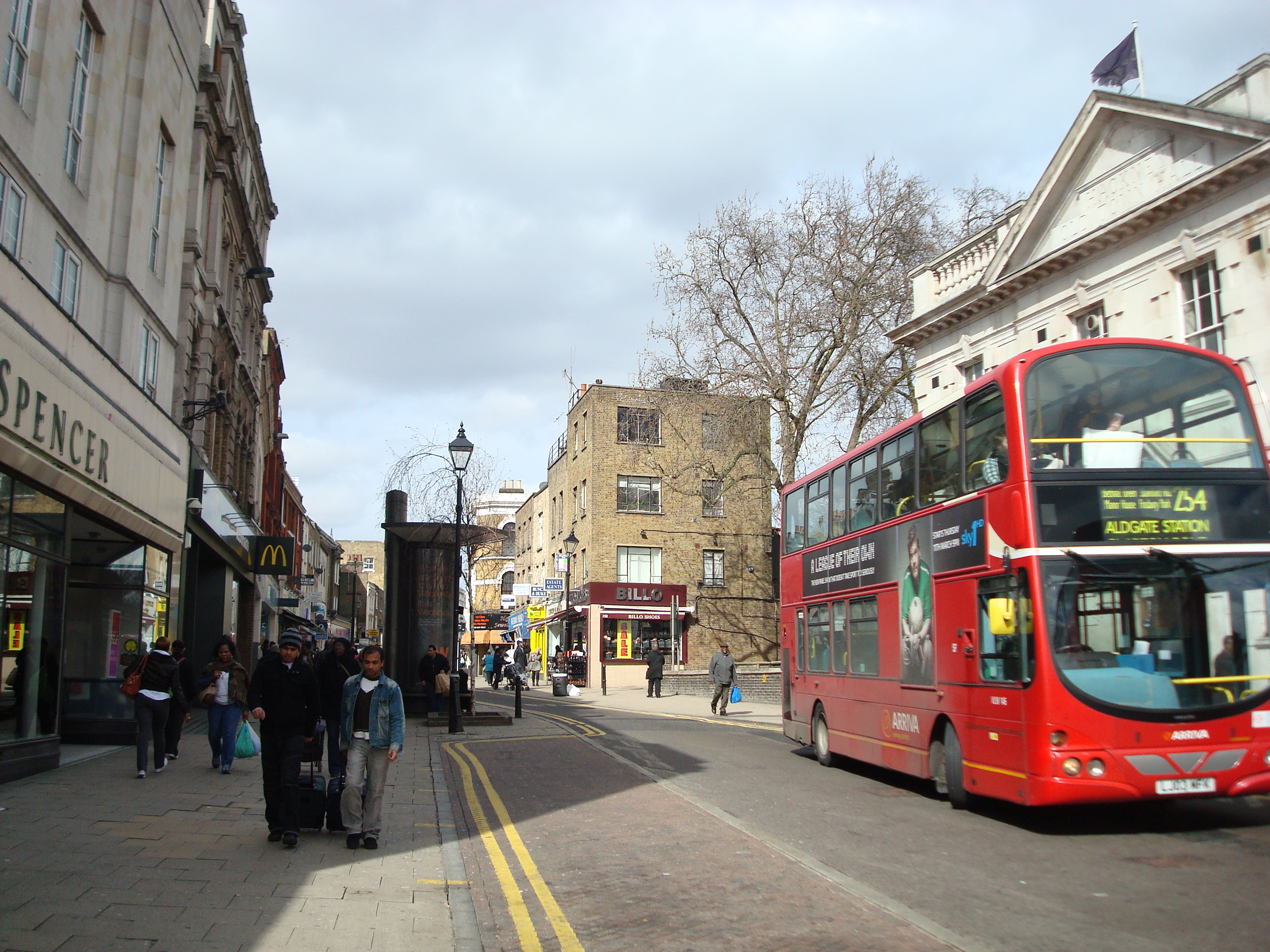
An Arriva London bus passes a branch of Marks & Spencer

Mare Street is a street in the London Borough of Hackney. It has existed since the 15th century, when it was one of the first roads at the centre of the parish. It was then known as Merestret. The word mere was either the Old English mǣre meaning a boundary — referring to the boundary with the parish of Stepney — or mere, a large pond which was fed by Hackney Brook.

== Location ==
Mare Street runs north–south through the centre of Hackney. It starts in Lower Clapton at the junction of Dalston Lane with the Lower Clapton Road and runs south to the Regent's Canal at Bethnal Green. The northernmost section is a largely traffic-free shopping street, known as The Narroway or Narrow Way.

South of the North London Line at Hackney Central railway station, Mare Street follows the A107 to the canal in Bethnal Green, where it becomes the Cambridge Heath Road at the junction with Vyner Street.

== History ==
Mare Street was established by 1593 when the Flying Horse Inn was a staging post for travellers. By 1720, it was the most populous part of Hackney.

In the 18th century, St Thomas’ Hospital was developed on Mare Street, followed by a Congregational chapel. The Great Eastern Railway came to Mare Street in 1872, bringing more residential development, as well as institutions including Morley Hall, later the Electric Cinema, Lady Eleanor Holles School (on the site later used by Cordwainers College) and St Joseph's hospice.

After the First World War, the area became more industrial, and after World War II, a mixture of bomb damage and slum clearance led to building of housing estates and Hackney Technical College.

In 1945, the Cordwainers' College moved from Clerkenwell to 182 Mare Street (formerly Lady Holles's School and the Dalston county school).

Mary Wollstonecraft, author of A Vindication of the Rights of Woman, pioneer of women's rights and mother of Mary Shelley, lived at what is now 373–375 Mare Street in 1784.

== Notable buildings ==
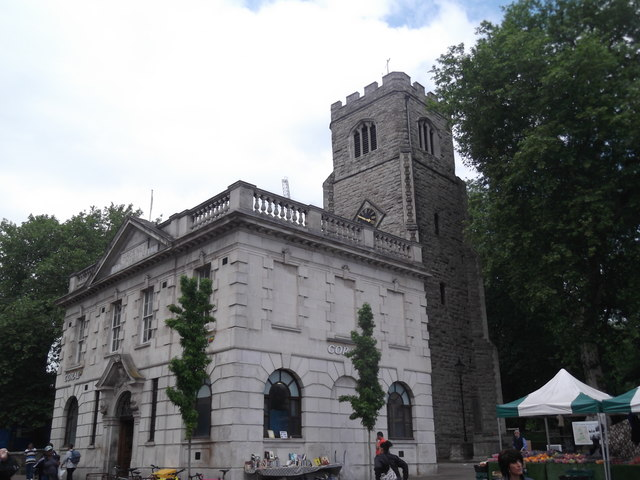
Hackney Old Town Hall and St Augustine's Tower

The 14th century St Augustine's Tower on the Narroway, is a remnant of Hackney parish's medieval church which was replaced by the present St. John at Hackney church in 1797. It is situated next to the Old Town Hall which has hosted a bank, a betting shop, a pub and is now home to a Gail's Bakery.

The Hackney Empire is at 291 Mare Street. Built by Frank Matcham in 1901 as a music hall, it was later used as a television studio and a bingo hall, before reopening as a theatre in 1986.

Next to the Hackney Empire is Hackney Town Hall, a stone-faced 1930s art deco building, set back from Mare Street with a landscaped forecourt.

The London College of Fashion is at 182 Mare Street, having incorporated the former Cordwainers' College.

The Ash Grove bus garage is at Mare Street, being operated only by Stagecoach London.

The Viktor Wynd Museum of Curiosities, Fine Art & Natural History is located in a former call center on Mare Street.

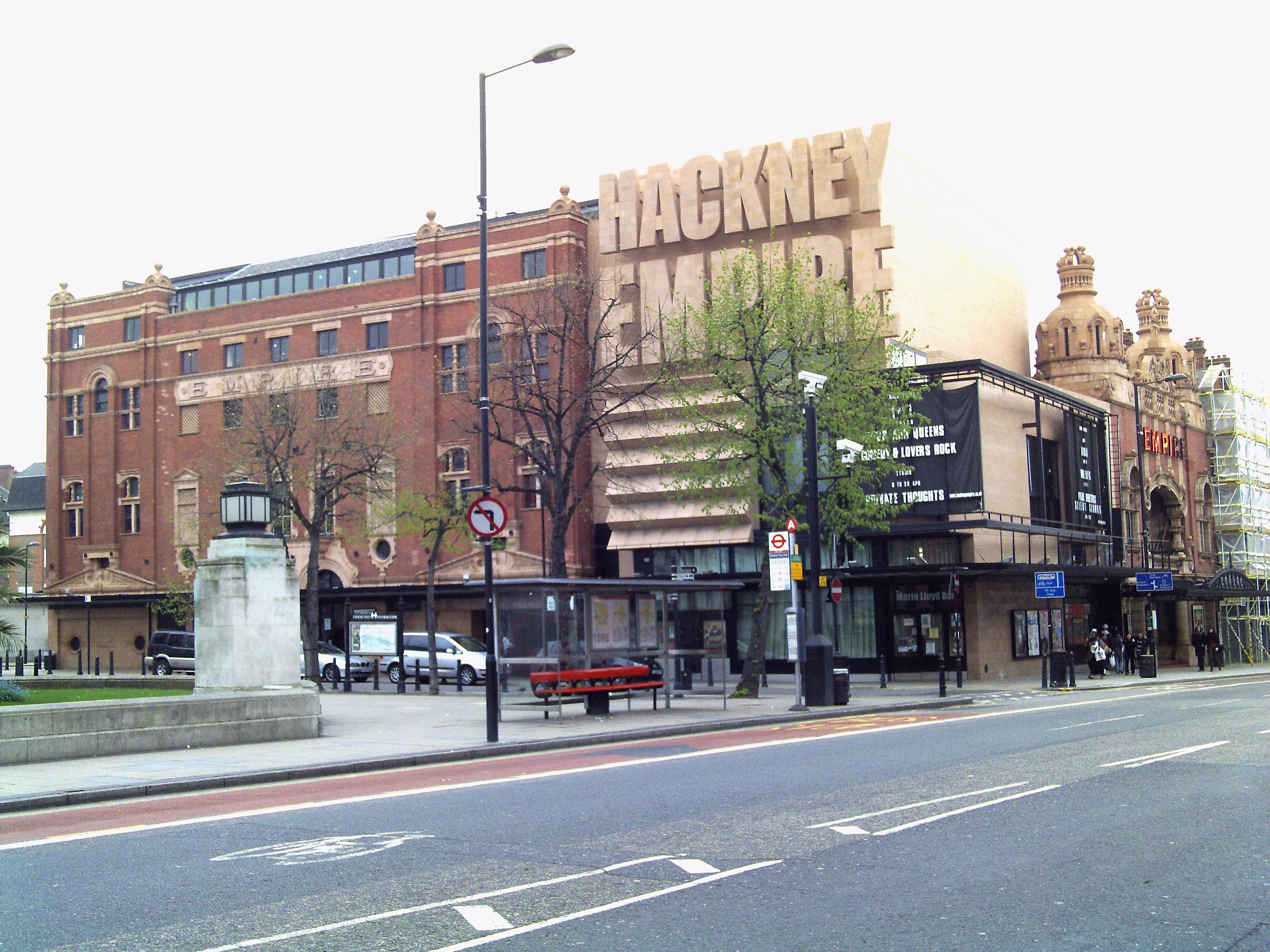
The Hackney Empire is a prominent Victorian music hall.

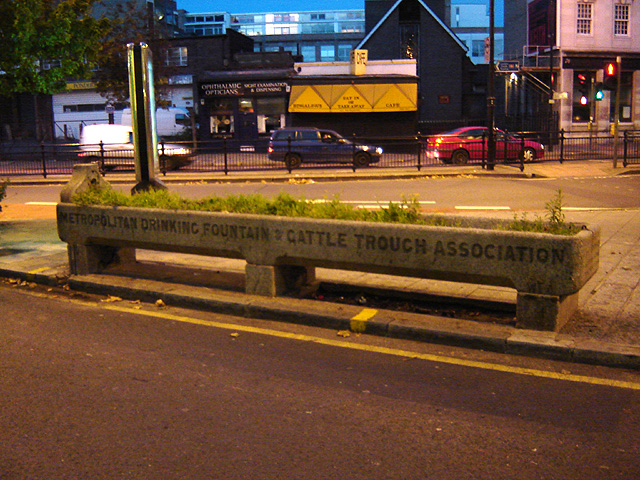
A drinking trough provided by the Metropolitan Drinking Fountain and Cattle Trough Association
