= The House of Fairy Tales (London) =

Children's arts charity in London, England

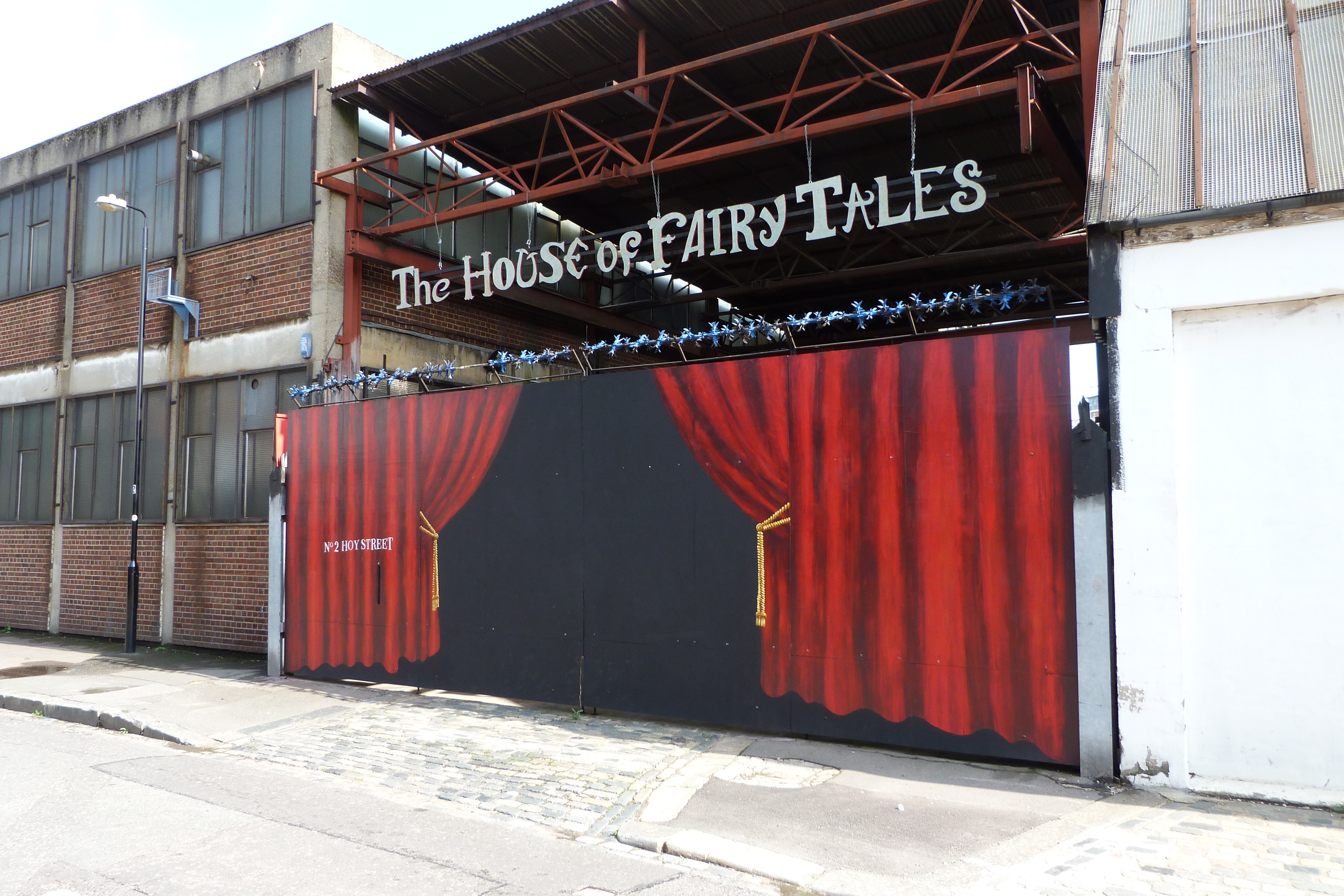
House of Fairy Tales, East London

The House of Fairy Tales is a children's arts charity based in London, England. The House of Fairy Tales brings together artists, performers, actors, writers and philosophers to deliver theatrical events, guides and exhibitions. The House of Fairy Tales is a registered charity and holds the registration number 1140334 in England and Wales.

== History ==
The charity was established by YBA Gavin Turk and partner Deborah Curtis in 2008.

== Activity ==
The House of Fairy Tales activities and events include:

- “travelling art circus” live events in partnership with festivals and local authorities
- educational family guides to locations of interest in partnership with galleries and institutions
- creative learning workshops and education packs in partnership with schools and institutions
- interactive exhibitions.

The House of Fairy Tales activities and events attract artists and media personalities such as Sir Peter Blake, Turner Prize winner Rachel Whiteread, Cornelia Parker, Vivienne Westwood, Jarvis Cocker and Alex James of Blur, who act as ambassadors for the charity’s work.

=== Past events ===
The House of Fairy Tales has delivered events, activities, exhibitions and family guides for: Camp Bestival, Port Elliot Literary Festival, Glastonbury Festival, Vintage at Goodwood, Apple Cart Festival, Latitude Festival, Barbican Centre, Mayor's Thames Festival, Tate Modern, Whitechapel Gallery, National Trust, Selfridges, The New Art Gallery Walsall, The Millennium Gallery (St. Ives), Newlyn Art Gallery, Salisbury Arts Centre, Saatchi Gallery, Royal Horticultural Society, Viktor Wynd Fine Art Inc.
