= Clapton Square =

Garden square in Lower Clapton, London

Coordinates: 51°33′2″N 0°3′14″W

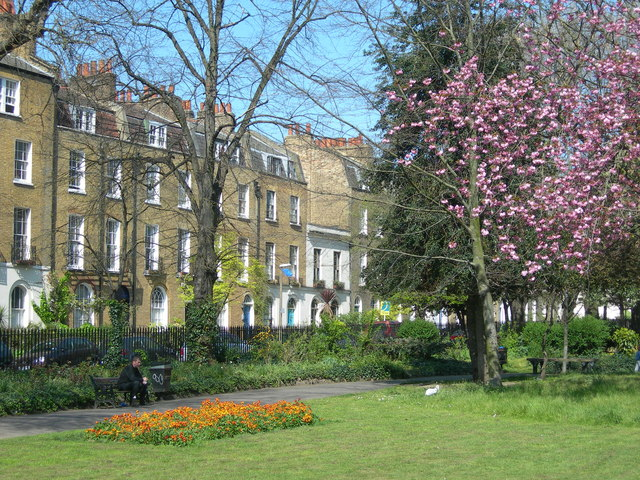
Clapton Square and surrounding houses

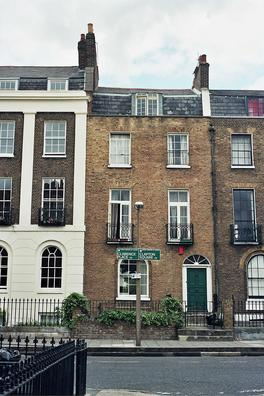
View of north side

Clapton Square is the second largest garden square in the London Borough of Hackney, located in Lower Clapton, Clapton. It is lined by buildings on three sides. Its Conservation Area designated in 1969 – extended in 1991 and 2000 – takes in a larger green space separated by a stretch of open road: St John's Gardens. Those gardens have the tallest and largest building visible from all parts of the square's garden, the Church of St John-at-Hackney, rebuilt in 1792-97 which contains older monuments. Two sides of the square are lined with tall, partly stone-dressed, classical, Georgian terraced houses.

== Overview ==
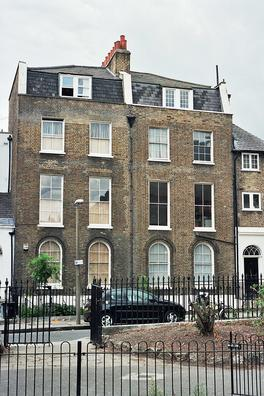
View of a side of the square showing the railings to its large public garden which the Victoria County History states are original.

The inside of the square is a green with shrubs, trees and historic stone ornaments. Many buildings around the square are five-storey houses with leaded fanlights, pilasters and upper cornices (white ledges) and porticos. The houses have sash windows, ornamental cast-iron balconies, columns and porches. The frontages of some houses are adorned with trained ivy or wisteria. Houses along two sides were replaced in the late 19th century, leaving Georgian houses along the north and west. A rectory was moved here in 2006.

== History and notable residents ==
The square was laid out in 1816 in the fields of the manor of Hackney owned by the Tyssen family, as homes for senior merchants, officers and financial brokers in an upmarket residential square. It has central gardens containing a finely restored drinking fountain donated to Hackney residents by Howard Morley in 1894.

19th century Jewish writer Grace Aguilar lived in the square. Russian revolutionary Vladimir Ilyich Ulyanov (Lenin) visited, around 1905, his friend Theodore Rothstein who resided in the square.

The east side of the square was destroyed in the London Blitz of World War II and rebuilt, to emulate as it was, at the start of the next century.

Neighbouring comparable architecture

North-east of the square is Holly Villas in Clapton Passage, a short terrace of multi-storey bay-windowed Victorian villas built in 1882.

Similar grand terraces to those in Clapton Square are on the south side of adjoining Sutton Place.

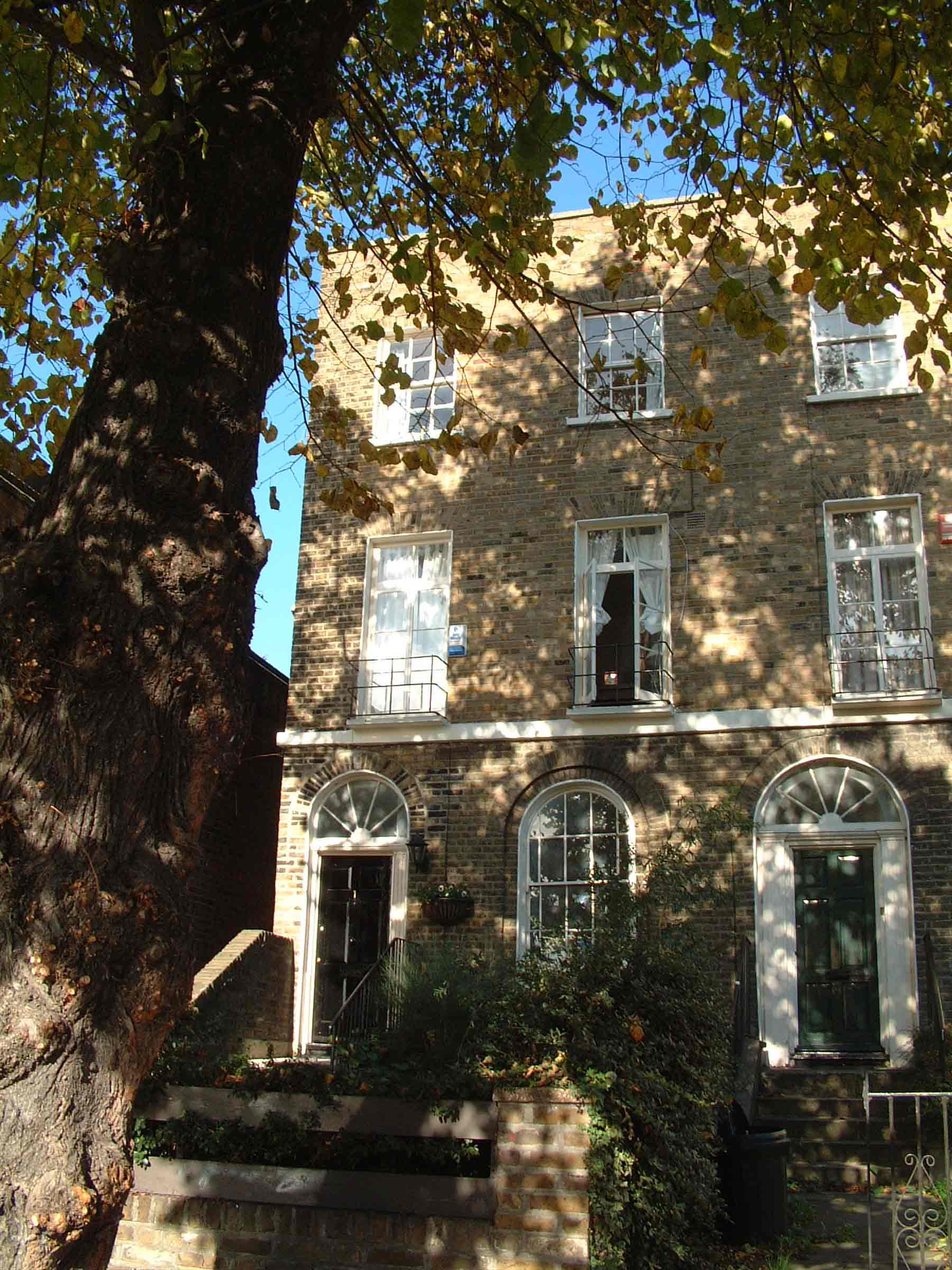
Clarence Place

Resident and eminent scientist Joseph Priestley, a fellow of the Royal Society wrote:

On the whole I spent my life more happily at Hackney than I had ever done before

He lived at the house (demolished in 1880) on the corner of the Passage and Lower Clapton Road, in the 1790s. A mob had hounded him out of his house and laboratory in Birmingham who opposed his support for the French Revolution. He was invited to come to Hackney to take up the post of Unitarian Minister at the Old Gravel Pit Chapel where he had many friends amongst the Hackney Dissenters. A plaque marks the site of his house above the existing corner building in Lower Clapton Road. He emigrated to America in 1794 fearing a repeat of his family's persecution.

In a cottage behind Priestley's house, in the closing years of the 18th century, lived a Huguenot widow, Louisa Perina Courtauld, a designer of gold plate who married a silversmith. Their son, Samuel Courtauld (junior), founded the Courtauld dynasty of silk and artificial fibre manufacturers and a descendant founded the Courtauld Institute now in Somerset House.

5 Clapton Square - home of Thomas Briggs, chief clerk of Robarts, Curtis Bank, Britain's first railway murder victim on 9 July 1864 (Mr Biggs Hat, Kate Colqhhoun, ISBN 9780349123592 2011)

== Conservation Area ==
Clapton Square is near the centre of the London Borough of Hackney its south side has long been part of a kink in north–south Lower Clapton Road where the road took over from today's pedestrianised north end of Mare Street. East is Homerton and west is Dalston. Its land is mid-elevation. Most is on the deep Hackney gravels geological terrace. The Conservation Area spans parts of four electoral wards, and has approximately 250 homes.

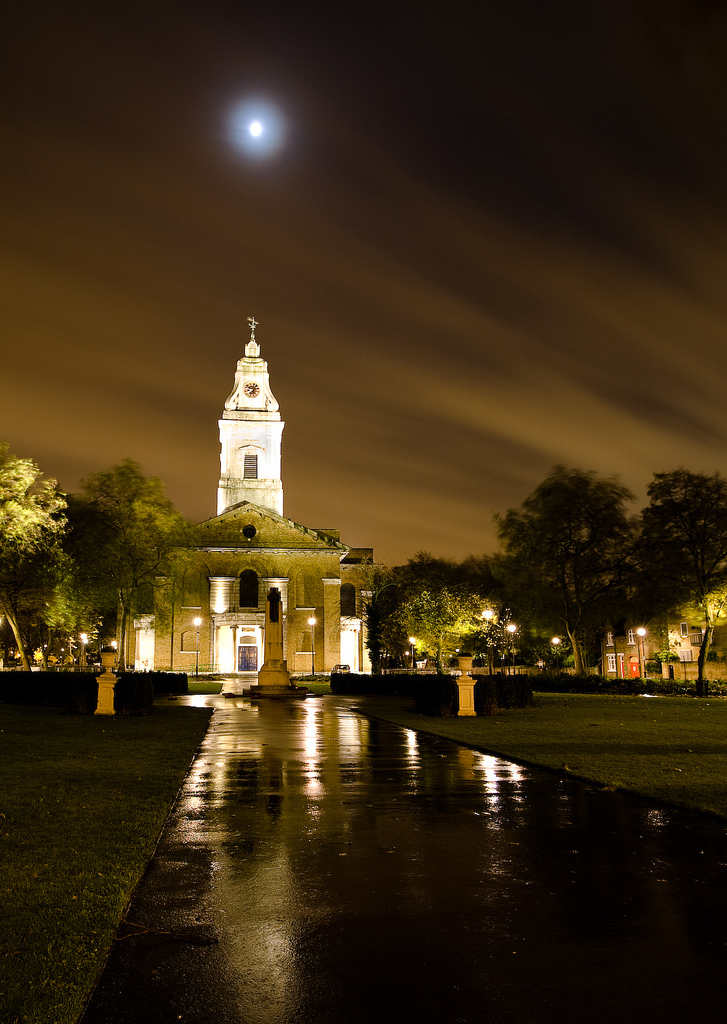
Illuminated church to the south of the square itself.

The Conservation Area contains two significant open spaces: Clapton Square and across the open south side the Churchyard of St. John-at-Hackney, known as St. John's Gardens, an L-shaped large green with permanent footpaths. The continuous bypass of the Lower Clapton Road which, open, forms the south side of the square (a hundred metres east turning into Mare Street, a pedestrianised shopping precinct leading to the nearest station) makes the greens, separate elongated and diversely of amenity value — to mid-rise apartments, Victorian villas, and grand classical homes on the north side of Hackney Central as well as Lower Clapton many of which have been subdivided into luxurious apartments.

== Local history ==
Hackney was a favourite residence of wealthy Londoners from the Middle Ages until the 19th century and the largest Middlesex parish included in the County of London (created 1889). Near the south-western corner it was about 1,800 metres north of the bar (gate) of London at Bishopsgate. From here a section of Ermine Street under various names led north for 3,800 metres to enter Tottenham at Stamford Hill. For part of its length, as Stoke Newington Road and High Street, it formed Hackney's western boundary. The parish stretched eastward about 3,600 metres to Temple Mills on the river Lea. Besides Hackney village, the parish included Dalston, Shacklewell, Stamford Hill, Upper and Lower Clapton, Homerton, Hackney Wick, and parts of Stoke Newington village and Kingsland. The area of the parish was estimated with some accuracy at 3,300 acres (13 km^{2}) in 1765 and 1831.

The Great Plague of London and the Great Fire of London the following year, 1666, commended less densely populated land immediately around the city to those conducting high level business in the city. Daniel Defoe, who lived in the border-village of Stoke Newington, described Hackney in the 1720s as comprising "twelve hamlets" and "having so many rich citizens that it contained nearly a hundred coaches". Hackney House was put up for the governor of the Bank of England, Stamp Brooksbank (d. 1756). An earlier neighbour was a prominent expander of (the Honourable) East India Company.

The London Building Act 1774 (14 Geo. 3. c. 78) was applied for many decades and presented a persuasive model into the 20th century. Dubbed the Black Act among some landlords because of its heavy impositions, it was passed to mitigate fire risk. It specified all houses to be of brick, windows recessed and with roofs of slate which do not overhang.

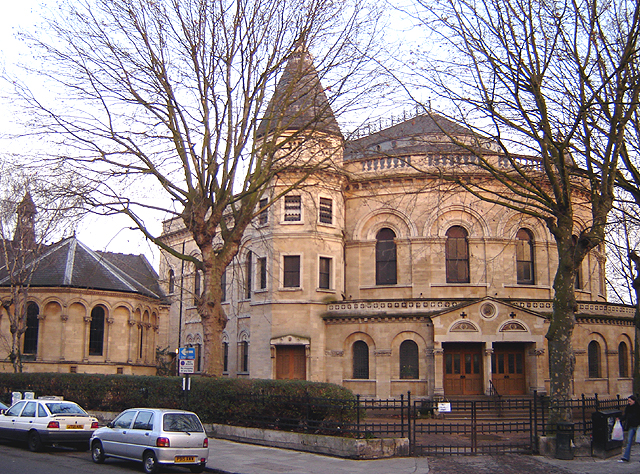
The High Victorian Round Chapel

Listed buildings around the square that are local landmarks are the medieval St Augustine's Tower, the Tudor period Sutton House, the neo-classical Church of St John-at-Hackney, and the High Victorian Round Chapel, Lower Clapton.
