= Henry Rowe (lord mayor) =

Former Lord Mayor of London

Sir Henry Rowe (died 12 November 1612) was an English merchant who was Lord Mayor of London in 1607.

Rowe was the son of Sir Thomas Rowe who was Lord Mayor from 1568 to 1569 and grandson of Sir John Gresham, Lord Mayor from 1547 to 1548.

He was a city of London merchant and a member of the Worshipful Company of Mercers. On 22 July 1596, he was elected an alderman of the City of London for Coleman Street ward. He was auditor for the City in 1596 and was Sheriff of London from 1597 to 1598. In 1599 he was Master of the Mercers Company. He was knighted on 26 July 1603. In 1607, he was elected Lord Mayor of London. He was Master of the Mercers Company in 1608 and became alderman for Cornhill ward in 1611.

In December 1607, as Lord Mayor, Rowe forwarded a petition to the Privy Council on behalf of merchants and makers of "Vardyngales (farthingales), Boddyes, and Sleeves for women" that an import duty should not be levied on "whalebone-fins" or baleen.

He married Susan Keighlie [who + Jan 1611] in St. Mary Woolchurch Haw, London on 13 Dec 1573 [IGI & Middlesex Pedigrees, p. 8] Their daughter, also called Susan, married first Alderman William Holliday, and secondly Robert Rich, 2nd Earl of Warwick.

Sir Henry and Lady Rowe were buried in a memorial chapel in the church of St John, Hackney. The chapel was demolished in 1894, when the churchyard (by then closed to burials) was converted to a public garden.

Civic offices
Preceded by John Watts	Lord Mayor of the City of London; 1607	Succeeded by Sir Humphrey Weld
