= Christopher Urswick =

English priest (1448–1522)

Christopher Urswick (1448 – 24 March 1522) was a priest and confessor of Margaret Beaufort. He was Rector of Puttenham, Hertfordshire, and later Dean of Windsor. Urswick is thought to have acted as a go-between in the plotting to place her son Henry VII of England on the throne.

== Early life and education ==
Urswick was born at Furness in 1448. His father, John Urswick, and his mother were lay brother and sister of Furness Abbey.

He was educated at Lancaster Royal Grammar School (which was then called 'The Free School at Lancaster'). He was at King's Hall, Cambridge in 1470/1, graduated in 1478/9, and was Warden of King's Hall 1485–1488.

== Career ==
He was Archdeacon of Wilts (1488–1522), Archdeacon of Richmond (1494–1500) and Archdeacon of Norfolk (1500–1522). Circa 1486 he was given the prebend of Chiswick in St Paul's Cathedral. He was also Dean of York from 1488 to 1494, a Canon of St George's Chapel, Windsor from 1492 to 1496 and then Dean of Windsor from 1495 to 1505. He was the Lord Almoner from 1485 to 1495.

He declined the position of Bishop of Norwich in 1498 and was collated Archdeacon of Oxford in 1504.

Amongst his more important positions, Urswick became Rector of the Parish of Hackney in 1502, where he ordered the medieval parish church to be rebuilt. St Augustine's Tower is the only remnant.

== Death ==
Urswick died on 24 March 1522 in Hackney (parish) and was buried in St Augustine's Church, Hackney.

== Commemoration ==
He appears as a minor character in Shakespeare's Richard III.

He built a parish house in Hackney (Urswick House, now demolished), where he lived for a time. He is commemorated in Urswick Road in nearby Homerton.

He founded The Urswick School for 12 poor boys, which was until recently called Hackney Free and Parochial School in Hackney Central. The Urswick Chantry in St George's Chapel, Windsor Castle, commemorates him.
