= The Urswick School =

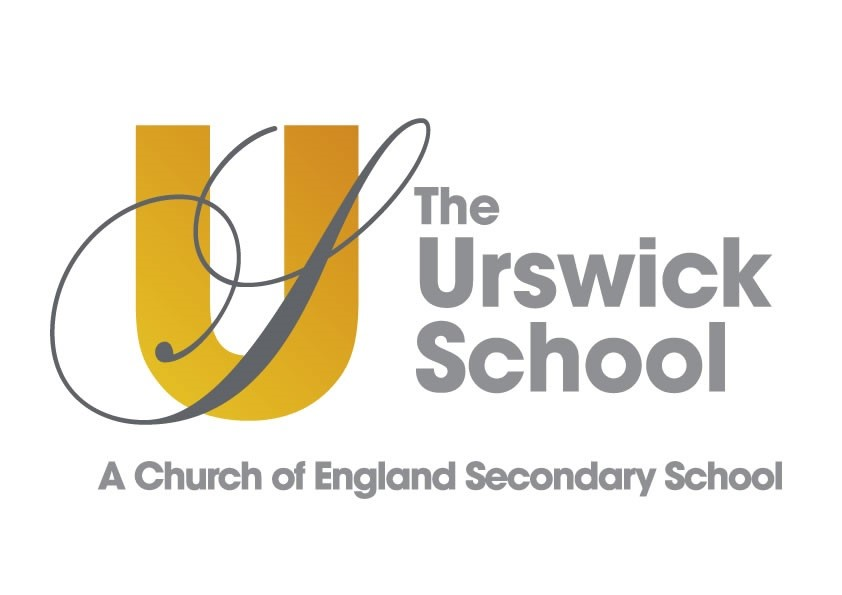
- The Urswick School Logo

Location
- Paragon Road; Hackney; London, E9 6NR; England
- Coordinates: 51.5445°N 0.0527°W

Information
- Type: Voluntary aided school
- Religious affiliation: Church of England
- Established: 1520; 506 years ago
- Local authority: Hackney
- Department for Education URN: 100284 Tables
- Ofsted: Reports
- Headteacher: Dele Rotimi
- Gender: Coeducational
- Age: 11 to 19
- Colour: Grey Yellow Blue ◻️ 🟨 🟦
- Website: http://www.theurswickschool.co.uk/

The Urswick School is a co-educational secondary school and sixth form located in the Hackney Central area of the London Borough of Hackney, London.

The school is named after Revd Christopher Urswick, Rector of Hackney from 1502 to 1522, and a close friend of King Henry VII and his mother, Lady Margaret Beaufort, a great benefactress of learning.

== History ==
Established in 1520 as Hackney Free School, in 1722, it joined with a parochial charity school to form Hackney Free and Parochial School. The school moved to its present location after 1856., and was significantly rebuilt and expanded as part of the Building Schools for the Future program, being renamed in 2011 as The Urswick School.

A voluntary aided school administered by Hackney London Borough Council and the Church of England Diocese of London, the Urswick School offers GCSEs, BTECs and ASDAN awards as programmes of study for pupils, and the sixth form can study a range of A-levels and further BTECs and ASDAN awards.

In 2021, The Guardian reported that the Urswick School is "the most disadvantaged secondary school in London and the fifth most disadvantaged in England". The school provides free school meals to all pupils.

In 2020, the governing body of the school settled out of court for repeatedly excluding a student because of her Afro hairstyle. They paid damages of £8,500. The school has entered into a legally binding agreement about hair policies with the Equality and Human Rights Commission.

The Urswick School is also partnered with University College London for their Sixth Form and the secondary school.

== See also ==
- Archdeacon of Hackney
- Haberdashers' Company
