= St Augustine's Tower, Hackney =

Coordinates: 51°32′51.98″N 00°03′17.08″W

St. Augustine's Tower Hackney
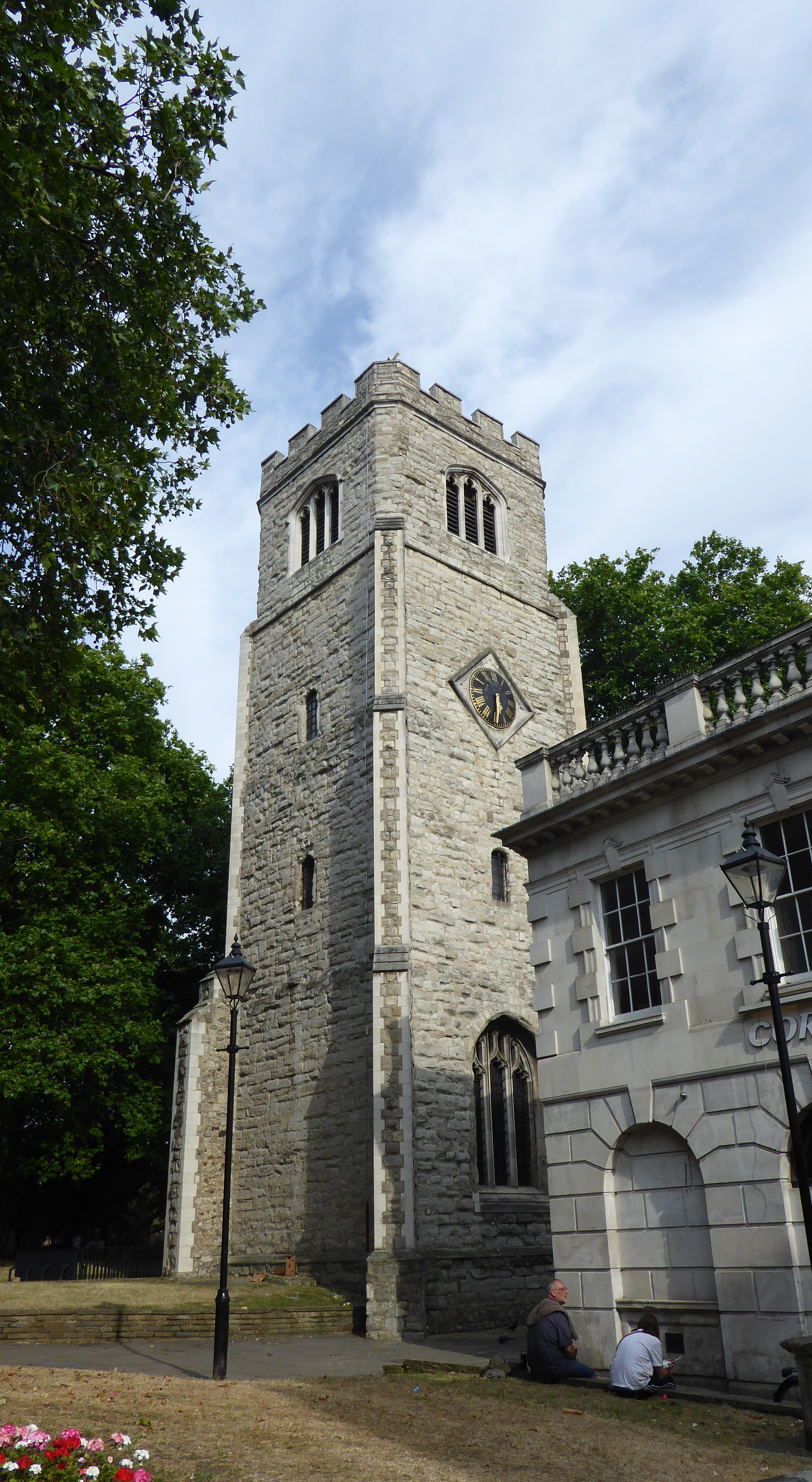
- Northwest view of the tower, the only part of the original church remaining and Hackney's oldest building.
- St. Augustine's Tower Hackney
- Location: London Borough of Hackney
- Country: England
- Denomination: Church of England

History
- Founded: 1275 (first mentioned)
- Founder: Knights of St John

Architecture
- Closed: 1789
- Demolished: 1798 (church)

Administration
- Diocese: London
- Parish: Hackney

St Augustine's Tower stands in St John's Church Gardens, in central Hackney, in the London Borough of Hackney, just off the southern end of the Narrow Way (formerly Church Street). It is all that remains of the early 16th-century parish church of Hackney of St Augustine, which replaced the 13th-century medieval church founded by the Knights of St John. The Tower comprises four stages beneath a restored parapet with diagonal buttressing. A fine working 16th-century turret clock has remained on the third floor of the Tower since at least 1608. The Tower and contents are Grade I listed.

The Tower is seen as a symbol for Hackney, and is represented in the coat of arms of the London Borough of Hackney. During the First World War, it appeared on the cap-badge of the 10th (Hackney) Battalions of the London Regiment, together with the Metropolitan Borough of Hackney motto Justitia Turris Nostra, Latin for Justice is our tower.

== St Augustine's Church ==
=== History ===
The parish church of Hackney became a sinecure rectory in 1275. This meant there was a vicar and a rector representing the parish, both positions being in the gift of the Bishop of London. The church served the entire area of the parish of Hackney until the parish was divided into separate ecclesiastical parishes in the 19th century. Hackney remained united for civil purposes until 1965, when the Metropolitan Borough of Hackney merged with Shoreditch and Stoke Newington to become the new London Borough of Hackney.

Many of the position holders were absentee pluralists (i.e. they had other jobs, and Hackney just formed a part of their income). From the 14th century to the 17th century the church was dedicated to St Augustine.

From about 1660, the church was dedicated to St John of Jerusalem, St John the Baptist, and known as St John at Hackney, representing the links of the parish with the Order of St John of Jerusalem.

The church tower was constructed as part of the early 16th-century rebuilding of the church itself, commemorated by the arms of Sir John Heron (d. 1521) carved between each arch of the nave and also placed, with those of the rector Christopher Urswick (d. 1522), in the chancel. Thereafter the church consisted of a chancel, aisled and clerestoryed nave, and south-west tower. The "so-called" Rowe Chapel, properly a mausoleum, was built on the south side of the chancel in 1614 and a vestry was added on the north side. In 1741, the church measured 105 feet (32.0 m) along its north wall and 64 feet (19.5 m) across; the tower bore a vane surmounted by a crown which reached to 118 feet (36.0 m). The walls, with fenestration of c.1500, showed a variety of materials, as they did at the time of the church's demolition, when the exterior presented 'an incomprehensible jumble of dissonant repairs, without a trace of the original building, except the windows of part of it'.

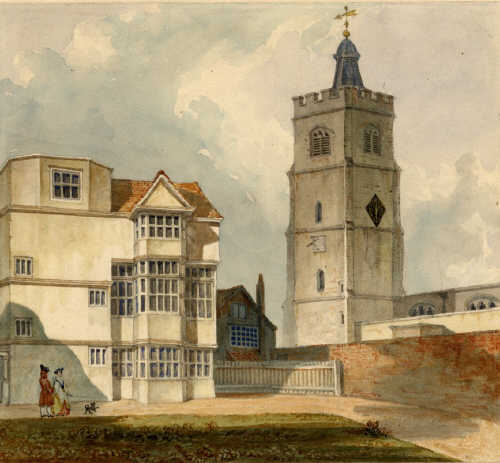
c.1750 View of St Augustine's Tower, showing the (then) adjacent Black and White House

In Tudor times, many members of the court used the church, including Ralph Sadleir (Bryck Place), Thomas Sutton (The Tan House), Thomas Cromwell and the Earl of Northumberland (Brooke House). Lady Lucy Neville (d.1583), daughter-in-law of Queen Catherine Parr, was buried there. Edward de Vere, the 17th Earl of Oxford (12 April 1550 – 24 June 1604) was probably buried here. Samuel Pepys visited the church in 1667, after resting at the local Mermaid Inn.

The constant increasing of Hackney's population meant that galleries were added to the church, and by 1789 it was able to hold a congregation upwards of 1,000. This was still inadequate to the needs of the parish, and on the advice of architect William Blackburn, the vestry petitioned Parliament in 1790 for the church's complete rebuilding at an adjacent site to the north. Blackburn died suddenly in November 1790; James Spiller, a friend of John Soane, was chosen from six architect candidates to replace him as designer of the new church.

The body of the old church was pulled down in 1798, with many of the monuments preserved in the new Church of St John-at-Hackney. The stone was sold as building material. The extent of the original church is marked by four cornerstones to the east of the Tower. The Tower remained to house the eight bells of Hackney; these were finally relocated in the new church in 1854, after the new church tower was underpinned to take the weight.

=== In modern times ===
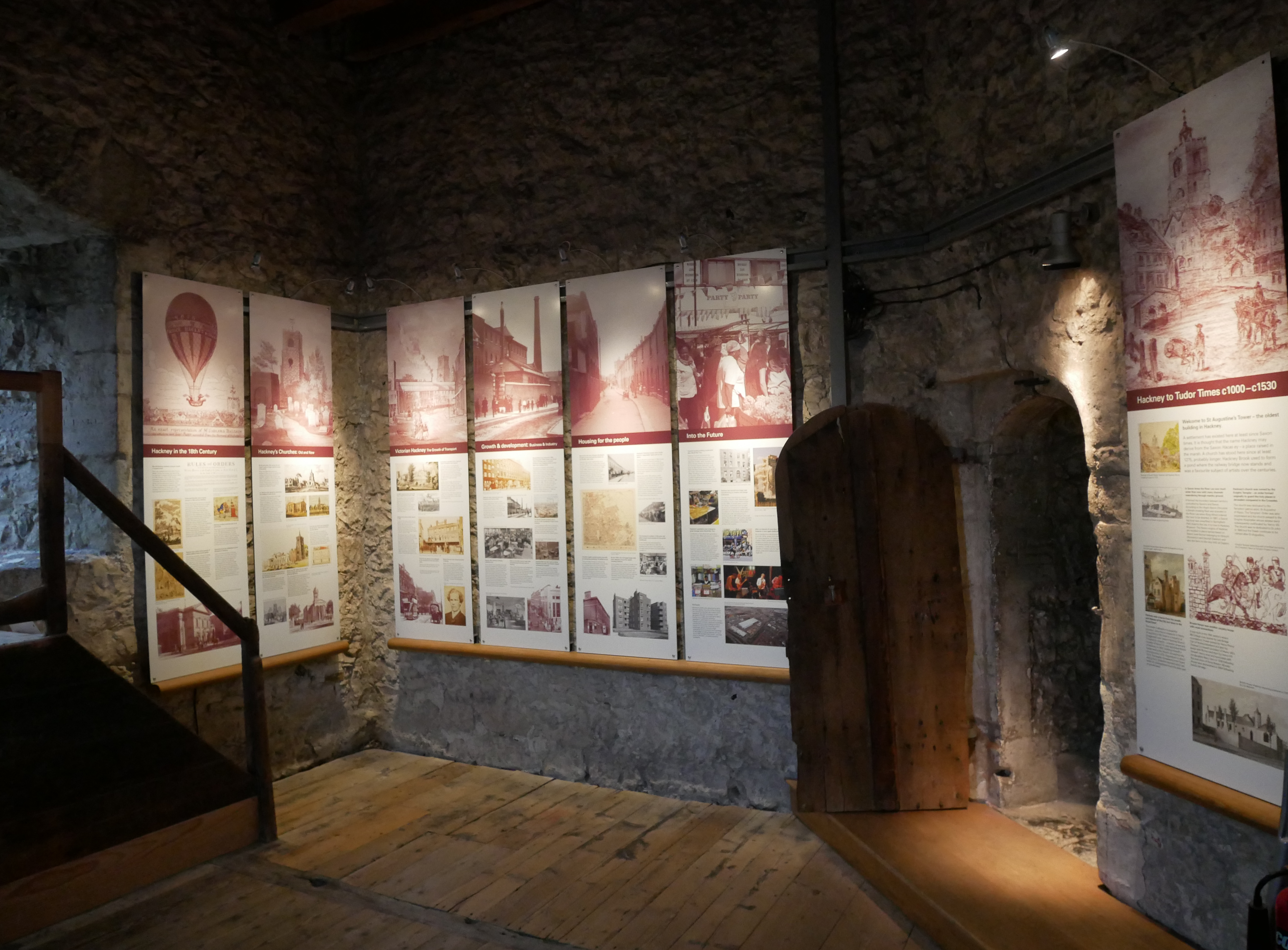
The first floor room in the tower

The Tower was subsequently used as a public mortuary and a tool shed for the gardens of St John. The Metropolitan Borough of Hackney became responsible for the maintenance of the Tower and gardens in 1912. In more recent times, the Tower was made safe in 1983, and has been used for occasional art exhibits. It is normally opened as part of London Open House each year. Since 1990, the Tower has been in the care of the Hackney Historic Buildings Trust. A grant from the Heritage Lottery Fund has made possible repairs and improvements and a permanent exhibition on the history of the Tower, and its church, is now open to the public on the last Sunday of every month. It is now possible to climb its narrow winding stairway to the roof.

St John's Church Gardens, around the Tower and later church, were awarded both a Green Flag Award, and Green Flag Heritage status, in 2008.

== See also ==
- The parish of Hackney
