= SAINT Hackney =

Church in Hackney, London

Coordinates: 51.549224°N 0.053360°W

St John at Hackney Church
- Hackney Church
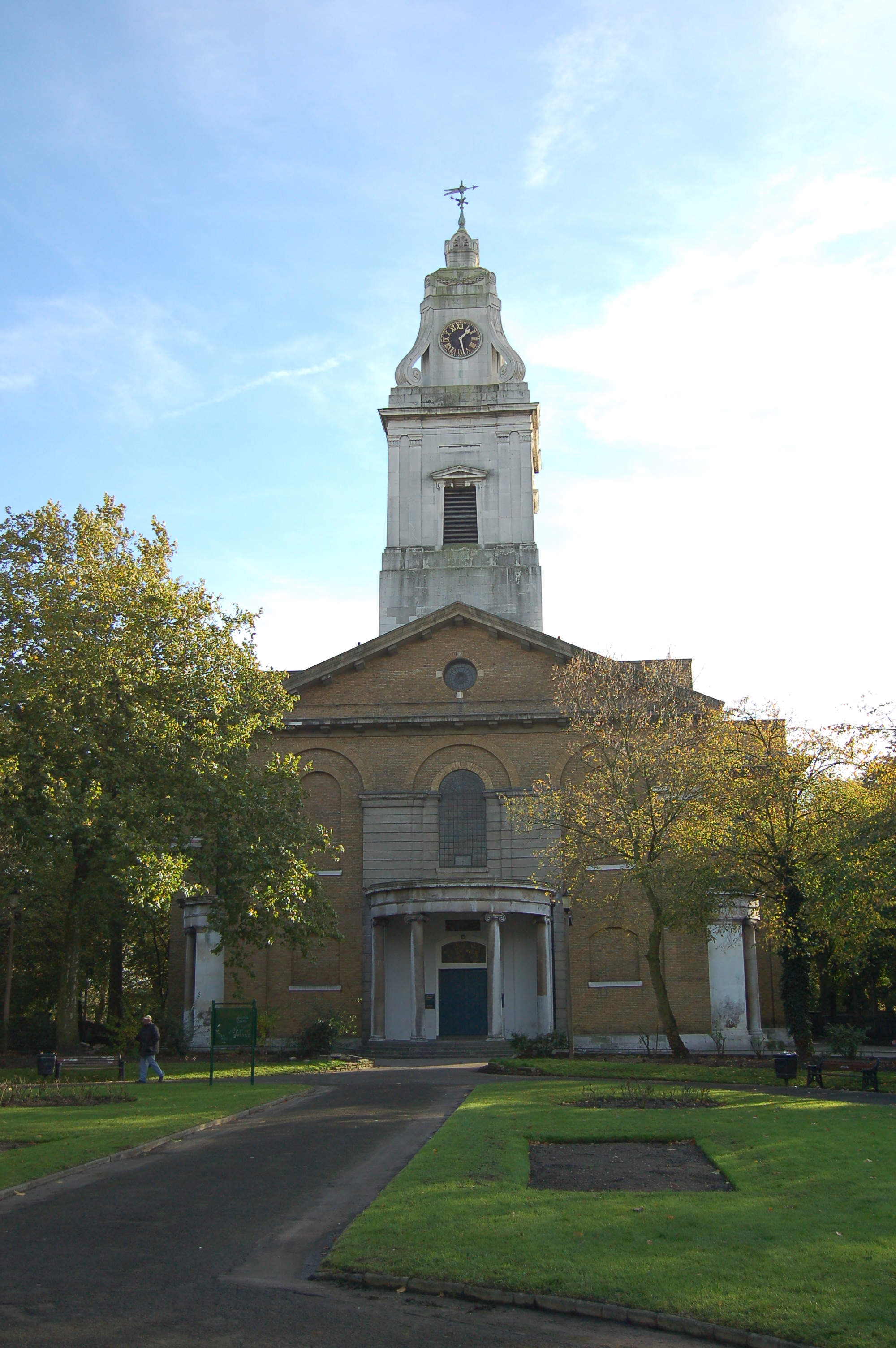
- Church of St John-at-Hackney
- Location: London Borough of Hackney
- Address: St John at Hackney Church, Lower Clapton Road, E5 0PD
- Country: England
- Denomination: Church of England
- Churchmanship: Anglican
- Website: https://saint.church

History
- Status: Parish Church
- Founded: 1275
- Dedicated: 15 July 1797

Architecture
- Functional status: Active
- Architect: James Spiller
- Years built: 1792

Administration
- Diocese: Diocese of London
- Parish: The Parish of Hackney

Clergy
- Bishop(s): The Right Reverend and Right Honourable Dame Sarah Mullally DBE, Bishop of London
- Rector: Rev'd Al Gordon Rev'd Naomi Maxwell

SAINT Hackney is a Grade II* listed Anglican Church in the London Borough of Hackney with a capacity of around 2,000. It was built in 1792 to replace Hackney's medieval parish church, of which St Augustine's Tower remains, at the edge of its churchyard. The church faces north towards Clapton Square, with the nearby Sutton House and Hackney Central station also accessible from the churchyard to the east and south, respectively. As well as a thriving parish church, SAINT has also become known as a notable music venue, playing host to the likes of Coldplay, Ed Sheeran, Emeli Sande, Robbie Williams, Griff and Interpol.

== History ==
The church of St John at Hackney was designed by James Spiller and built in 1792, when demand in the parish of Hackney was in excess of 3,000 parishioners. At an original 3,300 acres (13 km^{2}), at the time the parish was the largest civil parish in Middlesex of those which joined the County of London (created in 1889). The vast, classical, stock-brick building, on a Greek Cross plan, can hold around 2,000 people. The building is Grade II* listed and contains monuments dating from the early sixteenth century, which were transferred from the medieval parish church.

=== St Augustine's Church ===
It is possible that a chapel stood here serving the small, prosperous manor of Hackney north of the City of London, before the Norman Conquest. No records survive of a conceivable chapel before 1275 for a chapelry within the parish of Stepney which covered the 13 km^{2} of Hackney (see St Dunstan's, Stepney). From the 14th century the church was dedicated to Saint Augustine of Hippo until, in 1660, it was rededicated to Saint John the Baptist, thenceforth becoming commonly known as St John at Hackney.

In the 13th century much of the land around Hackney formed part of the possessions of the Knights Templar. When the order was disbanded its possessions were passed to the Order of St. John of Jerusalem, who had a mansion on Church Street. At the Dissolution of the Monasteries their lands passed to the Crown and were parcelled amongst Tudor nobles, including Thomas Sutton and Ralph Sadler.

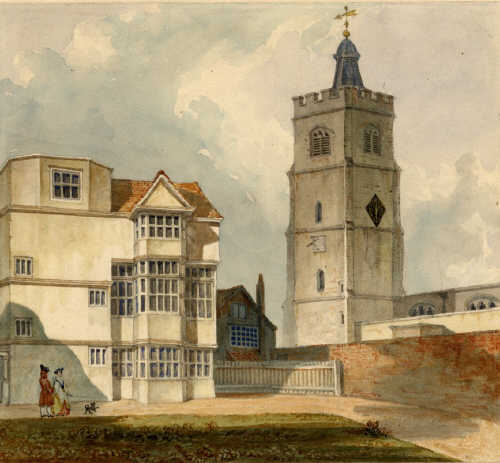
c.1750 View of St Augustine's Tower showing the (then) adjacent Black and White House

=== Growing congregation ===
Hackney's proximity to the City of London and the royal court made it popular with courtiers, city merchants and businessmen. An increasing number of private schools were established in some of the older houses. By 1789 the church capacity, with the addition of numerous galleries, had reached 1,000. This, however, was not enough.

In 1779 a surveyor, Richard Jupp, proposed a rebuilding to increase the capacity to 1,480, but no action was taken. By 1788 a committee found that the population of the parish had increased so much that the church should seek to seat 3,000. The appointed architect, William Blackburn, firmly rejected the idea of building on the old site, advising that a budget of £15,000 be created to buy land on which to construct a new church.

In April 1789 the committee put the matter to a parochial vote, winning their case by 313 votes to 70. A bill was put to the House of Commons. Opponents of the proposal undertook yet another survey with a view to rebuilding on the old site. Finally a compromise was reached; the bill became an act empowering the trustees to acquire, for £875, Church Field which lay to the north-east of the existing churchyard.

=== New church ===
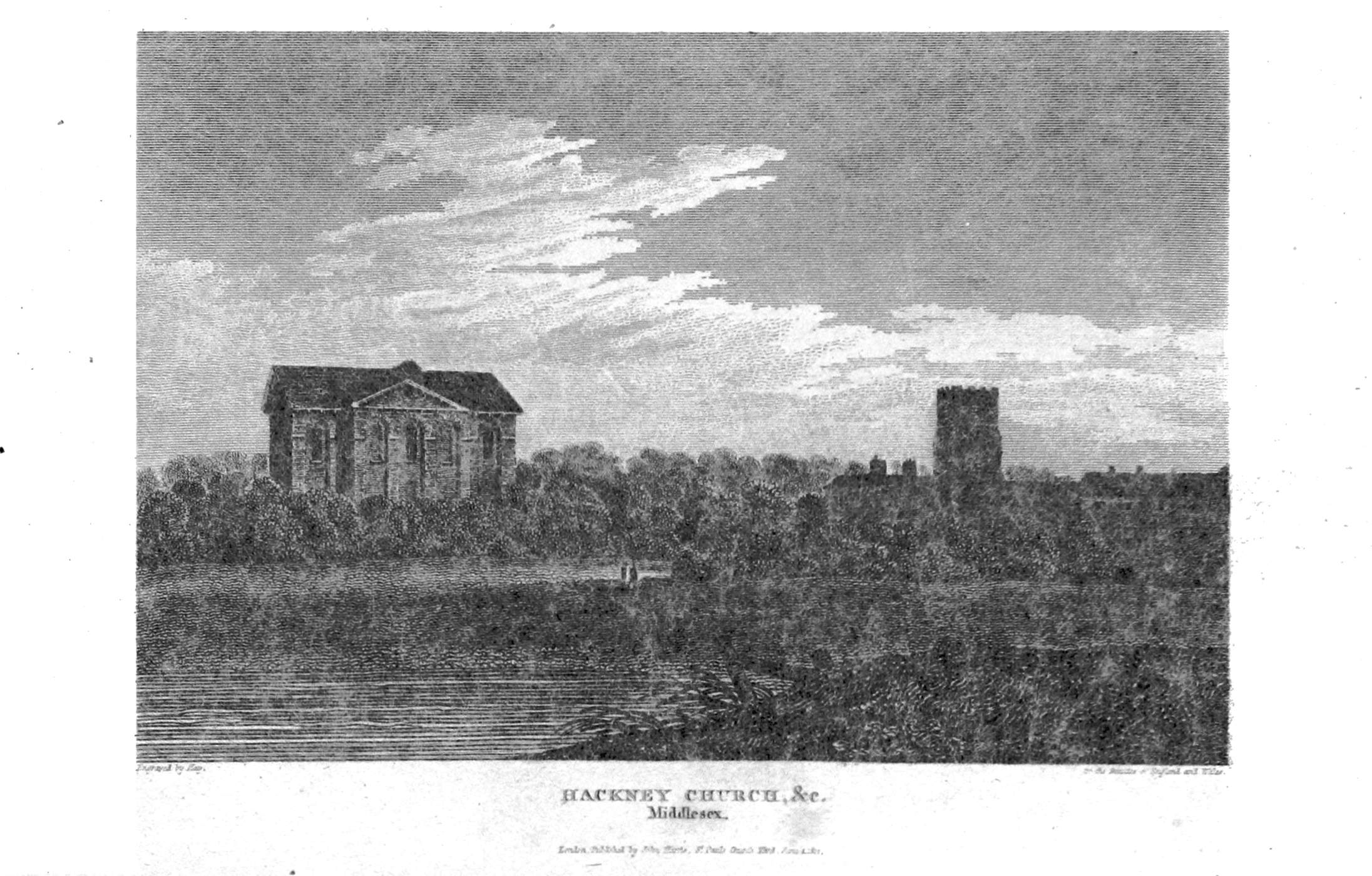
1812 engraving of the church, without a tower

A new church, tower and vestry room would be built within three years of laying the foundation and the old church subsequently demolished, with only its Tower remaining. In the event the initial estimates of costs were significantly incorrect and two further acts had to be passed through Parliament to allow extra money to be raised.

William Blackburn died suddenly in November 1790; a month later James Spiller, influenced by and a friend of Sir John Soane, was chosen from six candidates; Hackney Church was his largest project to date and remains Spiller's magnum opus. Believing that a building seating 3,000 would have poor acoustics, he persuaded the trustees to allow him to reduce the capacity to 2,000, but remained convinced that the acoustics would not be good unless the church was full.

Work began in 1792 and the main structure took more than two years to complete. The church was consecrated on 15 July 1797.

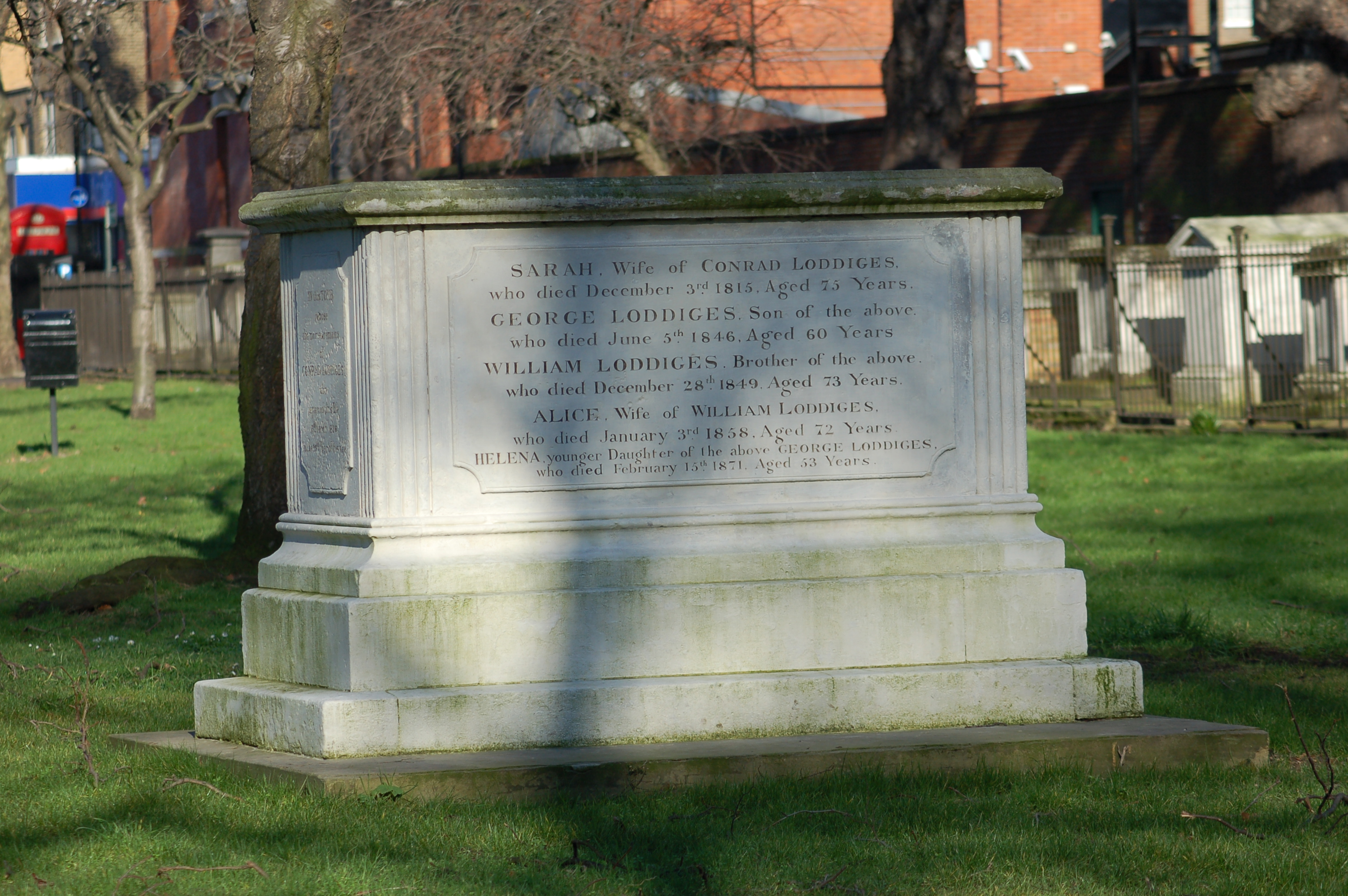
Loddiges' family vault in St John's Church Gardens

Harry Sedgwick, a trustee, oversaw a subscription for planting the churchyard. 129 subscriptions enabled nearly 200 elms and horse chestnuts to be planted in avenues. Sedgwick was later buried in the churchyard; and his planting achievement is commemorated on his tomb. Sedgwick lost his only son in action in the Napoleonic War; he has an elaborate memorial inside the church.

In March 1798 the body of the old church was demolished and several of the tombs removed to the new church. The tower remained - left intact to hold the bells as funds did not allow building a tower on the new church. In 1814 the tower was added to the church and, in 1816, a stained glass east window was installed behind the altar.

The old tower of St Augustine's Church remains standing and plays a symbolic and ceremonial role in Hackney: it has adorned the masthead of the Hackney Gazette since its foundation in 1864 and is incorporated in the coat of arms of the London Borough of Hackney. In 1871 an appeal was launched to provide the tower with a four-faced clock, and this was duly installed by Gillet & Brand on New Year's Day in 1872.

In 1890 the church purchased the early 16th-century house on Homerton High Street, in the grounds of which was constructed a school, and the house named the St John's Church Institute. This would later be purchased by the National Trust, and is now known as Sutton House.

The churchyard closed to burials in 1859, after which it became overgrown and derelict. It was laid out by the Metropolitan Public Gardens Association's landscape gardener Fanny Wilkinson, which included the demolition of Henry Rowe's 1614 mortuary chapel, and opened for public recreation in 1894.

In 1902 the church was renovated and had electric lights installed, the repairs and alterations costing £1,823. In the 1920s, with the roof becoming structurally unstable, the church was forced to temporarily close, with the timbers being shored up with scaffolding. The roof was reconstructed in 1929.

The war dead of Hackney are commemorated by a stone monolith in the churchyard in front of the north entrance, erected in 1921.

== 1954 fire damage repairs ==
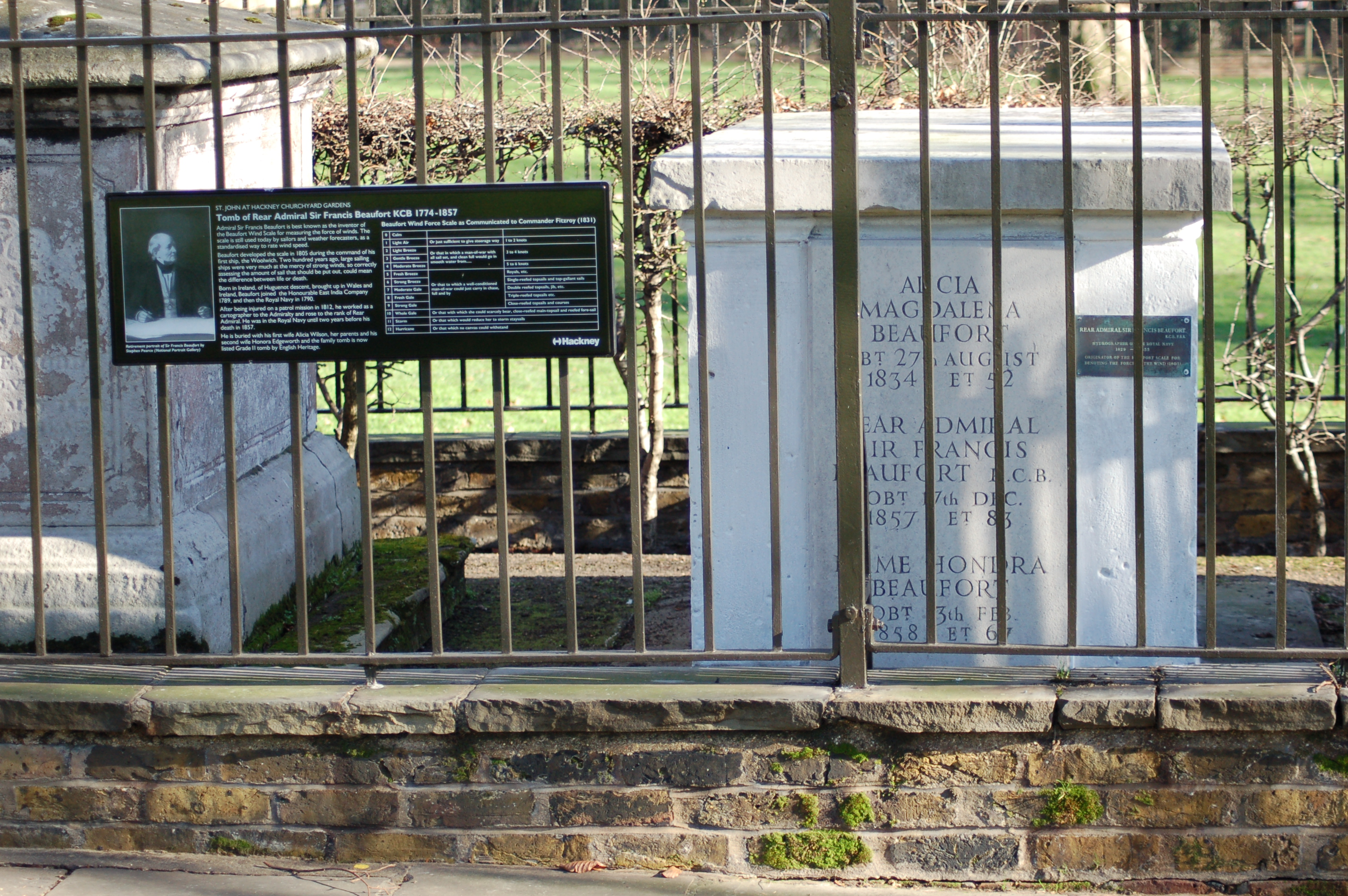
The Beaufort family tomb in St John's Church Gardens

The repairs to the roof had not entirely fixed the problems of the 1920s, and further reconstruction work was scheduled for the summer of 1954. On 18 May 1955 a fire started in the church roof among workmen's tools, destroying the roof, some of the pews and the 1799 organ by George Pike England. During the ensuing major reconstruction work there was some reordering of the interior, including the insertion of a partition at the south end of the church to create the Hurdman Hall.

A replacement three manual Mander organ came from All Saint's Ennismore Gardens, Kensington; altar hangings designed for the coronation of Queen Elizabeth II at Westminster Abbey were donated; and the east window replaced by a new one designed by Christopher Webb. The new church was reconsecrated on 24 June 1958 (St John's Day).

At the fête on 5 July 2008, the church and its churchyard were rededicated by the Archdeacon of Hackney, in celebration of the 50th anniversary of the post-fire reconstruction and the major regeneration of the church gardens the previous year. St John's Church Gardens, around the tower and church, were awarded a Green Flag award and Green Flag Heritage status in 2008. As of 2022, St John at Hackney churchyard currently holds a Green Flag award.

== 2018 restoration project ==
With the fabric of the church still requiring significant repair, a multi-million pound restoration project began in 2018, claiming to reconfigure the church closer to its original Greek Cross plan and its original architectural language, and provide a setting for both church services and public concerts. New features included two new chapels in the north and south transepts, a raised performance stage, theatrical lighting and new backstage facilities. Funding included a £1.84mn grant from the National Lottery Heritage Fund and the project team included minimalist designer John Pawson CBE and set designer Es Devlin OBE. In 2019, the church opened new community facilities in the adjacent Hackney Gardens, formerly the churchyard, for outreach and social activities. The main church reopened for worship and as a popular music venue in September 2020, and has since welcomed thousands of people through its doors {citation needed}. The restoration won an RIBA National Award in 2022.

== Clergy ==
In 2026 the Rector of Hackney is Rev'd Al Gordon, instituted by the Bishop of Stepney in 2016, representing a change of churchmanship to the charismatic evangelical tradition. Other clergy include Rev'd Mark Nelson, Associate Rector, and Rev'd Naomi Maxwell, Curate.

== Notable burials ==
- Francis Beaufort, creator of the Beaufort scale
- Edward de Vere, 17th Earl of Oxford (d.1604), Elizabethan courtier, poet, playwright
- David Dolben (d.1633), a Welsh Bishop of Bangor where his monument, containing a half-length statue and a eulogistic description of him, still stands.
- Timothy Hall (d.1690), former Bishop of Oxford
- Joachim Conrad Loddiges (d.1826), botanist
- Sir Edward Michelborne (c. 1562 − 1609) explorer and adventurer
- William Nash (d.1875), recipient of the Victoria Cross
- Henry Percy (d.1537), 6th Earl of Northumberland, alleged formerly the betrothed of Anne Boleyn
- Sir Henry Rowe (d.1612), Mayor of London
- Lady Lucy Somerset, Baroness Latimer (d.1583), noblewoman and the daughter of Henry Somerset, 2nd Earl of Worcester
- Christopher Urswick (d.1522), formerly Rector of Hackney and Dean of Windsor
- John James Watson (d.1839), former Rector of Hackney and Archdeacon of St Albans, prominent member of the Hackney Phalanx

== Sources ==
- Guide to the Local Administrative Units of England, Vol.1, Frederic Youngs, London, 1979
