= Last Tuesday Society =

The Last Tuesday Society is a London-based organisation run by artist Viktor Wynd with directors Allison Crawbuck and Rhys Everett. Based at an eponymous gallery space and cocktail bar in Hackney, the society holds regular absinthe tastings, literary and artistic events.

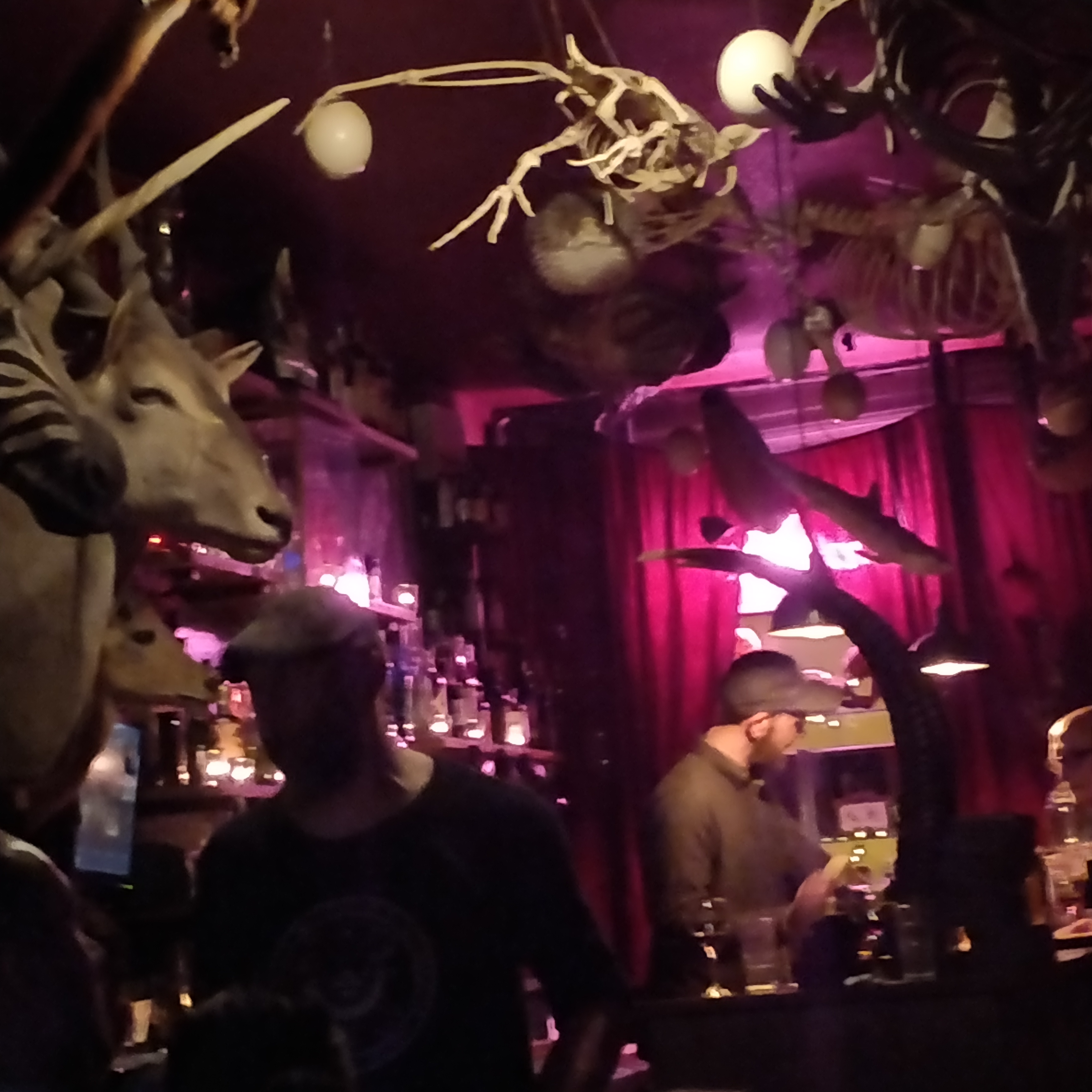
Interior Last Tuesday Society cocktail bar

== History ==
Viktor Wynd previously operated The Little Shop of Horrors, located in Mare Street, which dealt in taxidermy, shrunken heads and other curiosities. He also ran the Viktor Wynd Fine Art commercial gallery, where over 50 shows were curated including on Mervyn Peake Tessa Farmer, Leonora Carrington and Stephen Tennant.

Following a Kickstarter crowdfunding campaign in 2014, many of these items and artworks were moved to display at The Viktor Wynd Museum of Curiosities, Fine Art & Natural History, part of The Last Tuesday Society space. Also in the building is a cocktail bar specialises in traditional absinthes. In 2019 the Absinthe Parlour was named the Best Bar in London at the 7th annual Design My Night Awards.
