= Tessa Farmer =

English artist

- Born: 1978 (age 47–48); Birmingham, UK
- Education: The Ruskin, Oxford – BA 2000, MA 2003
- Known for: Sculpture
- Notable work: Miniature Worlds at the Jerwood Space, The Mouse That Roared at Project 133 in Peckham, and The Terror at Firstsite in Colchester.

Tessa Farmer (born 1978, Birmingham, UK) is an artist based in London. Her work, made from insect carcasses, plant roots and other found natural materials, comprises hanging installations depicting Boschian battles between insects and tiny winged skeletal humanoids.

Farmer studied at The Ruskin School of Drawing and Fine Art, Oxford, receiving her Bachelor of Arts in 2000 and her Master of Arts in 2003. Subsequent awards include the Vivien Leigh Prize, a sculpture residency in King's Wood, Challock, Kent, and a Royal British Society of Sculptors Bursary Award. Her work is in the collections of the Saatchi Gallery and the Ashmolean Museum among others.

In 2007, Farmer was artist in residence at the Natural History Museum and was chosen for the final shortlist of The Times/South Bank Show Breakthrough Award.

In 2015, she won the BSFA Award for Best Artwork 2014, for an installation inspired by The Wasp Factory from Iain Banks.

== Family ==
Her great-grandfather is Arthur Machen – author of The Great God Pan, and The White People. Tessa was unfamiliar with Machen's work until a member of The Friends of Arthur Machen drew her attention to similarities between some of Machen's stories and Tessa's own work. Since then, Machen has become an influence in her artwork.

== Selected exhibitions ==
- 2018 Anima Mundi St Ives, 'Out of the Earth'
- 2018 Leeds Arts University Leeds, 'Zsofia Jakab :Beckoning'
- 2017 bo.lee gallery London, 'Nature's Alchemy'
- 2016 Griffin Gallery London, 'Perfectionism (Part III): The Alchemy of Making'
- 2016 Studio 3 Gallery, Kent London, 'Curio: Sites of Wonder'
- 2015 Viktor Wynd Museum of Curiosities London, 'In Fairyland'
- 2015 Leeds College of Art Leeds, 'In Fairyland'
- 2014 The Holburne Museum Bath, 'Unwelcome Visitors'
- 2012 Spencer Brownstone Gallery New York, 'ISAM: Control Over Nature'
- 2012 Millennium St Ives, 'From the Deep'
- 2011 Viktor Wynd Museum of Curiosities London, 'The Coming of the Fairies'
- 2011 Crypt Gallery London, 'ISAM: Control Over Nature'
- 2011 Danielle Arnaud Contemporary Art London, 'Nymphidia
