= Viktor Wynd =

British artist and gallery director

- Born: Robert Wyndam Bucknell London, U.K.
- Occupations: artist; writer; museum director
- Years active: 1995–present

Viktor Wynd is a British artist, author, and curator, known for his collections of curiosities.

== Artwork ==
Wynd established The Viktor Wynd Museum of Curiosities, Fine Art & Natural History in London's East End, a cabinet of curiosities featuring two-headed lambs, Fiji mermaids, unicorns, taxidermy, dodo bones, erotica, old master etchings, surrealist, occult and outsider art, and celebrity faeces. The museum was featured in a BBC Four documentary on cabinets of curiosity.

He previously ran a curiosity shop, Viktor Wynd's Little Shop of Horrors, dealing in taxidermy, shrunken heads and other oddities, including the erect mummified penis of a hanged man. In 2010 it was reported that Jonathan Ross's wife Jane Goldman had bought the skeleton of a two-headed baby from the shop.

He has curated around 50 exhibitions at his gallery, Viktor Wynd Fine Art, including exhibitions on Mervyn Peake, Tessa Farmer, Leonora Carrington, and Stephen Tennant.

In 2005, Wynd had an exhibition entitled "Structures of The Sublime: Towards a Greater Understanding of Chaos" at Ingalls & Associates in Miami, featuring drawings and video.

In 2007 he had another exhibition in Miami entitled "The Sorrows of Young Wynd" (in reference to Johann Wolfgang von Goethe) based around a waxwork figure of himself hanging by a noose from the middle of the gallery, and many other images of him committing suicide.

He founded The Last Tuesday Society with David Piper in 2003, which became known in London for its halloween parties and masked balls, often with literary themes. He also organised Wyndstock, a festival held at Houghton Hall in Norfolk, and runs a long-running literary salon in London.

== Other work ==
Wynd is the author of four books. His first, Structures of The Sublime: Towards a Greater Understanding of Chaos, a fragmentary modernist anti-novel, was published in Miami in 2005. He went on to publish Viktor Wynd's Cabinet of Wonders with Prestel/Random House in 2014. His third book, The Unnatural History Museum, was released by Prestel/Penguin Random House in 2020, followed most recently by Dark Fairy Tales: Stories from Around the World (That Are Definitely Not Suitable for Children) in 2025.

Wynd wrote an essay about his friend Sebastian Horsley for Yale University Press's book Artist/Rebel/Dandy: Men of Fashion, compiled by Kate Irvin and Laurie Anne Brewer.

He has made several TV appearances, including the National Geographic documentary series Taboo. He has also lectured about cabinets of curiosities, his book and his museum at The Lost Lectures, the British Library, Manchester University, 5x15, and the Barbican.

He is a committee member of the London Institute of 'Pataphysics.
