= James Spiller =

James Spiller (c.1761–1829) was an English architect and surveyor, a close associate of Sir John Soane. His designs included the Church of St John-at-Hackney, and the Great Synagogue, London.

== Life ==
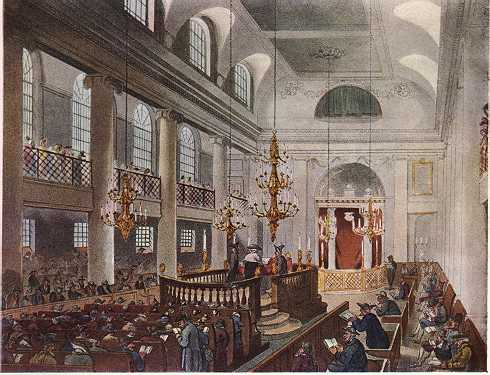
Interior of the Great Synagogue (1788–90).

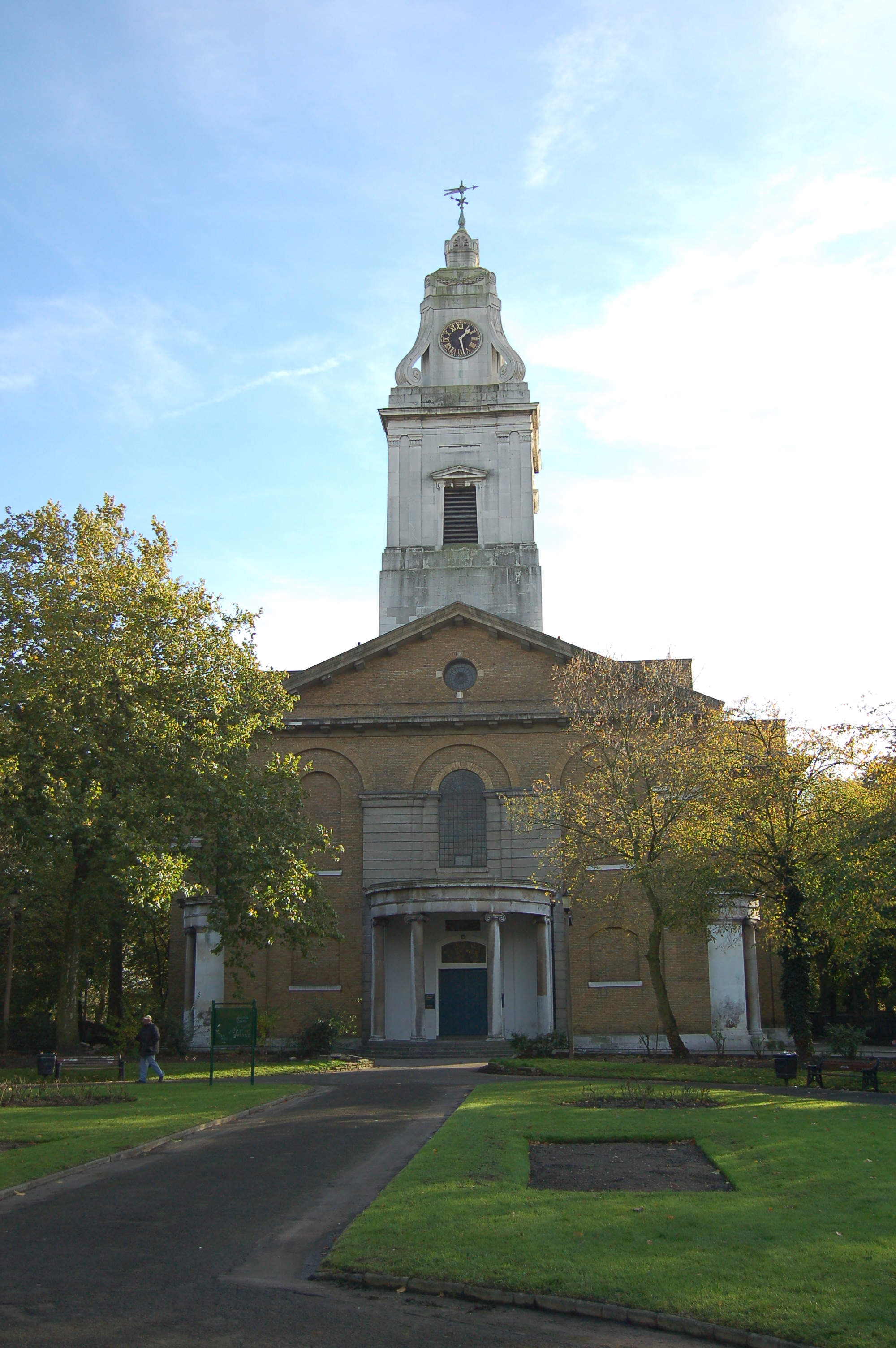
Church of St John-at-Hackney (1792–7; porches and steeple 1812–13).

Spiller was a pupil of the architect James Wyatt and became a close friend of John Soane, who sometimes employed him as a surveyor, and to draft papers on subjects on which they shared views such as the evils of speculative building. John Summerson described Spiller as "a clever man, with a difficult temperament, which perhaps was against his emerging into the front rank of architects."

He was responsible for two major religious buildings in London. The first, the Great Synagogue in Duke's Place, was built in 1788–90. The building, with its tall Ionic colonnades and flat ceiling, was described by Thomas Pennant as being "in a beautiful style of the simplest Grecian architecture". It was destroyed by bombing during the Second World War. His new parish church of St John-at-Hackney – a bulky brick building with a Greek Cross plan – was constructed in 1792–7. In 1812–13 he added porches and, in stark contrast to the rest of the structure, a Portland Stone steeple with flowing curvelinear elements.

In 1801 he exhibited drawings for a house at Roehampton for Benjamin Goldsmid.Named Elm Grove, it replaced one destroyed by fire in about 1790, and was itself destroyed during the Second World War.

In 1817 he remodelled the interior of James Wyatt's chapel of ease (later the Church of Saint John the Baptist) in Highgate Road, Kentish Town, and in 1820 he added a portico with square piers to Benjamin Dean Wyatt's Theatre Royal, Drury Lane.

He was surveyor to the British Fire Office (from 1799), the Royal Exchange Insurance, and the Eagle Insurance Corporation.

He died in at his home in Guildford Street, London on 3 May 1829

His brother John (1763–94) was a sculptor who made a statue of Charles II for the Royal Exchange.

== Writings ==
- Address to the Governors & Guardians of the Foundling-Hospital, by Jas. Spiller and Thos. Spencer, ... intended as a justification of their reports and proceedings, in reply to observations upon their said reports and proceedings, by Samuel Pepys Cockerell, Esq. (1807); republished with an additional letter as Reports upon the buildings erected on the estate of the Foundling Hospital (1808).
- Letter to John Soane on the subject of the new churches (1822). Spiller also conducted a lengthy private correspondence with Soane, in which he criticised the Church Commissioners' enthusiasm for competitions and their emphasis on economy. Soane financed the printing of 500 copies of the first Letter. It was superseded by a Second Letter to John Soane (1823); more than 100 loose copies of the first one remain in the Soane archive.

== Sources ==
- Darley, Gillian (1999). John Soane:An Accidental Romantic. Yale University Press. ISBN 9780300086959.
- Summerson, John (1962). Georgian London (revised ed.). Harmondsworth: Penguin Books.
