= The Viktor Wynd Museum of Curiosities, Fine Art & Natural History =

Curiosity museum in Hackney, London

Coordinates: 51.5347301°N 0.0575708°W

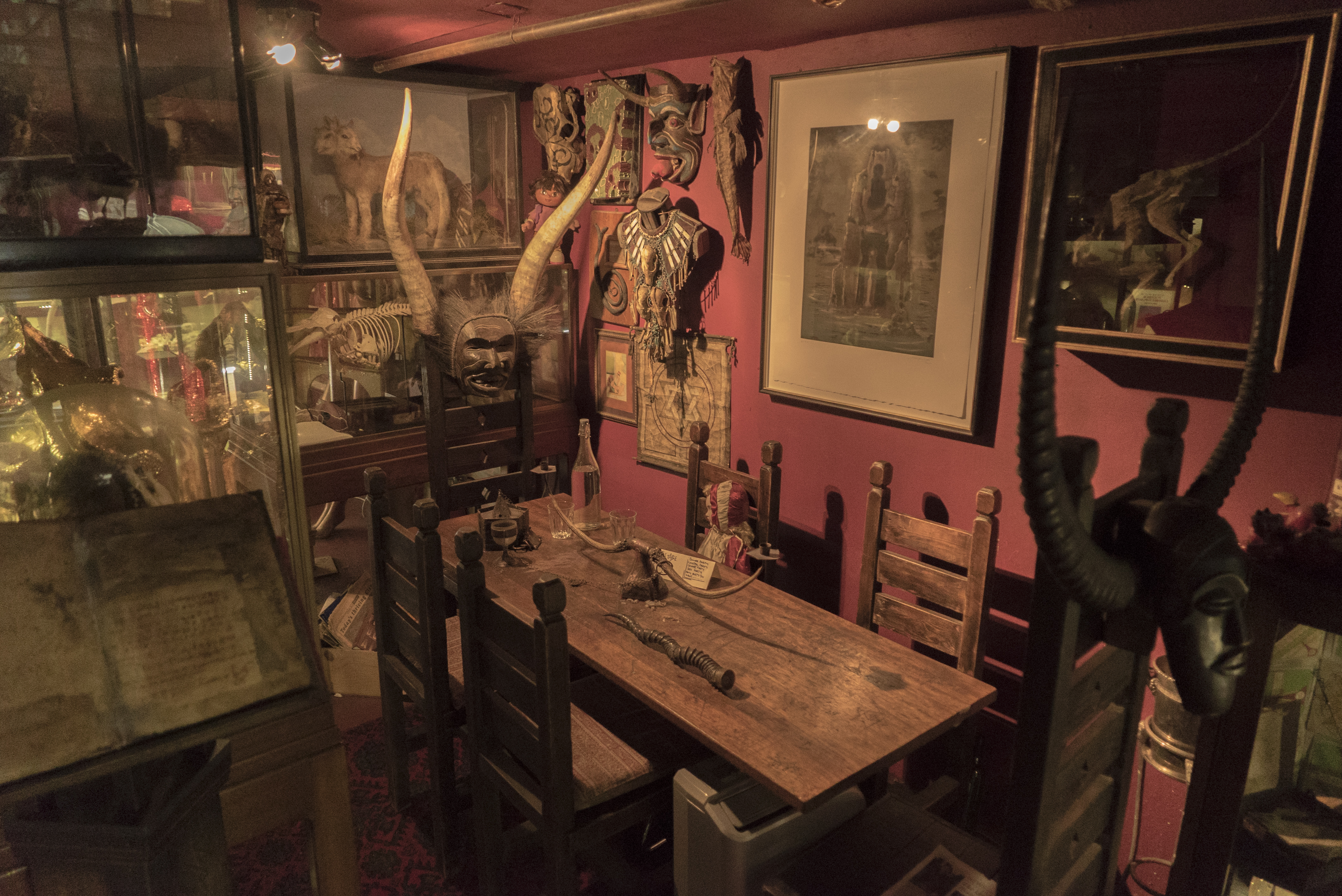
The interior of the Viktor Wynd Museum

The Viktor Wynd Museum of Curiosities, Fine Art & Natural History is a museum and bar in Hackney, situated in a former call centre on Mare Street in the London Borough of Hackney. It is operated by Viktor Wynd and part of The Last Tuesday Society and was funded on Kickstarter in 2015.

== Collections ==
The museum collection includes classic curiosities such as hairballs, two headed lambs and Fiji mermaids, its art collection spans several centuries including the largest collection of work by Austin Osman Spare on public display alongside a large collection of work by the Anglo-Mexican surrealist Leonora Carrington. The museum's natural history collection includes dodo bones and extinct bird feathers, as well as much taxidermy and the skeleton of a giant anteater. It has a section dedicated to the Dandy, including Sebastian Horsley's nails from his crucifixion and drawings and archive material to do with Stephen Tennant, a collection of human remains including shrunken heads, Tribal Skulls, dead babies in bottles and parts of pickled sex workers, tribal art collected in The Congo and New Guinea by the proprietor, fossils, and scientific and medical instruments. It also displays celebrity faecal matter, erotica and condoms used by the Rolling Stones. The contents of the museum are insured for £1 million. The museum is generally open to the public but is occasionally hired out for private events.

The Museum holds regular exhibitions of artists including Alasdair Gray, Mervyn Peake, Gunter Grass, Robin Ironside and English Surrealists.
