= Homerton =

Area of East London, England

Coordinates: 51.55212°N 0.04704°W

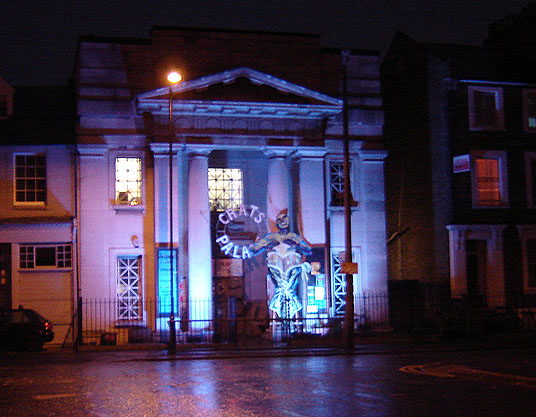
- Chats Palace has been an important local arts centre and music venue for 40 years. It is housed in the former Homerton Library, the new one is close by.

- Location within Greater London
- OS grid reference: TQ355855
  - Charing Cross: 4.5 mi (7.2 km) SW
- London borough: Hackney
- Ceremonial county: Greater London
- Region: London
- Country: England
- Sovereign state: United Kingdom
- Post town: LONDON
- Postcode district: E9/E5
- Dialling code: 020
- Police: Metropolitan
- Fire: London
- Ambulance: London
- UK Parliament: Hackney South and Shoreditch
- London Assembly: North East

Homerton (/ˈhɒmərtən/ HOM-ər-tən) is an area of Hackney in London, England, in the London Borough of Hackney. It is bordered to the west by Hackney Central, to the north by Lower Clapton, in the east by Hackney Wick, Leyton and by South Hackney to the south. There are fifty listed buildings located within the boundaries of the Homerton electoral ward.

== History ==
=== Origins ===
Archaeological excavations at Link Street exposed a building dating to the 11th or 12th century suggesting that Homerton existed before it was first recorded in 1343. The hamlet of Homerton (Humberton or Hummerton, named for the farm of a woman named Hunburh) developed for about a half-mile along the road on the north side of the now buried and lost Hackney Brook, within the vale formed by the brook. This led from the hamlet of Clopton, passing near the church of St Augustine at Hackney, then across the marshes and the crossing points of both the River Lea, and its tributary, Hackney Brook. By 1605 Homerton was the most populous part of the Parish of Hackney, becoming a separate parish in 1846.

=== Medieval Homerton ===
In medieval times, Homerton, like much of Hackney, was predominantly rural and arable crops were grown, together with fruit and vegetables for the City of London markets. The majority of the land was given over to pasture for sheep and cattle, and milk and cheese were also supplied to the city. Small kitchen gardens ran at the back of the houses along the road, with large fields behind. Domestic brewing was common (there are records of brewing performed at Sutton House and the Tan House). Many unsavoury activities (banned in the city) were also undertaken, such as tanning and fulling - the cleaning of felt cloth using urine.

=== Tudor wealth ===
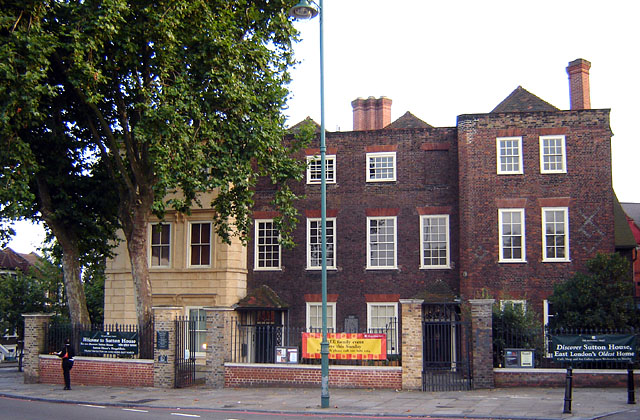
Sutton House, the oldest house in Hackney. (September 2005)

Homerton became a desirable suburb of London in the Tudor period, with many estates and grand houses being formed from the former Templar lands (Knights Templar of St. John of Jerusalem). The village was divided between Upper and Lower Homerton, with the later extending towards the marshes and the house at Hackney Wick. Upper Homerton was divided from the village of Hackney by the width of the rectory manor's Church Field, and a path led to the churchyard. In 1538, this estate, including other fields lying along the brook, passed to the Tudor diplomat Sir Ralph Sadler. Around 1560 part of this estate came into the ownership of Thomas Sutton, a resident of the Tan House (adjacent to Sutton House). This land formed part of his endowment of the Hospital of King James in Charterhouse, who continued to own the property until the 20th century, building Sutton Place between 1790 and 1806.

=== The marshes ===
Marsh Road, from Homerton High Street, led to, and across the marshes, towards the Templar owned water-powered corn mill at Temple Mills. Prone to flooding, the marshes were primarily used for grazing. A Roman stone causeway was discovered in the 1770s.

By 1795 the former Templar mills were being used for preparing lead. Sheets of lead were placed in clay pots and submerged in urine, then heated by decaying cow dung. The process converted the lead to lead oxide, and it was then finely ground to form a pigment for white, yellow and red lead paint. A new watermill was established on the marshes by Prince Rupert for an improved method of boring guns; however, the secret died with him in 1682, and the enterprise collapsed.

=== Religion and education ===
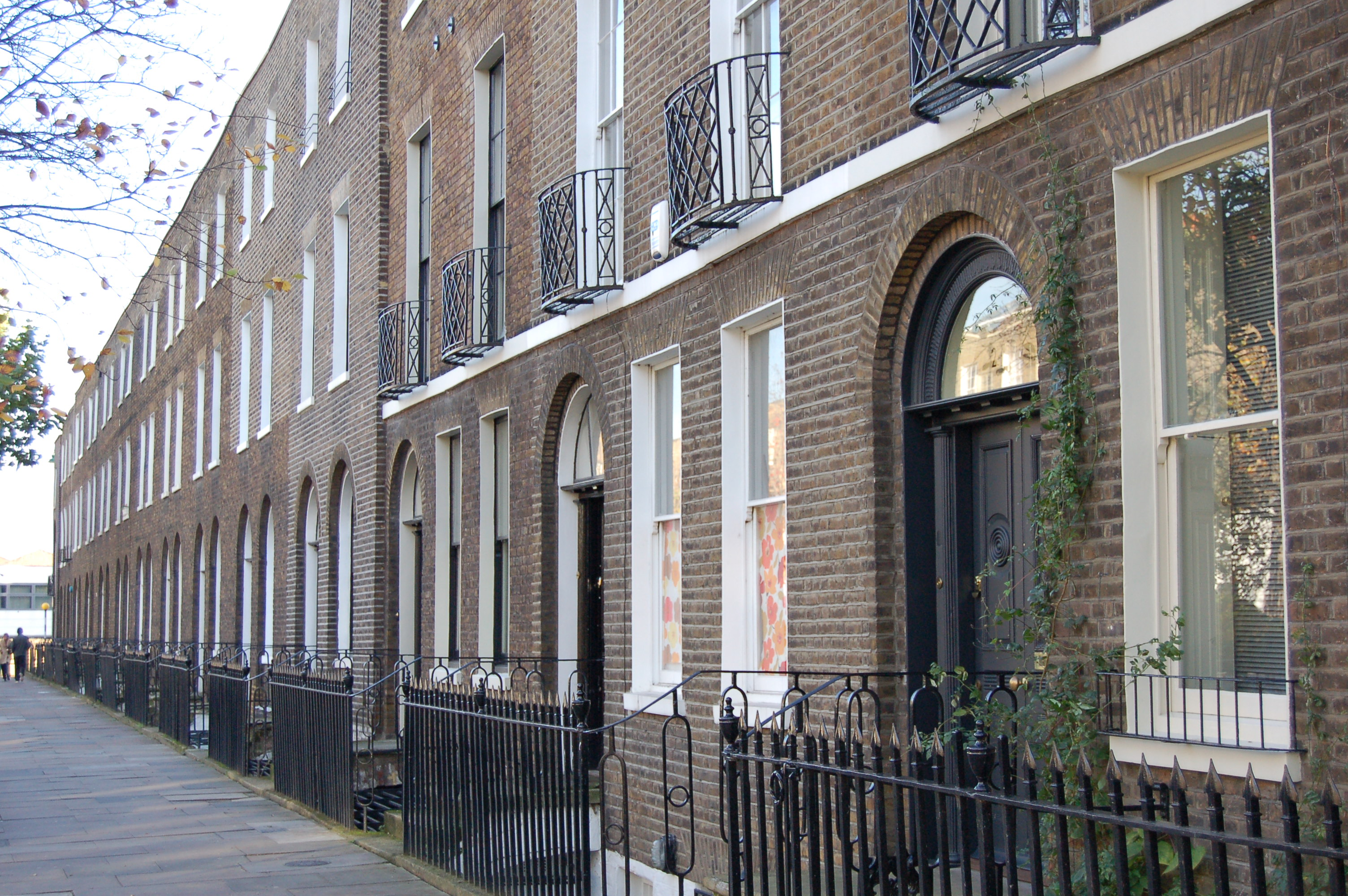
Sutton Place, Grade II listed terrace 1790–1806 in Homerton. (November 2005)

In the 18th century the availability of land, large houses and tolerance to dissenters made Homerton a popular place to found institutions. The educational ones were commonly known as Dissenting Academies. The Kings Head Society moved to a large house here in 1768, forming Homerton College for the education of Calvinist ministers with between 12 and 20 students. Religious education moved to the new University College London in 1826, but Homerton College remained here as a teacher training college until 1896 when it moved to Cambridge, eventually becoming a full college of the University of Cambridge in 2010. Students from Homerton college were principal in forming, in 1881, both the Glynn Cricket Club and Clapton Orient - which became Leyton Orient F.C. on its move to Leyton. The buildings of the college were rebuilt and expanded several times, but eventually lost to bomb damage in World War II.

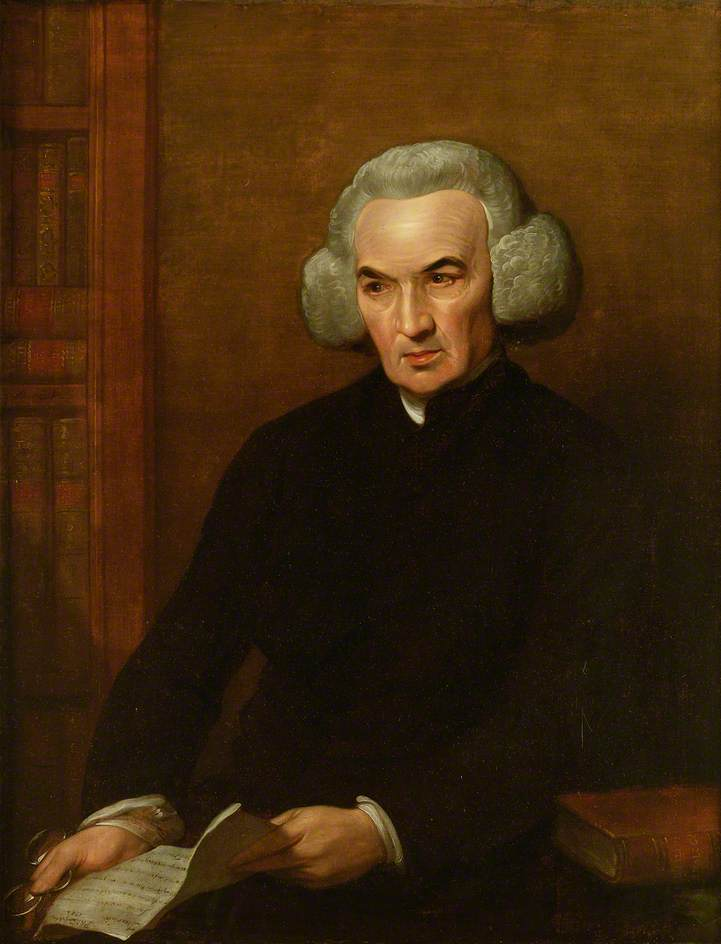
Richard Price

South of the Brook, by Money Lane, the Unitarian Gravel Pit Meeting House was built between 1715 and 1716. This was the result of an acrimonious split in the congregation of the Lower Clapton meeting. Notable nonconformist ministers preached at the Old Gravel Pit. The moral and political philosopher Richard Price, known for his support of the American Revolution, became morning preacher in 1770, while continuing his afternoon sermons at Newington Green Chapel, on the green where he lived. Those who attended his sermons in Homerton included American politicians such as John Adams, who later became the second president of the United States, and his wife Abigail. On the 101st anniversary of the Glorious Revolution, he preached a sermon at Old Jewry meeting house entitled "A Discourse on the Love of Our Country", thus igniting a so-called "pamphlet war" known as the Revolution Controversy, furiously debating the issues raised by the French Revolution. Burke's rebuttal "Reflections on the Revolution in France" attacked Price, whose friends Thomas Paine and Mary Wollstonecraft leapt into the fray to defend their mentor. The reputation of Price for speaking without fear of the government on these political and philosophical matters drew huge crowds to his sermons, which were published and sold as pamphlets (i.e. publications easily printed and circulated). Another eminent minister was the formidable polymath, Joseph Priestley, discoverer of oxygen. When his support of dissent led to the riots named after him, he fled Birmingham and headed for London; he was appointed minister here in 1793. Today a Blue Plaque marks the site of the Gravel Pit Meeting House in Ram Place and a brown plaque marks the site of the Priestley's house at 113 Lower Clapton Road (on the corner of Clapton Passage). Priestley said of his time here, "On the whole I spent my life more happily at Hackney than I had ever done before". The meeting house is now used as a factory.

=== Victorian era ===
A map showing the Homerton ward of Hackney Metropolitan Borough as it appeared in 1916.

A spur connecting the North London Railway at Dalston to Stratford, forming a part of the Eastern Counties and Thames Junction Railway, opened in 1847 for the carriage of coal. This resulted in Hackney Brook being placed in a culvert and the loss of the extensive watercress fields to the south of Homerton High Street. Its later development as a passenger line led to the redevelopment in the 1880s of the mediaeval core of the village on Homerton High Street with Victorian dwellings and public houses, and speculative building on the lands either side of Homerton High Street. In 1868 Homerton Station opened.

The parish church of St Barnabas on Homerton High Street, designed by Hackney-born Arthur Ashpitel, was built between 1843 and 1852, of Kentish ragstone, with a grant from the Incorporated Church Building Society and its endowment and vicarage funded by Joshua Watson. Described by Nikolaus Pevsner as "interesting as an effort to copy local character", it is built in the perpendicular style and was Grade II listed in 1975. Having been damaged by bombing during 1944, it was restored after World War Two and rededicated in 1958. At the time of the church's construction, the area was described as being inhabited by a "very poor class of labourers & those who trust to precarious employment".

The church of St Luke, Chatham Place, consecrated in 1872, is situated in the south of the Homerton area. It was designed by Arthur Shean Newman and Arthur Billing in a gothic revival style, and is Grade II listed. Construction of the Grade II listed red brick church of St Paul, Lower Homerton on Glyn Road, was completed in 1891. It was designed in combination of Arts and Crafts and Early English styles, by Henry Cowell Boyes, the architect of the Worshipful Company of Grocers, which also operated a school in the area, with its foundation stone being laid by the livery company's Master. It was declared redundant, first being used by the Celestial Church of Christ before being taken over by a Seventh-Day Adventist congregation in 2006. The Roman Catholic church of the Immaculate Heart of Mary on Kenworthy Road, designed by C.A. Buckler and inspired by the churches of Sta Maria in Dominica and Santi Nereo e Achillo was completed in 1883, and rebuilt after damage in World War Two.

In the early 1890s, the author of Glimpses of Ancient Hackney wrote: "Few who traverse Homerton today will fail to note the squalid poverty of many of its inhabitants, the mean tumble-down dwellings, for which we have to thank the jerry-builders, who doubtless will pass the odium on to the ground landlords".

By the 1860s, London fell prey to epidemics of fever. The 200 bed Eastern Fever Hospital was founded in September 1870 by the Metropolitan Asylums Board to prevent contagion. There were six wards for typhus, two each for scarlet fever and enteric patients. Two smaller wards were reserved for 'special cases'. The buildings were almost entirely demolished in 1982 and the site became the core of the modern Homerton University Hospital, which opened in 1986. This replaced the old Hackney Hospital which (in turn) had been formed from the Hackney Union Workhouse. These buildings are now used by the Hackney Mental Health Trust.

=== Industry and housing ===
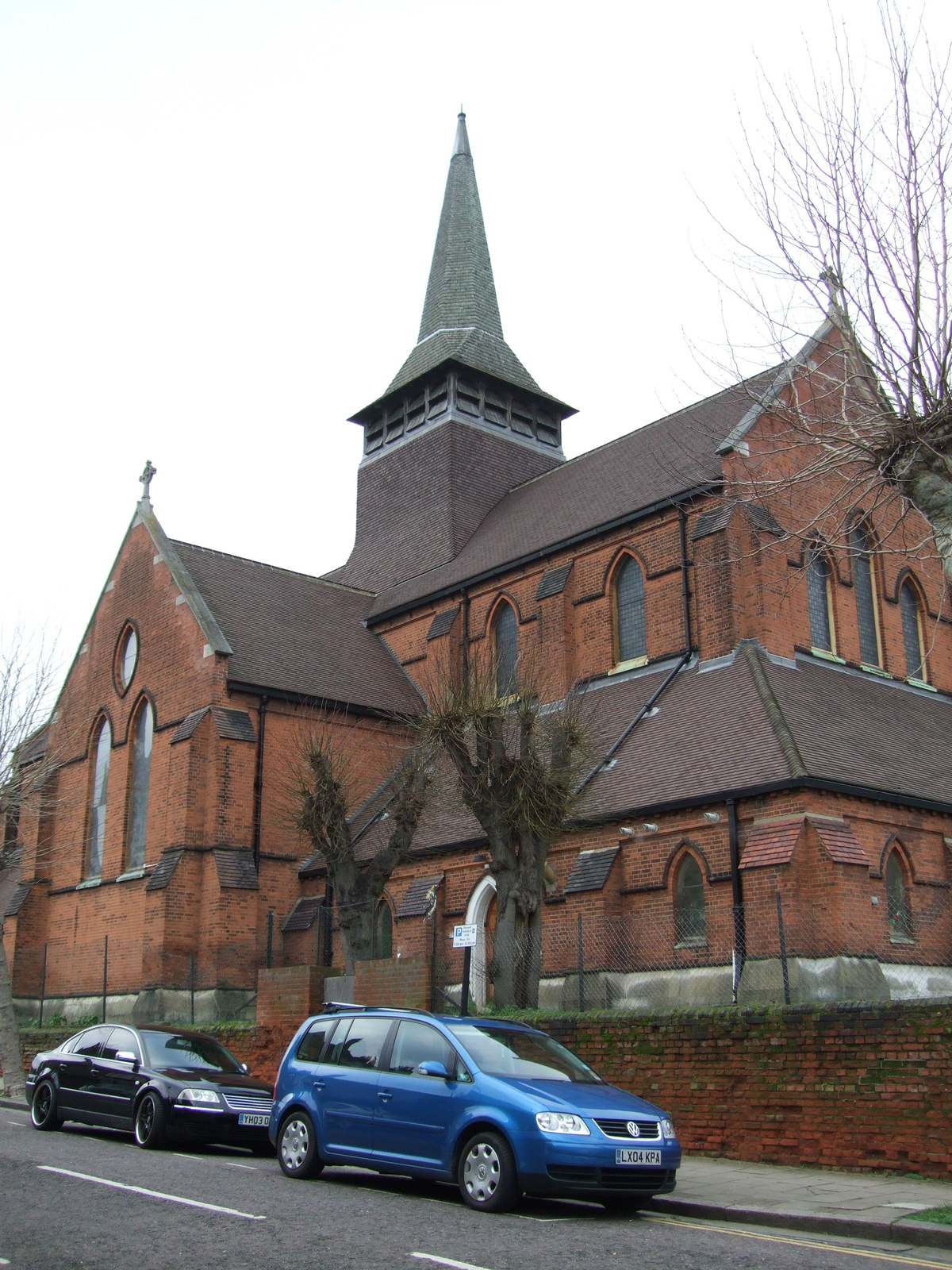
The church of St Paul, Lower Homerton, built 1890-91

The coming of the railways and the building of the fever hospital drove many of the wealthier residents away. The tightly packed Victorian streets provided homes for the clerks and employees of the new purpose-built factories (like Berger Paints) being built in the area. From 1937 onwards, the London County Council built mass housing, sweeping away the worst of the slums, but also eliminating many older buildings containing shops on Homerton High Street, effectively destroying it as a commercial area. The Lesney die cast model factory was built in the 1940s on the Homerton side of the Lee Navigation, just north of Homerton Road, producing for many years their Matchbox brand. The factory closed in 1990 and was demolished in 2010.

The oldest surviving residential building in Hackney is Sutton House on Homerton High Street. It was built in 1535 and is owned and run by the National Trust.

=== In modern times ===
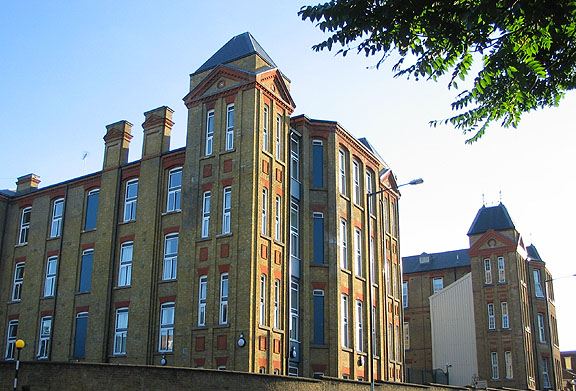
Hackney Hospital, August 2005. Marc Bolan (born, Mark Feld), and Anthony Newley were both born here.

1970s glam rock singer Marc Bolan and actor Ray Winstone were born in Hackney Hospital, on Homerton High Street. The hospital, originally built in 1841 as the Hackney Union workhouse, finally closed in 1995. The old hospital was refurbished in 2006 and reopened to serve the mental health trust.

Homerton's links with popular music continued with the arrival of Toe Rag Studios, relocated from Shoreditch to the Lower Clapton/Homerton border, an eight-track recording studio which uses reclaimed 1960s analogue equipment, where the White Stripes' acclaimed 2003 album Elephant was produced. More recently, Sound Savers studios was also established in Homerton, and Gun Factory Studios relocated to the area from Stoke Newington. UK drill artist Unknown T is from Homerton.

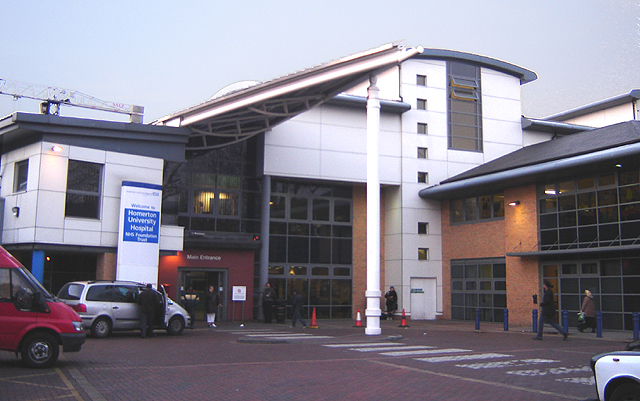
Homerton University Hospital main entrance. (February 2006)

Homerton is also home to Chats Palace arts centre, named after the nearby Chatsworth Road. Chats Palace has presented and encouraged a wide variety of music, comedy, theatre, photography, carnival, disability arts, dance and transgressive performance, including Clifford Jarvis, Tom Hunter, Miniscule of Sound, Red Saunders, Asian Dub Foundation and Graeae Theatre Company. The building itself was originally established as a Carnegie library, built in 1912–13 for the betterment of the people of the East End. The council closed the library in 1976 but members of the local community reclaimed the building. In October 2014, historic pub the Chesham Arms on Mehetabel Road became Hackney's first Asset of Community Value.

Homerton is home to the Castle Cinema, which re-opened following a successful Kickstarter campaign raised £57,000 to support its renovation in 2016.

In 2018 a UK artist by the name of Unknown T made a song about Homerton, called Homerton B which blew him up and since then he became the biggest artist out of Homerton.

== Representation ==
Homerton ward on Hackney Borough Council is currently represented by three Labour councillors. The ward covers an area of 0.830 sq kilometres.

== Population and demographics ==
In 2019, the Homerton electoral ward had a population of 14,658 people. The ethnicity of the population was 43.9% White, 33.0% Black, 10.9% Asian and 7.8% Mixed.

== Education ==
Secondary schools located in the area include Cardinal Pole Catholic School and the City Academy, Hackney.

== Transport ==
=== Rail ===
Homerton is served by London Overground at Homerton railway station, with westbound trains to Richmond and Clapham Junction via Dalston Junction, and eastbound trains to Stratford. The original station was opened on 1 October 1868. Services ceased on 15 May 1944 with a substitute bus service provided until official closure on 23 April 1945. Other than a partial section of wall to the north of the bridge over Barnabas Road, the original 1868 station has been demolished. Although of reduced size, the original station building would have been similar to buildings remaining at Hackney Central and Camden Road. The present basic station was opened on 13 May 1985.

=== Buses ===
Homerton is served by a large number of London Buses routes 26, 30, 236, 242, 276, 308, 388, 394, 425 and 488 as well as the W15. Homerton is also served by the London night bus network by route N26 and N242.

== References and notes ==
- Tudor Hackney (from the National Archives)
- Hackney 1795 (Hackney, The Environs of London: volume 2: County of Middlesex)
- Jacobs, Catherine I Want to Go Home (Book Guild Ltd) ISBN 1-85776-925-2 - Growing up in Homerton, a family memoir
