= Chemical X =

Chemical X may refer to:

- Chemical X (artist), a British artist
- Chemical X, a plot device in American TV series The Powerpuff Girls
- Chemical X, a short-lived professional wrestling stable consisting of Shotzi, Gigi Dolin and Tatum Paxley
- "Chemical X", a song by Cherish from The Powerpuff Girls: Power Pop (2003)
