= Ferdinand Freiligrath =

German poet, translator and liberal agitator

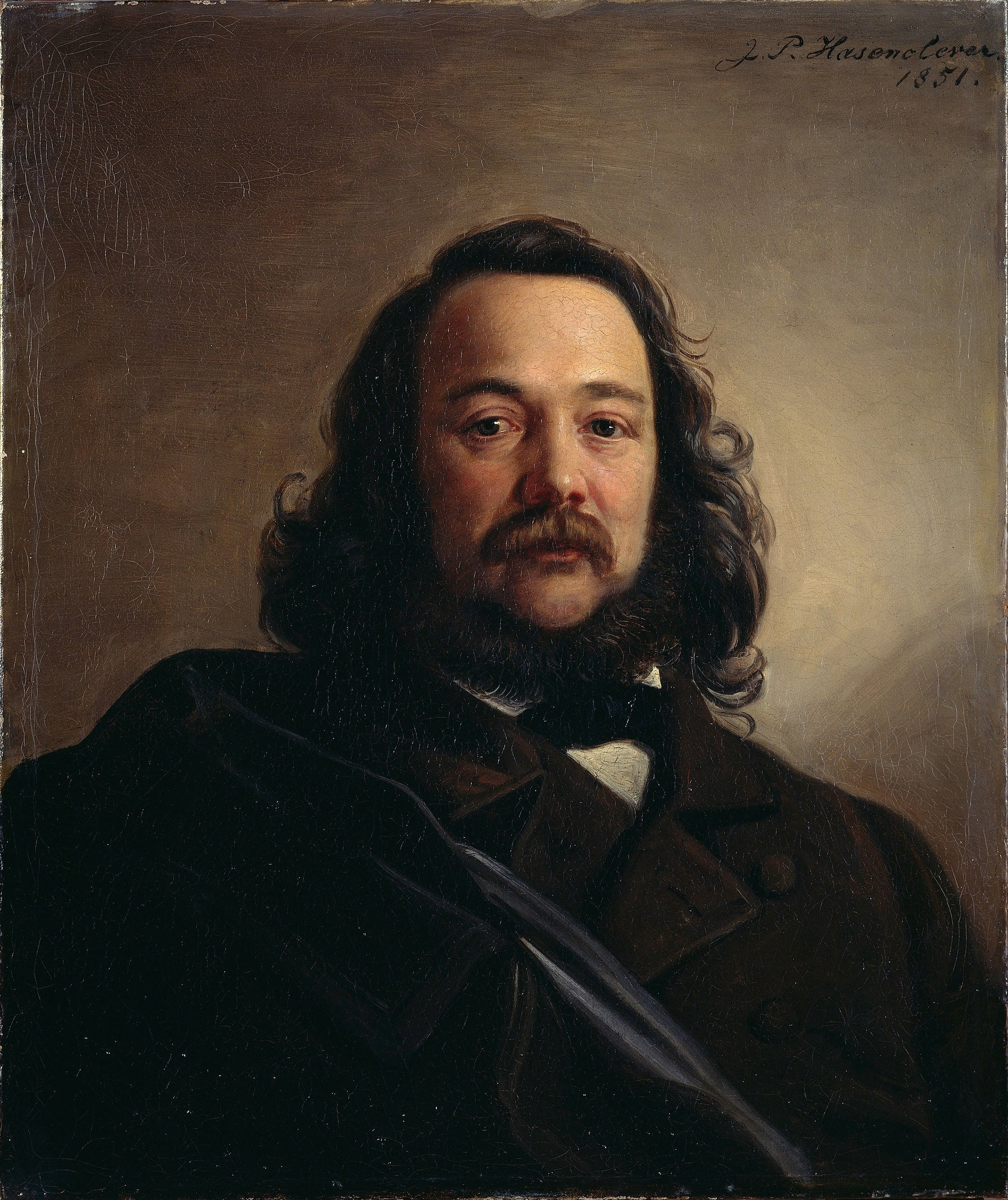
Ferdinand Freiligrath in 1851

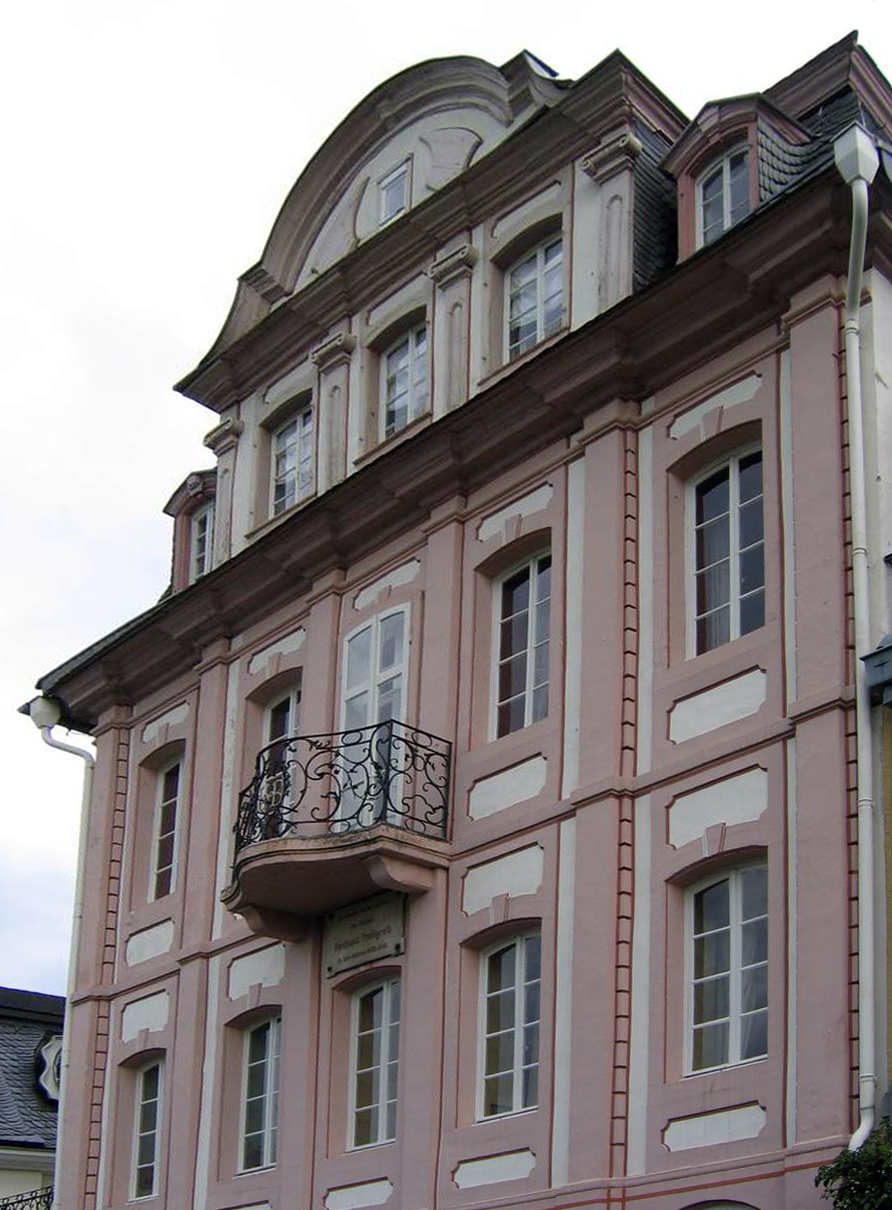
Ferdinand Freiligrath lived in Unkel 1839/40

Ferdinand Freiligrath (17 June 1810 – 18 March 1876) was a German poet, translator and liberal agitator, who is considered part of the Young Germany movement.

== Life ==
Freiligrath was born in Detmold, Principality of Lippe. His father was a teacher. He left a Detmold gymnasium at 16 to be trained for a commercial career in Soest. There he also familiarized himself with French and English literature, and before he was 20 had published verses in local journals. He worked in Amsterdam from 1831 to 1836 as a banker's clerk. After publishing translations of Victor Hugo's Odes and Chants du crépuscule, and launching a literary journal, Rheinisches Odeon (1836–38), in 1837 he started working as a bookkeeper in Barmen, where he remained until 1839. Later on, he started writing poems for the Musen-Almanach (edited by Adelbert von Chamisso and Gustav Schwab) and the Morgenblatt (ed. Cotta).

His first collection of poems (Gedichte) was published in 1838 in Mainz. This contained his poems "Löwenritt", "Prinz Eugen", and "Der Blumen Rache". His early poems were inspired by Victor Hugo's Orientales, which he also partly translated into German; they often dealt with exotic subjects. The poem "Der Mohrenfürst", for example, tells the story of a black prince who was a fierce warrior. He is defeated in battle, sold as a slave and ends up as a drummer in a circus, only the lion's skin he wore that now decorates the drum still reminding him of his previous life. This poem was set as a song by Carl Loewe.

His 1838 book of poems won immediate and wide favour, and he decided upon a literary career which he embarked upon in 1839. He cooperated in several now unimportant works, and in 1842 received a pension of 300 thalers from the Prussian king, Frederick William IV. He married, and, to be near his friend Emanuel Geibel, settled at St. Goar.

Freiligrath was a friend of the American poet Henry Wadsworth Longfellow. In 1842, when Longfellow was taking a rigorous water cure at a health spa in the former Marienberg Benedictine Convent at Boppard on the Rhine, a fellow patient introduced him to Freiligrath at the latter's home in St. Goar. Freiligrath had a special interest in English and American poetry. There followed many meetings and outings in Germany where this topic was discussed, and Longfellow presented Freiligrath with copies of his books Hyperion and Ballads and Other Poems. The friendship developed further in their correspondence.

Freiligrath had expressed beliefs that the artist should not be demeaned by becoming involved with politics and criticized the poet Georg Herwegh for his politicized poetry; however, due to political repression (censorship), and the encouragement of fellow poet Hoffmann von Fallersleben, Freiligrath later became more political. In 1844, he surrendered his pension, and in his Glaubensbekenntnis (Confession of Faith) placed his poetic gifts at the service of the democratic agitation that was to culminate in the Revolution of 1848. Such poems as "Trotz alledem" (a translation of Burns's "A man's a man for a' that"), "Die Freiheit", "Das Recht" and "Hamlet" made his absence from Germany expedient.

He left for Belgium where he met Karl Marx. From there, he proceeded to Switzerland and then to London, publishing in 1846 Englische Gedichte aus neuerer Zeit, a volume of translations, and Ça ira, a collection of political songs. He lived until 1848 in England, where he resumed his commercial career. At the invitation of Longfellow, he considered going to America, but on the short-lived triumph of liberalism returned to Germany as a democratic leader. There, he was a leader of the Democratic League in 1848, alongside Karl Marx, Wilhelm Wolff and Frederick Lessner, the last of whom became his personal friend. In 1843, Franz Liszt set Freiligrath's poem "O lieb, so lang du lieben kannst" to music, published in 1847 — the song was later arranged by Liszt for solo piano as his "Liebesträume" No. 3 (1850), which subsequently became one of his most famous piano pieces. German composer Elise Schmezer set Freiligrath's text to music in her Lieder, Romanzen und Balladen fur Tenor, opus 4.

Upon his return to Germany, Freiligrath settled in Düsseldorf, and worked for the Neue Rheinische Zeitung (general editor: Karl Marx, editor of cultural pages: Georg Weerth), a paper which he cofounded with Marx, Friedrich Engels and Wilhelm Wolff. It was not long before he had again called down upon himself the ill-will of the ruling powers by a poem, Die Toten an die Lebenden (The Dead to the Living, 1848). He was arrested on a charge of lèse-majesté, but the prosecution ended in his acquittal. This trial, in which he was acquitted, is memorable for another reason, being the first jury trial ever held in Prussia. He published Zwischen den Garben (1849) and Neue politische und soziale Gedichte (New Political and Social Poems, 1850). New difficulties arose; his association with the democratic movement rendered him an object of constant suspicion, and in 1851 he judged it more prudent to go back to London. There he became the director of the London branch of the Schweizer Generalbank and set up residence in the north-east of the city at 3 Sutton Place, Hackney. He remained in London until 1868, supporting himself by office work and poetic translations, among which were an anthology, the Rose, Thistle, and Shamrock (1854), Longfellow's Hiawatha (1857), and Shakespeare's Cymbeline and The Winter's Tale. These kept up his popularity in Germany, where in 1866 a subscription of 60,000 thalers was raised for him, partly as a political manifesto.

Back in Germany after the amnesty of 1868, Freiligrath settled first in Stuttgart and in 1875 in the neighbouring town of Cannstatt. He became a nationalist, publishing the patriotic poems "Hurrah, Germania!" and "Die Trompete von Vionville", inspired by Germany's victory in the Franco-Prussian War. His 1848 poem In Kümmernis und Dunkelheit attributed military symbolism to the colors of the German tricolor flag (which at the time stood only for the nation, not any political entity): the black was for gunpowder, the red for blood and the yellow the glow given off by the fire. He died in Cannstatt in 1876.

Among the first writers to translate Freiligrath into English was the Irish poet James Clarence Mangan (in the latter's Anthologia Germanica, no. XIX, published in the Dublin University Magazine in 1845). A selection, by his daughter, from the English translations of his poems was published in the Tauchnitz Collection of German Authors (Leipzig, 1869).

== Works ==
- Poems from the German. Edited by his daughter. 2nd copyright edition. Enlarged. Leipzig: Bernhard Tauchnitz 1871 at the Internet Archive
