= Liebesträume =

Set of three solo piano works by Franz Liszt

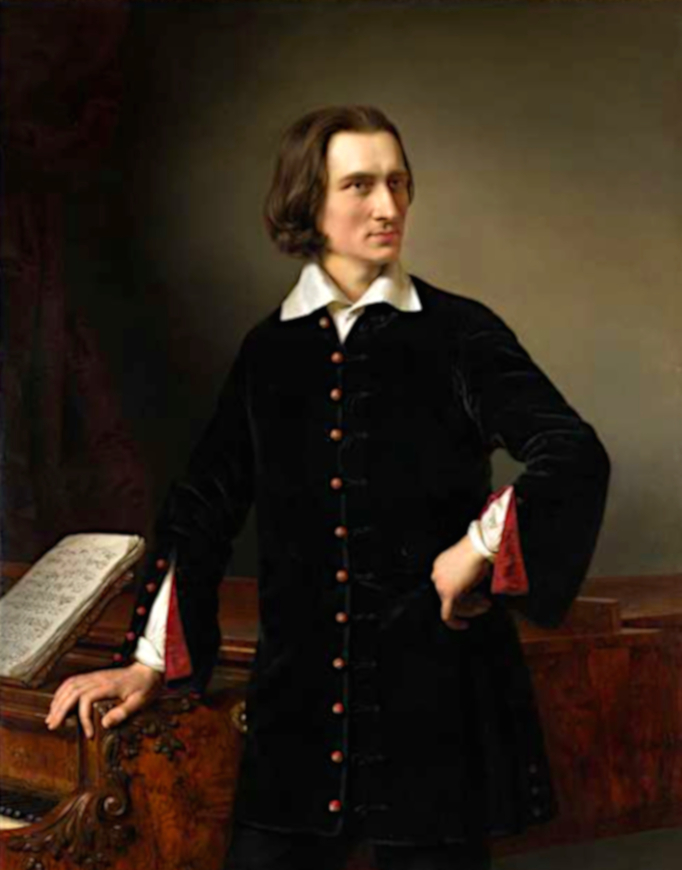
Franz Liszt, portrait by Hungarian painter Miklós Barabás, 1847

Liebesträume (German, 'Dreams of Love') is a set of three solo piano nocturnes (S.541/R.211) by Franz Liszt published in 1850. Originally the three Liebesträume were conceived as lieder after poems by Ludwig Uhland and Ferdinand Freiligrath. In 1850 two versions appeared simultaneously as a set of songs for high voice and piano, and as transcriptions for piano two-hands.

The two poems by Uhland and the one by Freiligrath depict three different forms of love. Uhland's "Hohe Liebe" (exalted love) is saintly or religious love: the "martyr" renounces worldly love and "heaven has opened its gates". The second song "Seliger Tod" (blessed death) is often known by its first line ("Gestorben war ich", "I had died"), and evokes erotic love; ("I was dead from love's bliss; I lay buried in her arms; I was wakened by her kisses; I saw heaven in her eyes"). Freiligrath's poem for the third nocturne is about unconditional mature love ("Love as long as you can!", "O lieb, so lang du lieben kannst").

== Liebestraum No. 3 ==
Liebestraum No. 3
Performed by Martha Goldstein on an 1851 Érard piano

Liebestraum No. 3 in A♭ major is the most familiar of the three nocturnes and is in three sections, each divided by a fast cadenza requiring dexterous fingerwork and a high degree of technical ability. One melody is used throughout, and varied, notably near the middle of the nocturne, at a climax, where it is played in a series of octaves and then rendered in arpeggios. A sample from the opening bars, adapted from the first edition engraving (1850), follows:
