= Sutton House, London =

Tudor manor house in Hackney, London, England

Sutton House
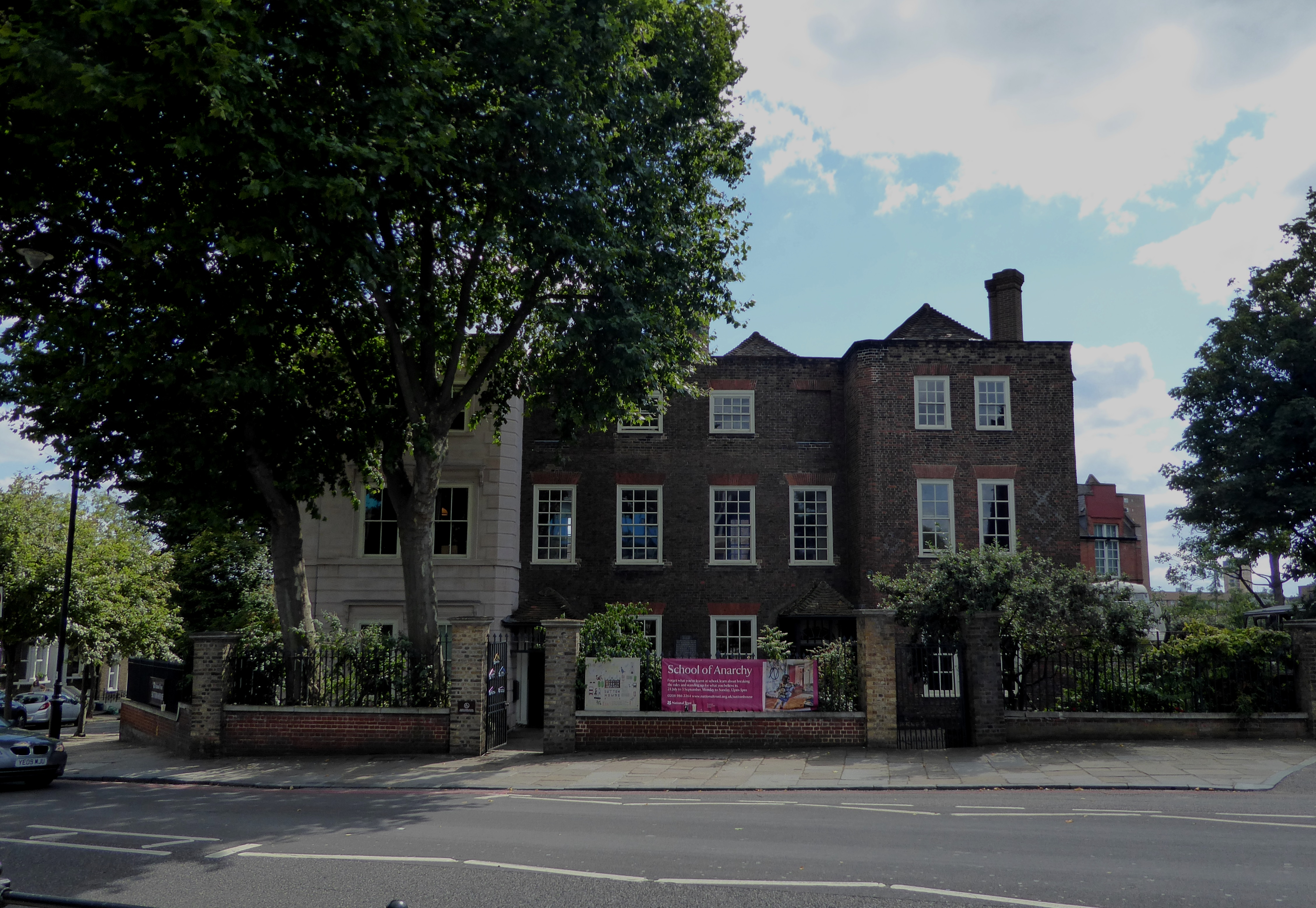
- Sutton House, the oldest house in Hackney

- Location within London Borough of Hackney
- Former names: Bryck Place

General information
- Type: Manor house
- Architectural style: Tudor
- Location: Homerton High Street; London, E9; England
- Coordinates: 51°32′54″N 0°3′1″W
- Completed: 1535; 491 years ago
- Renovated: 1993
- Client: Sir Ralph Sadler
- Owner: National Trust

Technical details
- Material: Red brick

Website
- www.nationaltrust.org.uk/sutton-house

Listed Building – Grade II*
- Designated: 23 April 1951
- Reference no.: 1226810

Sutton House is a Grade II* listed Tudor manor house in Homerton High Street, in the London Borough of Hackney. It is owned by the National Trust.

== History ==
=== 16th century ===
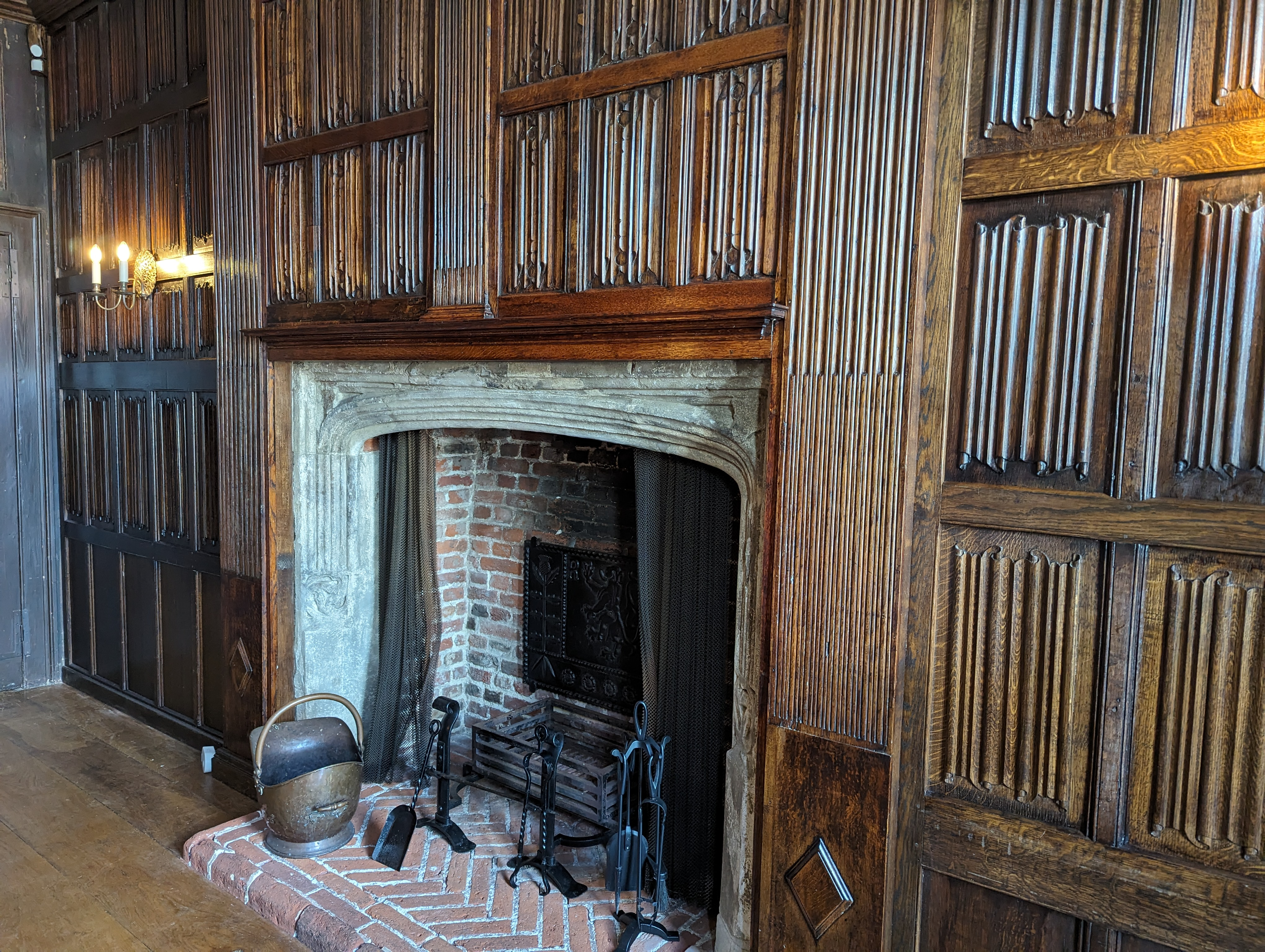
The Linenfold Parlour

Originally known as Bryck Place, Sutton House (Note: The name is a misattribution to Thomas Sutton, founder of Charterhouse School, who was another notable Hackney resident, in the adjacent Tan House. This was demolished in 1806 to allow for the extension of Sutton Place, a terrace of 16 Georgian Houses (Grade II listed).) was built in 1535 by Sir Ralph Sadler, Principal Secretary of State to Henry VIII, and is the oldest residential building in Hackney. It is a rare example of a red-brick building from the Tudor period, beginning as a three-storey H-plan structure. In 1550, having built a grander house at Standon, Hertfordshire, Sadler sold the house and surrounding estate to John Machell, a cloth merchant.

Machell, a successful businessman and member of the Clothworkers' Company, used Sutton House as country retreat from his principal London home. The rare, high-quality linen fold panelling (Note: The panelling was stolen in the 1980s while the building was derelict, but was returned to the National Trust by the salvage firm that recognised its exceptional quality.) in the parlour is likely to have been installed during his time as owner. Machell died in 1558 and the house passed to his wife Joan and his eldest son, also named John. Machell the younger lacked his father's financial acumen, and eventually lost the house in the early 1600s to James Deane, a member of the Drapers' Company, after a series of legal disputes.

=== 17th century ===
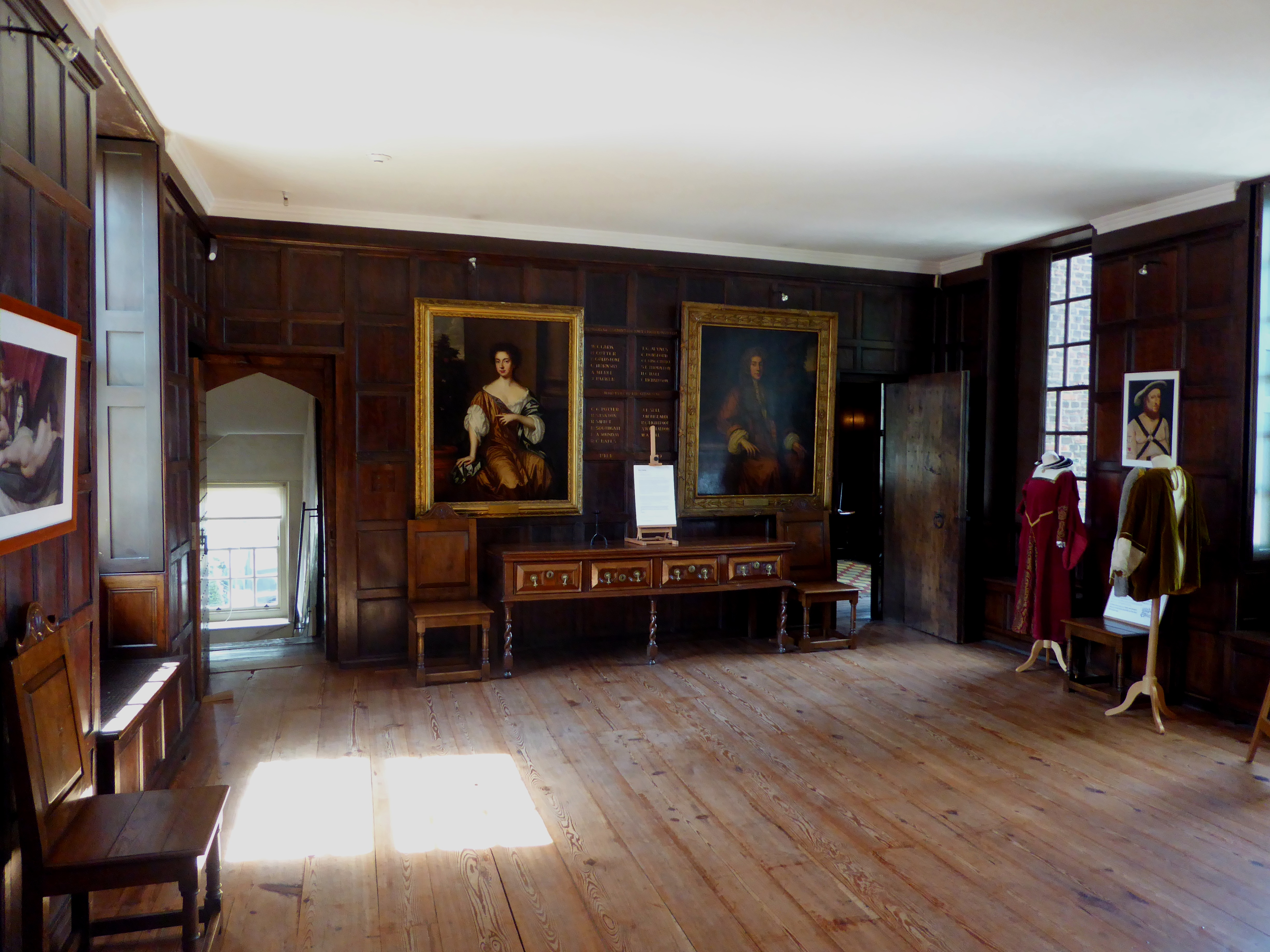
The Great Chamber

Upon Deane's death, the house passed to his niece Olive, who likely rented it to a series of tenants. In the early 1630s, the house was sold to John Milward, a member of the Vintners' Company and later a silk trader in the East India Company. After suffering financial losses, he transferred ownership of the house in 1639 to his daughter Elizabeth and her husband Edward Abbot, a member of the Drapers' Company and director of the East India Company. Abbot also lost the house due to financial difficulties, and in the 1650s the house was acquired by Henry Whittingham, who granted a lease to a prosperous widow named Sarah Freeman. Freeman opened a boarding school for girls at the house in 1657; the school, which she operated until her death in 1700, was well regarded. The ownership of the house descended through Whittingham's family to Sarah Wagstaffe, a wealthy widow with four daughters.

=== 18th century ===
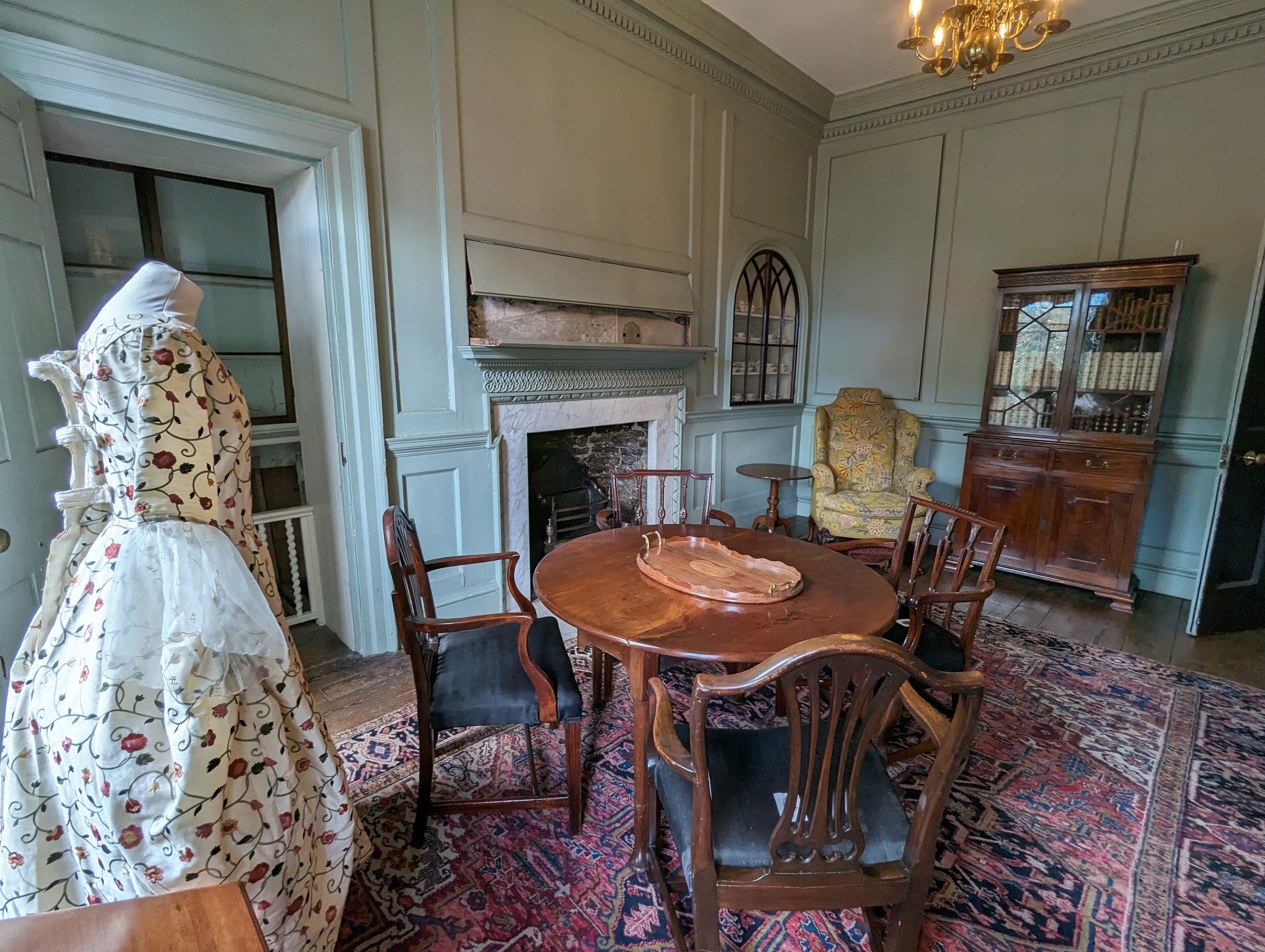
The Georgian parlour

After Sarah Freemen's death, the school continued in operation until 1740, when the lease was granted to a bricklayer and builder named John Cox who updated and later subdivided the house. By the 1750s, two tenants were listed in the property, Timothy Ravenhill and Mary Tooke, a wealthy Huguenot widow, suggesting that the house had been divided. During this period, new sash windows were installed and Georgian features were added to an expanded east wing of the house. During the second half of the century, a significant number of homes were built in the surrounding streets and the house came into the possession of the Ball family, who owned the house through several generations. During that time, the house was occupied by a succession of Huguenot tenants.

=== 19th century ===
In 1816 the house was acquired by Reverend Thomas Burnet for a boys' school, which was attended by the novelist Edward Bulwer-Lytton and Frederick Young. The building next became Milford House girls' school, which was in operation until 1875. The legal ownership of the estate had grown so complex in the prior two centuries that in the mid-1800s, the Court of Chancery was asked to rule upon the matter, ultimately defining the western half of the property as Sutton House. The surrounding estates and their gardens were increasingly replaced by more dense housing developments, which altered the nature of the area. In the 1890s, the two halves of the estate, which had become known as Picton House and Milford House, were acquired by the Church of St John-at-Hackney for the creation of a men's institute. In 1898, Fleetwood Varley, artist and descendant of Cornelius Varley, created drawings of Sutton House for the Committee for the Survey of the Memorials of Greater London, an organisation dedicated to the preservation of historic buildings. In 1904, a major campaign of restoration was completed, after the London County Council had declared the building unsafe the year prior.

=== 20th century ===
Sutton House was bought by the National Trust in the 1930s with the proceeds of a bequest made by William Alexander Robertson in memory of his two brothers killed in World War I. During World War II it was used as a centre for Fire Wardens, who kept watch from the roof. Following the war, it received little attention from the National Trust, who were focused on the Country Houses Scheme. From the 1960s it was rented by the ASTMS Union, led by its charismatic general secretary Clive Jenkins. When the union left in the early 1980s, the house fell into disrepair.

== Rescue ==
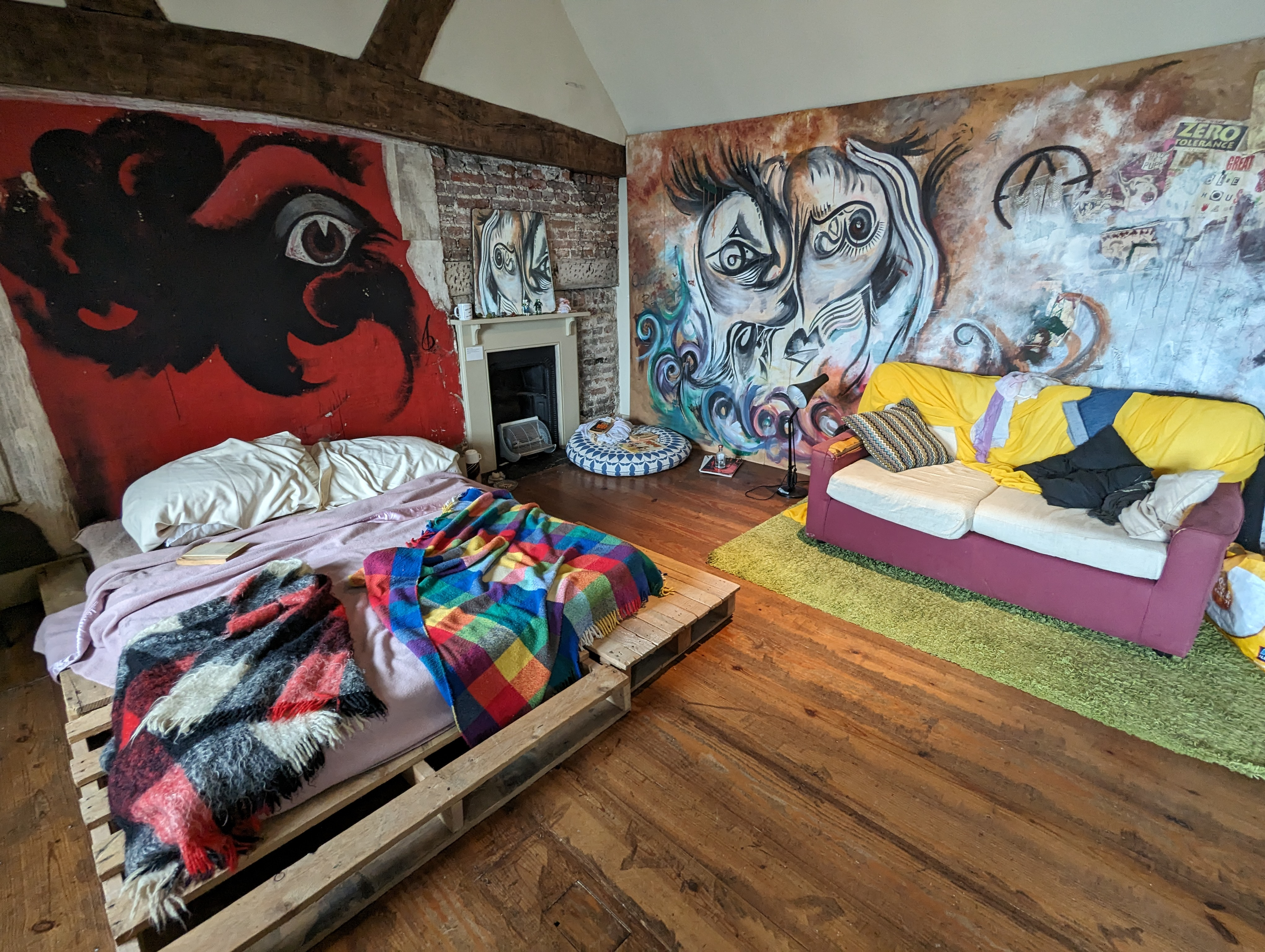
A recreated squatters' room

In the mid-1980s the building was squatted and used as a music venue and social centre, known as the Blue House (a decorated wall from this time is preserved within the current museum). After the squatters were evicted the building's condition continued to decline. The Sutton House Society, originally known as the Save Sutton House Campaign, which was formed in March 1987, then began a campaign to rescue the building and open it to the public. Renovations were completed in 1991.

The building remains in use as a museum, as well as housing a café, an art gallery and a book and gift shop. There is an active schools education programme at the house, together with other community programmes. Sutton House was long-listed for the 2004 Gulbenkian Prize. It is registered for the conduct of marriages. The restoration was completed in 1993 and the house fully opened in 1994.

== Transport ==
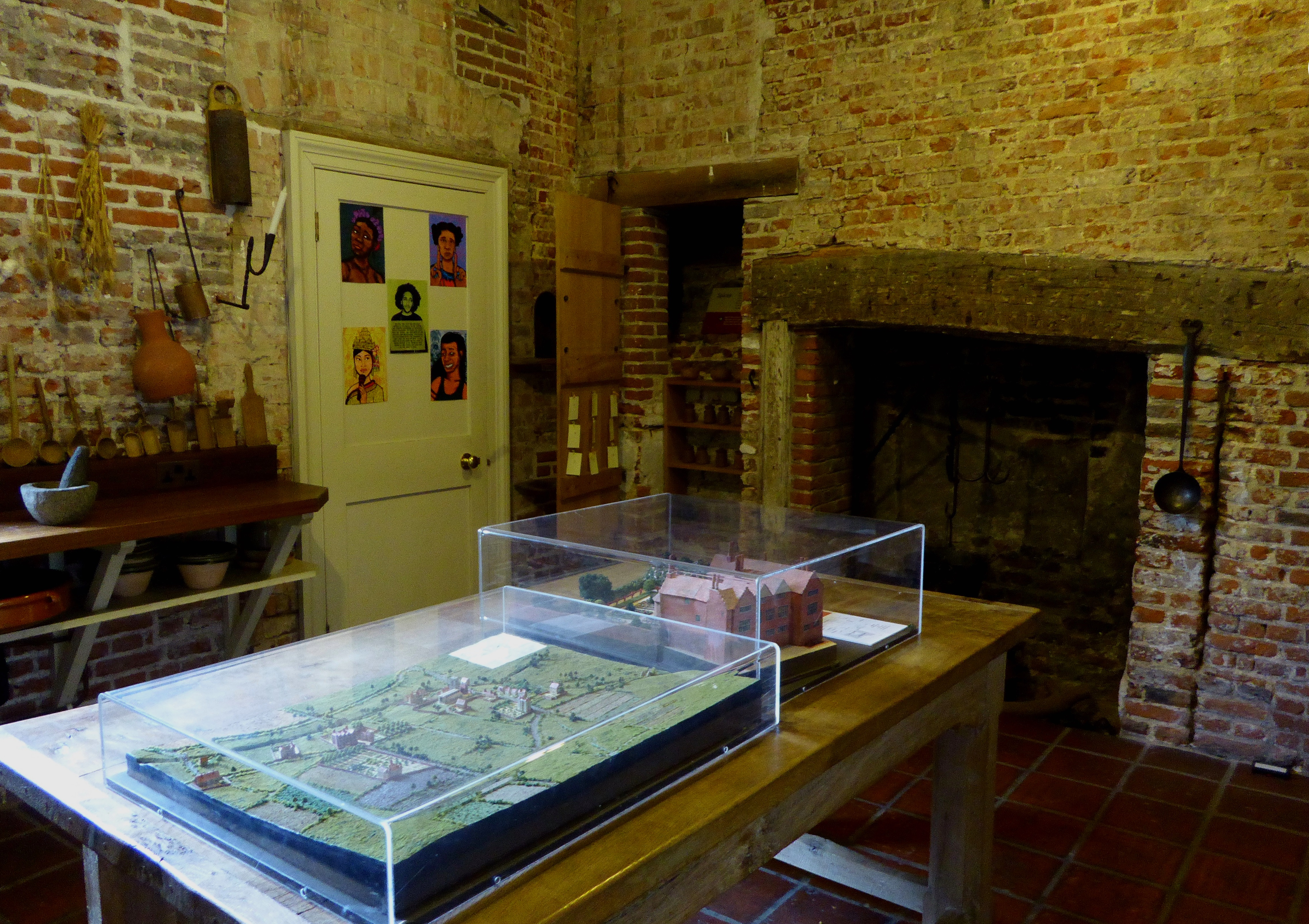
Tudor kitchen

The closest railway stations are Hackney Central station and Homerton station on the North London Line (part of the London Overground network). Many buses also stop in this area.

== Sources ==
- Belcher, Victor (2004). Sutton House : a Tudor Courtier's House in Hackney. Swindon: English Heritage. ISBN 978-1-873-59256-4.
- Hunting, Penelope (2005). "Cheyne Walk in 1899: Fleetwood Varley's Frieze". The British Art Journal. 6 (1): 52–55. ISSN 1467-2006. JSTOR 41615325.
- Wright, Patrick (2009). A Journey Through Ruins: the Last Days of London. Oxford: Oxford University Press. ISBN 978-0-199-54194-2. OCLC 1406787066.
