= Chesham Arms =

Pub in Homerton, London

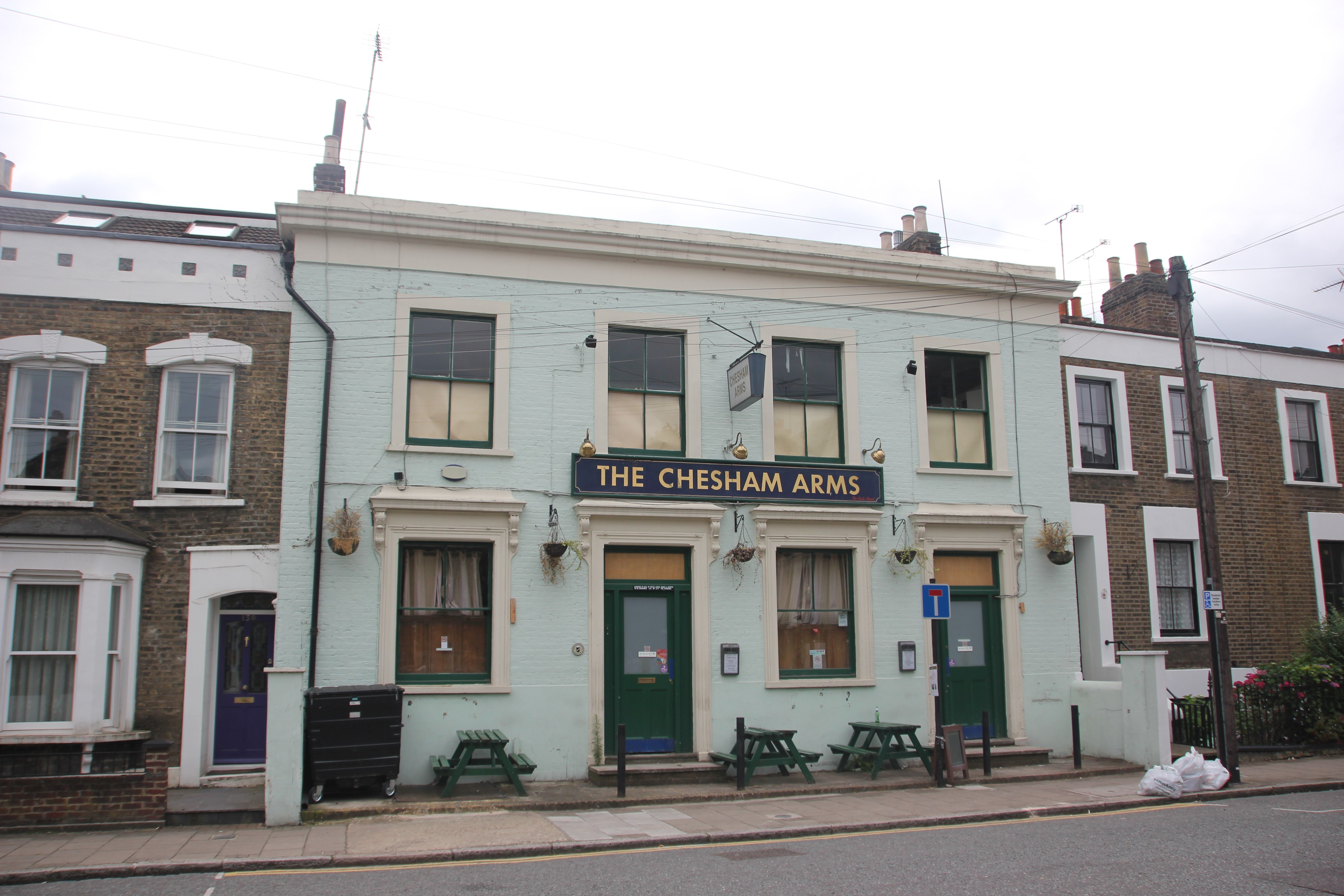

General information
- Address: 15 Mehetabel Rd, Hackney
- Town or city: London
- Country: England
- Coordinates: 51°32′51″N 0°03′00″W

Website
- www.cheshamarms.com

The Chesham Arms is a historic pub on Mehetabel Road, Homerton and in October 2014 became the London borough of Hackney's first Asset of Community Value.

There was a lengthy battle to save the pub after it closed on 4 October 2012 and was sold to Mukund Patel who wanted to turn the building into flats. However Hackney Council gave the building the protected status of an Asset of Community Value which Patel unsuccessfully challenged in a tribunal hearing.

Following a two-year legal battle by the Save The Chesham group, a lease to refurbish the pub was secured and it reopened in June 2015. Six months after reopening, 1600 members of the Campaign for Real Ale voted it the best pub in the City and East London Area.
