= O lieb, so lang du lieben kannst =

1829 poem by Ferdinand Freiligrath

"O lieb, so lang du lieben kannst" is an 1829 poem by the 19th-century German writer Ferdinand Freiligrath. Hungarian composer Franz Liszt set the first four stanzas in 1843 as a lied for soprano voice and piano, S. 298, and later adapted it into the third of his Liebesträume (Dreams of Love), S. 541.

== Text ==
O lieb', solang du lieben kannst!
O lieb', solang du lieben magst!
Die Stunde kommt, die Stunde kommt,
Wo du an Gräbern stehst und klagst!

Und sorge, daß dein Herze glüht
Und Liebe hegt und Liebe trägt,
Solang ihm noch ein ander Herz
In Liebe warm entgegenschlägt!

Und wer dir seine Brust erschließt,
O tu ihm, was du kannst, zulieb'!
Und mach' ihm jede Stunde froh,
Und mach ihm keine Stunde trüb!

Und hüte deine Zunge wohl,
Bald ist ein böses Wort gesagt!
O Gott, es war nicht bös gemeint, –
Der andre aber geht und klagt.

O lieb', solang du lieben kannst!
O lieb', solang du lieben magst!
Die Stunde kommt, die Stunde kommt,
Wo du an Gräbern stehst und klagst!

Dann kniest du nieder an der Gruft
Und birgst die Augen, trüb und naß,
– Sie sehn den andern nimmermehr –
Ins lange, feuchte Kirchhofsgras.

Und sprichst: O schau' auf mich herab,
Der hier an deinem Grabe weint!
Vergib, daß ich gekränkt dich hab'!
O Gott, es war nicht bös gemeint!

Er aber sieht und hört dich nicht,
Kommt nicht, daß du ihn froh umfängst;
Der Mund, der oft dich küßte, spricht
Nie wieder: Ich vergab dir längst!

Er tat's, vergab dir lange schon,
Doch manche heiße Träne fiel
Um dich und um dein herbes Wort –
Doch still – er ruht, er ist am Ziel!

O lieb', solang du lieben kannst!
O lieb', solang du lieben magst!
Die Stunde kommt, die Stunde kommt,
Wo du an Gräbern stehst und klagst!

O love, as long as love you can,
O love, as long as love you may,
The time will come, the time will come
When you will stand at the grave and mourn!

Be sure that your heart burns,
And holds and keeps love
As long as another heart beats warmly
With its love for you

And if someone bears his soul to you
Love him back as best you can
Give his every hour joy,
Let him pass none in sorrow!

And guard your words with care,
Lest harm flow from your lips!
Dear God, I meant no harm,
But the loved one recoils and mourns.

O love, love as long as you can!
O love, love as long as you may!
The time will come, the time will come,
When you will stand at the grave and mourn.

You will kneel alongside the grave
And your eyes will be sorrowful and moist,
– Never will you see the beloved again –
Only the churchyard's tall, wet grass.

You will say: Look at me from below,
I who mourn here alongside your grave!
Forgive my slights!
Dear God, I meant no harm!

Yet the beloved does not see or hear you,
He lies beyond your comfort;
The lips you kissed so often speak
Not again: I forgave you long ago!

Indeed, he did forgive you,
But tears he would freely shed,
Over you and on your unthinking word –
Quiet now! – he rests, he has passed.

O love, love as long as you can!
O love, love as long as you may!
The time will come, the time will come,
When you will stand at the grave and mourn.
