= Sutton Place, Hackney =

Street in Hackney, London

Coordinates: 51°32′54″N 0°3′1″W

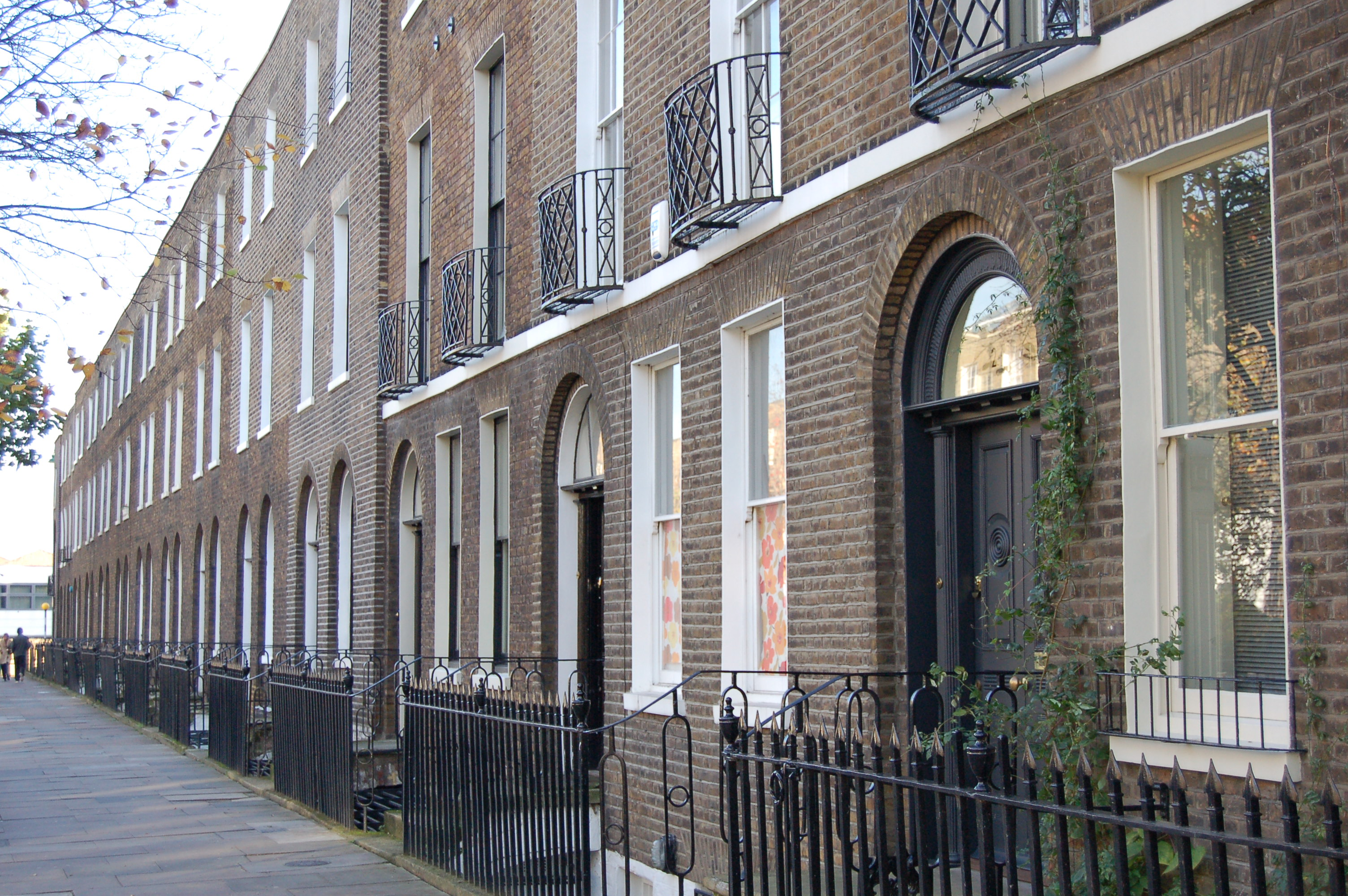
Sutton Place, Grade II listed terrace 1790–1806 in Hackney. (November 2005)

Sutton Place, is a small street in the London Borough of Hackney. It links Homerton High Street with St John's Church Gardens, in Hackney. The Georgian terrace of 1790–1806, is Grade II listed as a whole, together with the villas on the north side of the street which date from 1820, and is sited in the conservation area around the gardens of St John-at-Hackney. The street replaced Church Path, an historic path connecting the villages of Homerton and Hackney.

== History ==
=== Description ===
On the south side, is a stock-brick three-storeyed terrace of Georgian houses built by Charterhouse. The terrace was likely to have been designed by its inhouse surveyor, William Pilkington, between 1790 and 1806. It was then leased to William Collins in 1809. The terrace replaced a school in the large medieval Tan House (occupied by Thomas Sutton in Tudor times) which occupied the site at the east end of the terrace – next to Sutton House. Sutton Place was constructed along the line of the short path across Church field, connecting Upper Homerton with the parish church of St John-at-Hackney.

The terrace is 'soot washed'. This was a technique whereby the entire frontage was given a coating of soot, before fine white lining was applied to the darkened mortar between the bricks. This gave the appearance of much finer brickwork. The terrace appears uniform, but numbers 1 2 3 & 4 are the earlier and finer houses, with 'barrel' backs. Wrought iron railings and a light well separate the frontages from the street, with under pavement cellars for each house. It is a condition of the listing that external decoration must be black. This emphasises the austere look of the terrace.

=== Georgian life ===
As many as three servants would live and work in the basement of each house, hauling coal from the cellars to the grates in the upper house. The basements would have consisted of a small sitting (and sleeping) room, together with a kitchen at the back; with all the household cooking performed on a small range. Because this was such a small space, many of the washing and cooking activities took place in a range of small sheds at the rear of the buildings.

At the rear of the houses are long gardens leading to a nightsoil path. This was for the removal of waste from the houses, which would be collected by cart. Main sewerage appears to have arrived with the culverting of Hackney Brook in about 1847, which is reputed to run in a large cast iron tube through the back gardens, before turning South down Isabella Road to join the main sewer network at Old Ford.

Lead was stolen from the roof, of one of the houses under construction, on the night of 22 December 1808. The perpetrator was sentenced to be publicly whipped in Hackney Village and to one year in the House of Correction.

At each end of the terrace were two yards, for carriages and horses. The one adjacent to Sutton House was for many years a car breakers and repair garage (Taiko Autos) but has been acquired by the National Trust and turned into a garden for visitors called the Breaker's Yard, which includes features commemorating its former use.

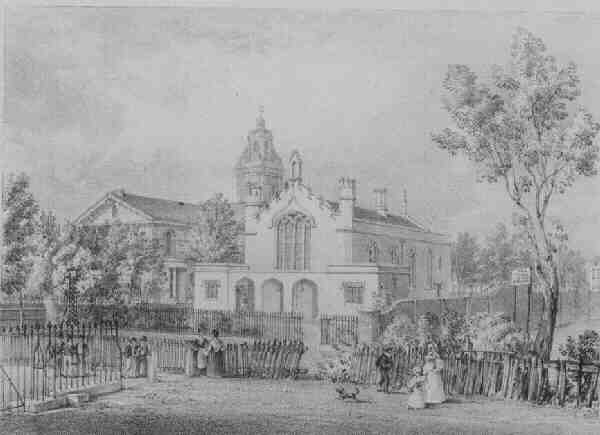
circa 1835, print of the Grammar School, with the new church in the background

=== Hackney Grammar school ===
The Hackney Proprietary Grammar school opened in 1830, on the north side of the street, adjacent to St John's churchyard, providing education for 130 boys. The Madras system was used, whereby elder boys were appointed monitors to take responsibility for the younger boys. The school caused controversy for the number of non-conformist teachers and for a notorious ban on the sons of shopkeepers. By 1840, the school had declined to an entry of 50 pupils and was amalgamated with the Church of England Grammar school (on a site now occupied by a part of the Pembury Estate). The school building became a private building known as Sutton Lodge, and by the 1950s was demolished to extend the adjacent Metal Box factory.

=== Later use ===
The north side of the street consists of villas built in 1820, also listed. There are two small blocks of flats at either end of the north side, filling in gaps in the terrace, but in keeping with the villas.

The street survives intact, as it remained in the ownership of Charterhouse into the 20th century. Then it passed to the Metal Box Company, who developed a factory behind the buildings on the north side. The (unsightly) office block on the north-western corner was built to service the factory, on the site of the former Hackney Grammar School. The core of the Metal Box site became the award-winning Sutton Square, private development.

Originally, the street was occupied by wealthy merchants and gentry, including at least one mayor of Hackney and the exiled German poet and revolutionary Ferdinand Freiligrath. However, in the early 20th century was leased to institutions, including one for the 'training of domestic servants' (a M.A.B.Y.S. home, Metropolitan Association for Befriending Young Servants, actually an attempt to save poor girls from a life of prostitution). They fell into multiple occupation, and might have been demolished, but for their listing. From the 1970s individual private owners have endeavoured to restore the houses. A notable recent resident was Colin Firth, and Sutton Place has itself appeared in the 2003 film, The Hours.

Unusually, the street retains the original practice of sequentially numbering adjacent buildings (rather than grouping evens and odds). A Victorian postbox remains at the Homerton end of the street.

== See also ==
- Sutton House
- Homerton
- Hackney Central
