= In Kümmernis und Dunkelheit =

"In Kümmernis und Dunkelheit" or "Schwarz-Rot-Gold" is a revolutionary poem by Ferdinand Freiligrath written on 17 March 1848 in London and later set to music by Robert Schumann.

== History ==
In 1848, the German revolution began. Liberal pressure spread through many of the German states, each of which experienced the revolutions in its own way. The street demonstrations of workers and artisans in Paris, France, from February 22 through 24, 1848, resulted in the abdication of King Louis Philippe and his departure from France to live in Britain, was the immediate spur to revolt in Germany. The revolution spread across Europe and started in Germany with the large demonstrations on March 13, 1848, in Vienna, Austria, which resulted in the resignation of Prince von Metternich as chief minister to Emperor Ferdinand I of Austria and his departure from Austria to live in Britain. Because of the date of these demonstrations, the revolutions in Germany are usually called the March Revolution (German: Märzrevolution).

On 17 March 1848, Ferdinand Freiligrath wrote a poem dedicated to these events. It incites all Germans to take up arms in order to liberate Germany from its princes and create a unified German republic under the black, red and golden flag. The poem was set to music by Robert Schumann on 4 April 1848.

== Lyrics ==
In Kümmernis und Dunkelheit,
Da mußten wir sie bergen!
Nun haben wir sie doch befreit,
Befreit aus ihren Särgen!
Ha, wie das blitzt und rauscht und rollt!
Hurra, du Schwarz, du Rot, du Gold!
Pulver ist schwarz,
Blut ist rot,
Golden flackert die Flamme!

Das ist das alte Reichspanier,
Das sind die alten Farben!
Darunter haun und holen wir
Uns bald wohl junge Narben!
Denn erst der Anfang ist gemacht,
Noch steht bevor die letzte Schlacht!
Pulver ist schwarz,
Blut ist rot,
Golden flackert die Flamme!

Ja, die das Banner ihr gestickt,
Ihr Jungfern unverdrossen,
Derweil am Feuer wir gebückt
Uns Flintenkugeln gossen:
Nicht, wo man singt nur oder tanzt,
Geschwungen sei’s und aufgepflanzt! –
Pulver ist schwarz,
Blut ist rot,
Golden flackert die Flamme!

Denn das ist noch die Freiheit nicht,
Die Deutschland muß begnaden,
Wenn eine Stadt in Waffen spricht
Und hinter Barrikaden:
„Kurfürst, verleih! Sonst – hüte dich! –
Sonst werden wir – – großherzoglich!“
Pulver ist schwarz,
Blut ist rot,
Golden flackert die Flamme!

Das ist noch lang die Freiheit nicht,
Die ungeteilte, ganze,
Wenn man ein Zeughaustor erbricht,
Und Schwert sich nimmt und Lanze;
Sodann ein weniges sie schwingt,
Und – folgsamlich zurück sie bringt!
Pulver ist schwarz,
Blut ist rot,
Golden flackert die Flamme!

Das ist noch lang die Freiheit nicht,
Wenn ihr an Brockhaus’ Glase
Ausübt ein klirrend Strafgericht
Ob einer Dresdner Nase!
Was liegt euch an dem Sosius?
Drauf: – in die Hofburg Stein und Schuß!
Pulver ist schwarz,
Blut ist rot,
Golden flackert die Flamme!

Das ist noch lang die Freiheit nicht,
Wenn man, statt Patronen,
Mit keiner andern Waffe ficht,
Als mit Petitionen!
Du lieber Gott: – Petitioniert!
Parlamentiert, illuminiert!
Pulver ist schwarz,
Blut ist rot,
Golden flackert die Flamme!

Das ist noch lang die Freiheit nicht,
Sein Recht als Gnade nehmen
Von Buben, die zu Recht und Pflicht
Aus Furcht nur sich bequemen!
Auch nicht: daß, die ihr gründlich haßt,
Ihr dennoch auf den Thronen laßt!
Pulver ist schwarz,
Blut ist rot,
Golden flackert die Flamme!

Die Freiheit ist die Nation,
Ist aller gleich Gebieten!
Die Freiheit ist die Auktion
Von dreißig Fürstenhüten!
Die Freiheit ist die Republik!
Und abermals: die Republik!
Pulver ist schwarz,
Blut ist rot,
Golden flackert die Flamme!

Die eine deutsche Republik,
Die mußt du noch erfliegen!
Mußt jeden Strick und Galgenstrick
Dreifarbig noch besiegen!
Das ist der große letzte Strauß –
Flieg aus, du deutsch Panier, flieg aus!
Pulver ist schwarz,
Blut ist rot,
Golden flackert die Flamme!

Zum Kampfe denn, zum Kampfe jetzt!
Der Kampf nur gibt dir Weihe!
Und kehrst du rauchig und zerfetzt,
So stickt man dich aufs neue!
Nicht wahr, ihr deutschen Jungfräulein?
Hurra, das wird ein Sticken sein!
Pulver ist schwarz,
Blut ist rot,
Golden flackert die Flamme!

Und der das Lied für euch erfand
In einer dieser Nächte,
Der wollte, daß ein Musikant
Es bald in Noten brächte!
Heißt das: ein rechter Musikant!
Dann kläng es hell durchs deutsche Land:
Pulver ist schwarz,
Blut ist rot,
Golden flackert die Flamme!

Translation:

In grievance and darkness
We had to recover the colours!
Now we have finally delivered them
From their coffins.
Alas, this sparkles and whooshes and rolls!
Hooray, you Black, you Red, and you Gold!
Powder is black,
Blood is red,
And golden flickers the flame!

This is the old banner of the empire,
These are the old colours,
Under which we are going to
Get new scars anon!
Now is just the beginning,
The final battle still awaits us!
Powder is black,
Blood is red,
And golden flickers the flame!

Yes, you who have embroidered the banner,
You assiduous damsels,
Whilst we were bent over the fireplace,
Casting bullets for our rifles:
The banner shall be flown and planted thereon,
But not where people only sing or dance.
Powder is black,
Blood is red,
And golden flickers the flame!

It is not yet the freedom
That must shed its grace on Germany
If an armed city says
Behind barricades:
"Prince-elector, grant! Otherwise – take care! –
Otherwise we will become – – part of the Grand Duchy!"
Powder is black,
Blood is red,
And golden flickers the flame!

This is not freedom for a long time yet,
The undivided, whole freedom,
When the gate of the armoury is opened
And the people takes swords and lances,
Thereafter brandishing them for a while,
But finally bringing them back obediently!
Powder is black,
Blood is red,
And golden flickers the flame!

This is not freedom for a long time yet,
When you put Brockhaus's windows
To clanking trial
Due to a Dresden nose!
Why do you care for Sosius?
Attack: – stone and bullet for the Hofburg!
Powder is black,
Blood is red,
And golden flickers the flame!

This is not freedom for a long time yet,
If you fight with petitions
In lieu of bullets
Or other weapons!
O dear God: – Petitioned!
Discussed, illuminated!
Powder is black,
Blood is red,
And golden flickers the flame!

This is not freedom for a long time yet,
If you receive your rights as a grace
From thugs who only act
Righteously and dutifully for fear!
And it is not: if you leave those you dearly hate
On their thrones nonetheless!
Powder is black,
Blood is red,
And golden flickers the flame!

Freedom is the nation,
A government by everyone!
Freedom is the sale
Of thirty crowns of princes!
Freedom is the Republic!
And once again: the Republic!
Powder is black,
Blood is red,
And golden flickers the flame!

The one German republic,
Thou still hast to build!
Thou still hast to conquer every gibbet rope
With thy three colours!
This is the big last task –
Fly, German banner, fly!
Powder is black,
Blood is red,
And golden flickers the flame!

To battle then, to battle now!
Only combat sanctifies thee!
And if thou returnst fumy and in tatters,
Thou wilt be sent back anew!
Is it not true, German damsels?
Hooray, what an embroidery!
Powder is black,
Blood is red,
And golden flickers the flame!

The one who wrote this poem
In one of these nights
Wanted it soon to be set to music
By a musician!
Which means: by a good musician!
Then, it would sound throughout Germany:
Powder is black,
Blood is red,
And golden flickers the flame!

== See also ==
- Regina (Lortzing)
