= Ministry of Sound =

British entertainment business

Coordinates: 51°29′52″N 0°6′0″W

- Type: Limited company
- Industry: Nightclub; Music; Entertainment; Events; Lifestyle; Private members' club
- Founded: September 21, 1991; 35 years ago
- Founders: James Palumbo; Justin Berkmann; Humphrey Waterhouse
- Headquarters: 103 Gaunt Street London SE1 6DP, England, UK
- Key people: Lohan Presencer (chairman)
- Website: ministryofsound.com

Ministry of Sound or Ministry of Sound Group is a British multimedia entertainment business based in London with a nightclub, shared workspace and private members' club, worldwide events operation, music publishing business and fitness studio.

James Palumbo is the co-founder and former chairman and CEO of the Group. He handed over the day-to-day running of the business to Lohan Presencer in 2008. In 2018, Presencer became chairman.

== Nightclub ==
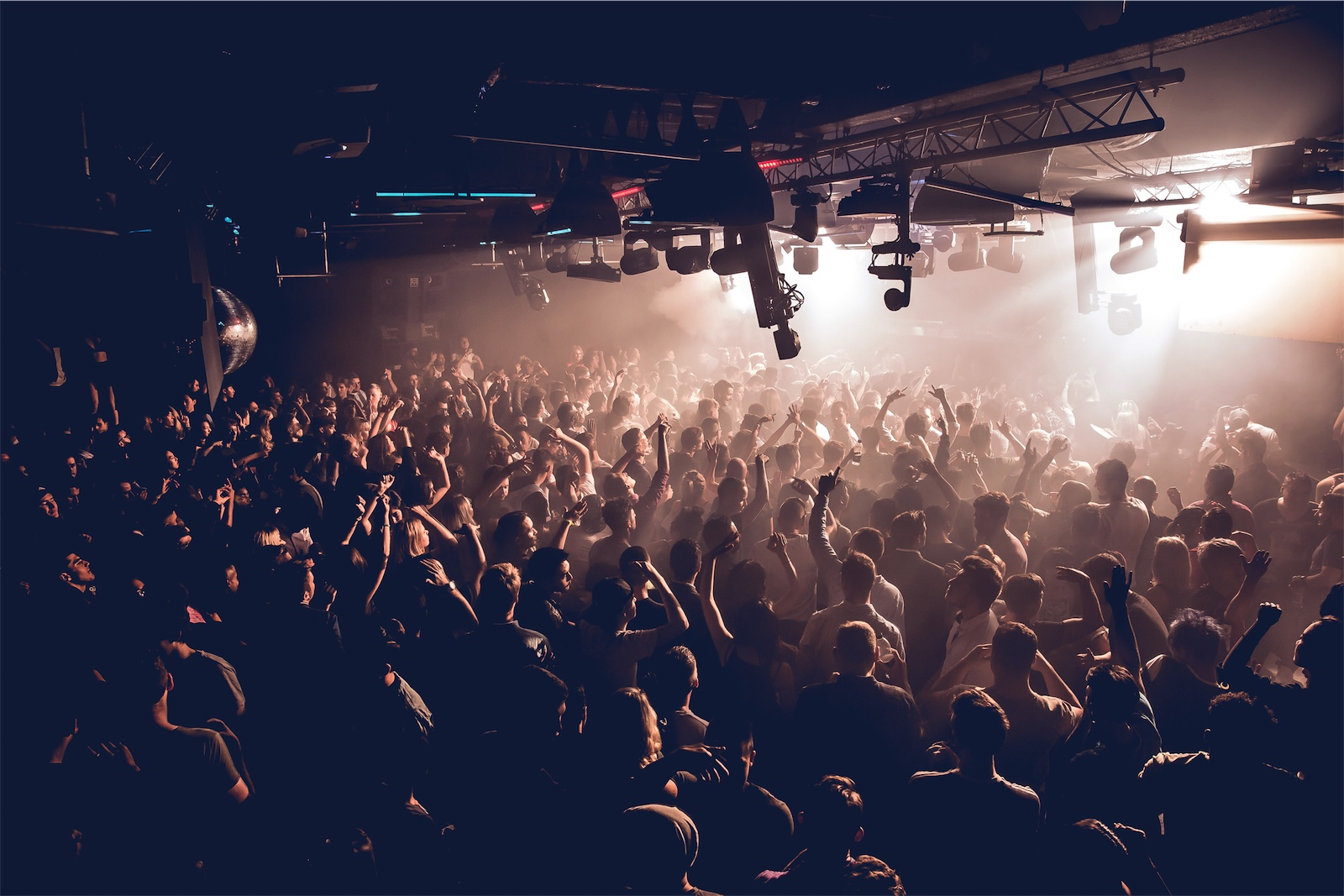
The Box (main room) at Ministry of Sound

Ministry of Sound began as the idea of Justin Berkmann. Inspired by New York's Paradise Garage – which he described as "an amazing club. It had lights, darkness, music, quiet – everything you wanted". As opposed to striking a balance between the typical hallmarks of a live music venue, Ministry of Sound was conceived as an arena purely dedicated to sound. Berkmann stated: "My concept for Ministry was purely this: 100% sound system first, lights second, design third (in that order); the reverse of everyone else's idea."

They spent £500,000 on the club's sound system, and the same amount again on soundproofing the club using magnesite: they wanted to be able to turn the sound system up as loud as possible without disturbing the neighbours, and tested it to a volume of 156 decibels without the sound leaking outside. In addition to drawing inspiration from the Paradise Garage, the club borrowed the idea of using changing set designs from another New York City club, Area, with the first being based around Blade Runner, Berkmann's favourite film.

Berkmann was introduced to James Palumbo, who was working in property finance at the time, by Humphrey Waterhouse to realise the concept. The site, a disused bus garage, is located in Elephant & Castle in Southwark, London. The club opened on 21 September 1991 and has remained in this location since. Having considered "a load of daft names" for the club, including Get Off My Foot and The Ghost and Mrs Chicken, Berkmann came up with Ministry of Sound after walking past the Ministry of Defence Main Building.

With opening sets from American house and garage DJs Larry Levan, David Morales, Roger Sanchez and Tony Humphries, as well as Paul Oakenfold, Ministry of Sound grew as a clubbing venue. According to Berkmann, it managed to empty rival nightclub Tramp for its first six months by drawing its celebrity clientele, before "they stopped coming and it was more about the dance music community". It now attracts around 300,000 clubbers per year, and has hosted sets from popular DJs including: Adam Beyer, DJ Harvey, Dixon, Marshmello, Jozeff and Pete Tong. It has won the IDMA 'World's Best Sound System' award four years in a row - every year they ran the category.

The capacity of The Box (the main room) is 600 people, and there are other smaller rooms within the club. There are three weekly club nights: Fridays feature Lock n Load brand The Gallery which are primarily trance music. Saturdays host a number of club nights which are primarily house music. In 2016, these included Defected, Glitterbox, Rinse FM, Hospitality and Together. On Tuesday, the club hosts a student session called Milkshake, established in 2002.

=== Threat of closure ===
Ministry of Sound's existence has been threatened on a number of occasions by nearby redevelopment in Elephant & Castle. The most notable concerned the redevelopment of Eileen House, a tower block opposite the nightclub's entrance. From 2009 to 2014, Ministry of Sound fought various public campaigns to save the club from the threat of closure. These culminated in a hearing before then-Mayor of London Boris Johnson at City Hall in November 2013. In December 2013, a legal deal was agreed between Ministry of Sound and the developer Oakmayne to enable Eileen House to be redeveloped without jeopardizing the club's future.

=== Dolby Atmos ===
In 2016, Ministry of Sound partnered with Dolby Laboratories to bring surround sound Dolby Atmos to the nightclub, a first in the industry. The Box, Ministry of Sound's main room, now boasts a 64-speaker, 22-channel sound system, allowing the artists to control where certain sounds are sent across the space.

== The Ministry ==
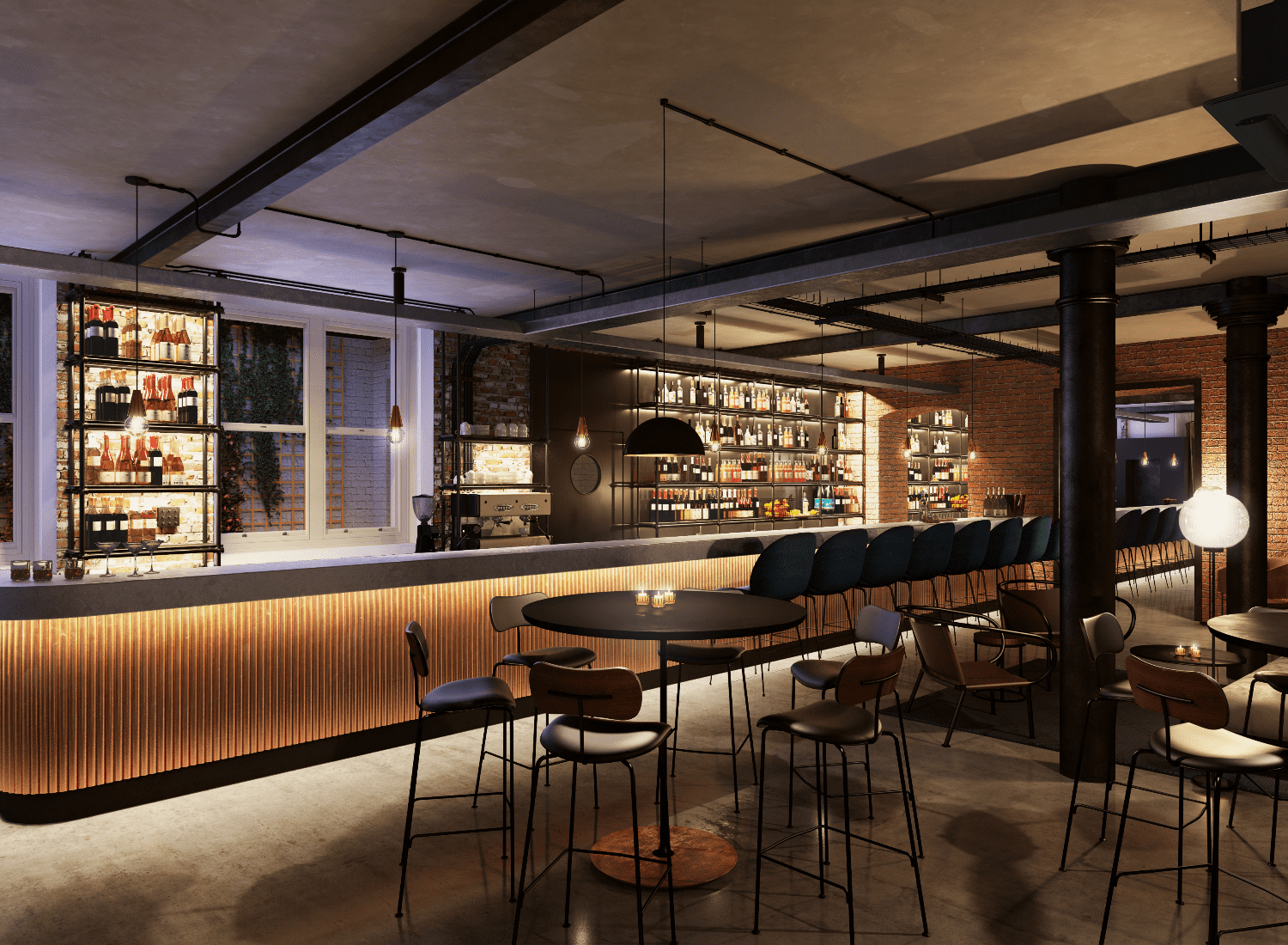
Bar render at The Ministry, 79 Borough Road

The Ministry is a new members' club and shared workspace for creative businesses, which opened in 2018 in London. The first building on Borough Road includes four floors of tailored private offices, shared working areas, meeting spaces, soundproof studios, an immersive tech suite, a full-service restaurant, a bar 70 feet in length, an outdoor terrace, a 40-seater cinema and an events space with a diverse events programme.

== Tours ==
Under its Ministry of Sound and Hed Kandi brands, the business hosts approximately 500 international tour events annually across the world. In 2017, the brand featured as part of the stage line-up at festivals including The Ark (cruise ship), Adria Summer Festival and Ultra Europe.

== Fitness ==
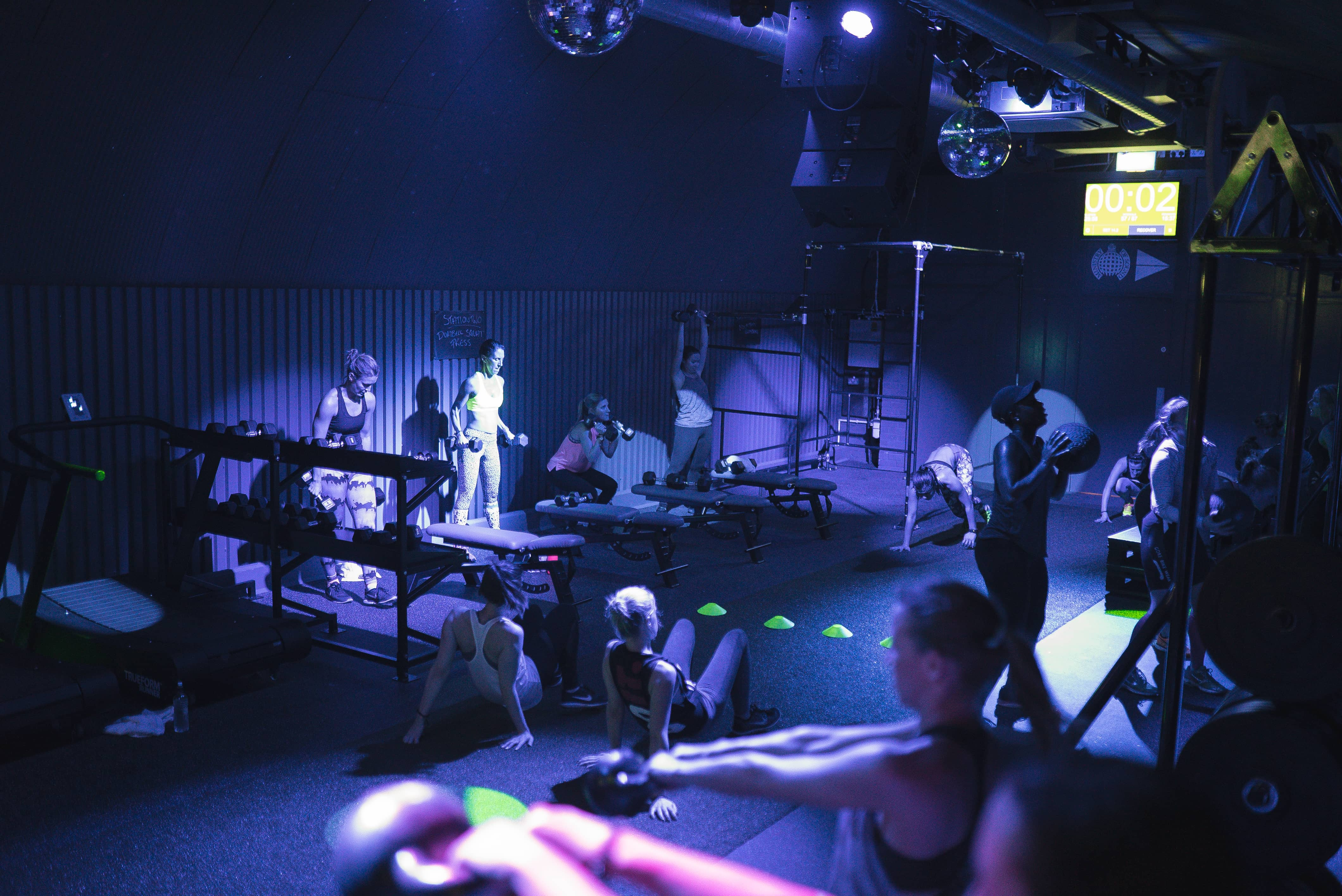
A Ministry of Sound Fitness class

The fitness studio (previously the club's back-of-house vault where the alcohol was stored) opened in February 2017. The concept takes a club-style sound system and lighting rig and pairs it with a bespoke, instructor-led high intensity interval workout. Classes run from Monday to Sunday, and an on-site bar offers a range of drinks from protein shakes to alcoholic cocktails.

== Music publishing ==
The music publishing business was established in 2015. It is independent of the record label that was acquired by Sony Music, and is headed up by Ben Bodie. The current roster of artists includes Mura Masa, iLL BLU, Will Arcane, KDA and John Calvert.

== Record label ==
=== Ownership ===
In August 2016, Ministry of Sound's A&R and compilations recorded music business were acquired by Sony Music. Rights to all recordings under the Ministry of Sound name are now held and mostly distributed by Sony Music, excluding the London Grammar catalogue which is distributed by Universal Music Group in most of the world and Because Music in France, with the remaining Ministry of Sound businesses retained within the original group.

Ministry of Sound was an independent record label split into two divisions: Artist & Repertoire and Compilations.

=== Artist repertoire ===
The Artist & Repertoire division was established in the early 1990s with releases on a 'Sound of Ministry' label imprint. Sound of Ministry was superseded by in-house labels Open, Data, Substance, Smoove and Rulin', which between them released a string of UK and international chart hits.

In 2009, the artist labels were consolidated under 'Ministry of Sound Recordings'. The first artist signed was Example, who achieved two UK number 1 records, three top 10s, two top 20s, two gold albums and one platinum number 1 selling album, Playing in the Shadows. Other notable label signings include Wretch 32, DJ Fresh and, more recently, London Grammar, whose debut album If You Wait reached platinum sales status in the UK, gold status in France and was number 1 on the iTunes Album Chart in Australia.

In 2014, London Grammar were nominated for 'British Breakthrough Act' at the BRIT Awards. If You Wait was also named iTunes 'Album of the Year 2013' The artist label also continue to release dance singles, achieving three number 1 records in the UK in 2013 with Bingo Players feat. Far East Movement's "Get Up (Rattle)", Duke Dumont feat. A*M*E's "Need U (100%)", and Storm Queen's "Look Right Through".

=== Compilations ===
The compilations business was first established in 1993 with the release of Sessions Volume One, a compilation album of dance music mixed by Tony Humphries. The album was a commercial success. The business has now sold more than 55 million compilation albums worldwide.

== Radio show ==
Ministry of Sound Radio was an online-only service broadcasting 24-hours a day from Ministry of Sound's offices adjacent to the nightclub.

== See also ==
- The Annual
- Chillout Sessions
- Sessions (compilation series)
- List of electronic dance music venues
- Superclub
- Ministry of Sound Australia
- Sony Music
- Privilege Ibiza
- Miniscule of Sound
- Chemical X (artist)
