= Chemical X (artist) =

British contemporary artist

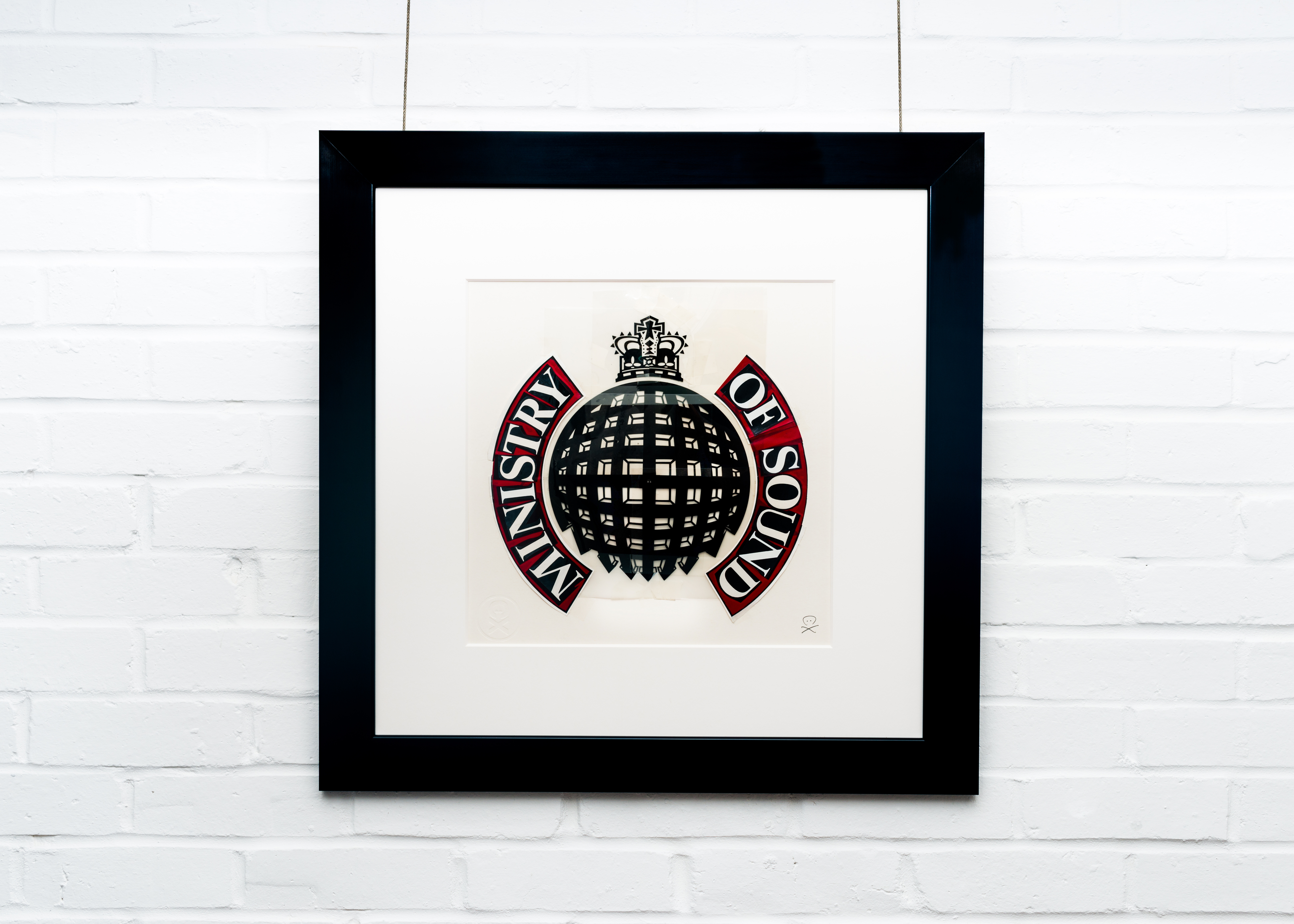
Chemical X's original artwork for the Ministry of Sound logo

Chemical X is a pseudonymous British contemporary artist. His main works to date have addressed British rave culture via his 'Ecstasy Collection' and the plight of the homeless community of Skid Row in Los Angeles via the installation 'Skid Rodeo Drive.

== Career ==
=== Prior to 2013 ===
Chemical X is credited as the designer of the original logo for the Ministry of Sound nightclub and record label in 1991.

In 2002 Chemical X, via the creative agency Third Planet International, worked alongside another British anonymous artist Banksy on two projects, starting with the Greenpeace campaign Save or Delete in which the final campaign image was a collaboration between the two artists.

=== 2013–2021 ===
Chemical X's first show was 'THE ARK', a group exhibition at the Crypt On The Green in Clerkenwell, London in 2014 curated by the now defunct Bear Cub Gallery. The exhibition highlighted the plight of endangered species and supported the International Union for Conservation of Nature.

On 28 September 2017, Chemical X held his inaugural solo exhibition, 'CX300', showcasing the 'Ecstasy Collection', in London's Soho.

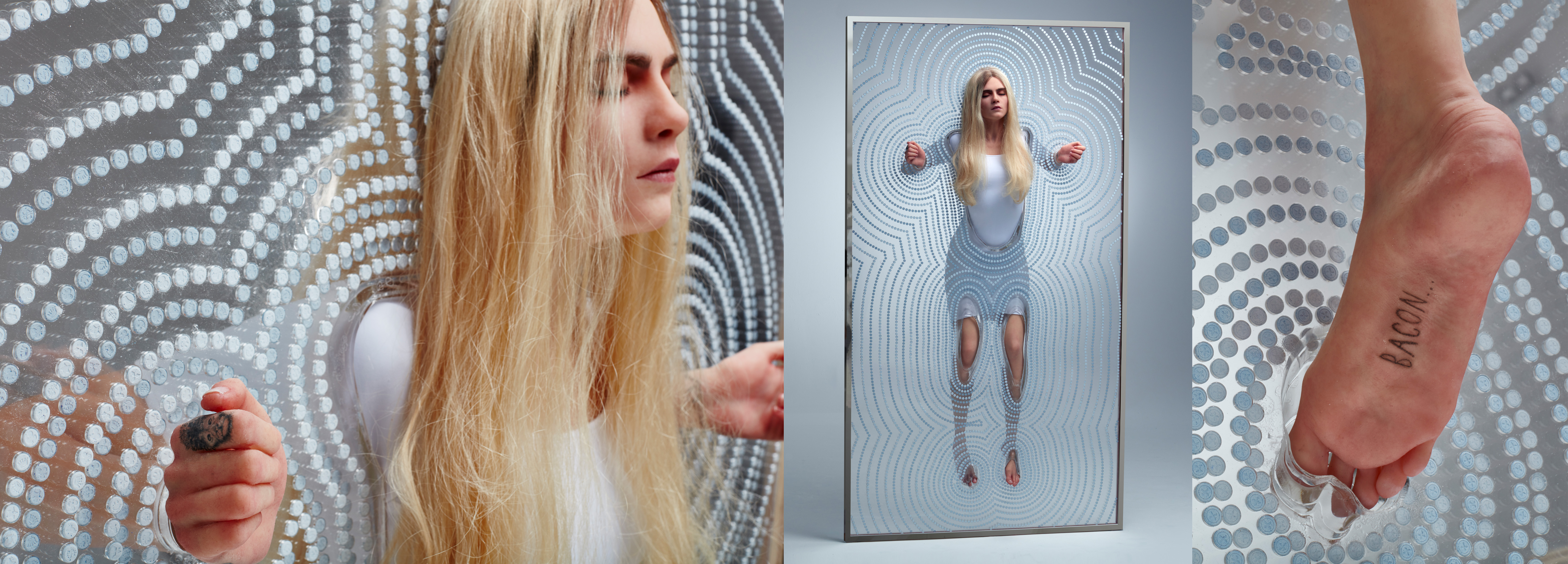
The Spirit of Ecstasy

The exhibition featured collaborations with Hayden Kays (Dollar, Euro, X, Yen) and Schoony (The Spirit of Ecstasy - featuring Cara Delevingne).

In June 2018, Chemical X donated a piece entitled Rush to the drug-testing charity The Loop to be auctioned to raise funds.

Later that year, Chemical X moved the Ecstasy Collection to Los Angeles, California.

Whilst in Los Angeles Chemical X encountered the houseless community in Skid Row. This led him to devise the installation 'Skid Rodeo Drive' as a response.

Juxtapoz magazine quoted Chemical X as saying, "I find Rodeo Drive pretty offensive, but Skid Row is just obscene. Not the community, but the fact that these places exist in the same town only a few miles apart. Luxury and poverty side by side is a very uncomfortable but powerful image."

Working with the Los Angeles Community Action Network, Chemical X and his team installed 12 four-person tents on San Julian in the Skid Row district on 30 May 2019. Each tent was covered in the livery of a luxury brand with a retail presence on Rodeo Drive in Beverly Hills. The houseless community helped install the work and occupied the tents whilst being filmed and photographed for their reactions and those of local residents. Once completed, the tents were donated to the Skid Row community.

Following the Skid Row installation, Chemical X exhibited the Ecstasy Collection in the Tower Records building on Sunset Strip in West Hollywood in a show entitled CXLA which took place on 9 and 10 November 2019.

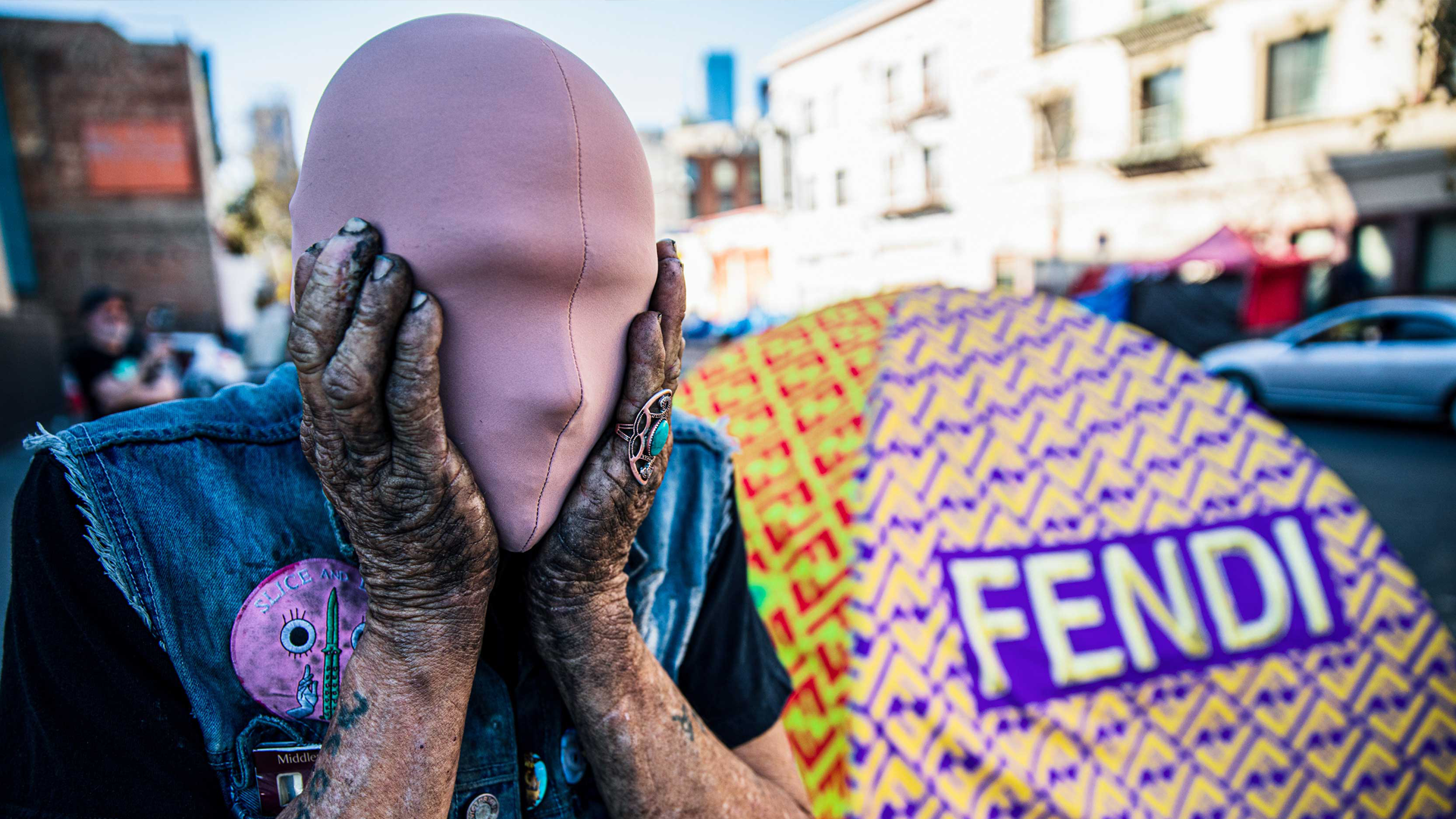
Skid Row resident, Pepper, takes part in Skid Rodeo Drive pt.2.

In February 2020, Chemical X returned to Skid Row to create the second part of the Skid Rodeo Drive installation. This installation featured a single tent pitched in a different location each day for a week, starting in Skid Row and moving across the city of Los Angeles completing the work on Rodeo Drive.

Each tent was accompanied by an individual occupant - a person who was genuinely experiencing houselessness - and who was anonymised via a flesh coloured mask that covered their head.

The work consisted of a series of videos entitled 'From The Row To Rodeo' interviewing passing members of the public about their interpretation of the work's meaning. The installation began on San Pedro in DTLA, and continued via City Hall, Echo Park, Route 101, The Frieze Art Fair, The Hollywood Walk of Fame, Fairfax and finally Rodeo Drive. Prior to the final installation, Beverly Hills Police informed the artist that pitching a tent on Rodeo Drive would result in his immediate arrest. Subsequently, Chemical X hired three flatbed trucks, pitched a tent on each of them and drove along Rodeo Drive but was not arrested. The event was reported by NBC and CBS.

Netflix commissioned Chemical X to create a piece of street art in Berlin to commemorate a new season of the show, How To Sell Drugs Online (Fast). In July 2020, Chemical X installed the 10 × 3 m artwork, which consisted of 130,000 fake ecstasy pills.

== NFTs ==
In early 2021, Chemical X co-founded ThisIsNumberOne.com. The 'Genesis Collection' was a series of five NFT artworks created in collaboration with Cara Delevingne, Fatboy Slim, Dave Stewart and Orbital, along with his own work entitled 'This Is Number One'. Cara Delevingne's 'Mine', a spoken word affirmation of female empowerment, drew global media coverage and was viewed over 1.8m times, and later sold for $20,000.
