= Miniscule of Sound =

Coordinates: 51°32′34.31″N 0°03′40.29″W

- Formation: 1998
- Type: Theatre group
- Purpose: Performance art
- Location: London, United Kingdom
- Website: http://www.minisculeofsound.com

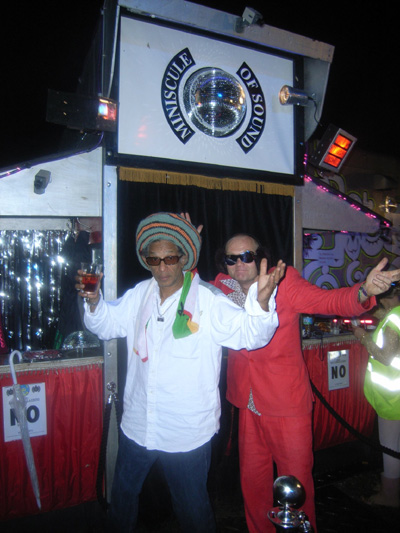
Don Letts at The Miniscule of Sound, in Fuji Rock Festival in Japan in 2011

The Miniscule of Sound is a performance given in a small wooden structure described as "The World's Smallest Niteclub". It was devised in Hackney, London, in 1998 as a parody of established superclubs, with the name referring to the Ministry of Sound. This led to representatives from the Ministry of Sound considering legal action, though in following communications an amicable agreement was reached. DJ magazines reported on this incident (e.g. Carl Loben's article for DJ Mag). It has been defined as a theatre performance piece by the British Council.

The 'niteclub' itself takes the form of a prefabricated wooden construction that is transported to venues, set up and operated as a small nightclub. The performers take the role of the staff, acting as the disc jockeys, bouncers, bar staff and cloakroom staff. In keeping with the parody of a real night club, the bouncers operate an idiosyncratic and opaque door policy, refusing entry to some visitors(for example refusing to let DJ Fat Boy Slim play until he'd sent in a demo tape). The construction occupies an area of 4 feet (1.2 metres) by 8 feet (2.4 m) with a dance floor of 2 square metres.

It had its first performance in August 1998 originally in the changing booth of a disused outdoor swimming pool, London Fields Lido in Hackney, and has since performed at a wide variety of events, predominantly at music festivals, including Glastonbury Festival (UK), Fuji Rock Festival (Japan), and the Big Day Out (Australia).

The Miniscule of Sound has been operated both in its own right (e.g. representing British culture in China for the British Council in 2005 ), and also participating as a sideshow at larger events. Originally it performed in local events in Hackney, east London, growing from the squat and rave party scene, with originators active in these subcultures and connected to similar artistic performance groups such as the Mutoid Waste Company.

In 2000 Guinness World Records named it the "Smallest mobile nightclub", a record it held until 2010, when the record passed to "Rumors".
