= Separation of powers =

Division of a state's government into branches

The separation of powers principle functionally differentiates several types of state power (usually legislation, adjudication, and execution) and requires these operations of government to be conceptually and institutionally distinct and clearly articulated, thereby maintaining the integrity of each branch. Separation of powers is closely linked to notions of checks and balances, which is a distinct but related term describing how the separate branches of government can interact in a way to limit one another.

Separation of judicial powers from the executive and legislative branches is the norm in modern democracies. However, many countries do not separate the legislative and executive branches; instead, they follow the principle of fusion of powers. This is the case particularly in parliamentary systems, especially the Westminster system, where parliament (the legislature) is supreme and sovereign. Separation of executive and legislative branches (mitigated by checks and balances) is the main principle in presidential systems and to some degree in semi-presidential governments.

== Meaning ==
A rigid interpretation of the separation of powers would mean none of the three branches may exercise the power of the other, nor should any person be a member of more than one branch. Separation of powers tempered by checks and balances means branches do have some powers that overlap with the other branches such as the presidential veto being a legislative power.

Separation of powers is contrasted with the fusion of powers associated with parliamentary systems. Shugart notes that an "informal fusion of powers" may arise in separation of powers system as well.

King and Bellamy argue that separation of powers is a broader term and can also exist in parliamentary system (in particular, when members of government may not be simultaneously members of the executive), but the meaning for the term can be complicated not only when there is personal overlap between branches. For example, in a presidential system a president may exercise veto rights, thereby taking part in the legislature or a house of the legislature may act as a court of impeachment proceedings. Such are generally understood the be checks and balances.

=== Checks and balances ===
In most modern constitutions, the separation of powers doctrine is modified by the notion of moderate, balanced government or checks and balances – a distinct idea that was developed from the ancient theory of mixed government. Since the two concepts developed alongside each other, they have been closely associated, even though they are in conflict to some extent. Further, constitutional provisions – notably those of the United States Constitution – may reflect compromises between the two principles, leading the terms "separation of powers" and "checks and balances" to become shorthand for the institutional distribution of legal authority under a specific constitution. They are at times even used interchangeably.

A government with checks and balances comprises more than one institution (often called a "branch" or "a power") exercising state power, and intends for each institution to have some influence over the other (interdependence). One institution may then "check" the other, or hinder it from using its power to pursue its ends – such as by declaring one of its actions a legal nullity or by questioning and removing one of its officers from their position. For instance, many legislatures consist of two houses; both of which are required to pass a bill before it becomes a law. A system of checks and balances also requires a balance of power between the institutions, so that the goals and actions of one are not completely determined by the other (independence); if both institutions were always in agreement by dint of one dominating the other, they would never challenge each other.

In a democratic state, where all government institutions are constituted by popular elections or through appointment by an elected body, disagreement between institutions may arise from conflicting institutional identities, fostered by differing internal power structures, decision-making processes or appointment procedures. To continue the example of a bicameral parliament, members of the upper house of the United States Congress are each elected by the entire people of one federal state; whereas each member of its lower house is elected by their electoral district, a smaller and more localized constituency. A member representing a larger and more diverse base may require a broader coalition, composed of people with opposing interests, to win election, and is thus incentivized to moderate their stance; and vice versa.

Checks and balances are designed to maintain the system of separation of powers keeping each branch in its place. The idea is that it is not enough to separate the powers and guarantee their independence but the branches need to have the constitutional means to defend their own legitimate powers from the encroachments of the other branches. Under this influence, it was implemented in 1787 in the Constitution of the United States separation of powers. In Federalist No. 78, Alexander Hamilton, citing Montesquieu, redefined the judiciary as a separately distinct branch of government with the legislative and the executive branches. Before Hamilton, many colonists in the American colonies had adhered to British political ideas and conceived of government as divided into executive and legislative branches (with judges operating as appendages of the executive branch).

James Madison wrote about checks and balances in Federalist No. 51. For Madison, no government would be necessary if men were angels, but since men must govern men, the challenge is to have a government control both the governed and itself. While the government is primarily controlled by its dependence on the public, other precautions are necessary. Having rival interests creates "the defect of better motives" in both private and public life, displayed in distributing power to make everybody's private interests defend public rights through checking each other.

== History ==
=== Antiquity ===
Polybius (Histories, Book 6, 11–13) described the Roman Republic as a mixed government ruled by the Roman Senate, Consuls and the Assemblies. Polybius explained the system of checks and balances in detail, crediting Lycurgus of Sparta with the first government of this kind.

=== Tripartite system ===
During the English Civil War, the parliamentarians viewed the English system of government as composed of three branches – the King, the House of Lords and the House of Commons – where the first should have executive powers only, and the latter two legislative powers. One of the first documents proposing a tripartite system of separation of powers was the Instrument of Government, written by the English general John Lambert in 1653, and soon adopted as the constitution of England for a few years during The Protectorate. The system comprised a legislative branch (the Parliament) and two executive branches, the English Council of State and the Lord Protector, all being elected (though the Lord Protector was elected for life) and having checks upon each other.

A further development in English thought was the idea that the judicial powers should be separated from the executive branch. This followed the use of the juridical system by the Crown to prosecute opposition leaders following the Restoration, in the late years of Charles II and during the short reign of James II (namely, during the 1680s).

=== John Locke's legislative, executive, and federative powers ===
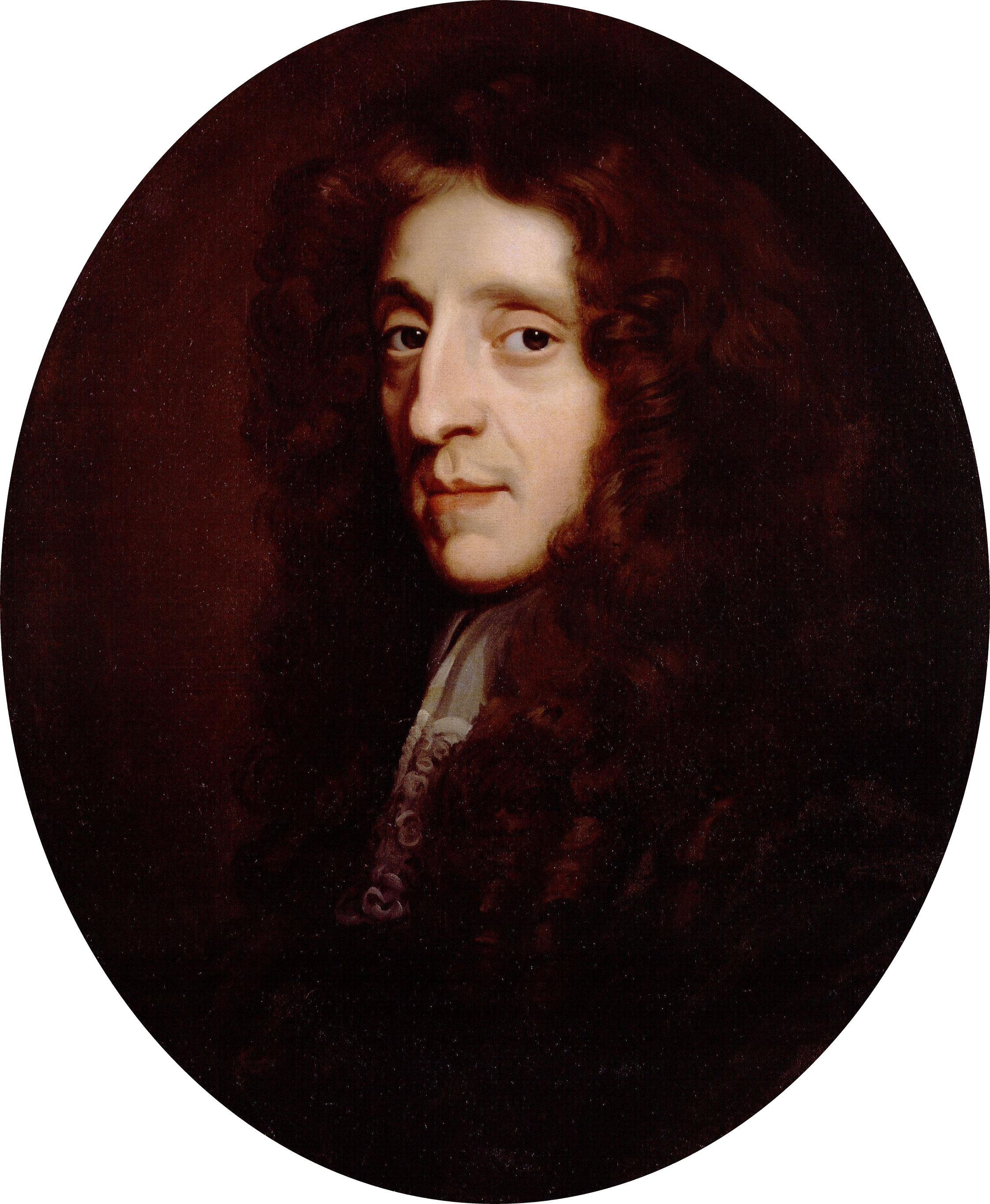
John Locke

An earlier forerunner to Montesquieu's tripartite system was articulated by John Locke in his work Two Treatises of Government (1690). In the Two Treatises, Locke distinguished between legislative, executive, and federative power. Locke defined legislative power as having "the right to direct how the force of the commonwealth shall be employed" (Second Treatise, § 143), while executive power entailed the "execution of the laws that are made, and remain in force" (Second Treatise, § 144). Locke further distinguished federative power, which entailed "the power of war and peace, leagues and alliances, and all transactions with all persons and communities without [outside] the commonwealth" (Second Treatise, § 145), or what is now known as foreign policy. Locke distinguishes between separate powers, but not between discretely separate institutions, and notes that one body or person can share in two or more of the powers.

Locke believed that the legislative power was supreme over the executive and federative powers, which are subordinate. Locke reasoned that the legislative was supreme because it has law-giving authority; "[F]or what can give laws to another, must need to be superior to him" (Second Treatise, § 150). According to Locke, legislative power derives its authority from the people, who have the right to make and unmake the legislature. He argues that once people consent to be governed by laws, only those representatives they have chosen can create laws on their behalf, and they are bound solely by laws enacted by these representatives.

Locke maintained that there are restrictions on the legislative power. Locke says that the legislature cannot govern arbitrarily, cannot levy taxes, or confiscate property without the consent of the governed (cf. "No taxation without representation"), and cannot transfer its law-making powers to another body, known as the nondelegation doctrine (Second Treatise, § 142).

=== Montesquieu's system ===
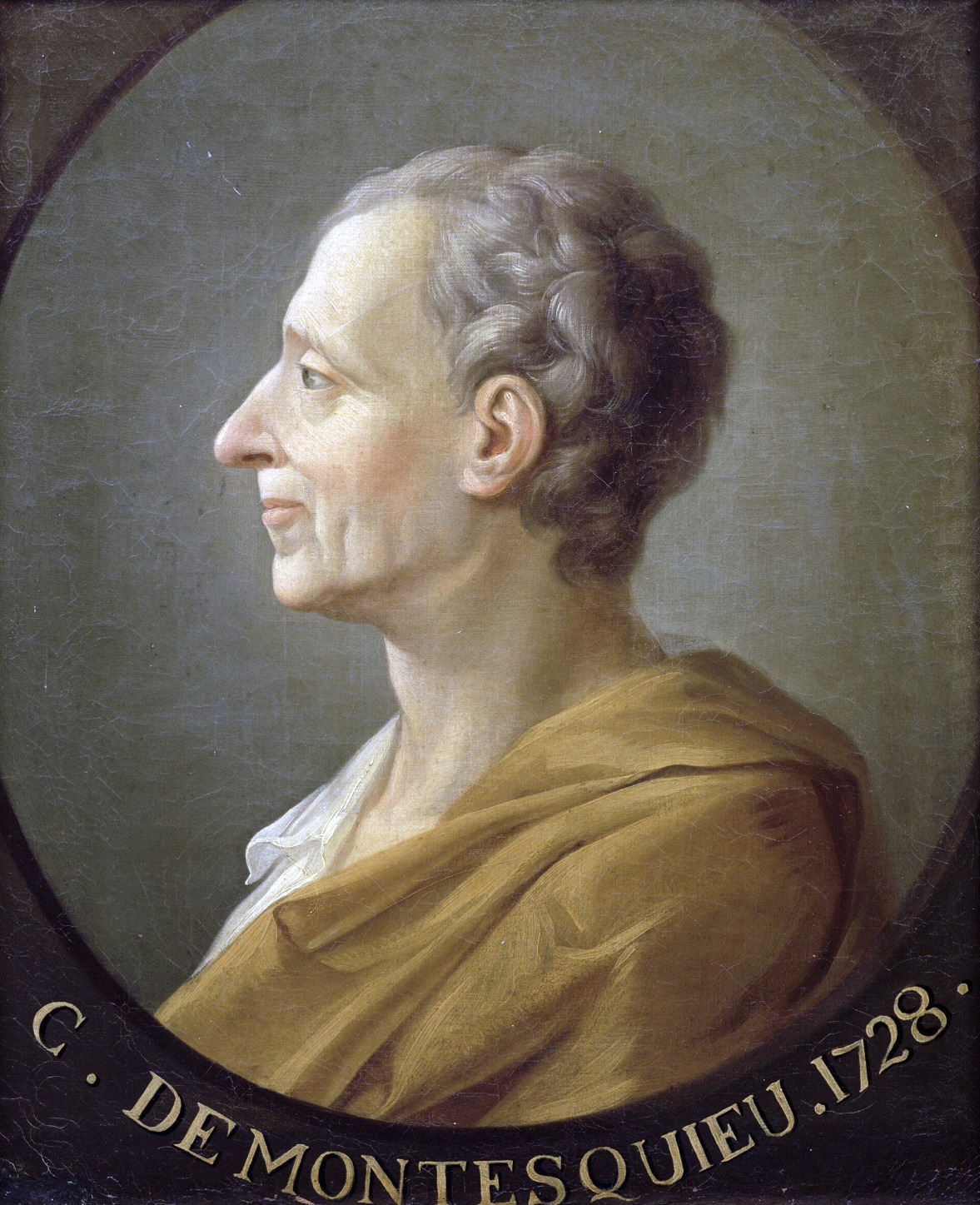
Montesquieu

The term "tripartite system" is commonly ascribed to French Enlightenment political philosopher Montesquieu, although he did not use such a term but referred to the "distribution" of powers. In The Spirit of Law (1748), Montesquieu described the various forms of distribution of political power among a legislature, an executive, and a judiciary. Montesquieu's approach was to present and defend a form of government whose powers were not excessively centralized in a single monarch or similar ruler (a form known then as "aristocracy"). He based this model on the Constitution of the Roman Republic and the British constitutional system. Montesquieu took the view that the Roman Republic had powers separated so that no one could usurp complete power. In the British constitutional system, Montesquieu discerned a separation of powers among the monarch, Parliament, and the courts of law.

In every government there are three sorts of power: the legislative; the executive in respect to things dependent on the law of nations; and the executive in regard to matters that depend on the civil law.

By virtue of the first, the prince or magistrate enacts temporary or perpetual laws and amends or abrogates those that have been already enacted. By the second, he makes peace or war, sends or receives embassies, establishes public security, and provides against invasions. By the third, he punishes criminals or determines the disputes that arise between individuals. The latter we shall call the judiciary power, and the other simply the executive power of the state.

Montesquieu argues that each Power should only exercise its own functions, or "there would be an end to everything". If the same person or body of magistrates held legislative and executive powers, liberty would be lost since the same monarch or senate could both enact and execute tyrannical laws. Similarly, a political entity holding both judiciary and legislative powers would exert arbitrary control over subjects, and one holding both judiciary and executive powers would be oppressive.

Separation of powers requires a different source of legitimization, or a different act of legitimization from the same source, for each of the separate powers. If the legislative branch appoints the executive and judicial powers, as Montesquieu indicated, there will be no separation or division of its powers, since the power to appoint carries with it the power to revoke. Executive power would be given to a monarch, as that branch's need to be quick is best fulfilled by one, while legislative power is better regulated by many. If executive power were given to selected members of the legislation rather than the monarch, liberty would be lost since the members would always be able to have both powers.

== Theories of division of state power ==
There are different theories about how to differentiate the functions of the state (or types of government power), so that they may be distributed among multiple structures of government (usually called branches of government, or arms). There are analytical theories that provide a conceptual lens through which to understand the separation of powers as realized in real-world governments (developed by the academic discipline of comparative government); there are also normative theories, both of political philosophy and constitutional law, meant to propose a reasoned (not conventional or arbitrary) way to separate powers. Disagreement arises between various normative theories in particular about what is the (desirable, in the case of political philosophy, or prescribed, in the case of legal studies) allocation of functions to specific governing bodies or branches of government. How to correctly or usefully delineate and define the 'state functions' is another major point of contention.

=== Branches of government ===
==== Legislation ====
The function of the legislative branch of government broadly consists of authoritatively issuing binding rules.

Legislation is regarded as one of the three main functions of government, which are often distinguished under the doctrine of the separation of powers. Those who have the formal power to create legislation are known as legislators; a judicial branch of government will have the formal power to interpret legislation (see statutory interpretation); the executive branch of government can act only within the powers and limits set by the law, which is the instrument by which the fundamental powers of government are established.

Some political systems follow the principle of legislative supremacy, which holds that the legislature is the supreme branch of government and cannot be bound by other institutions, such as the judicial branch or a written constitution. Such a system renders the legislature more powerful.

Legislatures will sometimes delegate their legislative power to administrative or executive agencies.

==== Execution ====
The executive is the part of the government that executes or enforces the law and policy of a government. The function of the executive branch of government includes many exercises of powers in fact, whether in carrying into effect legal decisions or affecting the real world on its own initiative. Separation of executive and legislative branches (mitigated by checks and balances) is the main principle in presidential systems and to some degree in semi-presidential governments.

The executive can also be the source of certain types of law or law-derived rules, such as a decree, executive order, or delegated legislation. For example, the U.S. federal legislative branch frequently delegates rulemaking (creation of regulations) to the U.S. federal executive branch.

==== Adjudication ====
The function of the judicial branch of government is the binding application of legal rules to a particular case, which usually involves creatively interpreting and developing these rules.

Separation of judicial powers from the executive and legislative branches is the norm in modern democracies.

Fusion of powers also used to be present between the judiciary and the legislature (with parliamentary supremacy), as the House of Lords acted as final court of appeal, until the establishment of the Supreme Court, which introduced a stricter separation of powers to the British system.

==== Constitutional court ====
A constitutional court may be separate from ordinary courts. It may exercise judicial review of acts of either the legislature, the executive or the judiciary and deem them unconstitutional where they conflict with constitutionally established rules, rights, and freedoms. Therefore it is often a powerful actor in the system of checks and balances. They may strike down, but not

Prior to 1919, the United States, Canada and Australia had adopted the concept of judicial review. In these countries, however, there is no separate constitutional court as a branch in itself, but it is fused with the ordinary judiciary.

The 1776 Constitution of Pennsylvania and 1777 Constitution of Vermont both establish a "Council of Censors" separate from the other branches of government, with the task of "recommending to the legislature the repealing of such laws as appear to them to have been enacted contrary to the principles of the constitution," an institution somewhat similar to a modern constitutional court. In 1919 the First Austrian Republic established the first dedicated constitutional court, the Constitutional Court of Austria. The organization and competences of both courts were influenced by constitutional theories of Hans Kelsen.

Today, separate constitutional courts as the ultimate arbiters of the constitution are common, but not universal in European parliamentary systems.

==== Auditory ====
The function of an auditory branch of government is to monitor the performance of the government in its operation. In Taiwan, the Control Yuan forms its own branch of government tasked with the oversight and auditing of the government, and holds the ability to impeach public officials for misconduct. In other nations these functions may be fused under the legislative branch, such as in the United States where the Government Accountability Office performs auditing while the House of Representatives and Senate oversee the process of impeachment.

Investigative or prosecutorial functions are often performed by officers with names like ombudsman, procurator, prosecutor, attorney general, or censor, with branch or department names like procuratorate and censorate. For example, in the United States, Georgia's attorney general is a constitutionally independent and directly elected officer.

=== Criticism of separation and 'checks and balances' ===
British constitutional expert Walter Bagehot criticised separation of powers, while praising the fusion of executive and legislative powers as the "efficient secret" of the Westminster system:

"The efficient secret of the English Constitution may be described as the close union, the nearly complete fusion, of the executive and legislative powers. No doubt by the traditional theory, as it exists in all the books, the goodness of our constitution consists in the entire separation of the legislative and executive authorities, but in truth its merit consists in their singular approximation."

Thomas Paine wrote about separation and check and balances in Common Sense. According to Paine, two houses on behalf of the king and the people respectively creates a house divided against itself. While "pleasantly arranged", this system will end up being dominated by the power made strongest in the constitution. Other powers can check its speed, but they will be ineffectual if they cannot stop it. Importantly, Paine rejected the theory that English liberty was secured by constitutionally guaranteed checks and balances. He denounced the whole notion of checks and balances, at least as far as the English constitution was concerned, in that "it is wholly owing to the constitution of the people and not to the constitution of the government that the crown is not as oppressive in England as in Turkey."

Marx believed what he perceived as the modern constitutions of the dictatorship of the bourgeoisie invested too much power in the executive at the expense of the legislature. For example, he criticised the French Constitution of 1848 for replacing the hereditary monarchy with an elected monarch in the form of the president of the republic. That is, Marx believed the separation of powers increased the president's power at the expense of the popularly elected legislature, concluding that the 1848 constitution had created a system with "two heads [...] the Legislative Assembly, on the one hand, the President, on the other."

Thomas Hobbes also strongly opposed separation of powers.

Sartori argued against separation of powers: "Dispersal of power among executive and legislature easily becomes a messy and wasteful confusion of power".

Checks and balances, such as veto rights in a separation of powers systems can result in gridlock when veto players in each of the branches are not aligned.

== Examples ==
=== United States ===
The American form of separation of powers is associated with a system of checks and balances. Montesquieu's philosophy heavily influenced the Founding Fathers of the United States and thereby the United States Constitution, according to which the legislative, executive, and judicial branches of the United States government are kept distinct to prevent abuse of power.

Alexander Hamilton and James Madison, who participated in the Constitutional Convention of 1787, which drafted the Constitution argued for separation of powers in the Federalist.

Some U.S. states did not observe a strict separation of powers in the 18th century. In New Jersey, the governor also functioned as a member of the state's highest court and as the presiding officer of one house of the New Jersey Legislature. The president of Delaware was a member of the Court of Appeals; the presiding officers of the two houses of the state legislature also served in the executive department as vice presidents. In both Delaware and Pennsylvania, members of the executive council served at the same time as judges. On the other hand, many southern states explicitly required the separation of powers. Maryland, Virginia, North Carolina and Georgia all kept the branches of government "separate and distinct."

== Hybrids of separation and fusion of powers ==
Some forms of government combine separation and fusion of legislative executive powers in different ways.

In an assembly-independent republic, the executive is elected by the legislature (fusion) but, once in office, is not politically accountable to it and cannot be removed through a vote of no confidence (separation). In comparative politics, this institutional arrangement is commonly described as assembly-independent government, referring to systems that combine legislative election of the executive with its independence from parliamentary dismissal. They may or may not also hold a seat in the legislature.

In a semi-presidential republic a president exists alongside a prime minister and a cabinet, with the latter two being responsible to the legislature (fusion). It differs from a parliamentary system in that it has an executive president independent from the legislature (separation); and from the presidential system in that the cabinet, although named by the president, is responsible to the legislature, which may force the cabinet to resign through a motion of no confidence.

A semi-parliamentary system is a system of government in which the legislature is split into two parts that are both directly elected – the first chamber has the power to select and remove the members of the executive by a vote of no confidence (fusion), while the second chamber does not (separation).

Under dualistic parliamentary forms of government, where the membership of the legislative and executive powers cannot overlap, however, as part of the parliamentary structure, fusion is still the dominant relation between the two branches. Examples include Sweden and the Netherlands.

=== Australia ===
The Australian system can be described as semi-parliamentary in that only the House of Representatives has confidence powers (fusion), while the Senate represents an aspect of separation of powers. The system has also been named a "Washminster" variation for this reason.

=== France ===
The current French Fifth Republic provides an example of the fusion of powers from a country that does not follow the Westminster system. Rather France follows a model known alternatively as a semi-presidential system or 'mixed presidential-parliamentary' system, which is a variation on parliamentary democracy and with a significant role played by the president in the executive branch.

=== Japan ===
Under the Constitution of Japan, a majority of cabinet ministers, including the prime minister, must be members of the National Diet. The system can be described as semi-parliamentary in that only the House of Representatives has confidence powers (fusion), while the House of Councillors represents an aspect of separation of powers.

== See also ==
- Consociationalism
- Constitutionalism – Belief that government authority derives from fundamental law
- Parliamentary sovereignty – Constitutional legal doctrine
- Philosophy of law – Theoretical study of law
- Pith and substance – Canadian legal principle
- Reserve power – Discretional power of a head of state
- Separation of duties

== Notes ==
=== Works cited ===
- Barber, Nicholas W. (March 2001). "Prelude to the Separation of Powers". The Cambridge Law Journal. 60 (1): 59–88. doi:10.1017/S0008197301000629. JSTOR 4508751.
- Gwyn, William B. (1965). The Meaning of the Separation of Powers. An Analysis of the Doctrine from its Origin to the Adoption of the United States Constitution. Tulane Studies in Political Science. Vol. IX. New Orleans/The Hague: Tulane University Press/Martinus Nijhoff. OCLC 174573519.
- Kurland, Philip B. (December 1986). "The Rise and Fall of the 'Doctrine' of Separation of Powers". Michigan Law Review. 85 (3): 592–613. doi:10.2307/1288758. JSTOR 1288758.
- Magill, M. Elizabeth (2000). "The Real Separation in Separation of Powers Law". Virginia Law Review. 86 (6): 1127–1198. doi:10.2307/1073943. JSTOR 1073943. SSRN 224797. Archived from the original on 29 September 2022.
- Möllers, Christoph [in German] (2013). The Three Branches: A Comparative Model of Separation of Powers. Oxford University Press. ISBN 9780198738084. OCLC 818450015.
- Möllers, Christoph (September 2019). "Separation of Powers (ch. 9)". In Masterman, Roger; Schütze, Robert (eds.). The Cambridge Companion to Comparative Constitutional Law. Cambridge Companions to Law. Cambridge University Press. pp. 230‒257. doi:10.1017/9781316716731. ISBN 978-1-107-16781-0. OCLC 1099539425.
- Sandro, Paolo (2022). The Making of Constitutional Democracy: From Creation to Application of Law. Law and Practical Reason. Vol. 13. Oxford: Bloomsbury (Hart imprint). doi:10.5040/9781509905249. ISBN 978-1-50990-524-9. OCLC 1274231156. OAPEN 20.500.12657/74777.
- Vile, Maurice J. C. (1967). Constitutionalism and the Separation of Powers. Oxford: Clarendon Press. OCLC 390050.
- Waldron, Jeremy (28 March 2013). "Separation of Powers in Thought and Practice?". Boston College Law Review. 54 (2): 433–468.
