= Hackney Downs School =

School in England

Location
- Downs Park Road; Lower Clapton, Greater London, E5 8NP; England; 51°33′06″N 0°03′43″W

Information
- Type: Community school
- Established: 1876
- Founder: Worshipful Company of Grocers
- Closed: 1995
- Local authority: Hackney London Borough Council
- Department for Education URN: 100276 Tables
- Gender: Boys
- Age range: 11–16

Hackney Downs School was an 11–16 boys, community comprehensive secondary school in Lower Clapton, Greater London, England. It was established in 1876 and closed in 1995. It has been replaced by the Mossbourne Community Academy.

== History ==
=== Grocers' Company's School ===
It was founded in 1876 as The Grocers' Company's School. On its transfer to the London County Council in 1906 the school was renamed Hackney Downs School.

=== Second World War ===
The school was evacuated to King's Lynn on Friday 13 October 1939. Only half of those eligible to be evacuated moved to King's Lynn. Sir Michael Caine joined the school in 1944 in King's Lynn, and had been evacuated to North Runcton in 1939. Maurice Vile, Barry Supple and painter Leon Kossoff were evacuated with the school. 370 boys and teachers were in the Norfolk villages of Outwell and Upwell from 2 September 1939, where they worked in the orchards. Nutritionist John Yudkin, who went to the school in the 1920s, gave a lecture in King's Lynn on 'Health in Wartime' on Friday 12 September 1941.

Harold Pinter was evacuated in 1944, with a schoolmaster, which he wrote about in his play A Slight Ache. The school stayed until July 1945, almost six years.

=== Grammar school ===
The school was noted for educating Jewish Londoners, with alumni including Nobel prize-winning playwright Harold Pinter, fellow playwright and actor Steven Berkoff, 1960s tycoon John Bloom and nutritionist John Yudkin. Two current members of the House of Lords are former pupils: (Lord Levy and Lord Clinton-Davis). The school had 600 boys with a sixth-form entry by the early 1970s. Former high jumper and Board Director of London 2012 Olympics Bid Team Dalton Grant attended Hackney Downs School in the 1980s.

=== Comprehensive ===
In 1969 it became a comprehensive school. By the time of its closure, over 70 per cent of the boys spoke English as a second language, half came from households with no-one in employment, and half the intake had reading ages three years below average.

=== Decline and closure ===
Things came to a head in the 1990s, when the school made national news by being described by the then Conservative government as the 'worst school in Britain'. Eventually, as a result of direct government pressure, the school was forced to close in 1995.

=== Later use of the building ===
The site of the old school is now occupied by Mossbourne Community Academy, founded by Sir Clive Bourne, which opened in 2004. The school buildings of both the original Grocers' Company's School and Hackney Downs School have gone.

== Old boys ==
The Old Boys of Hackney Downs continue their interactions as alumni through the Clove Club, which meets regularly, has its own website, and sponsors an email group called The Clove eGroup (on Yahoo), and featured on The Clove Club website.

=== History of the school ===
An official history of the school was published by the Clove Club in 1972. An updated edition was published in 2012: Hackney Downs 1876-1995: The Life and Death of a School.

=== Headmasters ===
- Thomas O. Balk - 1935 to 1952
- John Kemp - 1974 to 1989

== Notable alumni ==
=== Hackney Downs School (1974–95) ===
- Dalton Grant, high jumper
- Geoffrey Hanks, professor of palliative care medicine
- Metin Hüseyin, film and television director

=== Boys' grammar school (1906–74) ===
- Lazarus Aaronson, poet
- Geoffrey Alderman, historian, political adviser and journalist
- Arnold Allen CBE, chief executive 1982–84 of the United Kingdom Atomic Energy Authority
- Sir Edward Bairstow, organist of York Minster 1913–46, composer (attended 1889–91)
- Alexander Baron, writer
- Morris Beckman, writer and anti-fascist activist
- Steven Berkoff, actor, playwright, director
- Gerald Bernbaum, Vice-Chancellor 1993–2001 of London South Bank University, and Professor of Education 1974–93 at the University of Leicester
- Mike Berry, singer and actor
- John Bloom, 1960s tycoon
- Eric Bristow, world champion darts player
- Air Vice-Marshal Reggie Bullen CB GM
- Sir Stanley Burnton, Lord Justice of Appeal and Fellow of St Edmund Hall, Oxford
- Sir Michael Caine (Maurice Joseph Micklewhite, Jr.), CBE, actor (attended 1944–45, evacuated to King's Lynn during World War II)
- Roland Camberton, writer
- Frank Cass, publisher
- Stanley Clinton Davis, Baron Clinton-Davis, Labour MP 1970–83 for Hackney Central
- Paul Dean CB, Director National Physical Laboratory 1977-90
- Prof David Dolphin, OC, FRS, chemist, inventor of Visudyne, winner of Canada's Hertzberg Medal Home
- Prof Cyril Domb, physicist, Professor of Theoretical Physics 1954–81 at King's College London
- Maurice Evans, actor, noted for his interpretations of Shakespearean characters
- Basil Feldman, Baron Feldman, businessman and Conservative party peer
- Frederic Sutherland Ferguson, bibliographer
- Abram Games OBE, graphic designer
- Arthur Gold CBE, chairman 1988–92 of the British Olympic Association
- Michael Goldstein CBE, Vice-Chancellor of Coventry University 1992–2004, Director of Coventry Polytechnic 1987–92
- Arnold Goodman, Baron Goodman, Master 1976–86 of University College, Oxford
- Douglas Gough, Professor of Theoretical Astrophysics since 1993 at the University of Cambridge, and Director 1999–2004 of the Institute of Astronomy, Cambridge
- Efraim Halevy, former head of Mossad
- William Harold Hutt, economist, and Professor of Commerce and Dean of the Faculty of Commerce 1931–64 at the University of Cape Town
- Frank Cyril James, Principal and Vice-Chancellor 1939–62 of McGill University, Canada
- Brigadier Sam Janikoun OBE.
- Stanley Joslin, Chief Inspector of Nuclear Installations 1959–64 at the Ministry of Power
- Leon Kossoff, painter
- Stephen Latner, Managing Director 1998–99 of Warburg Dillon Read
- Michael Levy, Baron Levy
- John Lewis, Labour MP 1945–50 for Bolton and 1950–51 for Bolton West
- Ben Lockspeiser, first President of CERN
- Dennis Lyons CB, director 1965–71 of the Road Research Laboratory
- Leonard Millis CBE, director 1939–74 of the British Waterworks Association
- Stephen M. Milner Professor of Plastic and Reconstructive Surgery, Johns Hopkins University School of Medicine, Baltimore, Maryland 1961-1968
- Cyril Offord, Professor of Mathematics 1966–73 at the London School of Economics (LSE)
- Stanley Orman, Director of Missiles 1978–81 at the AWRE, and Chief Weapon System Engineer of Polaris 1981–82
- Fuller Osborn, Chief Executive 1965–78 of Northern Rock Building Society
- Jerry Pam, Hollywood agent and member of the Finance Committee of the Academy of Motion Picture Arts and Sciences; publicist of Sir Michael Caine
- Keith Pavitt, of the Science and Technology Policy Research
- Maurice Peston, Baron Peston of Mile End, English economist, Professor of Economics 1965–88 at Queen Mary College, and father of Robert Peston
- Harold Pinter, playwright, screenwriter, director and actor
- Prof Derek S. Pugh, British psychologist, business theorist and Emeritus Professor of International Management at the Open University Business School (attended 1944–48, evacuated to Northampton during World War II)
- Henry Richardson, film editor
- Lt Col F. J. Roberts, editor of The Wipers Times
- Philip Robinson, executive director, Financial Services Authority 1998–2009
- Norman Rose, biographer of Sir Winston Churchill
- Ralph Shackman, professor of urology 1961–75 at Hammersmith Hospital
- Alfred Sherman, journalist
- Barrie Sherman, trade unionist
- Colin Shindler, first professor of Israeli Studies in the UK, SOAS
- Aubrey Silberston CBE, professor of economics 1978–87 at Imperial College London, and father of Jeremy Silberston
- Barry Supple CBE, professor of economic history 1981–93 University of Cambridge, and a former director of the Leverhulme Trust, and father of Tim Supple (attended 1942–49)
- Maurice Vile, Professor Emeritus and former Deputy Vice-Chancellor, the University of Kent
- William Warbey, Labour MP 1945–50 for Luton, and 1953–55 for Broxtowe, and 1955–66 for Ashfield
- Maurice Wohl CBE, businessman
- Henry Woolf, theatre director
- John Yudkin, Professor of Nutrition 1954–71 at Queen Elizabeth College, known for finding links between sugar and coronary heart disease

=== Grocers' Company's School (1876–1906) ===
- Cecil J. Allen, author, musician, lecturer, who wrote more than 700 articles about locomotives and over 40 books on railways of Europe, attended the Grocer's Company's School circa 1898
- F. Britten Austin, playwright whose book The Drum would be made into The Last Outpost
- Sir Robert Barlow, businessman, former Chairman of the Metal Box Company
- Prof Raymond Wilson Chambers, Quain Professor of English Language and Literature 1922–41 at University College London
- Cecil Vandepeer Clarke (1888–1961) engineer, inventor and soldier
- Prof Millais Culpin, Professor 1931–39 of Medical-Industrial Psychology at London School of Hygiene & Tropical Medicine

== Collections ==
The Institute of Education, University College London holds an archive of background material about Hackney Downs school that was collected together for the book Hackney Downs: the school that dared to fight by Maureen O'Connor, Sally Tomlinson, Elizabeth Hales and Jeff Davies (Cassell, 1999).

== Sources ==
- O'Connor, Maureen, et al. Hackney Downs: The School That Dared to Fight. London: Cassell, 1999. ISBN 0-304-70710-4 (10). ISBN 978-0-304-70710-2 (13). Print.
- Watkins, G. L., ed. The Clove's Lines: The Newsletter of the Clove Club: The Old Boys of Hackney Downs School. Print. (Some issues are accessible online at the website of the Clove Club.)
- Watkins, G. L., ed. 'Fortune's Fool': A Life of Joe Brearley: The Man Who Taught Harold Pinter. Aylesbury, Buckinghamshire, Eng.: TwigBooks, 2008. Print.
