= Mossbourne Victoria Park Academy =

School in Hackney, London

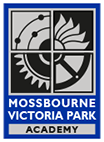

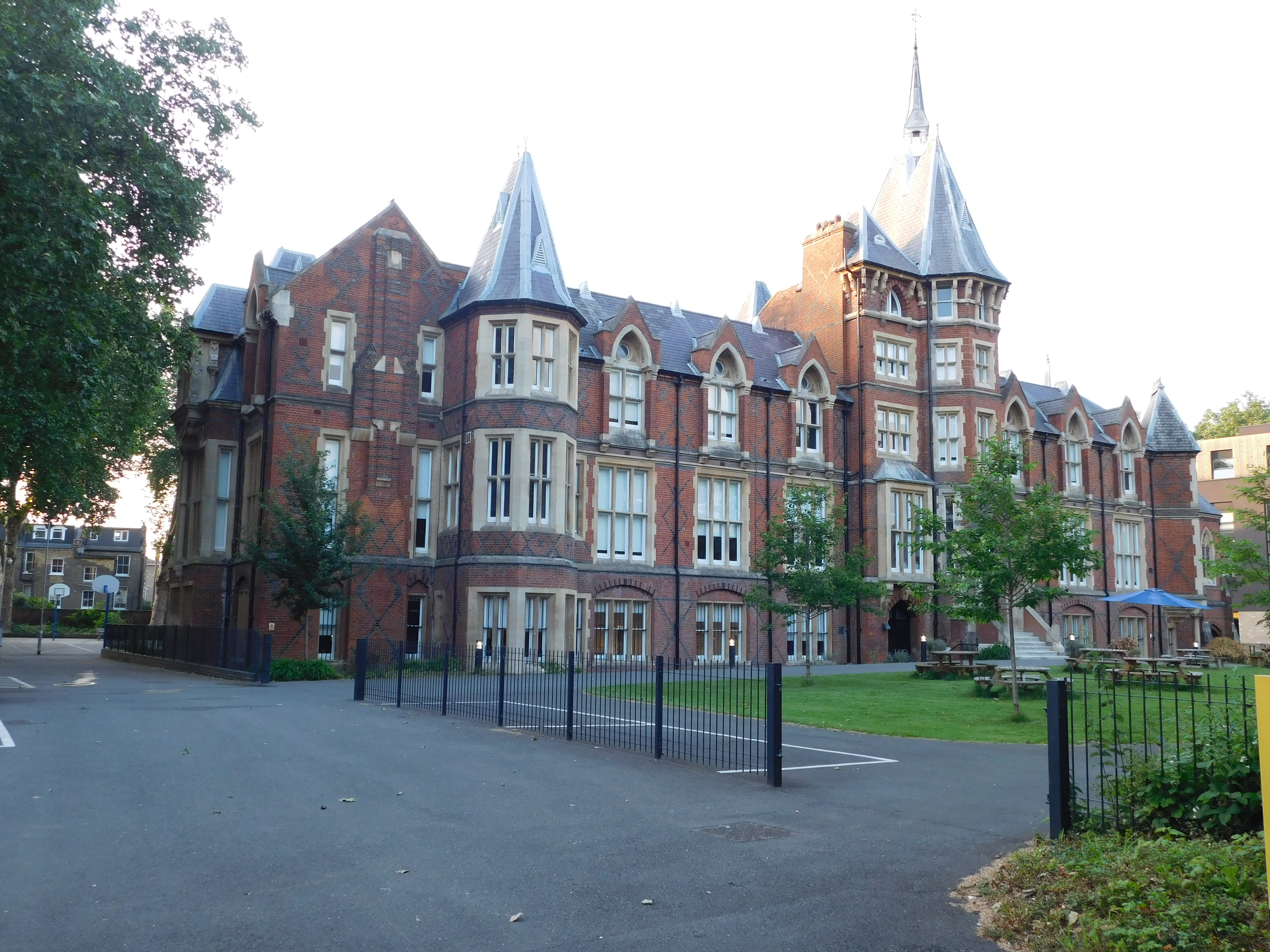

Location
- South Hackney, London, E97HD; England; 51°32′21″N 0°02′33″W

Information
- Type: Academy
- Motto: "Fulfilling your true potential..."
- Established: 2014
- Founder: Sir Clive Bourne
- Sister school: Mossbourne Community Academy
- Department for Education URN: 140210 Tables
- Ofsted: Reports
- CEO: Peter Hughes
- Principal: Matthew Toothe
- Gender: Coeducational
- Age: 11 to 16
- Houses: Ali, Angelou, Curie, Hawking, King, Pankhurst
- Colours: Grey, Blue
- Website: www.mvpa.mossbourne.org

Mossbourne Victoria Park Academy, or MVPA, is a coeducational secondary school located in the Victoria Park area of London, England, facing Well Street Common.

== Description ==
It is the second school to be named under Mossbourne Academy. The school was created in 2014: the building formerly used by Cardinal Pole Roman Catholic School was first built to drawings by Robert Lewis Roumieu for the French Hospital (La Providence), which opened there in 1865. In the summer of 2019 the first cohort's GCSE results placed the academy in the top 65 schools in England for student progress. The headteacher is Matthew Toothe.

As of 2024, the school's most recent inspection by Ofsted was in 2023, with a judgement of Outstanding.

== Buildings ==
The school has two buildings: the Huguenot building and the Carroll building which is new and was officially opened in January 2015.

== Behaviour policy ==
In November 2024, The Observer reported that parents and teachers have spoken out about the school's behavioural policies, saying that children's mental health has been damaged by "teachers humiliating and "screaming" at pupils". Parents said that there had been five cases of children "with no prior incontinence issues soiling themselves, or menstruating through their uniforms, because they were not allowed to go to the toilet or were too scared to ask". They described children who had become anxious or depressed as a result of their school experiences, and asked that Hackney local authority carry out a safeguarding review.

Leaders at the school said that "We were saddened to read these accounts as we do not recognise the characterisation of the school". Since the original article The Observer received further allegations about schools run by the Mossbourne Federation, totaling from almost 140 parents, students and teachers. In December 2024, the Department for Education said "These allegations are deeply distressing. ... We are working urgently with the local authority and the Mossbourne Federation to establish the facts and any necessary action". Hackney's independent child safeguarding commissioner convened a multi-agency meeting which decided to undertake a child safeguarding practice review led by Alan Wood, former director of children's services in Hackney.

In December 2024 The Observer published a letter signed by 314 current and former parents which presented another side to the argument, defending the school's positive impact on the students under its care.

== Alumni ==
- Sonny Perkins, a professional football player who has played for West Ham United F.C. and Leeds United F.C., studied at Mossbourne.
