= French Hospital (La Providence) =

Almshouses for descendants of Huguenots in Rochester, Kent, England

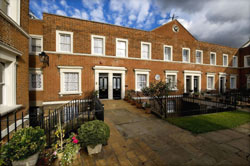
- French Hospital (La Providence), Rochester, Kent. Main elevation Photograph by Tim Rawle
- Interactive map of French Hospital (La Providence)
- 51.3884°N 0.5051°E
- Location: 41 La Providence, Rochester, Kent, United Kingdom

History
- Founded: 1718

Listed Building – Grade II
- Designated: 19 February 1970
- Reference no.: 1116336

The French Hospital was founded in 1718 in Finsbury on behalf of poor French Protestants and their descendants residing in Great Britain. In the 1860s it moved into the spectacular purpose-built hospital designed by Robert Lewis Roumieu in Victoria Park, Hackney, and then in the 1940s moved out of London to Compton's Lea, Horsham, West Sussex. Since 1959 it has been located in Rochester, Kent and today provides almshouse accommodation for Huguenot descendants.

== Early years ==
Affectionately known as La Providence from as early as the 1720s, the hospital for poor French Protestants and their descendants was one of the earliest foundations to improve the welfare of London’s needy immigrants, and one of the first in Britain to provide sympathetic care for the mentally ill.

=== Golden Acre, Finsbury ===
The French Hospital in England by Tessa Murdoch and Randolph Vigne The French Hospital, near Old Street, Finsbury (oil on canvas, artist unknown, c. 1860)

In his will proved on 2 December 1708, Jacques de Gastigny, who had been Master of the Hounds to King William III, left £1,000 to improve the pest-house to the north of Old Street in the parish of St Giles without Cripplegate and provide an annual revenue which "shall be employed to ffurnish Bedds, Linnen and Cloths and other necessities of the said poor ffrench Protestants who shall be in the said place". This set in train the establishment of the French Hospital that was to be a forerunner of health and welfare institutions set up in England in the eighteenth century.

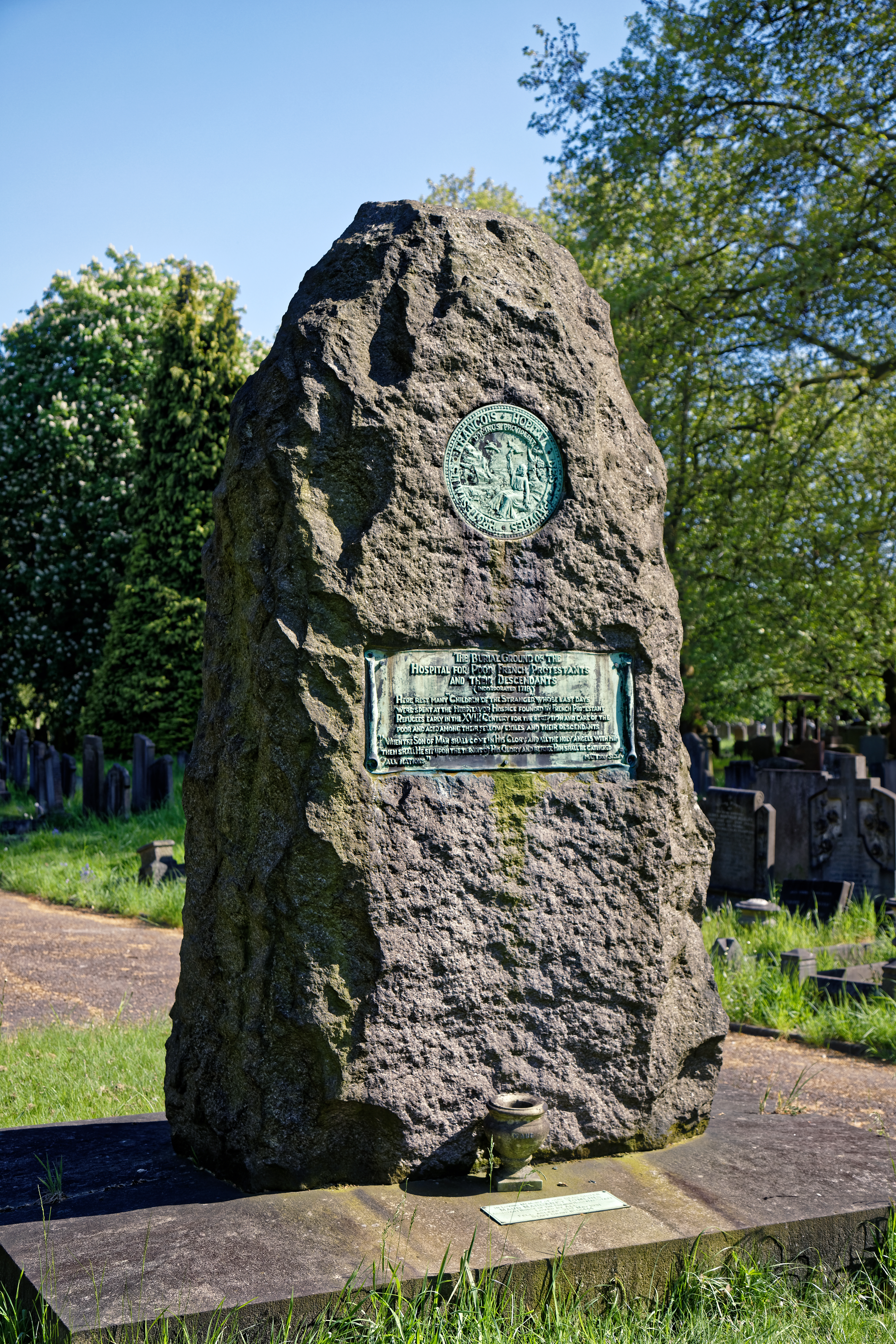
Burial monument to the dead of the French Hospital at the City of London Cemetery

Philippe Ménard, executor of Jacques de Gastigny's estate, served as secretary for an appeal to supplement the bequest. The appeal was so successful that the idea grew not merely to build an extension to the Cripplegate pest-house but to build a new hospital building. The French Hospital was incorporated under the Great Seal by letters patent dated 24 July 1718. The corporation chose as its own seal an image of Elijah being fed by the ravens (1 Kings 17:6), with the motto Dominus providebit ("The Lord will provide"). An inventory of the contents of the hospital from 1742 survives.

By the early nineteenth century, the number of inmates of the hospital had fallen and the buildings in Finsbury were in urgent need of restoration. Rather than rebuilding the hospital on its Bath Street site, it was decided to find a new London location.

=== Victoria Park, Hackney ===
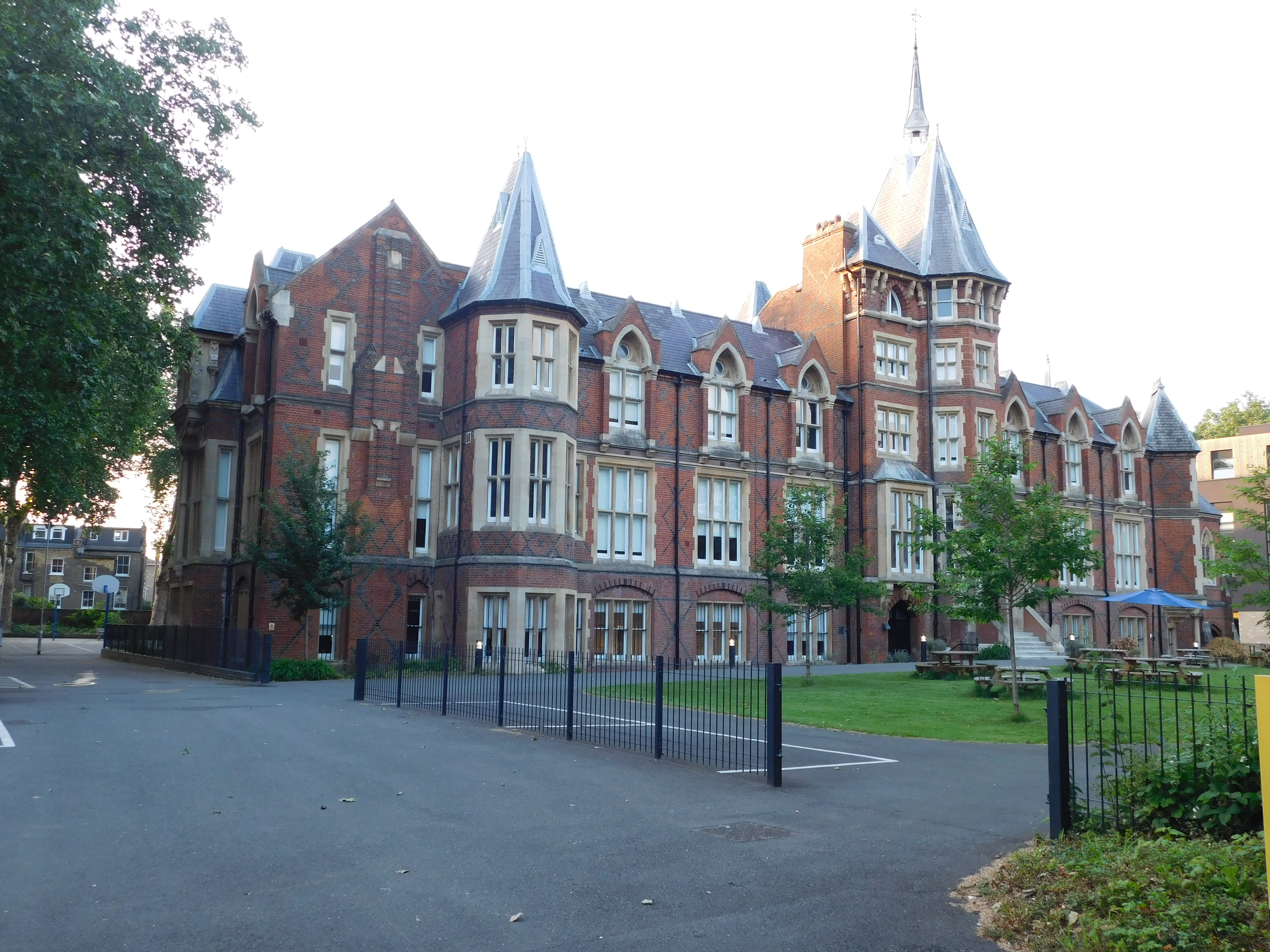
Mossbourne Victoria Park Academy, the former French Protestant Hospital in Victoria Park

When the new hospital in Hackney opened in 1865 the Builder claimed it had been modelled on the Château de Chambord. The architect, Robert Lewis Roumieu, who had generously waived his fee for his drawings, was for a while the hospital's treasurer. Besides being a hospital for its sixty inmates, with state-of-the-art equipment, it also consolidated a revival of interest in Huguenot history and achievement and became a repository for Huguenot records and items with a Huguenot tradition.

In 1941 the inmates were evacuated and the French Hospital building was requisitioned as a day nursery for mothers doing war work, although the Court Room and Library were retained. With the growth and consolidation of state health and welfare after the war, the directors decided that the hospital's future lay as an almshouse in a new location. Roumieu's building was sold and became St Victoire School for Girls. In the 1970s the building was part of Cardinal Pole Catholic School. Since 2014 the building has been home to the Mossbourne Victoria Park Academy.

=== Compton's Lea, Horsham ===
A fine Victorian house standing in its own ten acres was bought in 1947. But occupancy was too low and the hospital was running at a loss, although the situation was redeemed by revenue from other property owned by the hospital. The idea of "conversion into almshouses of a square of small houses off Rochester High Street" tentatively suggested a few years earlier now found favour at the directors' court of April 1956 and the project "to use Theobald Square as homes for old people" was to proceed.

== French Hospital today ==
=== La Providence, Rochester ===
In September 1959 the first nineteen flats on Theobald Square now officially renamed La Providence in the cathedral city of Rochester were filled. The buildings are mid 19th century, substantially renovated in 1957-9; they are Grade II listed. The doctor's house at 105 High Street was renumbered 41 La Providence. Today the French Hospital's main duty is still to provide care "for those among us who are in distress".

Over the years many distinguished Huguenot settlers or their descendants have been associated with the hospital, from the soldiers Henri de Massue de Ruvigny, Earl of Galway and John Ligonier, 1st Earl Ligonier (both of whom served as governors of the hospital), to the diplomatist John Robethon and the surgeon Paul Buissière (both also governors), to the lawyer Sir Samuel Romilly and the archaeologist Sir Austen Henry Layard. The ivory carver David Le Marchand died there in 1726.

Successive Earls of Radnor were governors of the hospital from the eighteenth century to 2015.

=== Huguenot Museum ===
A new Huguenot Museum, which displays the collections of the French Hospital, was opened on 13 May 2015 in Rochester, Kent, with support from the Heritage Lottery Fund and individual donations.
