= Ben Lockspeiser =

British scientist (1891–1990)

Sir Ben Lockspeiser KCB FRS
- Lockspeiser in 1958
- Born: Ben Lockspeiser; 9 March 1891; City of London
- Died: 18 October 1990 (aged 99); Farnborough
- Education: Grocers' School, Hackney
- Alma mater: Sidney Sussex College, Cambridge
- Known for: Secretary of DSIR; First President of CERN
- Spouse(s): Elsie Shuttleworth (1920-1964); Mary Alice Heywood (1966-1983)
- Children: Judith, Frida and David
- Awards: See list
- Scientific career
- Institutions: RAE; Air Ministry; DSIR

Sir Ben Lockspeiser, KCB, FRS, MIMechE, FRAeS (9 March 1891 – 18 October 1990) was a British scientific administrator and the first President of CERN.

== Early life and education ==
Lockspeiser was born at 7 President Street in the City of London, the eldest son of Leon Lockspeiser, diamond merchant, and Rosa (née Gleitzman), immigrants from Poland. He spent most of his early years in Clapton, east London, and was educated at the Grocers' School, Hackney. At age fifteen he was awarded a prize as “the best junior boy in all England” in the University of Cambridge Junior Local Examination. Two years later he won an open scholarship to Sidney Sussex College, Cambridge, where he gained a first in part one of the natural sciences tripos, and a second in the mechanical sciences tripos.

== Career ==
When the First World War began Lockspeiser immediately enlisted with the Royal Army Medical Corps (RAMC), and sailed for Gallipoli as a private in 1915. He was soon invalided out with amoebic dysentery Amoebiasis to Egypt. He stayed on and worked for a time on a treatment for the disease. He was demobilized in 1919 and, back in England, gained entry to the armaments and aerodynamics section of the Royal Aircraft Establishment (RAE) at Farnborough. His work mainly involved the chemical de-icing of aircraft, and metal fatigue. In 1936 he was made head of the RAE's air defence department, succeeding Harold Roxbee Cox.

In 1939 Lockspeiser moved to the Air Ministry as assistant director of scientific research, and then to the new Ministry of Aircraft Production in 1940, to become deputy director (armaments) in 1941. In 1943 he became the ministry's director of scientific research, and in 1945 director-general. He is credited with suggesting the spotlights height system used by 617 Squadron, RAF during the Dambusters Raid, unlike in the film The Dam Busters, in which it is credited to Guy Gibson.

In 1946 Lockspeiser was appointed chief scientist of the Ministry of Supply. He was heavily involved in research into the secret development of a British atomic bomb, supersonic flight, and guided weapons. He was also keen to support the development of electronic computers, notably the Ferranti Mark 1 at Manchester. Lockspeiser was knighted in 1946.

In 1949 he was appointed to succeed Sir Edward Appleton as secretary of the Department of Scientific and Industrial Research (DSIR). He was to have a big influence on major projects, including the Festival of Britain in 1951; the National Lending Library for Science and Technology in 1952; Bernard Lovell's Jodrell Bank radio telescope in 1954; and the creation of CERN, of which he was the first president in 1955–7. Each of these is described in some detail in the Royal Society's biography.

Lockspeiser retired in 1956, and then joined the boards of several companies, including Tube Investments, Staveley, H R Ricardo & Warburg's Bank; in each case he was a scientific consultant, “a pleasant role after the stresses of his official career, especially in the war years, and he enjoyed encouraging his new business colleagues in matters concerning research and development.”

In the 1950s, Lockspeiser's name had appeared quite often in the press, as his views on a wide range of topics were publicised. They ranged from prevention of waste to the future of airfields and from a cross between a car and a helicopter-like plane to forecasting that offices would be equipped with infallible electronic machines, which would foreshadow “the redundancy of much of our present day clerical labour”. He also joined an appeal to the Home Secretary (Gwilym Lloyd George), with Benjamin Britten, John Masefield and others, to abolish hanging. It was eventually abolished ten years later.

An honorary doctorate from the University of Oxford was conferred on Lockspeiser by the vice-chancellor Sir Maurice Bowra on 1 September 1954. He had earlier received an honorary Doctor of Science in engineering from the University of the Witwatersrand in 1949 and a Doctor of Science in technology from Haifa Technion in 1952. Lockspeiser was also FEng (1976), FIMechE (1946), and FRAeS (1944). He was an honorary fellow of Sidney Sussex College (1953) and a life fellow of the Royal Society of Arts, and he was awarded the American medal of freedom (silver palms) in 1946.

== Personal life ==
Lockspeiser married Elsie Shuttleworth, a botanist, in 1920. They had three children: Judith, Frida and David, who became a test pilot and aircraft designer.

Elsie died on 2 January 1964. Two years later he married the widow of an old friend from the RAE, Mary Alice Heywood, who died on 1 December 1983.

Lockspeiser was “at the age of seventeen, already a gifted pianist and cellist”. In 1922 he founded the RAE Orchestral Society, which later became the Farnborough Symphony Orchestra. He was also a keen gardener. His pre-war interest in Communism made him the object of monitoring by the Secret Intelligence Service.

Lockspeiser died on 18 October 1990 at his home, Birchway, 15 Waverley Road, Farnborough, five months short of his one-hundredth birthday. His estate was valued at almost £477,000.

== Fellowships, honours and awards ==
- 1944 Fellow of the Royal Aeronautical Society (FRAeS)
- 1946 Fellow of the Institution of Mechanical Engineers (FIMechE)
- 1946 American Medal of Freedom (silver palms)
- 1949 Fellow of the Royal Society
- 1949 Honorary Doctor of Science in engineering, University of the Witwatersrand
- 1950 KCB
- 1952 Doctor of Science in technology, Haifa Technion
- 1953 Honorary Fellow of Sidney Sussex College, Cambridge
- 1954 Honorary doctorate, University of Oxford
- 1976 Fellow of the Fellowship of Engineering (FEng)
