= Procuration =

Authority granted to an agent for management

Procuration (from Latin procurare 'to take care of') is the action of taking care of, hence management, stewardship, agency. The word is applied to the authority or power delegated to a procurator, or agent, as well as to the exercise of such authority expressed frequently by procuration (per procurationem), or shortly per pro., or simply p.p.

== Etymology, history, and usage ==
The correct usage is the subject of some debate. It has been understood as both "through the agency of" and "on behalf of".

The reason for this is that the meaning of the phrase per procurationem is ambiguous if used with undeclinable English names.

Procuratio is related to the words "pro" (for/on behalf of/instead of) and "cura" (care/attention). It is thus close in meaning to "agency" — acting instead of someone. The phrase 'per procurationem' thus means "by/through agency".

Note that the phrase does not contain a preposition "of". This is because this idea would be expressed through the genitive case in Latin. With time, Latin or Latinized names fell out of usage, and the genitive case of the agent's name (in English "of Mr X") was thus lost. The original would look like this:

Praeses
per procurationem Secretarii

or

Michael Angelo Baltazar Senior
per procurationem Josephi Bloggi Junioris (by agency of Joe Bloggs Jr.)

This seems to be the most simple and logical reading.

The other option is that "per procurationem" could be understood as a complete adverbial phrase in itself — "by the agency [of another]", without a dependent genitive. However, this would mean that two people signed the letter, one in his own person, one "by the agency of another" (without that other being expressly indicated).

== Business usage ==
A common usage of per procurationem in the English-speaking world occurs in business letters, which are often signed on behalf of another person. For example, given a secretary authorized to sign a letter on behalf of the president of a company, the signature takes the form:

p.p. Secretary's Signature
President's Name

or

President's Name
p.p. Secretary's Signature

Commonly in practice, an alternative form is used:

Secretary's Signature
p.p. President's Name

In German-speaking countries, ppa. (per procura autoritate) indicates that the person signing the document has special authority according to commercial law to sign documents in the name and on behalf of the company that a normal employee or representative of the company does not have.

== Ecclesiastical usage ==
In the ecclesiastical law of the Church of England, procuration is the provision of necessaries for bishops and archdeacons during their visitations of parochial churches in their dioceses. Procuration originally took the form of meat, drink, provender, and other accommodation, but was gradually changed to a sum of money. Procuration is an ecclesiastical due, and is therefore suable only in a spiritual court. In those dioceses where the bishops' estates have vested in the ecclesiastical commissioners, procurations are payable to the commissioners, who, however, have abandoned their collection.

== Financial usage ==
Procuration is also used specifically for the negotiation of a loan by an agent for his client, whether by mortgage or otherwise, and the sum of money or commission paid for negotiating it is frequently termed the 'procuration fee'.

== See also ==
- Procurator (disambiguation)
- Procurator (canon law)
