= Jacques de Gastigny =

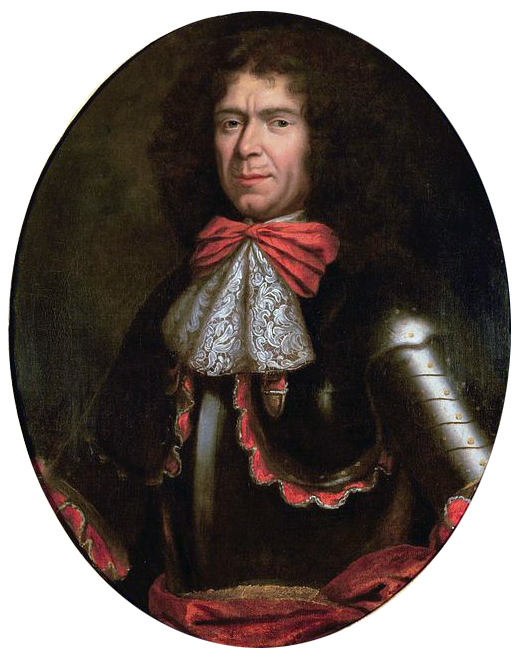
Portrait of Jacques de Gastigny by Pierre Mignard, circa 1680

Jacques de Gastigny (also spelt Gatigny; died 1708), known in England as James Gastigny, was a French Huguenot who served as Master of the Buckhounds to King William III. Through his will he founded the French Protestant Hospital in Finsbury, London, the first voluntary hospital in England.

== Biography ==
Gastigny was a Huguenot military refugee who fled to Holland following the Revocation of the Edict of Nantes in 1685. He was appointed Master of the Hounds to stadtholder William, then Prince of Orange. He followed William to England after the Glorious Revolution and fought alongside him in the Battle of the Boyne in 1690.

He returned with William to England, although apparently, along with other Dutch courtiers of the new king, he did not wish to stay there. Many of those who followed William from Holland feared they would not be given positions at English court, and would be resented by the English. Constantijn Huygens Jr. recorded in his diary that Gastigny told him on 23 March 1689 "that he did not want to stay in London, and that most of the hatred and anger befell the favourite."

However, Gastigny was appointed Master of the Buckhounds to King William on 9 September 1689, staying in this position until 1698. He later appeared on the Patent Rolls as entitled to a £500 pension each year.

Gastigny died in London in 1708.

== Legacy ==
Himself a refugee in Holland, Gastigny wanted to provide for the Huguenot refugees in England. He was a member of the French Committee responsible for distributing the Royal Bounty to the refugees. In his will dated April 1708, he originally left £1,000 (equivalent to £193,503 in 2025) to benefit poor French Protestants – £500 for an infirmary and £500 for a pest house to be converted to a home for the aging.

The funds were allowed to accrue interest. Philippe Ménard, executor of Gastigny's estate, solicited for additional funds through public subscriptions for the hospital, known as La Providence. The hospital opened in 1718 by royal charter, with Henri de Massue, Earl of Galway serving as its first governor.

A painting of Gastigny by Pierre Mignard, circa 1680, is in the collection of the French Hospital, now on display in the Huguenot Museum in Rochester, Kent.

Gastigny Place, located near the original hospital location in St Luke's Parish, was named in his honour. It intersected Radnor Street and Galway Streets, just west of Moorfields Eye Hospital.

Court offices
Preceded by James Grahme	Master of the Buckhounds; 1689–1698	Succeeded by Reinhardt Vincent von Hompesch
