= Procurator =

Procurator (with procuracy or procuratorate referring to the office itself) may refer to:

- Procurator, one engaged in procuration, the action of taking care of, hence management, stewardship, agency
- Procurator (Ancient Rome), the title of various officials of the Roman Empire
- Procurator (Teutonic Knights), a position in the Monastic State of the Teutonic Knights
- Procurator of San Marco, the second most prestigious life appointment in the Republic of Venice
- HM Procurator General and Treasury Solicitor, "HM Procurator General" being one of the positions held by the Treasury Solicitor in the United Kingdom
- Procurator fiscal, the public prosecutor in Scotland
- Procurator to the General Assembly of the Church of Scotland, chief counsel to the General Assembly of the Church of Scotland
- Public procurator, a position in some Roman law systems, analogous to both detective and public prosecutor, including:
  - Procurator (Russia), an office of the Most Holy Synod in the Russian Empire
  - Prosecutor General of Russia, heads the system of official prosecution in courts known as the Office of the Prosecutor General of Russian Federation (Генеральная прокуратура Российской Федерации, Generalnaya prokuratura Rossiyskoy Federatsy)
  - General Prosecutor of Ukraine
  - Procurator General of the Soviet Union, the highest functionary of the Office of Public Procurator of the USSR, responsible for the whole system of offices of public procurators and supervision of their activities on the territory of the Soviet Union
  - People's procuratorates, part of the judicial system of China
    - Supreme People's Procuratorate, China
  - Supreme People's Procuracy of Vietnam, an office of the Vietnamese government
  - General Procuracy of the Republic, Mexico
  - Legal procurator, a warranted legal professional in several countries, including Malta and Argentina.
- Procurator (Finland), the equivalent of Chancellor of Justice of Finland in the Grand Duchy of Finland
- the head of one of the "nations", regionally based separate corporate bodies in certain universities, most famously the medieval University of Paris
- Procurator (Catholic canon law): in a monastery, the monk or nun charged with administering its financial affairs

== Literature ==
- Procurator (novel), an alternate history novel by Kirk Mitchell

== See also ==
- Procurator General (disambiguation)
- Proctor, a kind of supervisor or representative in England
- Procuracies, three buildings in Venice
