= Paul Buissière =

French surgeon and anatomist (died 1739)

Paul Buissière or Bussière (died 1739) was a French surgeon and anatomist, who settled in England.

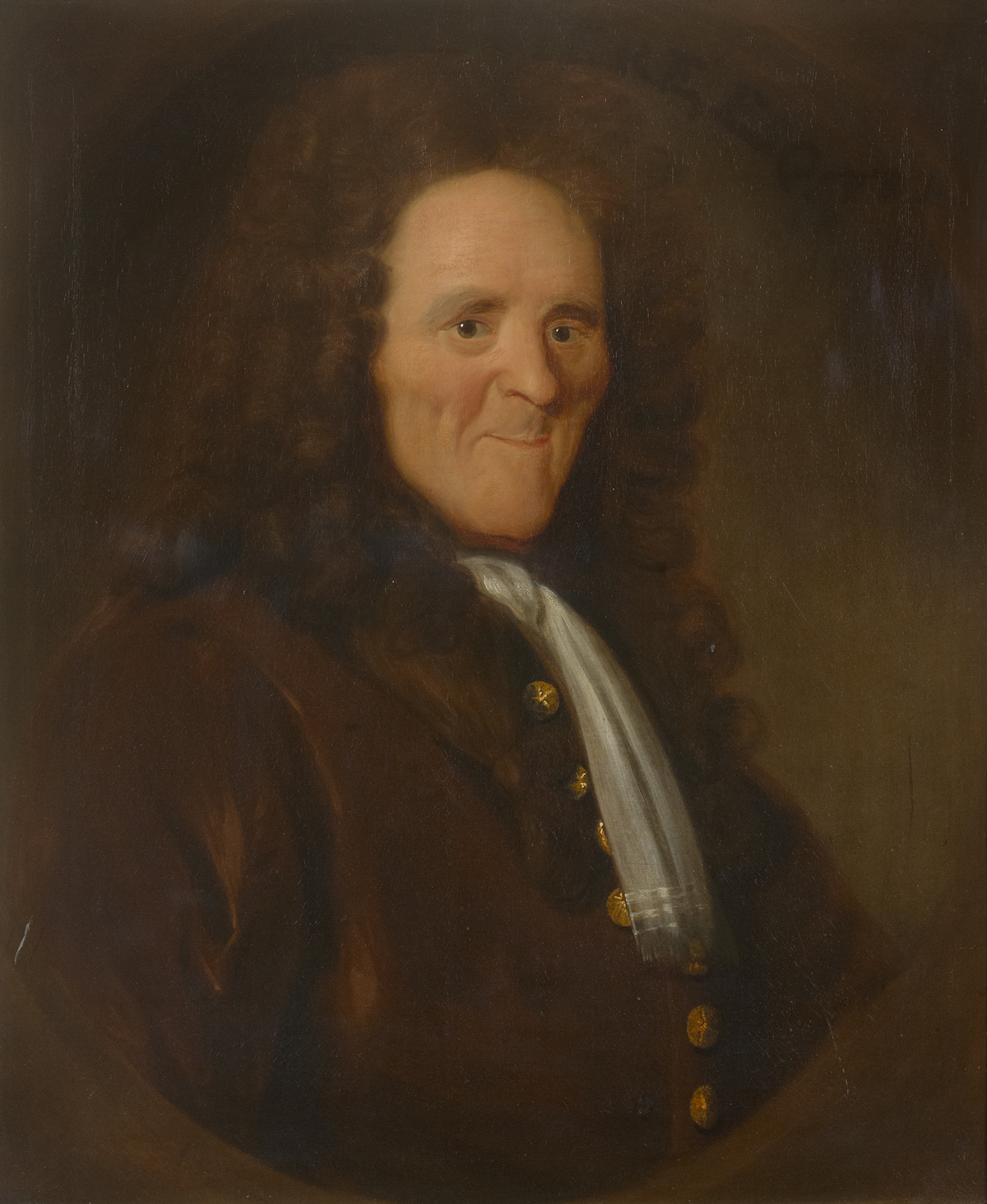
Paul Buissière, 1730s portrait

== Life ==
Buissière was a Huguenot, who practised in the principality of Orange before emigrating first to Copenhagen. He was naturalised in England on 10 October 1688, and built a reputation as a practitioner in Suffolk Street, Pall Mall, London. He was the surgeon who attended the leading statesman Robert Harley when he was stabbed at the Council table by the double agent Antoine de Guiscard, in March 1711; he also attended the assassin after his committal to Newgate Prison. Many years later he was consulted on the last illness of Queen Caroline of Ansbach in November 1737. He was then thought to be at least 80 years old, but was still regarded as the finest physician in London.

Buissière was one of the first to introduce a course of lectures on anatomy and physiology into England. He had been admitted a foreign member of the Royal Society on 22 May 1700, was placed on the home list in 1713, and chosen one of the council in 1719.

Buissière died at his house in Suffolk Street in January 1739, and left money to the French Hospital in London, of which he had been elected governor in 1729.

== Works ==
Buissière wrote:

- Lettre à M. Bourdelin pour servir de réponse au sieur Méry sur l'Usage du Trou ovale dans le Fœtus, Paris, 1700.
- Nouvelle Déscription anatomique du Cœur des Tortues terrestres de l'Amérique et de ses Vaisseaux, Paris, 1713.

He contributed six papers on anatomical subjects to Philosophical Transactions. Other papers were in the Mémoires of the Academy of Sciences of Paris, of which he became a corresponding member in March 1699, and in the Acta Eruditorum. He also maintained a scientific correspondence with Sir Hans Sloane, which went to the archives of the Royal Society.

== Notes ==
Attribution

This article incorporates text from a publication now in the public domain: Stephen, Leslie, ed. (1886). "Buissière, Paul". Dictionary of National Biography. Vol. 7. London: Smith, Elder & Co.
