= John Robethon =

John Robethon, originally Jean Robethon (died 1722) was a French Huguenot diplomat naturalised English. He served as secretary to William III and to George I of Great Britain.

== Life ==
Robethon was born at Authon-du-Perche, north-west France, into a Calvinist family. He is said to have joined the service of King William III when Prince of Orange only. He came to England about 1689, and was naturalised in 1693, being employed by William III, at first in a humble capacity. In 1693 he acted as secretary to Baron Schütz, the Hanoverian envoy in London. Afterwards he passed into the service of the Earl of Portland who, when ambassador to Paris in 1698, took Robethon with him.

In September 1698, Robethon became private secretary to William III. Among William's correspondents, Robethon made an important contact in George William, Duke of Brunswick-Lüneburg, who visited England in 1701. On William's death in 1702, Robethon transferred his services to the Duke, who died in 1705. Robethon then was employed by his son-in-law, George Lewis, the future George I of Great Britain.

Robethon held the threads of an extended European correspondence. The leading Whigs in England kept themselves in touch with the House of Brunswick, and the letters from the Elector's family to their supporters in England were drafted by Robethon. The Duke of Marlborough paid him well for information on the intrigues of Louis XIV at the court of Saxony. Robethon also worked to assist Marlborough in neutralising Charles XII of Sweden, and undermining overtures Louis made to the allies in 1707. He was well informed about the Old Pretender. Worldly, adept and well briefed on English politicians, Robethon had influence with George I, though not with the ladies of the court.

In 1714 Robethon accompanied George I to England, as secretary and counsellor, but was not easily accepted. Sunderland used him and Bothmer in 1716 to split the king from Robert Walpole, who disliked Robethon. Before the return of Walpole to power, Robethon's influence waned.

Robethon made the first French translation of Alexander Pope's An Essay on Criticism (in verse), which was published in Amsterdam and London in 1717. In 1721 he was appointed governor of the French La Providence Hospital in east London. He died in London on 14 April 1722.

== Legacy ==
Some of Robethon's correspondence was in 11 volumes of Hanoverian letters with the Stowe MSS., now in the British Library. The collection was formed around the Electress Sophia's papers, which were entrusted to Robethon by George I on his mother's death in 1714. They were later sold by the executors of the secretary's son, Colonel Robethon, in 1752, to Matthew Duane, and while in his hands were seen by James Macpherson. They were subsequently purchased by Thomas Astle, and in 1803 by the Marquess of Buckingham.

== Family ==
Robethon married Claudine Maxwell, nicknamed "Madame Grenouille", in 1703; she survived him. They had a son, George William Frederick. The couple seem to have had pensions from both George I and his son.
