= Frank Cass =

British publisher (1930–2007)

- Born: 11 July 1930; London, UK
- Died: 9 August 2007 (aged 77)
- Education: Hackney Downs School; Regent Street Polytechnic
- Occupation: Publisher
- Known for: Founder of Frank Cass & Co.
- Spouse: Audrey Steele
- Children: 1 son, 1 daughter

Frank Cass (11 July 1930 – 9 August 2007) was a British publisher. He was the founder of Frank Cass & Co., an imprint of books and journals of history and the social sciences acquired by Taylor & Francis in 2003.

== Early life ==
Frank Cass was born on 11 July 1930 in London. His father was a cabinetmaker, and his mother was of Polish descent. During the Second World War, he was evacuated to Merthyr Tydfil, Wales.

Cass was educated at Hackney Downs School and the Regent Street Polytechnic.

== Career ==
Cass began his career as a bookseller at The Economist Bookshop in Bloomsbury, central London. In 1953, he opened his own bookshop on Southampton Row.

Cass founded a publishing imprint, Frank Cass & Co., in 1957. He first published books of history and the social sciences whose copyright had expired. He later published new research, including biographies and military histories. By the late 1960s, he had purchased the Woburn Press, a publishing house of works of literature. He also started publishing academic journals, beginning with Middle Eastern Studies in 1964. He later published Business History, The Journal of Peasant Studies, The Journal of Commonwealth and Imperial History, West European Politics, Slavery and Abolition, Immigrants and Minorities, Intelligence and National Security, Jewish Culture and History and Holocaust Studies.

Cass purchased Vallentine Mitchell, an imprint of Jewish books, in 1971. In 1972, he purchased the scripts of The Goon Show. In 1974, he purchased the Irish Academic Press, which included the 1,000 volumes of British Parliamentary Papers from 1801 to 1901. He made much of his wealth through the Irish Academic Press. He also founded Vallentine Mitchell Academic in 2003. That year, Cass sold most of his journals to Taylor & Francis for £15 million. However, he retained ownership of the Jewish Culture and History and Holocaust Studies.

== Personal life and death ==
Cass married Audrey Steele. They had a son and a daughter. Cass was Jewish, and he attended a synagogue. He died on 9 August 2007, at the age of 77.
