= Public prosecutor general =

Public Prosecutor General or Prosecutor General may refer to:

- Prosecutor General of Lithuania
- Prosecutors General of Azerbaijan
- Prosecutor General (Albania)
- Prosecutor General of Armenia
- Prosecutor General of the Republic (Brazil)
- Prosecutor General of Finland
- Procureur général (France)
- Public Prosecutor General (Germany)
- Prosecutor-General of Iran
- Public Prosecutor General (Poland)
- Prosecutor-General of Russia
- Prosecutor General of South Korea
- Prosecutor General of Spain
- Prosecutor-General of Sweden
- Prosecutor General of Turkmenistan
- Prosecutor General of Ukraine

== See also ==
- Attorney general
- Procurator General (disambiguation)
- Parquet (legal), the office of the prosecution in some countries
