= Attorney general =

Chief legal advisor to a government

In most common law jurisdictions, the attorney general (pl.: attorneys general) or attorney-general (AG or Atty.-Gen) is the main legal advisor to the government. In some jurisdictions, attorneys general also have executive responsibility for law enforcement and prosecutions, or even responsibility for legal affairs generally. In practice, the extent to which the attorney general personally provides legal advice to the government varies between jurisdictions, and even between individual office-holders within the same jurisdiction, often depending on the level and nature of the office-holder's prior legal experience.

Where the attorney general has ministerial responsibility for legal affairs in general (as is the case, for example, with the United States Attorney General or the Attorney-General for Australia, and the respective attorneys general of the states in each country), the ministerial portfolio is largely equivalent to that of a Minister of Justice in some other countries.

The term was originally used to refer to any person who holds a general power of attorney to represent a principal in all matters. In the common law tradition, anyone who represents the state, especially in criminal prosecutions, is such an attorney. Although a government may designate some official as the permanent attorney general, anyone who came to represent the state in the same way could, in the past, be referred to as such, even if only for a particular case. Today, however, in most jurisdictions, the term is largely reserved as a title of the permanently appointed attorney general of the state, sovereign or other member of the royal family.

Civil law jurisdictions have similar offices, which may be variously called "public prosecutor general", "procurators", "advocates general", "public attorneys", and other titles. Many of these offices also use "attorney general" or "attorney-general" as the English translation of the title, although because of different historical provenance, the nature of such offices is usually different from that of attorneys-general in common law jurisdictions.

== Etymology ==
In regard to the etymology of the phrase Attorney General, Steven Pinker writes that the earliest citation in the Oxford English Dictionary is from 1292: "Tous attorneyz general purrount lever fins et cirrographer" (All general attorneys may levy fines and make legal documents). The phrase was borrowed from Anglo-Norman French when England was ruled by Normans after the conquest of England in the 11th-century. As a variety of French, which was spoken in the law courts, schools, universities and in sections of the gentry and the bourgeoisie, the term relating to government was introduced into English.

The phrase attorney general is composed of a noun followed by the postpositive adjective general and as other French compounds its plural form also appears as attorneys generals. As compared to major generals, a term that also originates from French ("major-général") and also has a postpositive adjective, it also appears incorrectly as "attorney generals". While Steven Pinker writes: "So if you are ever challenged for saying attorney-generals, mother-in-laws, passerbys ... you can reply, 'They are the very model of the modern major general'" (a reference to the Major-General's Song, from the operetta The Pirates of Penzance).

The modern title of major general is a military rank in which the word "general" is not used as an adjective but as a noun, which can be pluralized. In modern public discourse, attorneys general are often referred to or addressed as "general". In this construction, the word "general" is an adjective, and its use as a noun is incorrect. Attorneys general, despite carrying the title of "general", are not military officers and carry no rank.

== Attorneys-general in common law and hybrid jurisdictions ==
Attorneys-General in common law jurisdictions, and jurisdictions with a legal system which is partially derived from the common law tradition, share a common provenance.

=== Australia ===
In Australia, the attorney-general is the chief law officer of the Crown and a member of the Cabinet. The Attorney-General is the minister responsible for legal affairs, national and public security (in conjunction with the Minister for Home Affairs), and has oversight of the Australian Security Intelligence Organisation. Michelle Rowland is the current Attorney-General. The Australian states each have separate attorneys-general, who are state ministers with similar responsibilities to the federal minister with respect to state law.

Functions of the state and federal attorneys-general include the administration of the selection of persons for nomination to judicial posts, and authorizing prosecutions. In normal circumstances, the prosecutorial powers of the attorney-general are exercised by the Director of Public Prosecutions and staff; however, the attorney-general maintains formal control, including the power to initiate and terminate public prosecutions and take over private prosecutions. Statutory criminal law provides that prosecutions for certain offences require the individual consent of the attorney-general. This is generally for offences whose illegality is of a somewhat controversial nature or where there is perceived to be a significant risk that prosecutions of a political nature may be embarked upon. The Attorney-General also generally has the power to issue certificates legally conclusive of certain facts (e.g., that the revelation of certain matters in court proceedings might constitute a risk to national security); the facts stated in such certificates must be accepted by the courts and cannot legally be disputed by any parties. The Attorney-General also has the power to issue a nolle prosequi with respect to a case, which authoritatively determines that the state (in whose name prosecutions are brought) does not wish to prosecute the case, so preventing any person from doing so.

For the attorneys-general of the various states and territories of Australia see:

- Attorney-General of the Australian Capital Territory
- Attorney-General of New South Wales
- Attorney-General of the Northern Territory
- Attorney-General of Queensland
- Attorney-General of South Australia
- Attorney-General of Tasmania
- Attorney-General of Victoria
- Attorney-General of Western Australia

=== Canada ===
The Attorney General of Canada (French: Procureur général du Canada) is a separate title held by the Canadian Minister of Justice (Ministre de la Justice), a member of the Cabinet. The Minister of Justice is concerned with questions of policy and their relationship to the justice system. In their role as attorney general, they are the chief law officer of the Crown.

A separate cabinet position, the Minister of Public Safety (Ministre de la Sécurité publique), formerly the "Solicitor General", administers the law enforcement agencies (police, prisons, and security) of the federal government.

For the attorneys-general of the various provinces of Canada see:

- Alberta Minister of Justice and Attorney General
- Attorney General of British Columbia
- Minister of Justice and Attorney General (Manitoba)
- Office of the Attorney General (New Brunswick)
- Minister of Justice and Public Safety and Attorney General of Newfoundland and Labrador
- Minister of Justice of the Northwest Territories
- Attorney General and Minister of Justice of Nova Scotia
- Minister of Justice of Nunavut
- Attorney General of Ontario
- Minister of Justice and Public Safety and Attorney General of Prince Edward Island
- Ministry of Justice (Quebec) (also as attorney general)
- Minister of Justice and Attorney General of Saskatchewan
- Minister of Justice (Yukon)

=== Cyprus ===
The Attorney General of the Republic is an independent official of the Republic of Cyprus, the head of the Legal Service of the state and the legal advisor to the Government of Cyprus. Hierarchically, it is the third-highest institution of the state, after the President of the Republic and the President of the Parliament. This institution originates from the time of the British rule, and was preserved even after the independence of Cyprus in 1960 due to the Anglo-Saxon law which continues to exist in Cyprus, as in other Commonwealth states.

=== Fiji ===
In Fiji, the role of the attorney general is defined as "providing essential legal expertise and support to the Government". More specific functions include "legislative drafting", "legal aid", "the prerogative of mercy" (advising the President), "liquor licensing" and "film censorship".

The current Attorney General is Aiyaz Sayed-Khaiyum. In January 2008, he sparked controversy by accepting other government positions in addition to his role as attorney general. Sayed-Khaiyum is currently responsible also for "Public Enterprise, Electoral Reform and Anti-Corruption". An article in the Fiji Times pointed out that "never before in the history of this nation has the Attorney-General held a portfolio dealing with matters other than the law and the judiciary", and criticised the decision.

=== Hong Kong ===
The Secretary for Justice, known as the attorney-general before the handover of Hong Kong in 1997, is the legal adviser to the Hong Kong Government and heads the Department of Justice. They are assisted by five law officers, namely:

- the Solicitor General who heads the Legal Policy Division,
- the Director of Public Prosecutions who head the Prosecutions Division,
- the Law Officer (Civil Law) who heads the Civil Law Division,
- the Law Officer (International Law) who heads the International Law Division, and
- the Law Draftsman who heads the Law Drafting Division

(The Administration and Development Division is headed by an Administrative Officer.)

Crimes and offences are prosecuted at the suit of the Secretary of Justice.

The Secretary of Justice, appointed by the Chinese government on the advice of the Chief Executive of Hong Kong, is an ex officio member of the Executive Council of Hong Kong. The position is normally held by a legal professional, and was, before July 2002, a civil service position.

=== India ===
The Attorney General for India is the Indian government's chief legal advisor, and is its principal Advocate before the Supreme Court of India. They are appointed by the President of India on the advice of the Union Cabinet under Article 76(1) of the Constitution and hold office during the pleasure of the President. The current Attorney General for India is R. Venkataramani.

=== Ireland ===
The Attorney General of Ireland is the legal adviser to the Government and is therefore the chief law officer of the State. The attorney general as of 17 December 2022 is Rossa Fanning, SC.

The Office of the Attorney General is made up of a number of different offices:

- The Attorney General's Office (located at Merrion Street, Dublin 2) containing the Advisory Counsel to the Attorney General
- The Office of Parliamentary Counsel to the Government (also located at Merrion Street, Dublin 2) containing the Parliamentary Counsel who draft legislation and have responsibilities in the area of Statute Law revision
- The Chief State Solicitor's Office (CSSO) (located at Little Ship Street, Dublin 8) containing the solicitors representing the Attorney and the State.

Since the enactment of the Prosecution of Offenses Act 1974, the responsibility for the prosecution of indictable criminal offences is mostly in the hands of the Director of Public Prosecutions who is independent of the attorney general and the State.

=== Isle of Man ===
In the Isle of Man, the Attorney General is a Crown appointment (appointed by the UK government) and sits in the Legislative Council of the Isle of Man, ex officio.

=== Israel ===
The Attorney General of Israel is the head of the public prosecution from the state, the person who advises the government in legal matters, the person who represents the state's authorities in the courts, and advises in preparation of law memoranda of the government in general and the Justice Minister in particular (likewise he examines and advises for private proposals for a law of Knesset members).

=== Jamaica ===
This is a position which existed in Jamaica for a long time.

The Hon. Marlene Malahoo Forte, QC, MP is the new Attorney General of Jamaica as of March 7, 2016.

=== Kenya ===
In Kenya the Attorney General is the Principal Legal Adviser to the Government and ex officio Member of Parliament and Cabinet. His duties include the formulation of legal policy and ensuring proper administration of Kenya's legal system including professional legal education. Assisting the attorney general in the performance of his duties as principal legal adviser to the government are:

- Solicitor general
- Senior Deputy Solicitor General
- Director of Public Prosecutions
- Registrar General
- Administrator General
- Chairman of Advocates Complaints Commission
- Chief Parliamentary Counsel
- Chief State Counsel

The Hon. Justice (Rtd) Paul Kihara Kariuki is the Attorney-General of Kenya as of April 2018.

=== Kiribati ===
In Kiribati, the attorney general is defined by section 42 of the Constitution as "the principal legal adviser to the Government". The Constitution specifies: "No person shall be qualified to hold or to act in the office of Attorney-General unless he is qualified to practise in Kiribati as an advocate in the High Court." The current Attorney General, as of 2016, was the Honourable Tetiro Semilota, until her nomination as Acting Chief Justice in October 2022.

=== Malaysia ===
In Malaysia the attorney-general or Peguam Negara (as he is referred to in Bahasa Melayu) is the principal legal adviser to the Government. He is also the principal public prosecutor in the country, and is also known as the Public Prosecutor. He has the power, exercisable at his discretion, to institute, conduct or discontinue any proceedings for an offence, other than proceedings before a Shariah court, a native court or a court-martial. The current Attorney-General of Malaysia is Idris Harun since 2020.

=== Mauritius ===
In Mauritius, the attorney-general, who should be a barrister, is the principal legal adviser to the government and holds the office of a minister.

The Attorney-General's Office is also responsible for the drafting of legislation, and vetting of all contracts or agreements of which the government is a party, including international agreements, treaties or conventions.

=== Nepal ===
In Nepal, the attorney general is the chief legal adviser of the Government of Nepal as well as its chief public prosecutor. An Attorney General is appointed by the President on recommendation of the Prime Minister. The Attorney General's Office is a constitutional body under the Constitution of Nepal (2015). For a person to be eligible for the post of Attorney General, they must also be qualified to be appointed as a judge of the Supreme Court.

=== New Zealand ===
In New Zealand, the attorney-general is the chief law officer and primary legal advisor of the New Zealand government. The Attorney-General is the Minister responsible for the Crown Law Office, the Parliamentary Counsel Office, and the Serious Fraud Office. Historically, the post could be held either by a politician or by a senior jurist, but today, it is invariably held by a member of Parliament. The Attorney-General attends Cabinet, but the post is not the same as the Minister of Justice. By tradition, persons appointed to the position of Attorney-General have been lawyers. Only two former attorneys-general have not been lawyers, most recently Dr Michael Cullen who held the post in 2005, and again from 2006.

=== Pakistan ===
The Attorney-General of Pakistan is the chief legal adviser to the government of Pakistan and its principal public prosecutor.

=== Philippines ===
The Attorney General of the Philippines was an office that existed from 1901 until 1932, when the office was abolished and its functions taken over by the Secretary of Justice. Since then, the Solicitor General of the Philippines, previously the second law officer, has been the principal law officer and legal defender of the Philippine Government. The Office of the Solicitor General is the law firm of the Republic of the Philippines. It is tasked with representing the Philippines, the Philippine Government, and all its officials in any litigation or matter requiring the services of a lawyer especially before appellate courts. It is an independent and autonomous office attached to the Department of Justice for budgetary purposes.

=== Samoa ===
In Samoa, the attorney general is the legal adviser to the government. Since 2016, the current attorney general is Lemalu Hermann Retzlaff (whose father Misa Telefoni Retzlaff also served as attorney general from 1986 to 1988).

=== Singapore ===
The Attorney-General of Singapore is the legal adviser to the government of the Republic of Singapore and its public prosecutor. The current Attorney-General is Lucien Wong.

=== Sri Lanka ===
The attorney-general of Sri Lanka is the chief legal adviser of the Government of Sri Lanka and head of the attorney-general department which is the public prosecutor.

=== Sudan ===
As of 10 October 2019, the Attorney General of Sudan is Tag el-Sir el-Hibir.

=== Tonga ===
The office of Attorney General was established in Tonga in 1988, and was held jointly with the portfolio of Justice Minister until the two were separated in 2009. The Attorney General is defined as the "Chief Legal Advisor to Government".

=== Trinidad & Tobago ===
According to the Constitution of Trinidad and Tobago, the supreme law of the nation, The Attorney General shall be responsible for the administration of legal affairs in Trinidad and Tobago and legal proceedings for and against the State shall be taken— (a) in the case of civil proceedings, in the name of the attorney general; (b) in the case of criminal proceedings, in the name of the State.

=== United Kingdom ===
==== England and Wales ====
The Attorney General for England and Wales is similarly the chief law officer of the Crown in England and Wales, and advises and represents the Crown and government departments in court. In practice, the Treasury Solicitor (who also has the title of Procurator General) normally provides the lawyers or briefs Treasury counsel to appear in court, although the attorney general may appear in person. The person appointed to this role provides legal advice to the government, acts as the representative of the public interest and resolves issues between government departments.

The Attorney General has supervisory powers over the prosecution of criminal offences, but is not personally involved with prosecutions; however, some prosecutions (e.g. riot) cannot be commenced without their consent, and they have the power to halt prosecutions generally. Criminal prosecutions are the responsibility of the Crown Prosecution Service, headed by the Director of Public Prosecutions. The Attorney General may appeal cases to the higher courts where, although the particular case is settled, there may be a point of law of public importance at issue.

The Attorney General's deputy is the Solicitor General for England and Wales.

Under the Government of Wales Act 2006, the Counsel General is the chief legal adviser to the Welsh Government.

==== Northern Ireland ====
Since the prorogation of the Parliament of Northern Ireland in 1972, the Attorney General for England and Wales was also Attorney General for Northern Ireland. The separate office of Attorney General for Northern Ireland was re-created alongside the new office of Advocate General for Northern Ireland upon the devolution of policing and justice powers to the Northern Ireland Assembly in 2010.

==== Scotland ====
Historically, the Lord Advocate was the equivalent for Scotland of the attorney general for England and Wales, being a legal advisor to the King of Scotland. After the Acts of Union 1707, the Lord Advocate became the chief legal advisor to the British government in respect of Scotland.

Under constitutional reforms enacted in 1999, the Lord Advocate has become an officer of the Scottish Government, while the United Kingdom government is advised on Scots law by the Advocate General for Scotland, a position created in 1999.

The lord advocate is assisted by the Solicitor General for Scotland. The Advocate General is assisted by the solicitor to the Advocate General for Scotland, based in Edinburgh.

==== Other attorneys general in the UK ====
The attorney general of the Duchy of Cornwall is the chief legal adviser to the Prince of Wales, and there is a separate attorney general for the Duchy of Lancaster, an appointment that is held by the Crown.

=== United States ===
In the federal government of the United States, the Attorney General is a member of the Cabinet and, as head of the Department of Justice, is the top law enforcement officer and lawyer for the government. The Attorney General may need to be distinguished from the Solicitor General, a high Justice Department official with the responsibility of representing the government before the Supreme Court. In cases of exceptional importance, however, the attorney general may choose personally to represent the government to the Supreme Court.

The individual U.S. states and territories, as well as the federal district of Washington, D.C. also have attorneys general with similar responsibilities. The majority of state attorneys general are chosen by popular election, as opposed to the U.S. Attorney General, who is a presidential appointee confirmed by the Senate.

In nearly all United States jurisdictions, the attorney general is that jurisdiction's chief law enforcement officer; as such, an attorney general may also be considered a police rank. The proper way to address a person holding the office is Mister or Madam Attorney General, or just as Attorney General. The plural is "Attorneys General" or "Attorneys-General".

=== Zimbabwe ===
The Attorney General is the chief legal advisor of the government of Zimbabwe. The office falls under the Ministry of Justice and Legal Affairs.

== Similar offices in non-common law jurisdictions ==
Non-common law jurisdictions usually have one or more offices which are similar to attorneys-general in common law jurisdictions, some of which use "attorney-general" as the English translation of their titles.

=== Iceland ===
The state attorney (ríkislögmaður) represents the state in civil lawsuits. The state attorney is appointed by the Prime Minister for a period of 5 years and must have the same qualifications required to serve as a Supreme Court justice. The state prosecutor (ríkissaksóknari) represents the state in criminal trials and is appointed by the Minister of Justice for an indefinite period. The Minister of Justice oversees the judiciary, prosecution, policing, prison system et al.

=== Netherlands ===
In the Netherlands, there are two types of attorneys-general, that are only historically related.

The first type of attorney-general ("advocaat-generaal" in Dutch) is the public prosecutor in criminal cases at appellate courts.

The second type of attorney-general ("procureur-generaal", while their replacements are called "advocaat-generaal") is an independent advisor to the Supreme Court. These people give an opinion on cases (called "conclusies") in any field of law (not just criminal law), supported by a scientific staff. The Supreme Court may either follow or reject the opinion of the attorney-general (which is published together with the eventual decision). In a way, an attorney-general acts as yet another judge, but in the Dutch system that does not allow dissenting opinions to be published, it is the only way to reflect different perceptions on a case. The Procureur-Generaal also prosecutes members of parliament in the case of misfeance.

Dutch attorneys-general do not normally advise the government.

== See also ==
- Justice minister
- Public prosecutor general (disambiguation)
- Procurator General (disambiguation)
