= Roland Camberton =

British writer

Roland Camberton (1921–1965) was a British writer whose real name was Henry Cohen. He won the 1951 Somerset Maugham Award, given to authors under the age of 35, for his novel Scamp. The book had earlier received a merciless review in the Times Literary Supplement upon publication in late 1950:

The book is written from the standpoint of the "bum": that bearded and corduroyed figure who may be seen crouching over a half of bitter in the corner of a Bloomsbury "pub"; it is ostensibly concerned with the rise and fall of a short-lived literary review, but Mr. Camberton, who appears to be devoid of any narrative gift, makes this an excuse for dragging in disconnectedly and to little apparent purpose a series of thinly disguised local or literary celebrities. Πο

The following year, he published Rain on the Pavements. A novel reflecting Jewish life in Hackney during the thirties, this book received a much more positive review (this one from Julian Symons). Camberton then vanished off the literary map. He does not appear to have published any books after 1951. Indeed, few details of his life are available, and there is no mention of him whatsoever in The Times archives. The writer Iain Sinclair has described him in an interview as a "Hackney writer". He did, indeed, attend Hackney Downs School (formerly The Grocers' Company's School) until 1938 and two poems by him were published in the School Magazine (The Review). He was buried under his birth name, Henry Cohen, in Rainham Jewish Cemetery in 1965.

In August 2008 Iain Sinclair wrote a long piece on Camberton for The Guardian in which he reveals much of his research, including the story of Cohen's early death and the existence of a daughter. Both Scamp and Rain on the Pavements were republished by New London Editions in 2010 with reproductions of the original covers by the artist John Minton.

In 2021, the 'TLS' in a retrospective said, "he vanished off the literary map and died, forgotten, in the mid-1960s, aged just forty-four. His centenary this month is a good opportunity to reassess this unfairly neglected writer."
