= Cardinal Pole Catholic School =

Location
- 205, Morning Lane; Homerton, London, E9 6LG; England; 51°32′48″N 0°02′48″W

Information
- Type: Voluntary aided comprehensive
- Religious affiliation: Roman Catholic
- Established: 1956
- Local authority: Hackney
- Department for Education URN: 100285 Tables
- Ofsted: Reports
- Headteacher: Adam Hall
- Gender: Mixed
- Age: 11 to 19
- Enrolment: 1,369 pupils
- Colour: Grey Red ◻️🟥
- Website: http://www.cardinalpole.co.uk/

Cardinal Pole Catholic School is a mixed converter academy, located in the Homerton area of the London Borough of Hackney, United Kingdom.

== History ==
Since the 'Building Schools for the Future' programme, all pupils (years 7–13) have been housed in the same building on Morning Lane.

Before then, the school had two sites. The lower school, in Victoria Park Road, was originally the French Hospital (La Providence), a hospital serving French Protestants, which opened in 1865. The building is now the home of the Mossbourne Victoria Park Academy.

The upper school, in Kenworthy Road, was closed in 2011 and demolished, before Ickburgh School was built on the site.

In 2024, Cardinal Pole became a converter academy, having previously been a voluntary aided secondary school. It forms part of the Lux Mundi Catholic Academy Trust.

It is named after Cardinal Reginald Pole, the last Roman Catholic Archbishop of Canterbury.

== Religion ==
Cardinal Pole is a Roman Catholic school, although it admits non-Catholic pupils. A religious assembly attended by staff and pupils is held once a week for each year group. On occasion, masses are held. Every pupil is required to take Religious Education at GCSE level, in keeping with the school's religious ethos. A non-examination Religious Education Programme is also followed by all sixth-form students.

== Notable people ==
- Kenny Thomas (b. 1968) - singer
- Darren Purse (b. 1977) - footballer
- Richard Breen (b. 1979) - also known as "Abz Love", member of the 90s boyband 5ive
- Oscar Murillo (b. 1986) - artist and 2019 Turner Prize winner
- Lily Loveless (b. 1990) - actor
- Michael Oku (b. 1993) - professional wrestler
- Bukky Bakray (b. 2002) - actress and writer
