= Mossbourne Community Academy =

Location
- 100 Downs Park Road; Lower Clapton, Greater London, E5 8JY; England; 51.55138°N 0.06193°W

Information
- Type: Academy
- Motto: Fulfilling Your True Potential
- Established: 2004; 22 years ago
- Founder: Sir Clive Bourne
- Department for Education URN: 134693 Tables
- Ofsted: Reports
- Principal: Rebecca Warren
- CEO: Peter Hughes
- Gender: Coeducational
- Age: 11 to 19
- Enrolment: 1,455
- Houses: Milton, Mandela, Malala, Moore, Blackman, Butler, Bevan, Bronte
- Colours: Grey, Red
- Website: www.mca.mossbourne.org

Mossbourne Community Academy, or MCA, is a coeducational secondary school and sixth form with academy status, located near Hackney Downs off the A104 road, in the Lower Clapton area of the London Borough of Hackney in England.

== Buildings ==
The school was first opened in 2004 on the site of the former Hackney Downs School. The site had been purchased by Sir Clive Bourne who founded the school as one of the first "City Academies" in England. Bourne commissioned the Rogers Stirk Harbour + Partners to design the new school buildings, which cost £19,000,000

== Description ==
The first principal of the school was Michael Wilshaw, who left the school to become Chief Inspector of Schools In England and head of Ofsted in January 2012. The school opened a sixth form building in September 2009 which cost £7.7 million; they named it in memory of the late Clive Bourne as the "Sir Clive Sixth Form Centre". The school has a specialism in music.

Since its opening Mossbourne Community Academy has been regularly cited as one of the top performing inner city schools in England, and used as an example of the success of the academy model for schools in general. As of 2024, the head of the academy is Rebecca Warren.

== Mossbourne Federation ==
In September 2014 the Mossbourne Federation was established. The Federation opened a sister school near Victoria Park, Hackney, Mossbourne Victoria Park Academy, which operates under similar policies to the original school. In September 2015 the Federation opened two primary schools, one near the site of the Queen Elizabeth Olympic Park named Mossbourne Riverside Academy, and acquired the former Brooke Community School which is currently named Mossbourne Parkside Academy in Hackney Downs.

== Safeguarding ==
In 2024, concerns were raised by parents and professionals about the school's treatment of children. This originally related to the linked academy Mossbourne Victoria Park Academy, but by December 2024 there were also allegations of emotional abuse of children at Mossbourne Community Academy. Hackney's independent child safeguarding commissioner intends to convene a multi-agency meeting to determine whether to undertake a child safeguarding practice review. The Department for Education said "These allegations are deeply distressing. ... We are working urgently with the local authority and the Mossbourne Federation to establish the facts and any necessary action".

== Alumni ==
- Orla Hill, actress
- Nahum Melvin-Lambert, who is a professional footballer and has played for Reading and St Patrick's Athletic, studied at Mossbourne.
- Precious Mustapha, actress
