= Geoffrey Alderman =

British historian

- Born: 10 February 1944 (age 82); Middlesex, England, UK
- Occupation: Historian

Academic background
- Education: Lincoln College, Oxford
- Website: http://www.geoffreyalderman.com/

Geoffrey Alderman (born 10 February 1944) is a British historian who specialises in 19th and 20th centuries Jewish community in England. He is also a political adviser and journalist.

== Life ==
Born in Middlesex, Alderman was educated at Hackney Downs School (then a grammar school), then studied history at Lincoln College, Oxford, from 1962, graduating with a BA in 1965 and an MA and D.Phil. in 1969. After short academic contracts at University College London, and the universities of Swansea and Reading, he joined Royal Holloway College (University of London) in 1972, lecturing in politics and contemporary history. He was made Professor of Politics and Contemporary History in 1988.

From 1989 to 1994, he held senior administrative posts in the University of London and from 1994 to 1999 in Middlesex University. From 1999, he has worked in the private educational sector, in the US (Touro College) and, from 2002 to 2006, at the American InterContinental University, London, where he was Academic Dean and Senior Vice-President. On 1 June 2007, Alderman joined the academic staff of the University of Buckingham.

In 1971, he was elected a Fellow of the Royal Historical Society and in 1991 a Fellow (now a Life Fellow) of the Royal Society of Arts.

In 2006, he was awarded the degree of Doctor of Letters by the University of Oxford for his important work on Anglo-Jewish history. In 2010, he was appointed a Visiting Fellow of the Oxford Centre for Higher Education Policy Studies. At a ceremony in London on 6 March 2011, Alderman was named the winner of the Chaim Bermant Prize for Journalism 2011.

He describes himself as an unconventional Orthodox Jew.

Alderman has occasionally contributed to Iran's PressTV channel. In 2011, he made four such appearances and donated his appearance fees of £300 to Israel.

== Opinions ==
=== Higher education in Britain ===
In the summer of 2008, following Alderman's inaugural professorial lecture at the University of Buckingham, and criticisms of some aspects of UK higher education by the UK Quality Assurance Agency for Higher Education, a brief parliamentary inquiry was undertaken into these allegations.

At that inquiry (17 July 2008) the chairman of the House of Commons' Select Committee on Innovation, Universities and Skills accused the Quality Assurance Agency of being "toothless" and declared that the British degree classification system had "descended into farce".

Alderman himself gave written and oral evidence to a subsequent inquiry of the Select Committee into Students and Universities, whose report (2 August 2009) included an endorsement of Alderman's views.

=== Palestinians in Gaza ===
In 2009, Alderman sparked another controversy when he argued that, according to Jewish religious law, every Palestinian in Gaza who voted for Hamas was a "legitimate target." He articulated his position in a debate with rabbi David J. Goldberg in The Guardian's commentary section. He argues that according to the Halakha, "it is entirely legitimate to kill a rodef – that is to say, one who endangers the life of another – and this is true, incidentally, even if the rodef has not yet actually taken another life".

=== Haredi sexual harassment ===
In early 2012, The Jewish Chronicle reported that complaints were made against a column by Alderman in which he wrote that "it is well known that Charedi men are notorious harassers of the opposite sex", that these comments breached accuracy and discrimination rules. The Press Complaints Commission rejected these complaints, saying that it was clear to readers that the content was written from Alderman's own perspective and whether or not the article was offensive required subjective judgement.

== Works ==
Of Alderman's dozen or so books, the best-known is Modern British Jewry (second edition, 1998, OUP). He has also written for the New Dictionary of National Biography, with special responsibility for post-1800 Jewish entries, and for The Guardian and The Jewish Chronicle. He is a columnist for the Jewish Telegraph.

=== Principal publications ===
As author:

- The History of Hackney Downs School (London, 1971)
- The Railway Interest (Leicester University. Press, 1973) (Reprinted by Gregg Revivals, 1993)
- British Elections: Myth and Reality (B.T.Batsford, 1978)
- The Jewish Community in British Politics (Oxford University. Press, 1983)
- Pressure Groups and Government in Great Britain (Longman, 1984; 2nd impression 1987)
- Modern Britain 1700–1983: A Domestic History (Croom Helm 1986; reprinted 1987)
- The Federation of Synagogues, 1887–1987 (Federation of Synagogues, 1987)
- London Jewry and London Politics 1889–1986 (Routledge, 1989)
- Britain: A One-Party State? (Christopher Helm, 1989)
- Modern British Jewry (Oxford University Press, 1992; 2nd edn 1998)
- Controversy and Crisis: Studies in the History of the Jews in Modern Britain (Academic Studies Press, 2008)
- The Communal Gadfly (Academic Studies Press, 2009)
- Hackney Downs 1876–1995: The Life and Death of a School (2012)

as editor:

- Governments, Ethnic Groups and Political Representation (editor and contributor) (European Science Foundation and Dartmouth Publishing, Aldershot, 1993)
- Outsiders and Outcasts: Essays in Honour of William J. Fishman (joint editor with C. Holmes, and contributor) (Duckworth, London, 1993)
- New Directions in Anglo-Jewish History (Academic Studies Press, 2010)

other works:

- The History of the Hendon Synagogue 1928–1978 (London, 1978)
- The Jewish Vote in Great Britain since 1945 (University of Strathclyde Studies in Public Policy No. 72, 1980)
- The Jewish Shops Panel: A Guide for Jewish Market Traders (written with G. Hudes, Scott Markets Ltd., 1981)
- Anglo-Jewry: A Suitable Case For Treatment (privately published, 1990) [Inaugural Lecture delivered 17 October 1989]
- Academic Duty and Communal Obligation: Some Thoughts on the writing of Anglo-Jewish History (Centre for Jewish Studies, University of London, 1994)
- The Holocaust: Why Did Anglo-Jewry Stand Idly By? (Graduate School of Jewish Studies, Touro College, New York, 2001)
