= Reggie Bullen =

British air force officer in World War II

Air Vice-Marshall Reginald Bullen CB, GM
- Nickname: Reggie
- Born: 19 October 1920
- Died: 27 January 2008 (aged 87)
- Allegiance: United Kingdom
- Branch: Royal Air Force
- Rank: Air Vice-Marshal
- Conflicts: Second World War
- Other work: College Bursar; Health Authority Administrator

Air Vice-Marshal Reginald Bullen CB GM (19 October 1920 – 27 January 2008) was a British Royal Air Force officer. In later life he was senior bursar and life fellow of Gonville and Caius, chairman of Huntingdon District Health Authority and property development consultant.

== Wartime service ==
Bullen studied to become a solicitor but enlisted in Royal Air Force after the outbreak of the Second World War.

His first posting was to 39 (Beaufort) Squadron, flying torpedo bomber sorties against enemy shipping in the Mediterranean Theatre. From 39 Squadron Bullen then moved to 458 Squadron of the Royal Australian Air Force operating Wellington Bombers.

=== George Medal ===
It was while serving with 458 Squadron that Bullen carried out the action for which he was awarded the George Medal in the spring of 1944. Returning from an operation over Italy, Bullen's aircraft suffered an engine failure as it approached its home airfield and crashed. He was thrown clear, receiving severe injuries to his arms, back and legs. In spite of this he made his way into the burning wreckage and rescued the wireless operator. Bullen received burns in addition to his other injuries.

== Later service ==
Once recovered from his injuries, Bullen was certified as unfit for active service. He was reassigned to administrative duties and rose through the ranks. His rise took him to the post of Adjutant-General HQ Allied Air Forces Central Europe between 1965 and 1968.

The last RAF appointment Bullen held was Air Officer Administration, Training Command between 1972 and 1975. It was from this post that he retired from the air force and was appointed a Companion of the Order of the Bath (CB).
