= Maurice Vile =

British political scientist (1927–2025)

- Born: Maurice John Crawley Vile; 23 July 1927; Stoke Newington, London, England
- Died: 6 May 2025 (aged 97)
- Occupation: Political scientist

Academic background
- Education: Hackney Downs School; Regent Street Polytechnic; London School of Economics

Academic work
- Discipline: Political science
- Institutions: University of Exeter; Nuffield College, Oxford; University of Kent; Boston University; Canterbury Christ Church College
- Military career
- Allegiance: United Kingdom
- Branch: British Army
- Service years: 1945–1948
- Rank: Officer
- Units: 4th/7th Royal Dragoon Guards, Royal Armoured Corps
- Deployment: Palestine

Maurice John Crawley Vile (23 July 1927 – 6 May 2025) was a British political scientist. His main areas of interest were constitutional theory, federalism, the separation of powers, American government and politics.

== Early life ==
Vile was born on 23 July 1927 in Stoke Newington, East London, and moved to Victoria Park, South Hackney, three years later. His father Edward was a packer at a textile warehouse, Jeremiah Rotherham and Company in Shoreditch, until it was destroyed in the Second World War. In 1938 he gained a London County Council Scholarship to Hackney Downs School and moved with the School when it was evacuated to Norfolk in 1939. In 1943 he returned to London and studied for a year at the Regent Street Polytechnic, before entering the London School of Economics, then relocated to Cambridge.

In 1945 he enlisted in the Royal Armoured Corps, and was commissioned in 1947. He served with the 4th/7th Royal Dragoon Guards in Palestine until shortly before the creation of Israel in 1948.

== Academic career ==
Vile was successively a lecturer in government at the University of Exeter, a research fellow at Nuffield College, Oxford, and Professor of Political Science at the University of Kent. A founding member of the University of Kent, he became successively dean of social sciences, pro-vice chancellor and deputy vice chancellor. He was a visiting professor at the University of Massachusetts, and at Smith College, as well as director of Boston University London Programmes, and research director at Canterbury Christ Church College (now University). He was made an honorary fellow of Canterbury Christ Church University in recognition of the role he played in its development. He was an emeritus professor of political science in the University of Kent.

== Death ==
Vile died after six months of illness on 6 May 2025, at the age of 97.

== Publications: books ==
- The Structure of American Federalism, Oxford University Press, 1961, 206pp.
- Constitutionalism and the Separation of Powers. Oxford: Clarendon Press. 1967 – via Internet Archive. 359pp.; Second edition with new chapter and bibliography, Liberty Fund, Indianapolis, 1998; Chinese edition, published by SDX Joint Publishing Company, Beijing, 1997; Spanish edition published by the Centro de Estudios
- Políticos y Constitucionales, Madrid, 2007.
- Politics in the U.S.A., Allen Lane, 1970, Pelican Books edition, 1973; published by Hutchinsons, 1976; 6th. edition, Routledge, 2007, 237pp. French edition: Le régime des Etats-Unis, Editions du Seuil, Paris 1972.
- Federalism in the United States, Canada and Australia, Research paper no. 2, The Royal Commission on the Constitution, 1973, 48pp.
- The Presidency: American Historical Documents, Vol. IV, Harraps, 1974, 210pp.
- General Editor, The Penguin Interdisciplinary Readings, 5 volumes, Penguin Books, London.
