= Clive Bourne =

British businessman and philanthropist (1942–2007)

Sir Clive Bourne (27 September 1942 in Stoke Newington, London – 10 January 2007 in Nevis, West Indies) was a British businessman

== Early life ==
Clive Bourne was born in a Stoke Newington hospital, but his family was from Ilford; his father, Moss Bourne, was a founder of Ilford Synagogue. He was educated at the William McEntee School, Walthamstow but left at age 15, and worked in an import-export business.

== Career ==
He realised the need to speed up deliveries between the United Kingdom and the rest of Europe, and in 1962 set up an overnight parcel service, Seabourne Express Courier. It became one of the largest firms of its type, and won Queen's Awards for export achievement in 1981 and 1988. The company was subjected to demands by the Arab Boycott Office to stop services to Israel, which he refused.

He helped to build Kent International Airport's passenger terminal, and when it opened in 1989 he named the VIP lounge after local Jewish philanthropist, Sir Moses Montefiore.

== Charitable work ==
He used his wealth to assist Jewish and other charities. He was a founder patron of Jewish Care and a founder and governor of King Solomon High School, Barkingside.

Following his diagnosis with prostate cancer in 1991, he founded the Prostate Cancer Research Foundation. In 1996, he helped to found the Museum of Docklands; a gallery is named after his mother-in-law, Esther Ingram.

In 2002, he bought Hackney Downs School (which had closed in 1995) and engaged Sir Richard Rogers to convert it into a city academy; it is called Mossbourne Community Academy in memory of his father. He took a close interest in it, and visited frequently.

He was knighted in 2005.

== Other ==
He was a Justice of the Peace in the London Borough of Newham from 1990 (chairman, 1995).
