= Dennis Lyons =

British scientist (1916–2011)

Dennis "Joe" Lyons (26 August 1916 – 29 March 2011) was a British scientist who researched topics ranging from rockets to roundabouts. He led the research of the Blue Streak and Black Knight rockets that were developed at the Royal Aircraft Establishment during the 1950s. In 1965 he became the director of the Road Research Laboratory, overseeing the introduction of the breathalyser, motorway crash barriers and compulsory front seat belts.

In 2012 his ashes were scattered at Farnborough Airport from a Tiger Moth.
