= Master of the Buckhounds =

British Royal Household officer

The Master of the Buckhounds (or Master of the Hounds) was an officer in the Master of the Horse's department of the British Royal Household. The holder was also His/Her Majesty's Representative at Ascot. The role was to oversee a hunting pack; a buckhound is smaller than a staghound and used for coursing the smaller breeds of deer, especially fallow deer. The position was abolished by the Civil List Act 1901.

== History ==
Hunting had played a role among England's royalty. The specific role of master of the hounds was first mentioned during the reign of Edward III. At this time it was a hereditary position held by the Brocas family. This tradition faded in the 17th century along with the feudal system, and the monarch instead selected the master of the hounds.

In later years, it was a political office and appointed by the Prime Minister, so the holder changed with every new government. In later years the position was always held by a nobleman who had rendered service to the party in control.

== Hereditary Masters of the Buckhounds ==
The "hereditary" mastership was a serjeanty associated with the Manor of Little Weldon. It was held in the Brocas family until 1633, when it was sold to the Watson family.

- Osborne Lovel (temp. Hen. I)
- William Lovel
- Hamon le Venour
- William Lovel
- John Lovel (died 1316)
- Thomas de Borhunte (died 1340)
- William Danvers (died 1361)
- Sir Bernard Brocas (died 1395)
- Sir Bernard Brocas (died 1400)
- William Brocas (died 1456)
- William Brocas (died 1484)
- John Brocas (died 1492)
- William Brocas (died 1506)
- George Warham and Ralph Pexsall (1512–1514)
- Ralph Pexsall (died 1540)
- Sir Richard Pexsall (died 1571)
- Sir John Savage (until 1584)
- Sir Pexsall Brocas (died 1630)
- Thomas Brocas (until 1633)
- Lewis Watson, 1st Baron Rockingham (died 1653)
- Edward Watson, 2nd Baron Rockingham (died 1689)
- Lewis Watson, 1st Earl of Rockingham (until 1706)

The pack of the Hereditary Master was merged with that of the Privy Master in 1706 and the office ceased.

== Masters of the (Privy) Buckhounds ==
The Privy Buckhounds were created in 1528 by King Henry VIII to provide for a hunting pack overseen by a Royal appointee rather than a hereditary officer.

- 1528: George Boleyn, Viscount Rochford
- 1536: vacant
- 1538: Sir Richard Long
- 1546: vacant
- 1550: Sir Thomas Darcy
- 1551: John Dudley, 2nd Earl of Warwick
- 1552: Lord Robert Dudley
- 1553: vacant
- 1572: Robert Dudley, 1st Earl of Leicester
- 1588: vacant
- 1596: Sir Henry Grey
- 1603: Sir Thomas Tyringham
- 1612: Sir Timothy Tyrrell, Sr.
- 1633: Sir Thomas Tyringham
- 1636: Robert Tyrwith
- 1651: vacant
- 19 September 1660 John Cary
- 31 March 1685 Col. James Grahme
- 9 September 1689 Jacques de Gastigny
- 6 July 1698 Reinhard Vincent Graf von Hompesch
- 8 March 1702 vacant
- 13 June 1709 Walter Chetwynd
- 8 June 1711 Sir William Wyndham, 3rd Baronet
- 28 June 1712 George Brudenell, 3rd Earl of Cardigan
- 11 July 1715 vacant
- 28 July 1727 Francis Negus
- 21 June 1733 Charles Bennet, 2nd Earl of Tankerville
- 18 June 1737 Ralph Jenison
- 31 December 1744 George Montague-Dunk, 2nd Earl of Halifax
- 2 July 1746 Ralph Jenison
- 2 July 1757 John Bateman, 2nd Viscount Bateman
- 29 March 1782: George Villiers, 4th Earl of Jersey
- 17 May 1783: John Montagu, Viscount Hinchingbrooke; succeeded as 5th Earl of Sandwich 30 April 1792
- 12 February 1806: William Keppel, 4th Earl of Albemarle
- 13 May 1806: Charles Cornwallis, 2nd Marquess Cornwallis
- 12 September 1823: William Wellesley-Pole, 1st Baron Maryborough
- 24 November 1830: Thomas Anson, 2nd Viscount Anson; created Earl of Lichfield 15 September 1831
- 30 December 1834: George Stanhope, 6th Earl of Chesterfield
- 30 April 1835: William Hay, 18th Earl of Erroll
- 21 December 1839: George Kinnaird, 9th Lord Kinnaird
- 10 September 1841: James St Clair-Erskine, 3rd Earl of Rosslyn
- 9 July 1846: Granville Leveson-Gower, 2nd Earl Granville
- 16 May 1848: John Ponsonby, 5th Earl of Bessborough
- 28 February 1852: James St Clair-Erskine, 3rd Earl of Rosslyn
- 30 December 1852: John Ponsonby, 5th Earl of Bessborough
- 26 February 1858: John Montagu, 7th Earl of Sandwich
- 18 June 1859: John Ponsonby, 5th Earl of Bessborough
- 23 January 1866: Richard Boyle, 9th Earl of Cork
- 10 July 1866: Charles Colville, 10th Lord Colville of Culross
- 12 December 1868: Richard Boyle, 9th Earl of Cork
- 2 March 1874: Charles Yorke, 5th Earl of Hardwicke
- 3 May 1880: Richard Boyle, 9th Earl of Cork
- 27 June 1885: John Beresford, 5th Marquess of Waterford
- 17 February 1886: Charles Harbord, 5th Baron Suffield
- 16 August 1886: George Coventry, 9th Earl of Coventry
- 25 August 1892: Thomas Lister, 4th Baron Ribblesdale
- 16 July 1895: George Coventry, 9th Earl of Coventry
- 1 November 1900: Charles Cavendish, 3rd Baron Chesham
