= Procurator General =

Procurator General may refer to:

- Procurator General (Russia), an office of Imperial Russia
- Prosecutor General of Armenia, the senior law officer of Armenia
- Procurator General of Macau, the senior law officer of Macau
- Procurator General of the Soviet Union, the highest functionary of the Office of Public Prosecutor of the USSR
- Prosecutor-General of Russia, the head of the system of official prosecution in courts in Russia
- Prosecutor General of Ukraine, the head of the system of official prosecution in courts in Ukraine
- HM Procurator General, one of the positions held by the Treasury Solicitor in the United Kingdom

== See also ==
- Public prosecutor general (disambiguation)
